= State Highway 89 (Karnataka) =

State highway in Karnataka, India

State Highway 89

Route information
- Maintained by Karnataka Road Development Corporation Limited
- Length: 86.97 km (54.04 mi)

Major junctions
- North end: Madikeri
- South end: Kutta

Location
- Country: India
- State: Karnataka
- Primary destinations: Madikeri, Siddapura, Ponnampet, Kutta

Highway system
- Roads in India; Expressways; National; State; Asian; State Highways in Karnataka

State Highway 89, also known as SH-89, is a state highway in the state of Karnataka. This Highway passes entirely in Kodagu district.

Towns and villages along the highway are Madikeri, Kadagadalu, Chettalli, Cherala, Abhyathamangala, Nelli Hudikeri, Siddapura, Pollibetta, Gonikoppal, Ponnampet, Hudikeri, T.Shettigere, Srimangala and Kutta (Kodagu-Wayanad border) . The total length of the highway is 86.97 km.

== Junctions ==
NH 275 Terminal at Sudarshan Circle, Madikeri.
SH 88 Terminal at Sudarshan Circle
SH 8 near Chettalli
SH 91 at Abhyathamangala & Siddapura
SH 90 at Gonikoppal
