= State Highway 91 (Karnataka) =

Road in Karnataka, India

State Highway 91

Route information
- Maintained by Karnataka Road Development Corporation Limited
- Length: 95.50 km (59.34 mi)

Major junctions
- North end: Konanur
- South end: Makutta

Location
- Country: India
- State: Karnataka
- Primary destinations: Konanur, Kushalnagar, Siddapura, Virajpet, Brahmagiri Wildlife Sanctuary

Highway system
- Roads in India; Expressways; National; State; Asian; State Highways in Karnataka

State Highway 91 (SH-91) is a state highway connecting Konanur village of Hassan district and Makutta village of Kodagu, in the South Indian state of Karnataka. It has a total length of 95.50 kilometres (59.34 mi).

== Junctions ==
SH 85 Terminal at Siddapura Gate, Konanur.
SH 88 at Kushalnagar
NH 275 at Kushalnagar
SH 89 at Abhyathamangala & Siddapura
SH 90 at Virajpet
SH 27 at Virajpet
SH 30 Terminal at Makutta

== Background ==
The highway begins at Siddapura-Gate, four kilometres (2.5 mi) from Konanur, bifurcating from SH-85 and traverses in a south-southwesterly direction up to the border village of Makutta in Kodagu from where it merge with the State Highway 30 Thalassery-Coorg-Mysore road of Kerala. This highway forms a part of Madikeri-Hassan highway.

Major towns and villages on the highway are: Konanur, Kadavina Hosalli, Shirangala, Hebbale, Kanive, Kudige, Mullusoge, Kushalnagar, Guddehosur, Nanjarayapatna, Valnoor, Tyagattur, Abhyathamangala, Siddapura, Ammathi, Virajpet, Arji, Betoli and (through Brahmagiri Wildlife Sanctuary) Makutta village (Kodagu-Kannur border).
