= Gonikoppal =

Gonikoppal Gonikoppa
- Town
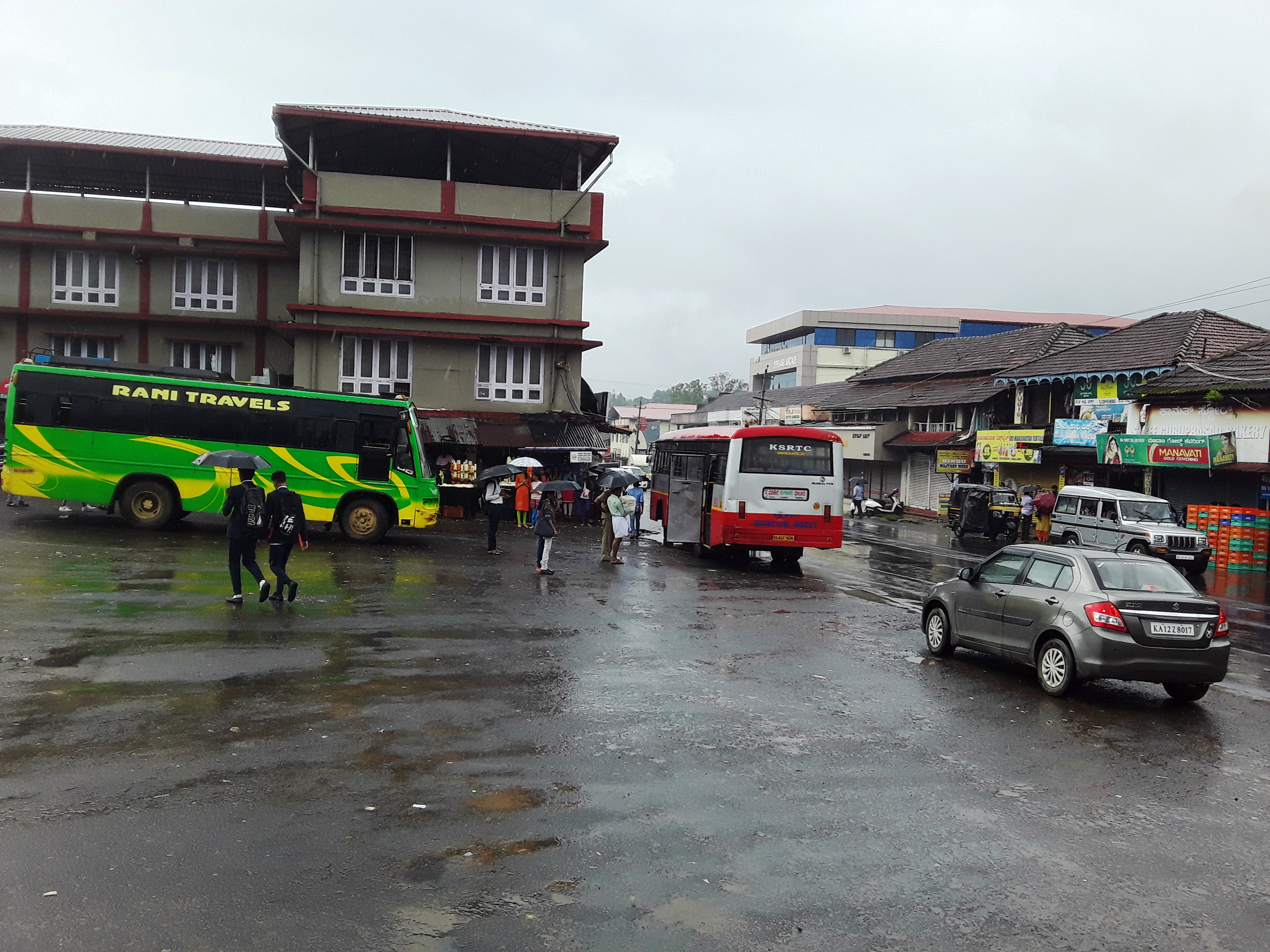
- Gonikoppal Bus Station

- Location in Karnataka, India Gonikoppal (India)
- Coordinates: 12.1833°N 75.9276°E
- Country: India
- State: Karnataka
- District: Kodagu

Government
  - Body: Village Panchayat

Area
  - Total: 3.26 km^{2} (1.26 sq mi)
- Elevation: 850 m (2,790 ft)

Population (2011)
  - Total: 8,306
  - Density: 2,550/km^{2} (6,600/sq mi)

Languages
  - Official: Kannada
- Time zone: UTC+5:30 (IST)
- Postal code: 571213
- Vehicle registration: KA-12

Gonikoppal, also called Gonikoppa is a census town in the Kodagu district of the Indian state of Karnataka.

== Demographics ==
According to 2011 census, Gonikoppal had a population of 8,306. Males constitute 52% of the population and females 48%. Gonikoppal has an average literacy rate of 78%, higher than the national average of 59.5%: male literacy is 83%, and female literacy is 73%. In Gonikoppal, 13% of the population is under 6 years of age.

Gonikoppal is in Ponnampet taluk and is also the commercial hub of Kodagu district due to its proximity to Mysore District and the neighboring Kerala state.

Gonikoppal is the fastest developing town in Kodagu, after kushalnagar.

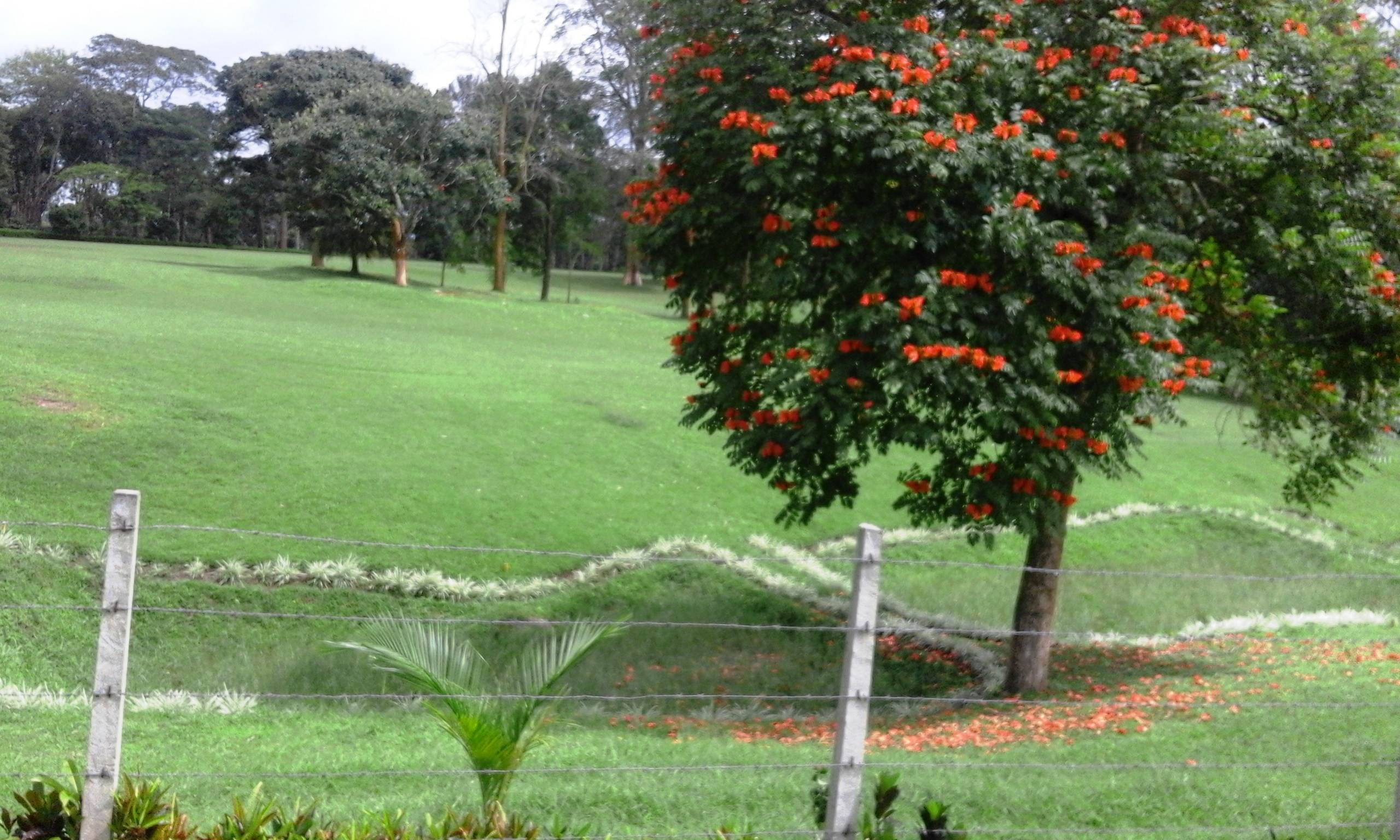
Golf Course of Tata Coffee at Gonikuppe

== Tourist attractions ==
- Pakshi Pathalam is a hillock near Kutta which can be reached by trekking seven kilometers from Thirunelli temple. There is a cave on the hillock with many bird species.
- Kutta is known for its peaceful atmosphere and so a large number of homestays and resorts are located here. Irupu Falls in the jungles is a short drive from Kutta. Also the road from Kutta winds its way to Kabini backwaters and HD Kote.
- Tea Estate near T.Shettigere village, on the way to Shri Mrutyunjaya Swamy temple.
- White water rafting in Barapole river.
- Less known Sharadabi waterfalls, Kunda betta, Brahmagiri Wildlife Sanctuary.
- Shri Mrutyunjaya Swamy temple in Baadagarakeri. It is the only temple in South India dedicated to Lord Mrutyunjaya.

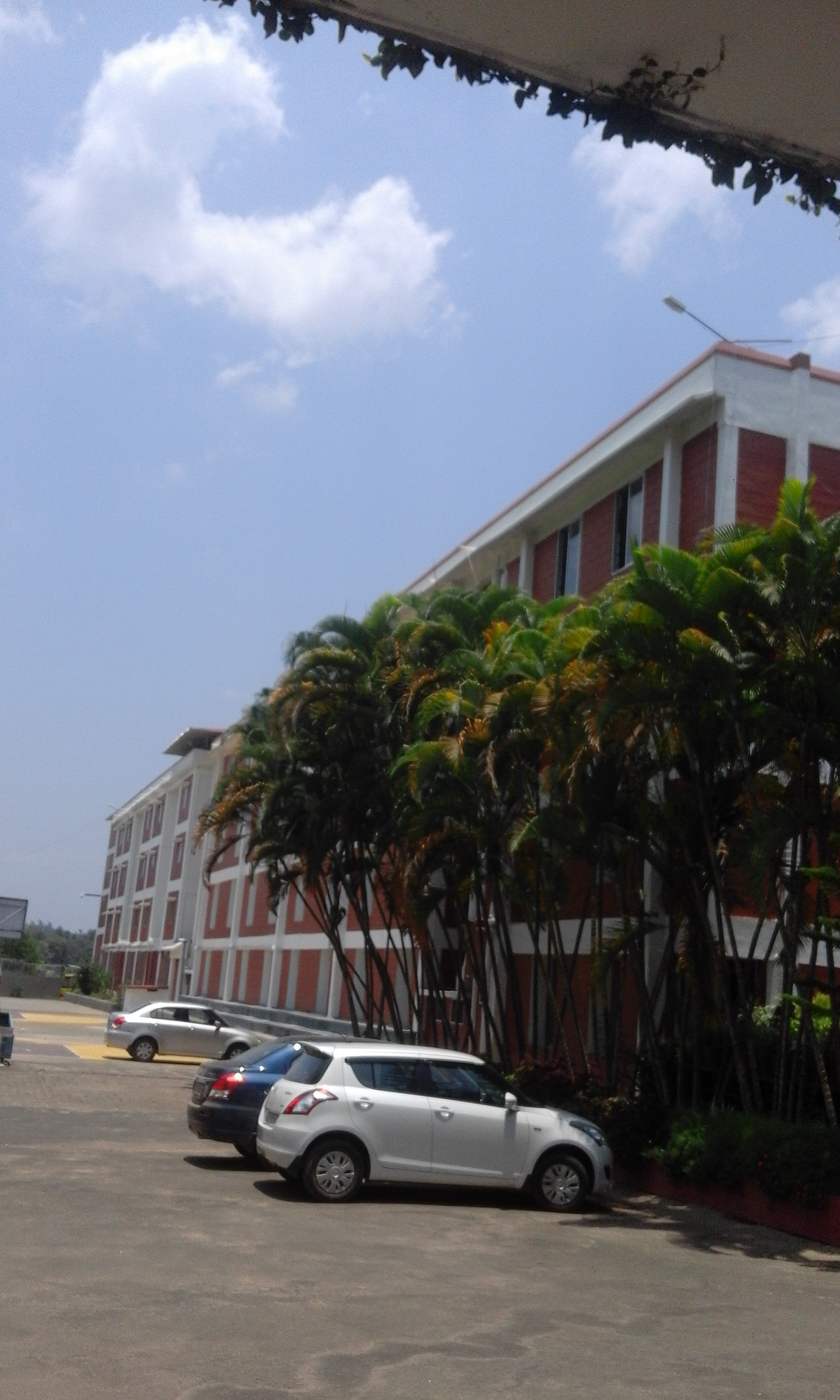
Coorg Public School, Gonikoppal

== Educational organizations ==
- Government Urban Primary School - (106 years old)Originally established by German Basel Missionary Priests.
- Gonikoppal High School Estd 1958
- Cauvery college Est 1968
- Cauvery Polytechnic
- Cauvery PU College
- Lions School Estd 1981
- Lions High School, Kalathmad
- Lions PU College
- St. Thomas School
- Karaumbiah's Academy for Learning & Sports (KALS)
- Coorg Public School
- National Academy School
- Vidyaniketan PU College
- Rajarajeshwari School
- Sarvadaivatha Primary & High School

== Transportation ==
State Highway 89 and SH-90 pass through this town. The town is well connected to Mysuru, Bengaluru and its district headquarters Madikeri. Private buses connects the town with all the other towns in Kodagu district. KSRTC buses connect Gonikoppal to metropolitan cities like Bengaluru, Kochi, Mysuru, and other cities like Mangaluru, Kannur, Kozhikode, Kalpetta, Hassan and Chikkamagaluru. There is no railway station in Gonikoppal. The nearest railway station is Mysuru Junction railway station at 90 km. The nearest airport is Kannur International Airport at 70 km.

== Suburbs and villages ==
- Kutta, Poojekkal, Manchalli and Hudkeri, T Shettigeri, Srimangala, Birunani
- Begur, Ponnampet and Aruvathoklu
- Chikpet, Kabbinakkad and Kabbinakkad
- Kallur, Choorikkad and Machaan
- Kallali, Devarajacolony and Panchavalli
- Kokkarehosalli, Muddenahalli and Thithimathi
- Kothur, Besgur, Bekesodlur, Kanoor, Nadikeri.

== See also ==
- Madikeri
- Virajpet
- Ponnampet
- Kutta
- Suntikoppa
- Napoklu
- Kushalanagar
- Somwarpet
- Kaikeri
- Pollibetta
