= Adiganahalli =

Adiganahalli may refer to:

- Adiganahalli, Bangalore Urban district, a village in Karnataka, India
- Adiganahalli, Mysore district, a village in Karnataka, India
