= Hanagodu =

- Village
- Location within Karnataka Location within India
- Coordinates: 12.238418°N 76.188332°E
- Country: India
- State: Karnataka
- District: Mysuru
- Taluk: Hunasuru

Area
  - Total: 6.75 km^{2} (2.61 sq mi)
- Elevation: 834 m (2,736 ft)

Population (2011)
  - Total: 3,023
  - Density: 448/km^{2} (1,160/sq mi)
- Time zone: UTC+05:30 (India Standard Time)
- PIN: 571106

Hanagodu is a village/hobli in Hunsur taluk of Mysuru district in Karnataka state, India.

== Location ==
Hanagodu village is located about 15 km southwest of Hunsur city and 7 km south of State Highway 90. The population of the village is 3,023. The male population is 1,524 while female population is 1,499. Literacy rate of hanagodu village is 60.21% out of which 67.45% males and 52.84% females are literate. There are about 721 houses in hanagodu village.

== Administration ==
Hanagodu village is administrated by a sarpanch who is an elected representative. As per the 2019 stats, Hanagodu village comes under Hunsur assembly constituency and Mysuru parliamentary constituency. Piriyapatna is the nearest town to Hanagodu village for all major economic activities, which is approximately 17 km away.

== Facilities ==
The village has a branch of Canara Bank, a post office, a lodge and a few tea shops.
