= Kattemad agitation =

On 27 December 2024, Kodava devotees belonging to Kattemad village in Madikeri taluk in Kodagu district, Karnataka were stopped from going to the Sree Maha Mrithyunjaya Temple in their village and refused entry to the annual temple festival for wearing their traditional attire - sari for women and kupya chele (kuppiya chele) for men -by temple management as fer baylaw. There has been extensive news coverage about the incident and its aftermath ever since.

== Background ==
The Kattemad Mruthunjaya temple is a renovated one; it was built around a keri Mahadeva linga in the wilderness using funds collected from Kodavas across Kodagu. The first annual temple festival was observed in December 2024. The village Kattemad is called Kattemadu in Kannada. The Nandetira Kodava clan were the hereditary village and temple chieftains. A discriminatory bylaw had been made to bar those wearing the Kodava dress without regard to ancestral practice, by an Arebhashe committee that occupied the temple in the recent past. Members of the Arebhashe community, claiming to be the temple committee, had enforced a dhoti-only dress code, leading to tension between both communities.

== Incident ==
Scores of Kodava community members, including women in traditional attire, were prevented from entering the Mrithyunjaya temple of their village by individuals from the Arebhashe community claiming to represent the temple management. The Kodavas were told by the accused individuals of the Arebhashe community to either remove their traditional dress or leave the premises.The video footage went viral on social media and later drew criticism for the disrespect to the Kodava community. It was claimed that the temple's by-law prohibited the traditional attire, but the Kodava community members vehemently denied it. According to eye-witnesses, a few Kodava devotees outside the shrine chanted, "Maadhe (Mahadeva) Pore Powodhi (Parvathi) E Pore," (Praise Mahadeva Shiva, Praise Parvathi) invoking God's name at the shrine, which is an old Mahadeva Shiva temple renovated recently. The trouble actually began when some miscreants, pretending to be Vaishnava, came with saffron flags, chanted 'Govinda, Govinda' and created a ruckus while verbally attacking the Kodava devotees.

== Aftermath ==
The incident sparked an outrage among the Kodava community members who planned a 'Kodavara nade Kattemadu kade' ('Kodavas walk towards Kattemad', protest march) to protest the restrictions to their cultural practices. Virajpet Kodava Samaja's honorary secretary Maletira Srinivas accused politically motivated individuals of attempting to strip the Kodavas of their rights and insulting Kodava women. He had announced a peaceful 'Kattemad Chalo' protest during a press conference on the 28th of December, 2024.

The local MLAs A. S. Ponnanna and Mantar Gowda and the local MP Yaduveer Krishnadatta Chamaraja Wadiyar appealed to the people for peace. Police were deployed as Kodavas gathered to protest.

The Arebhashe Samaja Federation held a meeting to defend the decision to bar those in Kodava attire from the temple. The Arebhashe leaders among them, Surtale Somanna, Periyana Dayananda, and Ambekal Naveen Kushalappa, pretended to represent everybody at the temple but actually spoke only for their Samaja from Madikeri town.

Kodavas protested this discrimination on social media. The district administration imposed Section 163 of BNSS within a 5-km radius of the village temple till 2 January 2025. Many Kodava organisations planned to participate in a procession to Kattemad.

One report says that there were 100 personnel deployed, including Karnataka State Reserve Police (KSRP) and District Armed Forces within the temple premises, along with police patrols. Another report stated that around 300 police personnel were deployed around the temple and two KSRP platoons were stationed on the road leading to the temple on the 30th of December, 2024.

== Arrests and protests ==
A peaceful vehicle rally was planned from Ponnampet to Kattemad in the morning without roadblocks, but the police prevented it by arresting and engaging the organisers. Early in the morning of 30 December 2024, members of the Kodava Riders Club and Kodava residents were arrested in Ponnampet as a preventive measure. Ponnampet is around 30 kilometres from Kattemad. Among the arrested were three leaders and at least 20 residents who attempted a rally to Kattemad.The detained Kodava leaders of the peace rally were Ajjikuttira Prithvi Subbaiah, Chammattira Praveen Uthappa and Sannuvanda Darshan Kaverappa.

At least one report claims that hundreds of supporters along with the rally organisers were pre-emptively detained from their houses and villages in Ponnampet taluk and transported in police buses to Kushalnagar and other areas, deported far away from their native villages to prevent the rally. According to the police, about 50 people had been detained by the Ponnampet police.

In response to the whimsical detentions, a total bandh was organised in Hudikeri town in the morning and the police were demanded to release all those arrested. Protests were held by residents in Ponnampet, Hudikeri, Gonikoppa, and Napoklu opposing the arrests that day. Residents in Ponnampet, Hudikeri, Murnad, and Gonikoppa observed partial shutdowns to protest the restrictions on Kodavas. Protesters gathered at the Ponnampet Police Station and were seen arguing with the police to release those detained. As protests erupted across Kodagu district, the Kodava protesters blocked the roads in several locations including Virajpet, Hudikeri, B Shettigeri, Ponnampet, and Napoklu.

The district administration arranged a peace meeting between Kodava and Arebhashe leaders on that evening. The arrested Kodavas were later released that day. The district administration has given 6 January 2025 as the deadline for sorting out the issue.

Individuals from both communities have been arrested for posting derogatory comments on social media. The Akhila Kodava Samaja and the Federation of Kodava Samajas met the temple committee and the Arebhashe leaders but no resolution was arrived at. Meanwhile, the ban orders around the temple was extended until 7 January 2025.
