= Chilkunda =

Village in Mysore district, Karnataka, India

Coordinates: 12.339474°N 76.187482°E

Chilkunda is a village in Mysore district of Karnataka state, India.

== Location ==
Chilkunda is located between Hunsur and Kushalanagar towns on Mysore to Madikeri highway.

== Demographics ==
Chilkunda village has 2,500 inhabitants.

== Economy ==
The economy of the village is mostly agrarian. The major crop is ragi. Tobacco, arecanut, coconut and beetle leaf grow here.

== Educational organisations ==
- Icon International School, Chilkunda
- Government Primary School, Chilkunda

== Villages and suburbs ==
- Hosakoppalu, 1 km
- Habbanakuppe, 3 km
- Makodee, 7 km
- Makode, 7 km
- Thattekere, 8 km
- Abbur, 10 km
- Hitnehebbagilu, 12 km

== Festivals ==
The main festival is ramanavami, Ramzan celebrated for 30 days during the holy month. Ramotsava is celebrated for about 10 days in March and April on behalf of the birthday of Sri Rama. Other festivals celebrated are Ganesh Chaturthi, Deepavali, Sankranti, Ugadi, Shivaratri, and Navaratri.

== Temples ==
- Jamia Masjid Chilkunda
- Masjid e Farukia
- Srivanii village temple
- Srivani amma village temple
- Ishwara temple
- Hanuman temple
- Basaveshwara temple
- Sri Rama mandira

== Post office ==
There is a post office in the village and the postal code is 571105.
