= Codava National Council =

- Leader: N. U. Nachappa
- Preceded by: Kodagu Rajya Mukthi Morcha
- Headquarters: Capital Village, Madikeri, Kodagu

Map of South Indian states prior to the States Reorganisation Act,1956. Kodagu (then called Coorg), home of the Kodavas, is in dark green.

Codava National Council, is a social, political and cultural organisation in the Indian state of Karnataka. Formerly CNC (Codava National Council) was known as KRMM (Kodagu Rajya Mukti Morcha). The KRMM demanded a separate statehood status for Kodagu until the 1990s. Later they scaled down their demand. Ever since they have been demanding a Kodava hill council in Kodagu. The CNC Organisation's president is Nandineravanda U. Nachappa Codava. CNC is the largest political group in the Kodagu district. CNC urges for geo-political autonomy for indigenous Kodavas and their lands and recognition of their cultural heritage and rights.

== Demands ==
The CNC struggle is asking for:

1. Codava land autonomous region under the 6th schedule of the Constitution and constitutional special guarantee for Kodava

2. Jamma land and Jamma malai land (traditional sedentary farming and hill farming lands of Kodavas) under Article 370 and 371 of the Constitution, as has been done in relation to the lands of State of Jammu and Kashmir and North Eastern states of India (and to some extent in other states also),

3. Ethno linguistic tribal minority nationality status to Codavas under Article 340 and 342 of the Constitution, inclusion of Kodava Thakk in the 8th schedule of the Constitution,

4. Constitution special guarantee for Kodava customary personal laws and heritage, on the lines of Mizos and Nagas.

5. Also exemption to carry weapons (due to martial traditions similar to Sikhs and Nagas) should be guaranteed under the Constitution of India without any hindrance for ever.

The Kodavas compulsorily worship arms (guns and swords) as it is part of their religious traditions. From 1600 they have held guns and swords as they were the militia of Kodagu and every Kodava compulsorily served in the Raja's and the Nayaka's (chieftain's) army. However the Kodavas have traditional rules which strictly forbid even the pointing of a gun or a sword at another person especially a civilian, except for one's defence. Usually the gun's bore is never pointed in the direction of a person. 6. Also universal recognition for Kodava race and internal political self-determination rights for Kodavas. Until 2000 the name of CNC was Kodagu Rajya Mukti Morcha (KRMM or Kodagu State Liberation Front). The CNC is asking for a Kodava hill council in Kodagu and for the protection of the rights of the Kodavas, an ethnic and linguistic minority in South India. CNC has been demanding an Autonomous Hill Council on the lines of Ladakh and Darjeeling.

=== Caste Reservations ===
Around the early 2000s, the Kodava people were included in the Other Backward Classes list of Karnataka. The Kodavas were listed as Kodagaru (a derogatory term) under the Category III A of the Other Backwards Caste (OBC) List of Karnataka State Government. The CNC had appealed to the State Government to correct this and mention them as Kodavas and to include them in the Central Government Other Backward Castes (OBC) List.

== See also ==
- Autonomous regions of India
- Kattemad agitation
