= Nilavagilu =

Village in Karnataka, India

Nilavagilu is a small village in Hunsur, Karnataka, India.
