= Arabithittu Wildlife Sanctuary =

Wildlife sanctuary in Karnataka, India

Coordinates: 12°19′25″N 76°24′20″E

- IUCN category IV (habitat/species management area)
- Interactive map of Arabithittu Wildlife Sanctuary
- Location: Mysore district, Karnataka, India
- Established: 1985

Arabithittu Wildlife Sanctuary is located in the Mysore district of Karnataka, India. It was declared as a wildlife sanctuary on 30 April 1985. It was originally called the Arabithittu Game Reserve. The sanctuary has a large area of eucalyptus and sandalwood plantations. It also has scrub forests and other plantations in the area.

== Location ==
Arabithittu Wildlife Sanctuary covers an area of 13.5 square kilometres (5.2 sq mi). It is located in the Mysore district at Hunsur Taluk, Karnataka, and because of this, it is also known as Hunsur Territorial Range. Arabithittu Wildlife Sanctuary has a chain link installed by the Defense Research Development Organization of the Ministry of Defense to act as a boundary for the sanctuary.

== Flora and fauna ==
Arabithittu Wildlife Sanctuary is home to various species of flora and fauna. It has large plantations of eucalyptus and sandalwood, surrounded by agricultural fields. Other species of animals like wild boar, leopard, fox, spotted deer, mongoose, etc., are also found there.
