= Panchavalli =

- Village
- Interactive map of Panchavalli
- Coordinates: 12.27023°N 76.13457°E
- Country: India
- State: Karnataka
- District: Mysore
- Taluk: Piriyapatna

Government
  - Body: Grama Panchayath

Area
  - Total: 4 km^{2} (1.5 sq mi)
- Elevation: 882 m (2,894 ft)

Population (2011)
  - Total: 2,009
- Time zone: UTC+5:30 (IST)
- PIN: 571105

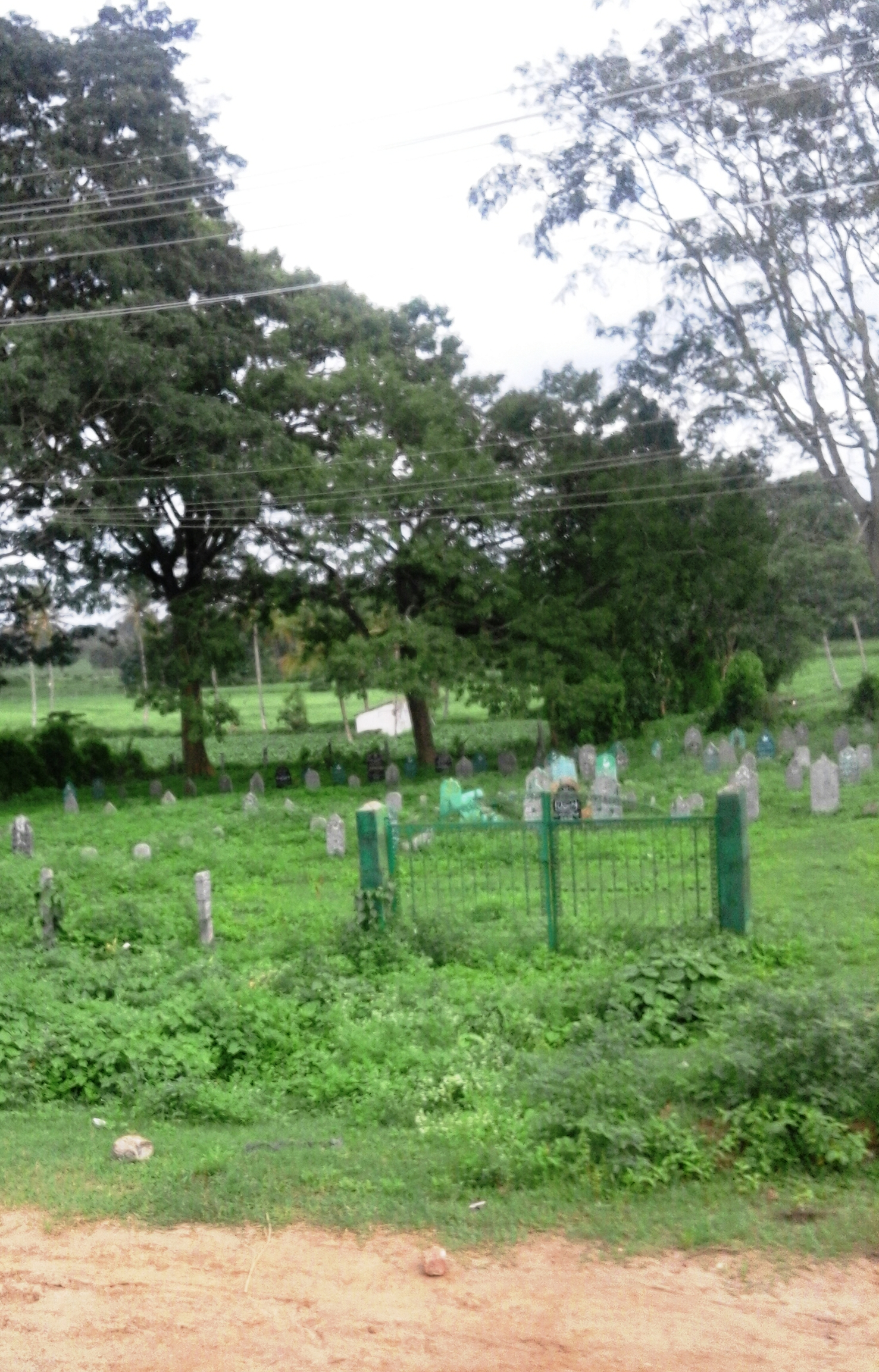
Panchavalli village

Panchavalli is a village in Piriyapatna taluk in the Mysore district of Karnataka state, India.

== Location ==
Panchavalli is located on Mysuru-Virajpet Road, 17 km west of Hunsur town. It is 9 km from its taluk headquarter, Piriyapatna and 62 km from its district headquarter, Mysuru.

== Post Office ==
There is a post office at Panchavalli. The postal code is 571105.

== Demographics ==
Panchavalli village has a population of 2,009 people. There are a total of 445 houses. The literacy rate is 65%. Female literacy is only 57%.

== Administration ==
The village has a council called Panchayath headed by a Sarpanch.

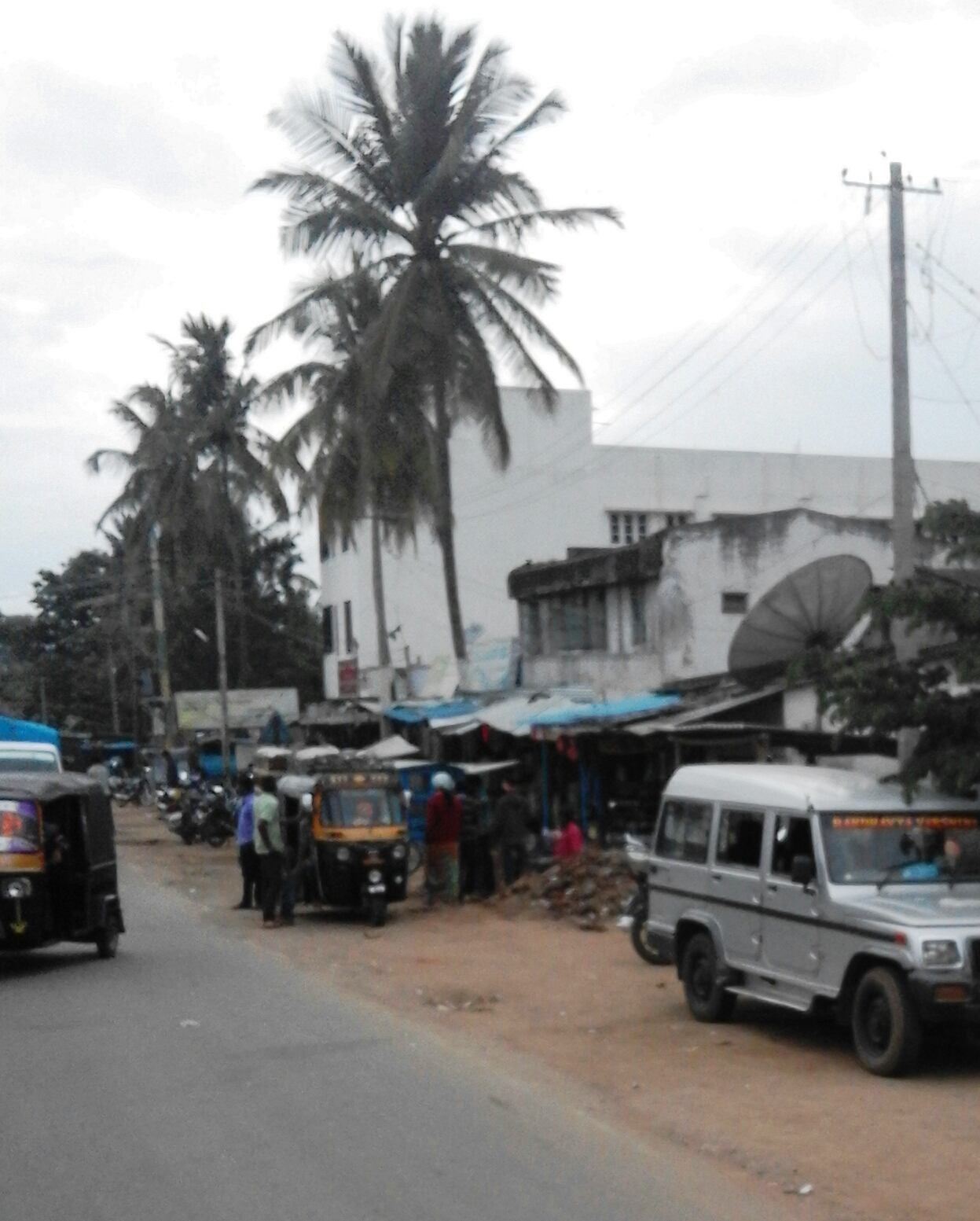
Panchavalli village
