= Thithimathi =

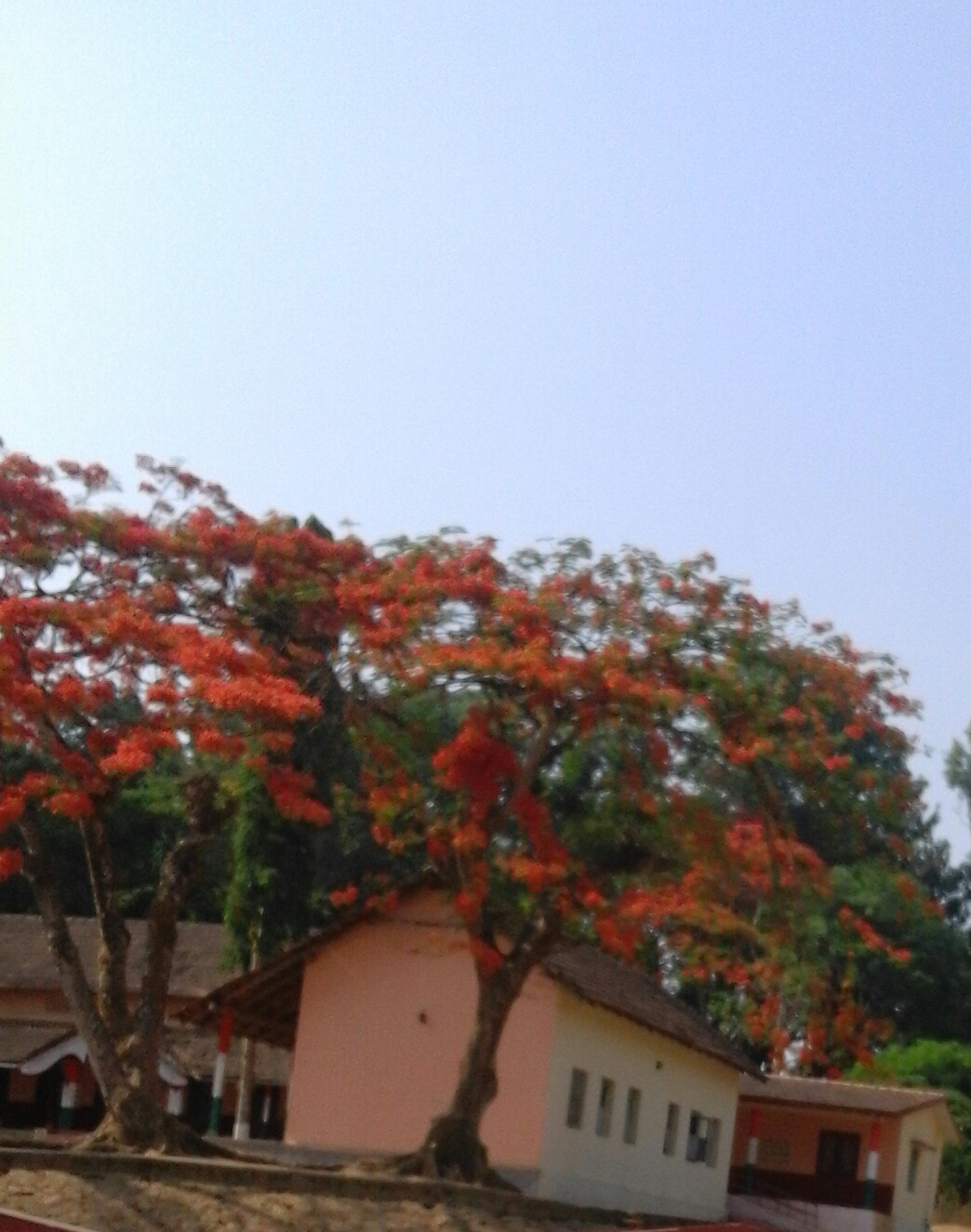
- Interactive map of Thithimathi
- Coordinates: 12.21185°N 76.00136°E
- Country: India
- State: Karnataka
- District: Kodagu

Population
  - Total: 4,800
- Time zone: UTC+5:30 (IST)
- PIN: 571254

Thithimathi is a small town in Kodagu district of Karnataka state, India. As of 2020, the population was 8800, with 4400 men and 4400 women.

== Location ==
Thithimathi is located some 78 km from Mysore, 58 km from Madikeri, 191 km from Mangalore, and 214 km from Bangalore.

== Post Office ==
Thithimathi has a post office and the postal code is 571254.

== Nearby villages ==
- Mayamudi - 9 km
- Mekur Hosakeri - 9 km
- Maldare - 13 km
- Gonikoppal - 10 km

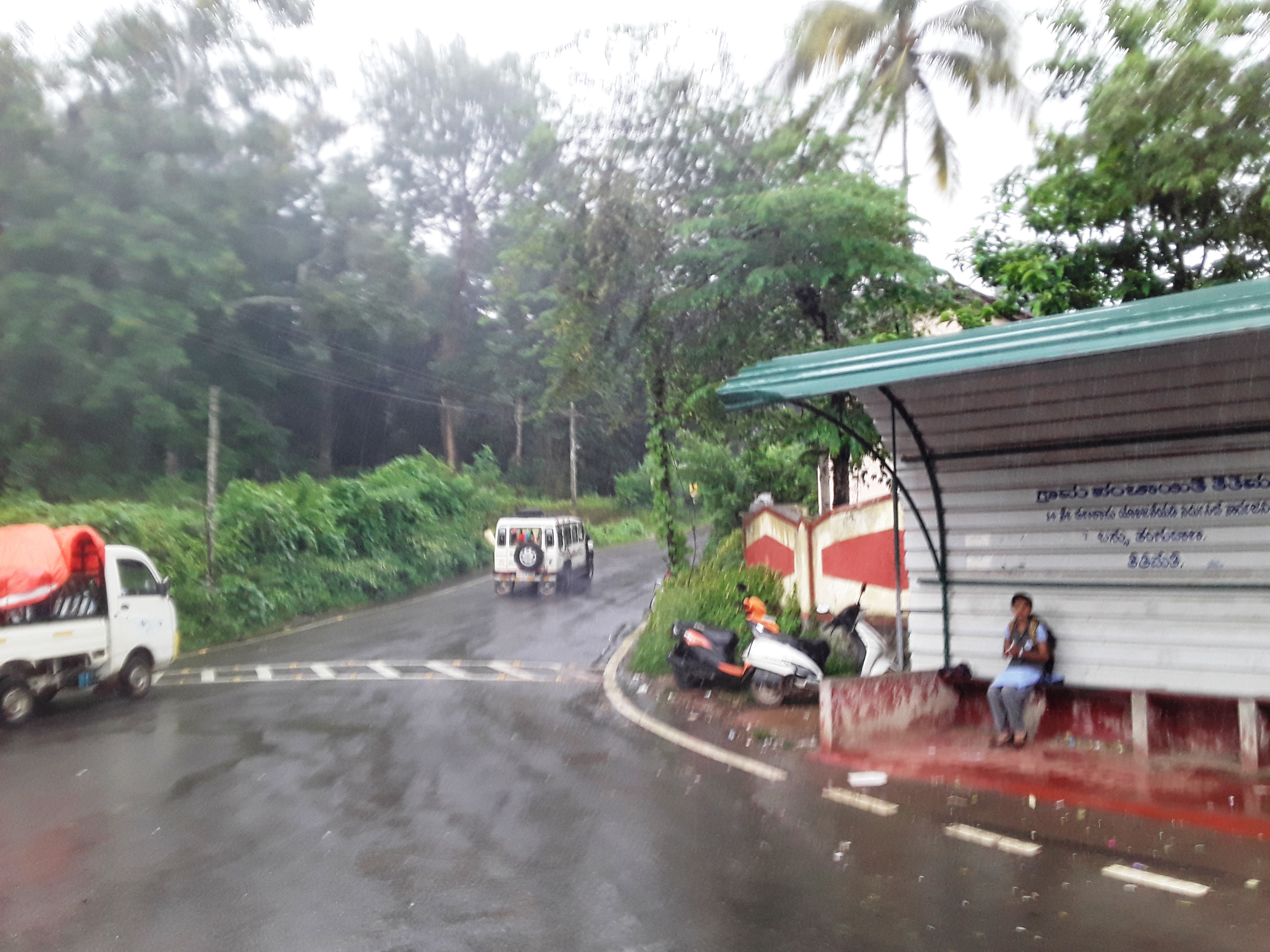
Thithimathi town

== Transportation ==
There is no airport or railway station in Thithimathi. Nearest travel point is Mysore at a distance of 78 km. There are buses to Thithimathi from Gonikoppal, Mysore and Madikeri.

== Educational organisations ==
- Thithimathi Government PU College.
- Thithimathi government high school.
- Thithimathi government primary school.
- Marooru government primary school.
- Devamacchi Government Primary school.
