= State Highway 30 (Kerala) =

Highway in Kerala, India

State Highway 30
- Thalassery Coorg Road
- SH 30 highlighted in red

Route information
- Maintained by Kerala Public Works Department
- Length: 55.1 km (34.2 mi)

Major junctions
- South-West end: NH 66 in Thalassery
- NH 66 Thalassery-Mahe Bypass in Chonadam; SH 38 in Kuthuparamba; SH 36 in Iritty; SH 59 in Vallithode
- North-East end: SH 91 at KA border in Koottupuzha

Location
- Country: India
- State: Kerala
- Districts: Kannur
- Major cities: Thalassery, Kadirur, Kuthuparamba, Mattanur, Iritty

Highway system
- Roads in India; Expressways; National; State; Asian; State Highways in Kerala
← SH 29	→ SH 31

State Highway 30 (SH 30) is a Major Inter-State Highway in Kerala, India that starts in Thalassery and ends at the state boundary. The highway named as Thalassery-Coorg-Mysore Road is 55.1 km (34.2 mi) long. The Thalassery-Coorg-Mysore Road (State Highway 30) starts at Thalassery in Kerala, passing through towns like Kuthuparamba, Mattanur and Iritty, before crossing into Karnataka. It continues through the towns of Madikeri and Virajpet in Coorg, eventually connecting to Madikeri-Mysuru Expressway at National Highway 275. The route links key road networks in both states, joining with National Highway 66 in Thalassery and merging with other important roads as it heads towards Mysuru. It intersect with National Highway 66 Thalassery-Mahe Bypass at Eranholi. It also links the Kannur Airport road at Mattanur.

== Route description ==
This road starts in Thalassery, located in the Kannur district, where it connects with the old route of National Highway 66. It then passes through Chonadam, where it intersects with the newly constructed Thalassery-Mahe bypass of National Highway 66. The road continues through Kadirur town and reaches Kuthuparamba, where it connects with State Highway 38. As it heads towards Mattanur, it intersects with the Kannur-Mattanur road, which links to Kannur airport. The road then passes through Iritty and intersects with State Highway 36. Finally, when it reaches Vallithode, it connects with State Highway 59 before ending at the Kerala-Karnataka border at Kootupuzha, where Karnataka State Highway 91 begins.

This is the only state highway linking for the Kannur International Airport from the National Highway 66. This road experiences heavy congestion due to interstate cargo movement between Kerala and Karnataka, functioning as a key economic corridor. On one end, it connects to National Highway 66 at Thalassery, while at the other end, it links to National Highway 275 via Karnataka State Highway 91 at Kushalnagar. NH 275 further extends to the Bangalore-Mysore Expressway, enhancing its significance as a vital transportation route. This road connects Kannur district with Coorg, Mysore, and Bangalore.

== Main intersections ==
- Intersecting with National Highway 66 Thalassery-Mahe Bypass at Chonadam
- Intersecting with State Highway 38 at Kuthuparamba
- Intersecting with Kannur-Mattanur road linking Kannur airport at Mattanur
- Intersecting with State Highway 36 at Iritty
- Intersecting with State Highway 59 at Vallithode
- Connecting with State Highway 91 at Kootupuzha

== Route map ==
Thalassery - NH 66 - Eranholi - Thalassery Mahe Bypass - Kadirur - Kuthuparamba - Nirmalagiri - Mattannur - Iritty - Madathil - Koottupuzha - passing the State Boundary reaches SH 91 in Karnataka.

== See also ==
- Roads in Kerala
- List of state highways in Kerala
