= Thalassery-Mahe Bypass =

Segment of highway in Kerala, India

Route information
- Maintained by NHAI
- Length: 18.6 km (11.6 mi)
- Existed: 2024–present

Major junctions
- From: NH 66 in Muzhappilangad
- SH 30 in Chonadam
- To: NH 66 in Azhiyur

Location
- Country: India
- State: Kerala
- Districts: Kannur, Mahe, Kozhikode
- Major cities: Thalassery, Mahe

Highway system
- Roads in India; Expressways; National; State; Asian; State Highways in Kerala

Thalassery-Mahe Bypass is a part of NH 66 that bypasses Thalassery city in Kerala and Mahé Puducherry, India. The busy 18.6 km long bypass starts at Mahé, Puducherry, via Muzhappilangad in Thalassery, Kerala.

== Description ==
The Thalassery-Mahe National Highway bypass connects Muzhappilangad in the Kannur district to Azhiyur in Kozhikode, India. 6 lane signal free national highway project along the coast of the Indian state Kerala. The bypass includes four river bridges in Anjarakandi, Kuyyali, Dharmadam, and Mahe, 21 underpasses, a railway flyover, and a toll plaza in Kolassery. It intersect with State Highway 30 Thalassery-Coorg-Mysuru road at Chonadam. The Maximum permissible speed for this road is 100 km/h on 6-lane national highways in kerala.

== Cost of the bypass project ==
The bypass project was first pitched in 1977. Union Transport Minister Nitin Gadkari inaugurated the construction of the road project in 2018. The total cost of the project was 1543 crore, and the 45-meter-wide six-lane road was constructed on 85.5 acres of land.

== Main Intersections ==
- Intersecting with State Highway 30 Thalassery-Coorg-Mysore Road at Chonadam

== See also ==
- Thalassery
- Mahé
- Valanchery Bypass
- Kottakkal Bypass
- NH-66
