= Maldare =

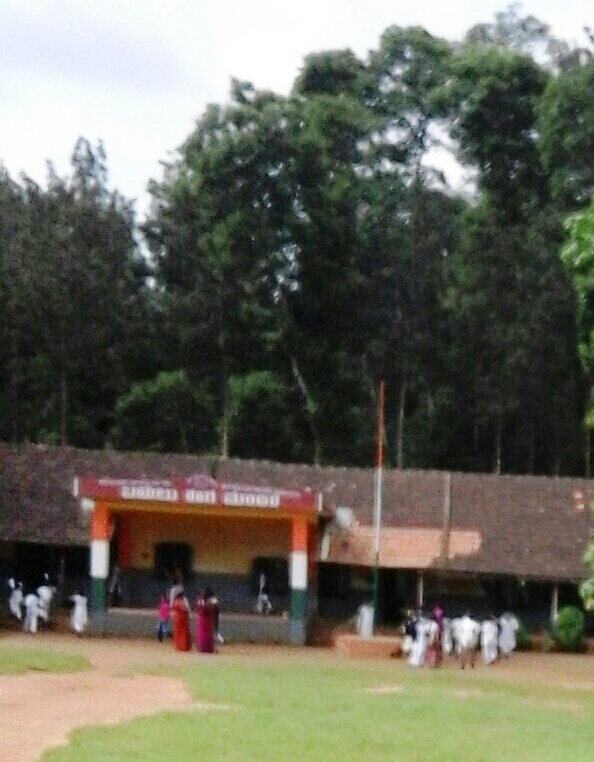
- Nickname: Maldare school
- Interactive map of Maldare
- Coordinates: 12.32189°N 75.94917°E
- Country: India
- State: Karnataka
- District: Kodagu
- Time zone: UTC+5:25 (IST)
- PIN: 571253

Maldare is a small village in Kodagu district of Karnataka state, India.

== Location ==
Maldare is located on the forest road between Piriyapatna and Siddapura.

== Distance ==
Madikeri, 31 km Virajpet, 26 km Mangalore, 175 km Bangalore, 223 km

== Post Office ==
There is a post office at Maldare village. The pincode is 571523.

== Suburbs and villages ==
- Mekur Hosakeri - 12 km
- Nanjarayapatna - 12 km
- Valnur Thyagathur - 12 km
- Thithimathi - 13 km
- Ammathi - 17 km

== Demographics ==
The village of Maldare has a population of 2,027 and there are a total of 525 houses. The people here speak Kannada, Kodava thakk and Malayalam.

== Schools ==
Ekalavya Vasathi School Balugodu St Annes School Minority School

- Maldare School
