= Nalvathoklu =

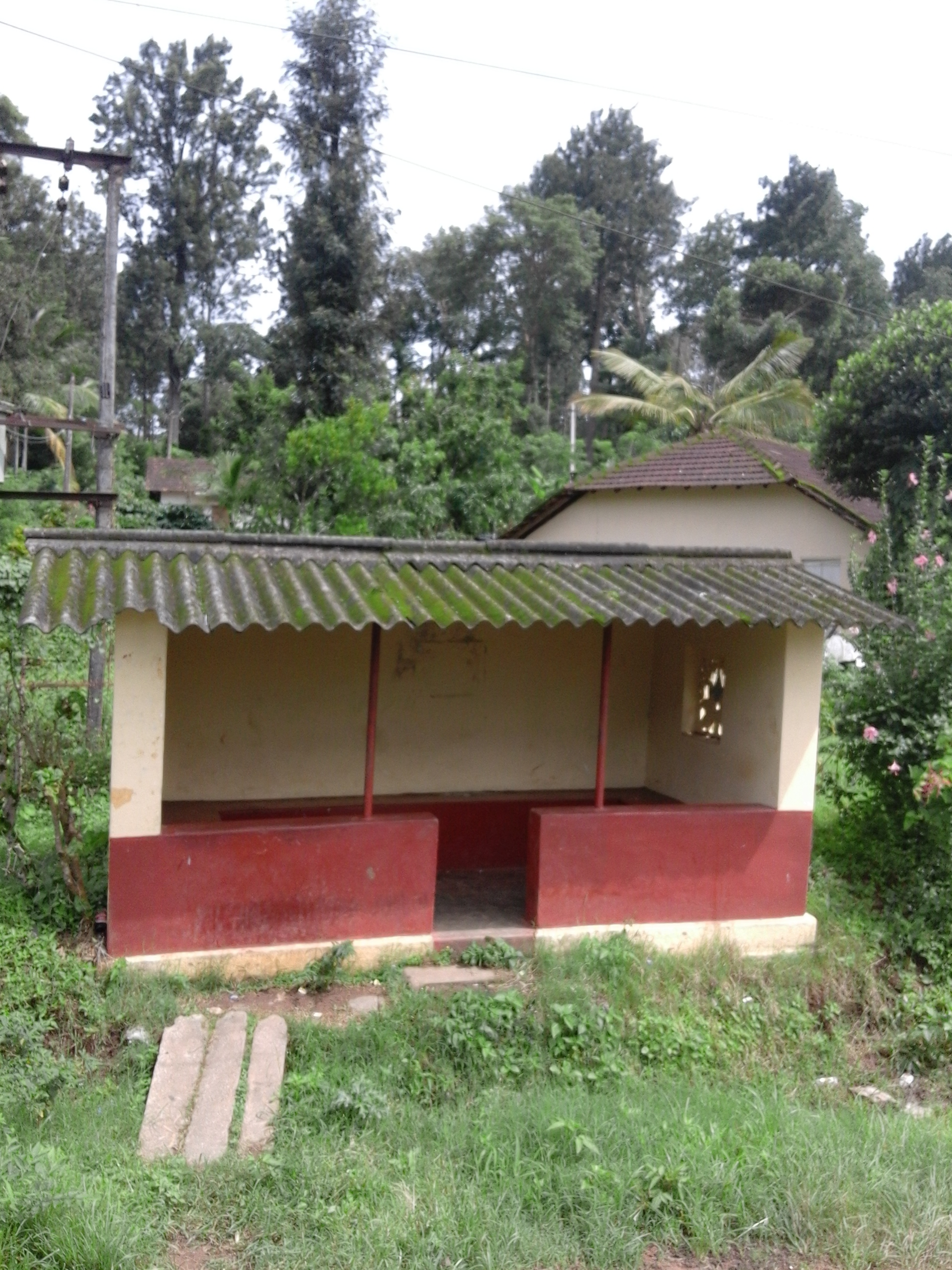
- Interactive map of Nalvathoklu
- Coordinates: 12.19642°N 75.83485°E
- Country: India
- State: Karnataka
- District: Kodagu
- Time zone: UTC+5:25 (IST)
- PIN: 571218

Nalvathoklu is a small village in Kodagu district of Karnataka state in India.

== Location ==
Nalvathoklu is located between Virajpet and Siddapura towns on a pocket road, and it is near Gonikoppal with road connectivity. It is about 31 km towards south of Madikeri, the district headquarters, 170 km away from the port city of Mangalore and 248 km away from Bangalore, the state capital.

== Administration ==
Nalvathoklu is part of Virajpet taluk in Kodagu district. Nalvathoklu is generally known as Chokandalli by the locals.

== Post office ==
There are post offices at Nalvathoklu and Engingere villages. The pincode is 571218.

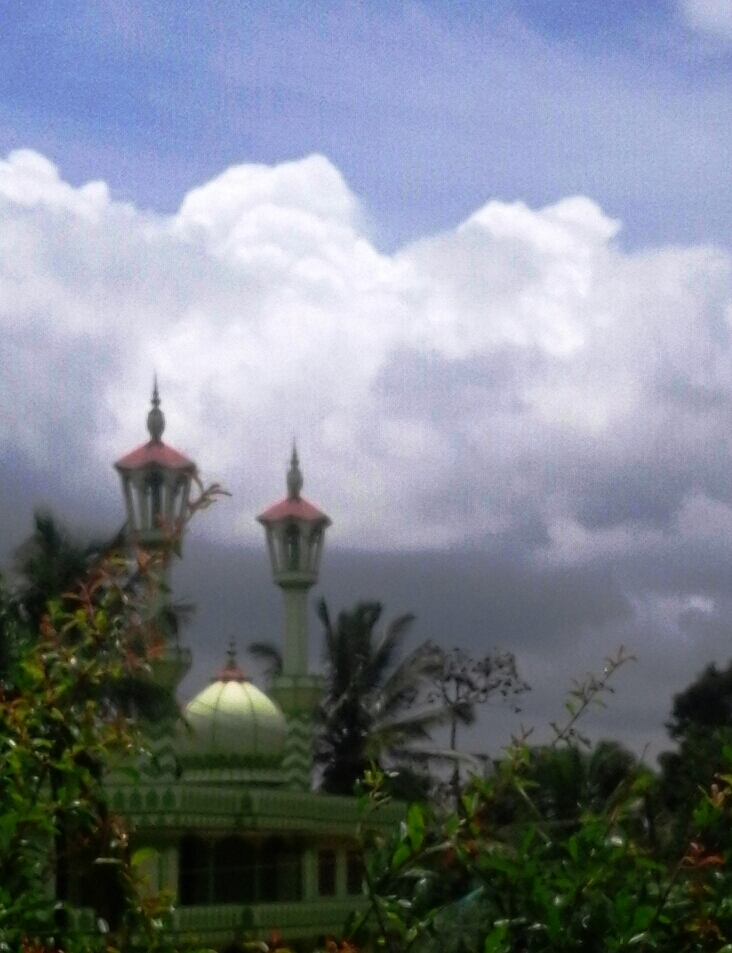
Chokandalli Mosque

== Mosques ==
- Mohidheen Juma Masjid, Nalvathoklu(Chokandalli)

== Education ==
The schools in the area include St. Anne P.U. College, Cauvery College, Coorg Institute of Technology, Coorg Institute of Dental Sciences, and Government School, Nalvathoklu.

== Demographics ==
Kodava Takk and Malayalam are the languages spoken by the people in this village. Most of the people are Kodava Mappila's (Muslims) and Kodavas (Hindus).

== Suburbs and villages ==
The settlements include, Kavadi, Engingere Post Office.
