= Halligattu =

- Village
- Location in Karnataka, India Halligattu (India)
- Coordinates: 12.1367100°N 75.920740°E
- Country: India
- State: Karnataka
- District: Kodagu
- Taluk: Ponnampet

Government
  - Body: Village Panchayath

Area
  - Total: 10.8623 km^{2} (4.1940 sq mi)

Population (2011)
  - Total: 6,473
  - Density: 595.9/km^{2} (1,543/sq mi)

Languages
  - Official: Kannada
- Time zone: UTC+5:30 (IST)

Halligattu is a village in the southern state of Karnataka, India. It is located in the Ponnampet taluk of Kodagu district.

As per census survey of 2011, its Location code number is 618054. This village contains in itself, the town of Ponnampet as well.

== Demographics ==
As of 2001 India census, Halligattu had a population of 5658 with 2956 males and 2702 females.

== See also ==
- Kodagu
- Districts of Karnataka
