= State Highway 8 (Karnataka) =

Road in Karnataka, India

State Highway 8

Route information
- Maintained by Karnataka Road Development Corporation Limited
- Length: 184 km (114 mi)

Major junctions
- East end: Hirisave
- West end: Chettalli

Location
- Country: India
- State: Karnataka
- Primary destinations: Shravanabelagola Channarayapatna, Holenarasipura, Suntikoppa

Highway system
- Roads in India; Expressways; National; State; Asian; State Highways in Karnataka

State Highway 8, also known as SH-8, is a State highway connecting Hirisave of Hassan district and Chettalli of Kodagu district, in the South Indian state of Karnataka. It has a total length of 184 kilometres (114 mi).

Major towns and villages on the highway are Hirisave, Shravanabelagola, Channarayapatna, Mudala Hippe, Holenarasipura, Arkalgud, Shanivarsante, Changadihalli, Kudrasthe, Vanagoor, Kundalli, Shanthalli, Thalthareshettahalli, Thakeri, Billigeri, Kumbur, Garagandoor, Suntikoppa and Chettalli.
