= State Highway 90 (Karnataka) =

Road in Karnataka, India

State Highway 90

Route information
- Maintained by Karnataka Road Development Corporation Limited
- Length: 122.45 km (76.09 mi)

Major junctions
- East end: Hunsur
- West end: Talakaveri

Location
- Country: India
- State: Karnataka
- Districts: Mysore, Kodagu
- Primary destinations: Hunsur, Gonikoppal, Virajpet, Napoklu, Bhagamandala, Talakaveri

Highway system
- Roads in India; Expressways; National; State; Asian; State Highways in Karnataka

State Highway 90 also known as SH-90 is a state highway connecting Hunsur of Mysore and Talakaveri of Kodagu district, in the South Indian state of Karnataka. It has a total length of 122.45 kilometres (76.09 mi).

Major towns and villages on SH-90 are: Hunsur, Kallahalli, Hunasegala, Muthurayana Hosalli, Manugana Halli, Karnakuppe, Panchavalli, Allur, Muddanahalli, Ane chowkur, Mathigodu (Elephant Camp), Thithimathi, Gonikoppal, Virajpet, Nariyandada, Kakkabbe, Kunjila, Napoklu, Ballamavati, Bhagamandala and Talakaveri.

This highway not only connects south Kodagu to Mysore district, but also connects Kannur district of Kerala to Mysore and Bangalore.

== Junctions ==
NH 275 Terminal near Kallahalli, Hunsur taluk
SH 21 at Ane Chowkur
SH 89 at Gonikoppal
SH 91 at Virajpet
SH 27 near Kadanoor
