= Kutta =

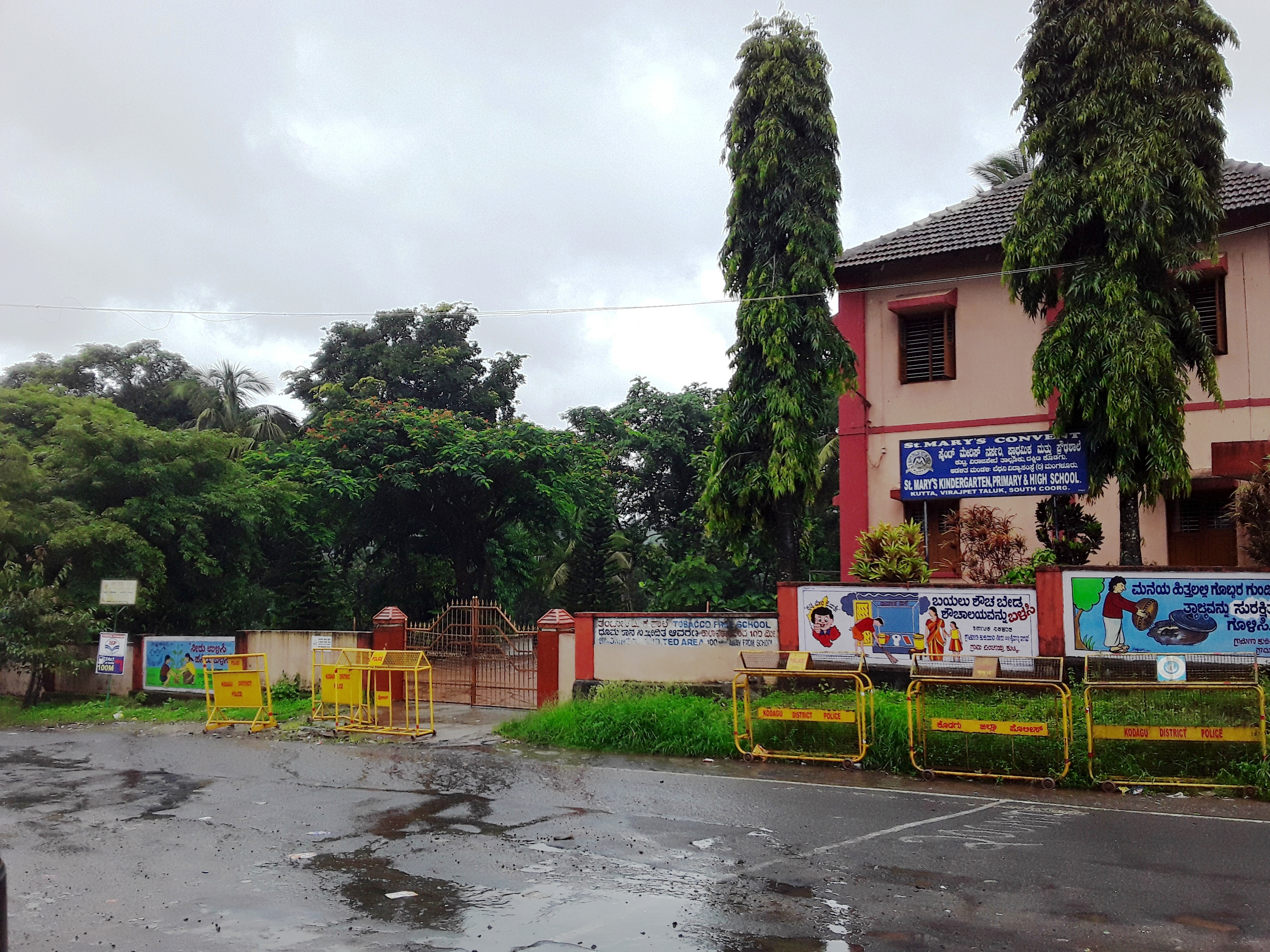
- Kutta school
- Interactive map of Kutta
- Coordinates: 11.96830°N 76.05217°E
- Country: India
- State: Karnataka
- District: Kodagu
- Taluk: Ponnampet

Area
  - Total: 25.58 km^{2} (9.88 sq mi)
- Elevation: 914 m (2,999 ft)

Population
  - Total: 5,291
- Time zone: UTC+5:30 (IST)
- PIN: 571250

Kutta is a small village in Ponnampet taluk of Kodagu, in Karnataka state of India. Location code number of Kutta is 618078.

== Location ==
Kutta is the southern tip of Kodagu district. It is located at a distance of 86 km from district headquarters, Madikeri and 32 km from taluk headquarters, Ponnampet on SH-89 and 260 km from state capital, Bengaluru.

== Geography ==
Kutta is situated at an elevation of 914 metres (2,999 ft) above MSL. The village is bounded by Coffee plantation and Paddy fields to the north, Brahmagiri Mountain Range to the west, Nagarahole to the east and Tholpetty wildlife Sanctuary of Wayanad district to the south. It experiences an annual rainfall of about 2,000 millimetres (79 in). Kutta is situated on SH-89 of Karnataka and no major state highway of Kerala is connected to Kutta. Mananthavady (28 km) and Kalpetta (52 km) are the two major towns of Kerala, near to Kutta.

== National Park and Safari ==
Kutta (Nanchhi Gate) is one of the three entry points to Nagarhole National Park, the other two being Veeranahosalli Gate and Karmadu Gate (Balele-Mysore Road), the latter does not host safari. The Tholpetty wildlife Sanctuary of Kerala, lies south of Kutta village.

== Tourist attractions ==
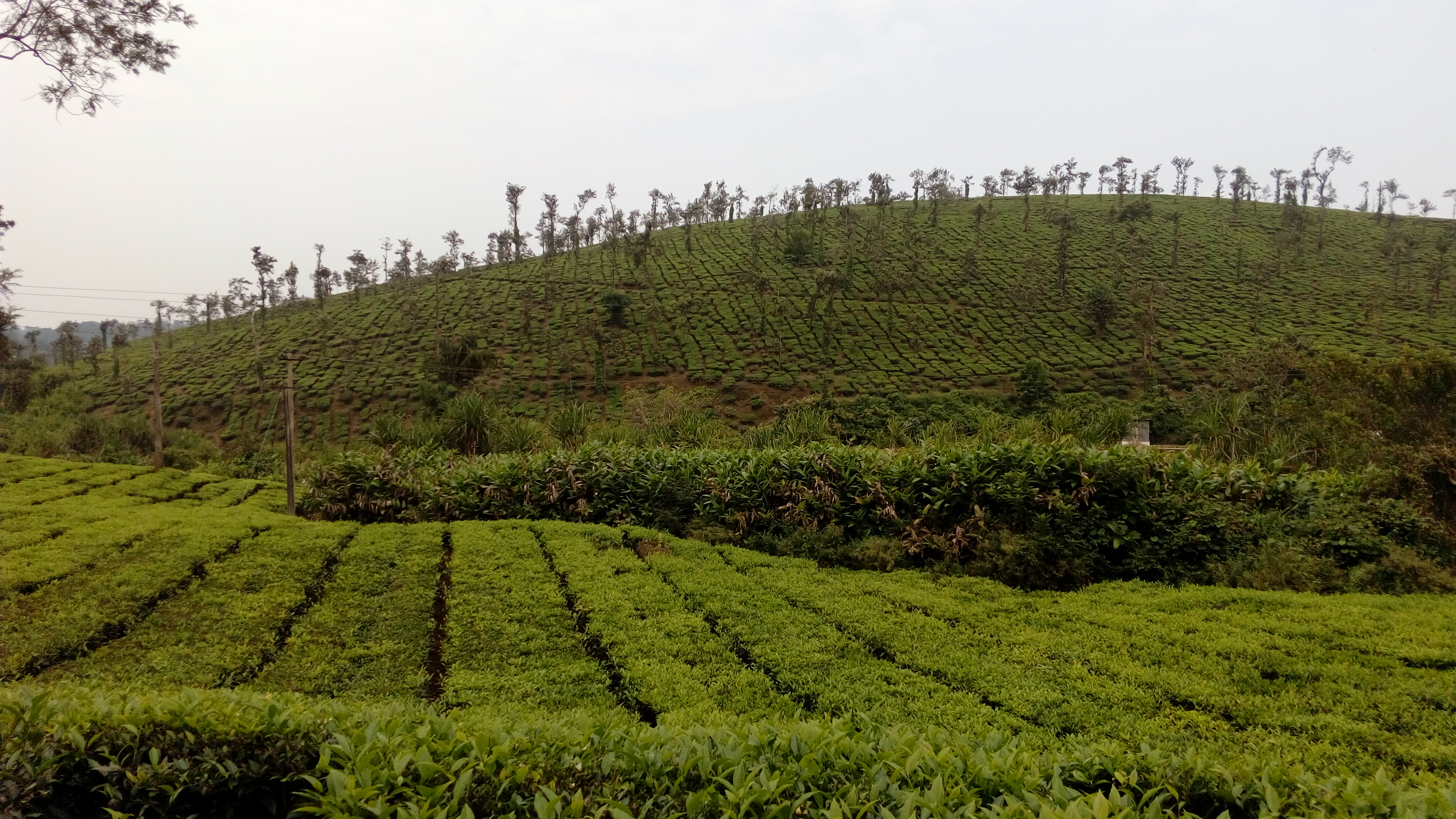
Tata Glenlorna tea estate near Kutta

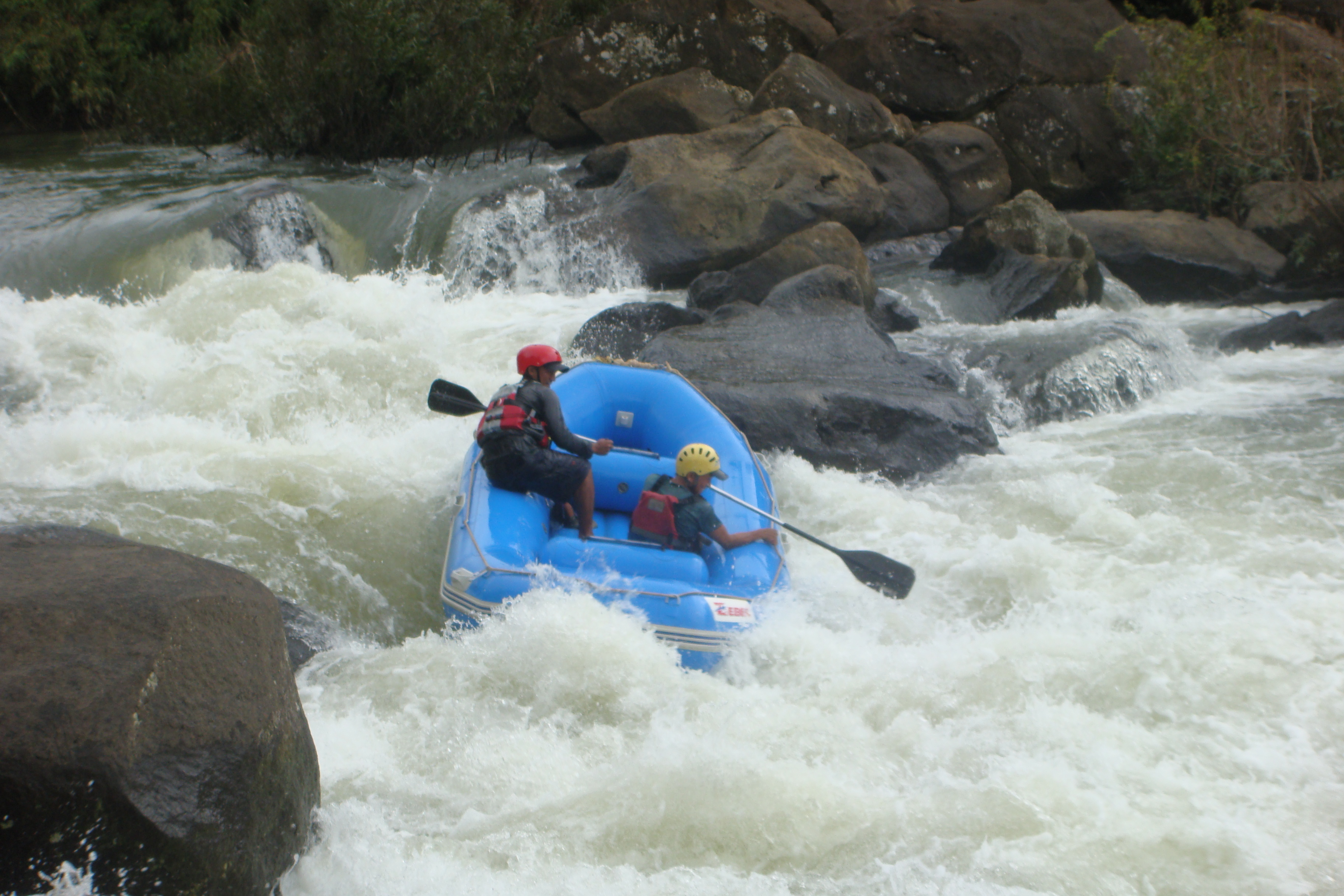
Whitewater rafting near the town

1. Pakshi Pathalam is a hillock near Kutta which can be reached by trekking seven kilometers from Thirunelli temple. There is a cave on the hillock with many bird species.
2. Iruppu Falls
3. Kabini backwaters
4. Brahmagiri Wildlife Sanctuary
5. White water rafting, Barapole river
6. Tadiandamol
7. Banasura Sagar Dam
8. Banasura Hill
9. Chembra Peak
10. SAI Sanctuary

== Transportation & Connectivity ==
Kutta bus station is a terminal for both Karnataka buses and Kerala buses. There is a jeep stand at the end of the street. Nearest Railway stations are Thalassery railway station (106 km) and Mysuru Junction railway station (120 km). Nearest International Airports are Kannur International Airport (106 km), Calicut International Airport (135 km) and Mangalore International Airport (212 km).
