= Changadihalli, Sakleshpura =

Changadihalli
- Village
- Changadihalli
- Location in Karnataka, India
- Coordinates: 12.730813°N 75.847584°E
- Country: India
- State: Karnataka
- District: Hassan
- Taluk: Sakleshpur

Government
  - Body: Grama Panchayath

Area
  - Total: 2.14 km^{2} (0.83 sq mi)
- Elevation: 964 m (3,163 ft)

Population (2011)
  - Total: 641
  - Density: 300/km^{2} (776/sq mi)

Languages
  - Official: Kannada
- Time zone: UTC+5:30 (IST)
- PIN: 573137
- Vehicle registration: KA-46, KA-13

Changadihalli is a village in Sakleshpur taluk in Hassan district of Karnataka, India.

It lies on the junction of State Highway 8 and State Highway 112. Changadihalli is located 38 km from taluk headquarter Sakleshpur, 58 km from district headquarter Hassan and 217 km from the state capital Bangalore.

== Tourism attractions ==
1. Bisle Reserve Forest
2. Patla Betta
3. Mallalli Falls
4. Gorur dam
5. Jenukallu betta, Sakleshpura
