= State Highway 112 (Karnataka) =

Indian road in Tamil Nadu

State Highway 112

Route information
- Maintained by Karnataka Road Development Corporation Limited
- Length: 84 km (52 mi)

Major junctions
- North end: Belur
- South end: Somvarpet

Location
- Country: India
- State: Karnataka
- Primary destinations: Belur, Somvarpet

Highway system
- Roads in India; Expressways; National; State; Asian; State Highways in Karnataka

State Highway 112 is a state highway connecting the towns, Belur of Hassan district and Somvarpet of Kodagu district, in the South Indian state of Karnataka. It has a total length of 84 kilometres (52 mi).

Major towns and villages on the highway are Belur, Bikkodu, Ankihalli, Kakanamane, Bhage and Ballupet (on NH-75), Jammanahalli, Honkaravalli, Kenchammana Hoskote, Harihalli, Kerodi, Yeslur, Changadihalli (on Shanivarsante-Bisle ghat Road), Kalaley, Thadakalu, Kowkudi, Chikkatholur, Gejjehanakodu and Somvarpet.
