= Shanthalli =

- Village
- Shanthalli
- Location in Karnataka, India
- Coordinates: 12°38′32.802″N 75°47′32.2728″E
- Country: India
- State: Karnataka
- District: Kodagu

Government
  - Body: Grama Panchayath

Area
  - Total: 9 km^{2} (3.5 sq mi)
- Elevation: 1,190 m (3,900 ft)

Population (2011)
  - Total: 831
  - Density: 92/km^{2} (240/sq mi)

Languages
  - Official: Kannada
- Time zone: UTC+5:30 (IST)
- PIN: 571236
- Telephone code: 08276
- Vehicle registration: KA-12

Shanthalli is a village in Somwarpet taluk in Kodagu district of Karnataka, India.

It lies on SH-8. Shanthalli is located 11 km from taluk headquarter Somvarpete, 45 km from district headquarter Madikeri and 260 km from the state capital Bengaluru.

The village is famous for its annual fair of local deity, Lord Kumara Lingeshwara. Nearby tourist places are Mallalli Falls and Kumara Parvata hill located at 11 km and 14 km respectively.
