= Vallithode =

- Town
- Location within Kerala
- Coordinates: 12.033°N 75.714°E
- Country: India
- State: Kerala
- District: Kannur
- Taluk: Iritty

Languages
  - Official: Malayalam
- Time zone: UTC+5:30 (IST)
- ISO 3166 code: IN-KL

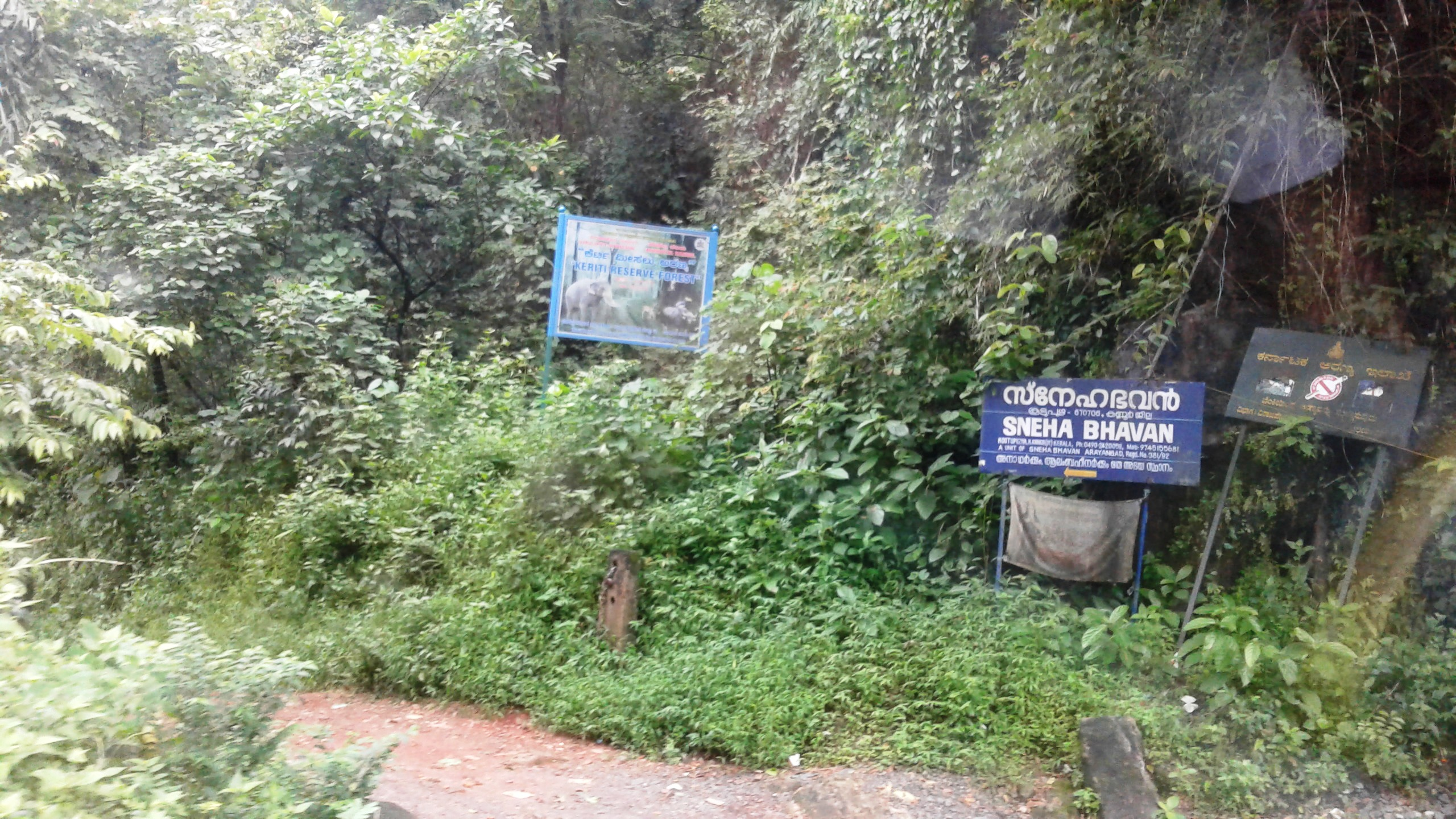
Koottupuzha bridge

Vallithode is a small town in the Iritty taluk of Kannur district in Kerala, India.

== Location ==
Vallithode is located on State Highway 30, the Thalassery Coorg road, between Iritty and Koottupuzha, about 7 kilometres northeast of Iritty and about 6.5 kilometres from Ulikkal and 5 kilometres from the Kerala-Karnataka border.

== Etymology ==
The word "Valli" means vine and "thode" means rivulet, thereby Vallithode means "vine bound rivulet".

== Transportation ==
The national highway passes through Kannur town. Mangalore and Mumbai can be accessed on the northern side and Cochin and Thiruvananthapuram can be accessed on the southern side. The road to the east of Iritty connects to Mysore and Bangalore. The nearest railway station is Thalassery on Mangalore-Palakkad line. There are airports at Mangalore and Calicut.

The highway is scheduled for improvement.
