= Sirangala =

Village in Karnataka, India

Coordinates: 12.562614°N 76.008126°E

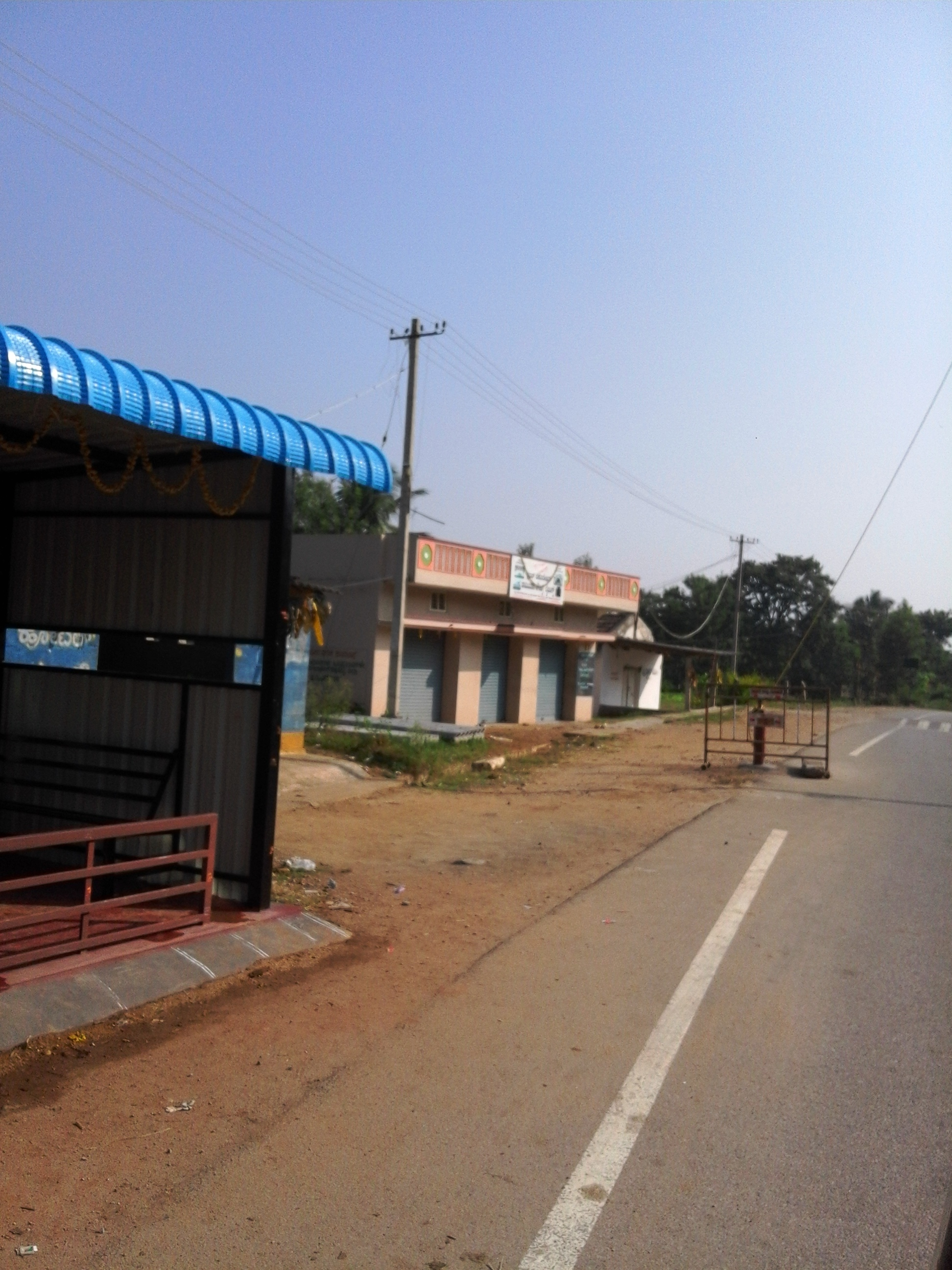
Shirangala checkpost

Shirangala (Kannada: ಶಿರಂಗಾಲ) is a village in Kodagu district of Karnataka state, India.

Shirangala is located between Konanur and Kushalanagar towns on the bank of Cauvery river. Shirangala is 37 km from Madikeri and 19 km from Somvarpet. The distance from Shirangala to Mangalore and Bangalore are 185 km and 209 km respectively.

== Post office ==
There is a post office in the village and the postal code is 571232.

== Administration ==
Shirangala is administered as part of Somavarpet taluk in Kodagu district.

== Villages and suburbs ==
- Kudige - 10 km
- Nerugalale - 14 km
- Mullusoge - 15 km
- Siddapurgate - 5 km
- Manajuru - 1.5 km
- Seegodu - 4 km
- Kadavinahosahalli - 2.0 km

== Image gallery ==
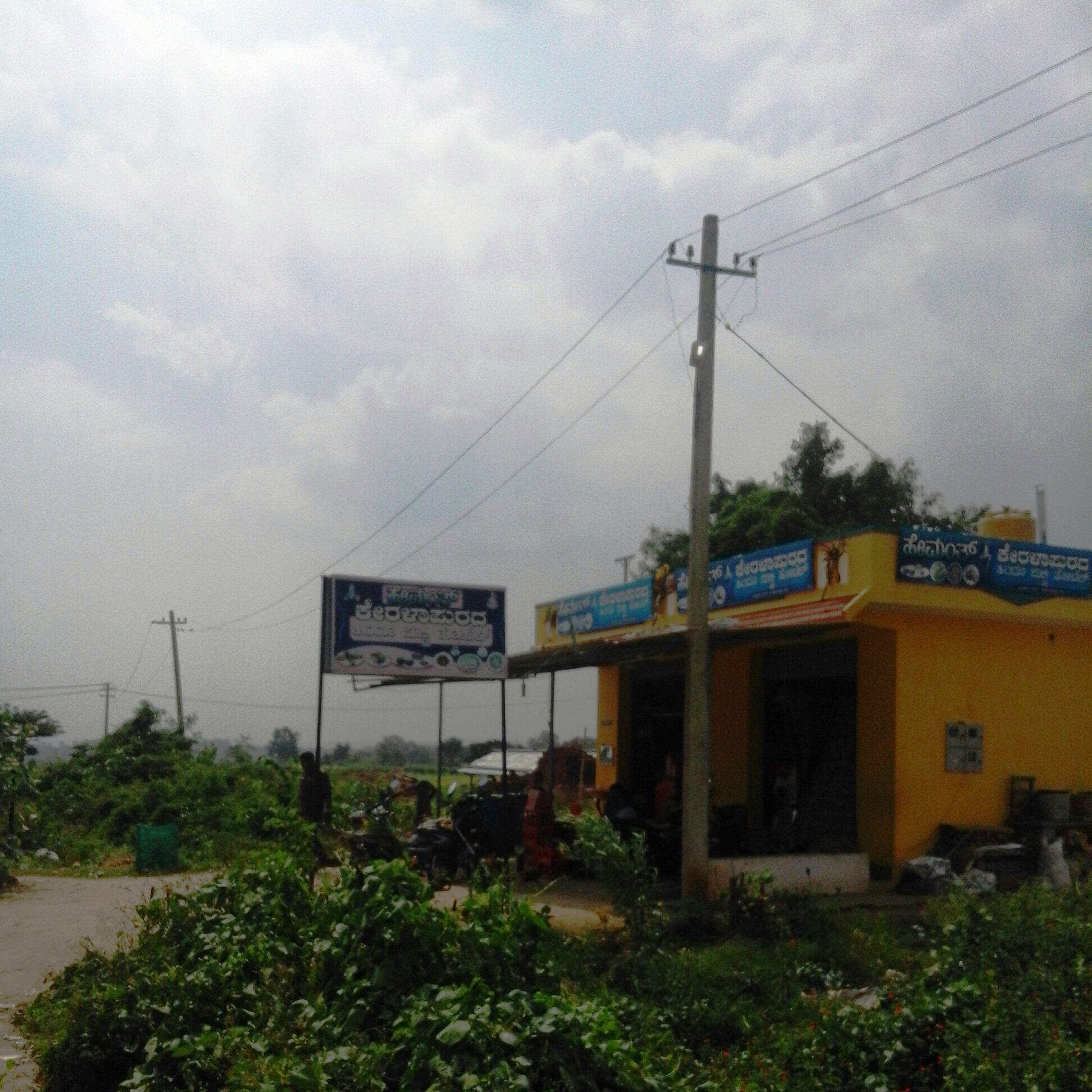
Siddapurgate

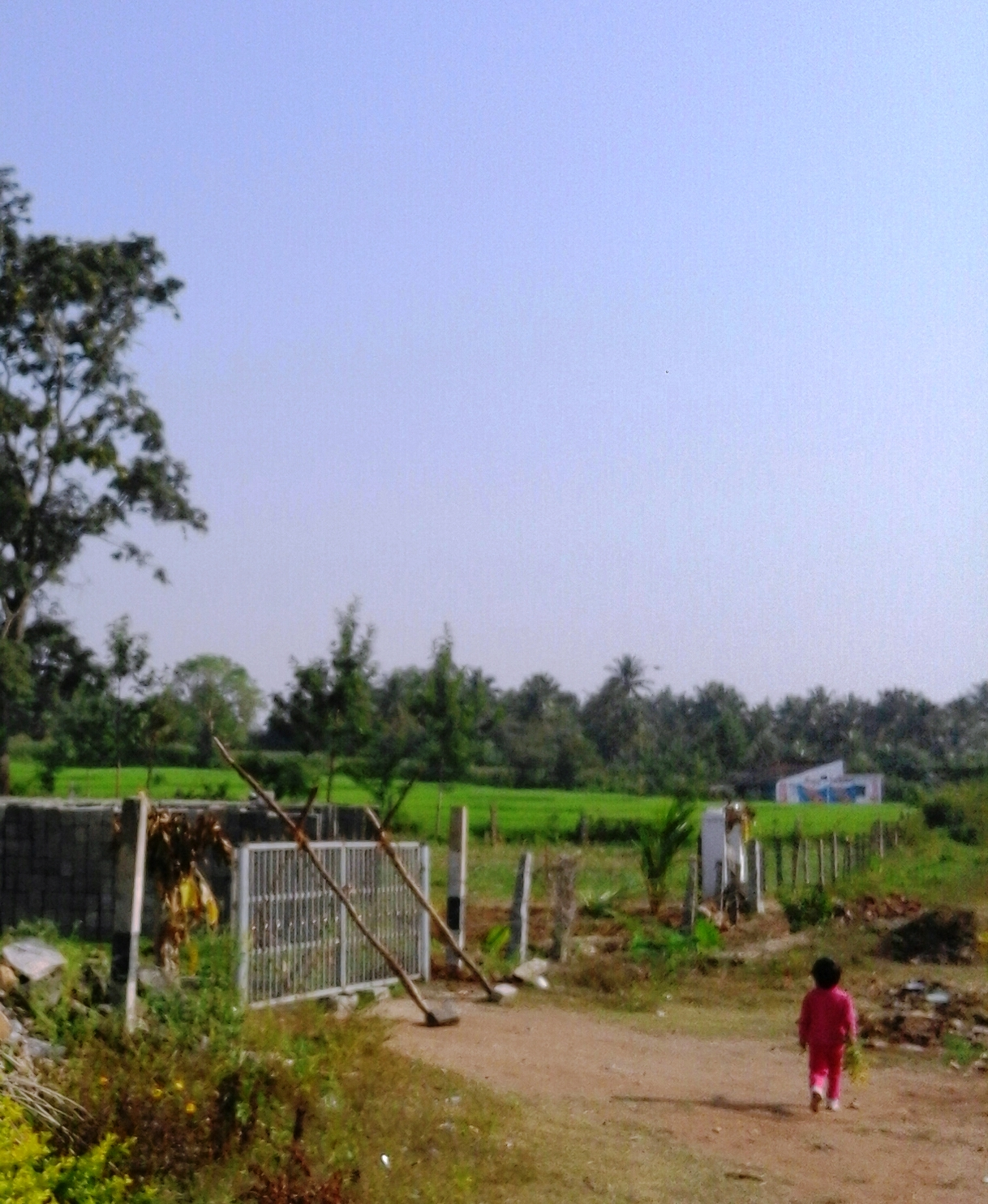
Manajuru village

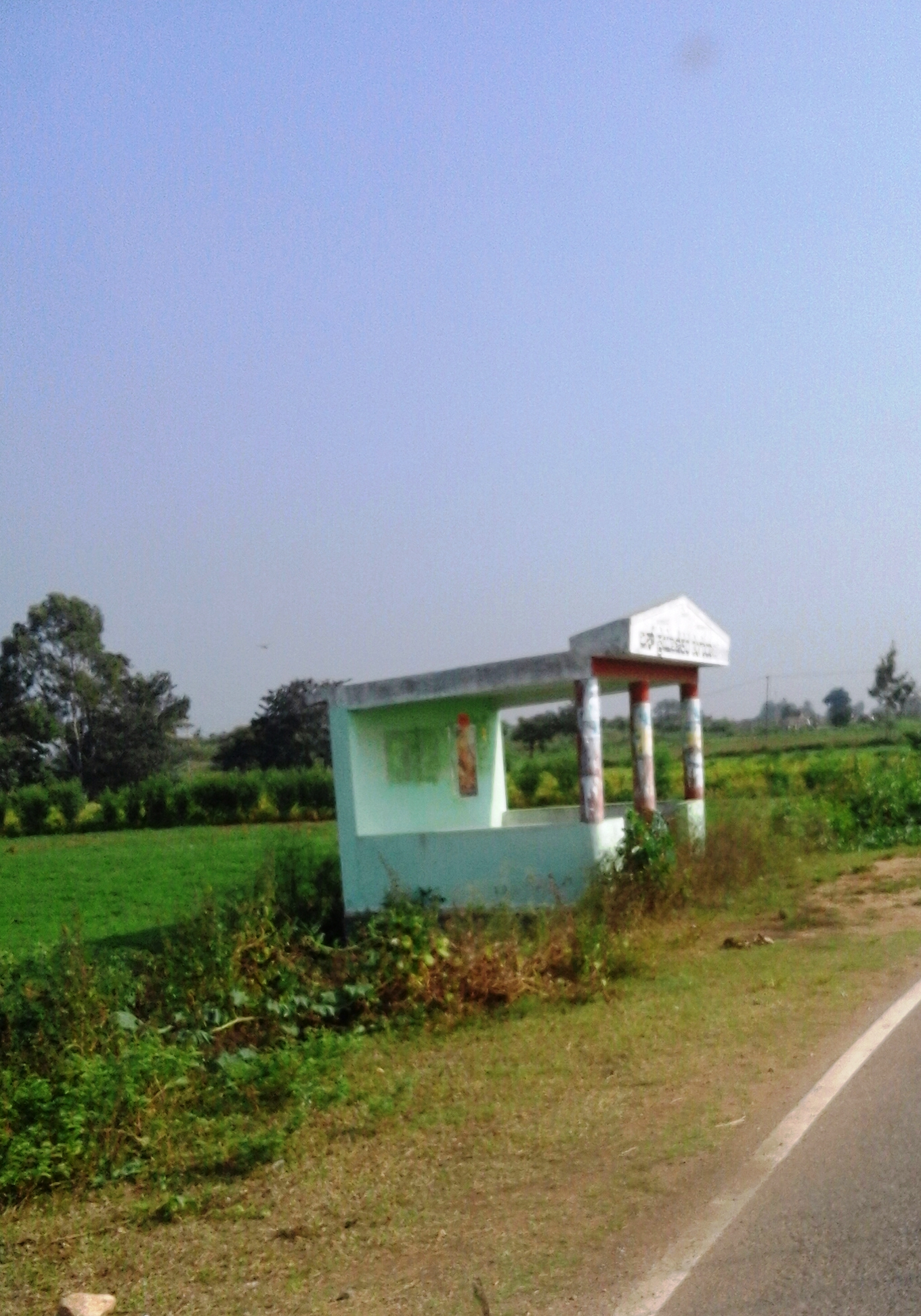
Seegodu village
