= Madathil =

Madathil is a Malayali surname. Notable people with the surname include:

- Kumaran Madathil (1920–1995), Indian politician
- Sajitha Madathil (fl. 1991), Indian actress
- Venugopal Madathil (born 1966), Indian cinematographer
