= Kaikeri =

Coordinates: 12°11′N 75°54′E

- village
- Interactive map of Kaikeri
- Country: India
- State: Karnataka
- District: Kodagu
- Talukas: Virajpet

Population (2001)
  - Total: 5,176

Languages
  - Official: Kannada
- Time zone: UTC+5:30 (IST)

Kaikeri is a village in the southern state of Karnataka, India. It is located in the Virajpet taluk of Kodagu district.

== Demographics ==
As of 2001 India census, Kaikeri had a population of 5176 with 2619 males and 2557 females.

== See also ==
- Kodagu
- Districts of Karnataka
