= Eranholi =

- Census Town
- Location in Kerala, India Eranholi (India)
- Coordinates: 11.763°N 75.510°E
- Country: India
- State: Kerala
- District: Kannur

Area
  - Total: 10.08 km^{2} (3.89 sq mi)

Population (2011)
  - Total: 25,818
  - Density: 2,561/km^{2} (6,634/sq mi)

Languages
  - Official: Malayalam, English
- Time zone: UTC+5:30 (IST)
- PIN: 670107
- ISO 3166 code: IN-KL
- Vehicle registration: KL 58

Eranholi is a census town and Grama Panchayat of Kannur district in the state of Kerala, India,. It is located on Tellichery Coorg road and the nearest town is Thalassery. Eranholi bridge built across Eranholi river in 1937 which is entry to Tellicherry.The Eranholi Bridge is a significant bridge of TC Road.

The College of Engineering, Thalassery is located at Kundoormala, a hilly area near Eranholi.

== Demographics ==
As of 2011 Census, Eranholi had a population of 25,818. Males constitute 45.5% of the population and females 54.5%. Eranholi census town has an area of 10.08 km^{2} (3.89 sq mi) with 6,042 families residing in it. The average sex ratio was 1199 higher than state average of 1084. Eranholi had an average literacy rate of 98.3%, higher than state average of 94%: male literacy was 98.8%, and female literacy was 97.9%. In Eranholi, 8.6% of the population is under 6 years of age.

== Transportation ==
The national highway passes through Thalassery town. Goa and Mumbai can be accessed on the northern side and Cochin and Thiruvananthapuram can be accessed on the southern side. The road to the east of Iritty connects to Mysore and Bangalore. The nearest railway station is Thalassery on Mangalore-Palakkad line. Trains are available to almost all parts of India subject to advance booking over the internet. There are airports at Mangalore, Calicut and new airport Kannur International Airport which is located 25 kilometers away . All of them are international airports but direct flights are available only to Middle Eastern countries. Water transport project is an upcoming project in Eranholi

== See also ==
- Tellicherry
