= Chettalli =

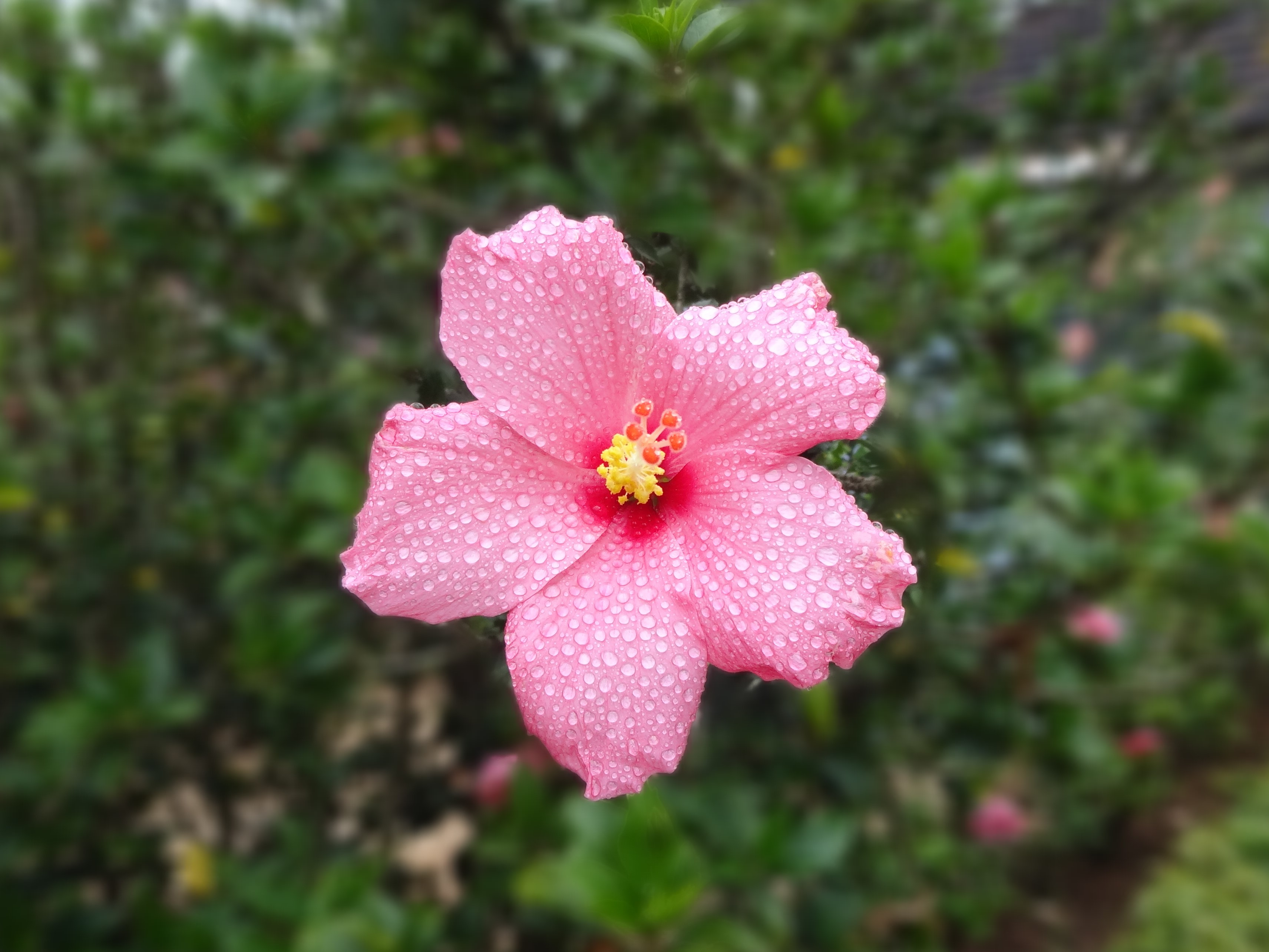
- Hibiscus seen at Chettalli
- Interactive map of Chettalli
- Coordinates: 12.37056°N 75.83164°E
- Country: India
- State: Karnataka
- District: Kodagu

Area
  - Total: 7.14 km^{2} (2.76 sq mi)
- Elevation: 1,020 m (3,350 ft)

Population (2011)
  - Total: 1,128
- Time zone: UTC+5:30 (IST)
- PIN: 571248

Chettalli is a small village near Siddapura, Kodagu in Karnataka state, India.

== Post office ==
Chettalli has a post office and the pin code is 571248. The telephone code of the village is 08276.

== CHES, Chettalli ==
Indian Institute of Horticultural Research maintains a Central Horticultural Experiment Station (CHES) at Chettalli. It is the largest facility of its kind in Asia and a lot of research work is being done here. The station works on the mandate crop of mandarin out of an area of 92 hectares in Coorg. The other crops of interest are papaya and passion fruit as well as minor fruits like rambutan, pummelo, avocado, mangosteen, karonda, Malayan apple and Garcinia. The station is also involved in the floricultural of rose, asters, gladiolus and orchids.

== Coffee Research Station ==
Chettalli has one coffee research center concentrating on the cultivation and diseases of coffee.

== Administration ==
Chettalli is administered as part of kushalnagar taluk in Kodagu district.

== Tourism ==
Chettali attracts many visitors because of the undulating nature of the hills.

Cherala Bhagavathy Temple is also very popular.

== Demographics ==
The people in Chettalli speak Kannada, Kodava and Tulu, Arebhashe (Gowda People)

== See also ==
- Madikeri
- Mangalore
- Virajpet
- Somwarpet
