= Adiganahalli, Bengaluru Urban district =

Adiganahalli
- village
- Adiganahalli (Bangalore North) is in Bangalore district
- Interactive map of Adiganahalli
- Coordinates: 13.1717°N 77.5703°E
- Country: India
- State: Karnataka
- District: Bangalore
- Talukas: Bangalore North

Government
  - Body: Village Panchayat

Languages
  - Official: Kannada
- Time zone: UTC+5:30 (IST)
- PIN: 560 064
- Nearest city: Bangalore
- Civic agency: Village Panchayat

Adiganahalli (Bangalore North) is a village in the southern state of Karnataka, India. It is located in the Bangalore North taluk of Bangalore district in Karnataka.

== Demographics ==
As of 2011 India census, A Medihalli had a population of 2,141. Males constitute 1,133 of the population and females 1,008. Kannada is the official and most widely spoken language in A Medihalli. A Medihalli has an average literacy rate of 73.75 percent, higher than the national average of 59.5 percent, with 78.99 percent of the males and 67.86 percent of females literate.
