= State Highway 88 (Karnataka) =

State highway in Karnataka, India

State Highway 88

Route information
- Maintained by Karnataka Road Development Corporation Limited
- Length: 220 km (140 mi)

Major junctions
- East end: Mysore
- West end: Bantwal

Location
- Country: India
- State: Karnataka
- Districts: Mysore, Kodagu, Dakshina Kannada
- Primary destinations: Hunsur, Periyapatna, Bylakuppe, Kushalanagar, Madikeri, Sulya, Puttur

Highway system
- Roads in India; Expressways; National; State; Asian; State Highways in Karnataka

State Highway 88 is a state highway connecting Mysore and Bantwal in the South Indian state of Karnataka. It has a total length of 220 kilometres (140 mi). It connects Mysore with the hill station of Madikeri and the port city of Mangalore. The road is also used as an alternate route to connect Mysore to Northern Kerala via Hunsur, Gonikoppa and Kutta. In 2010, the Karnataka Police deployed police vehicles to ensure safety on the highway. The road is maintained by the Karnataka Road Development Corporation Limited.

== 2013 damage ==
In August 2013, Kodagu district administration had closed down the road after water seepage from incessant rainfall had caused huge cracks to develop on the road.

== See also ==
- List of state highways in Karnataka
- National Highway 48 (India)
