= Ponnampet =

Ponnampet Ponnampete Ponnapett
- Town
- Ponnampete
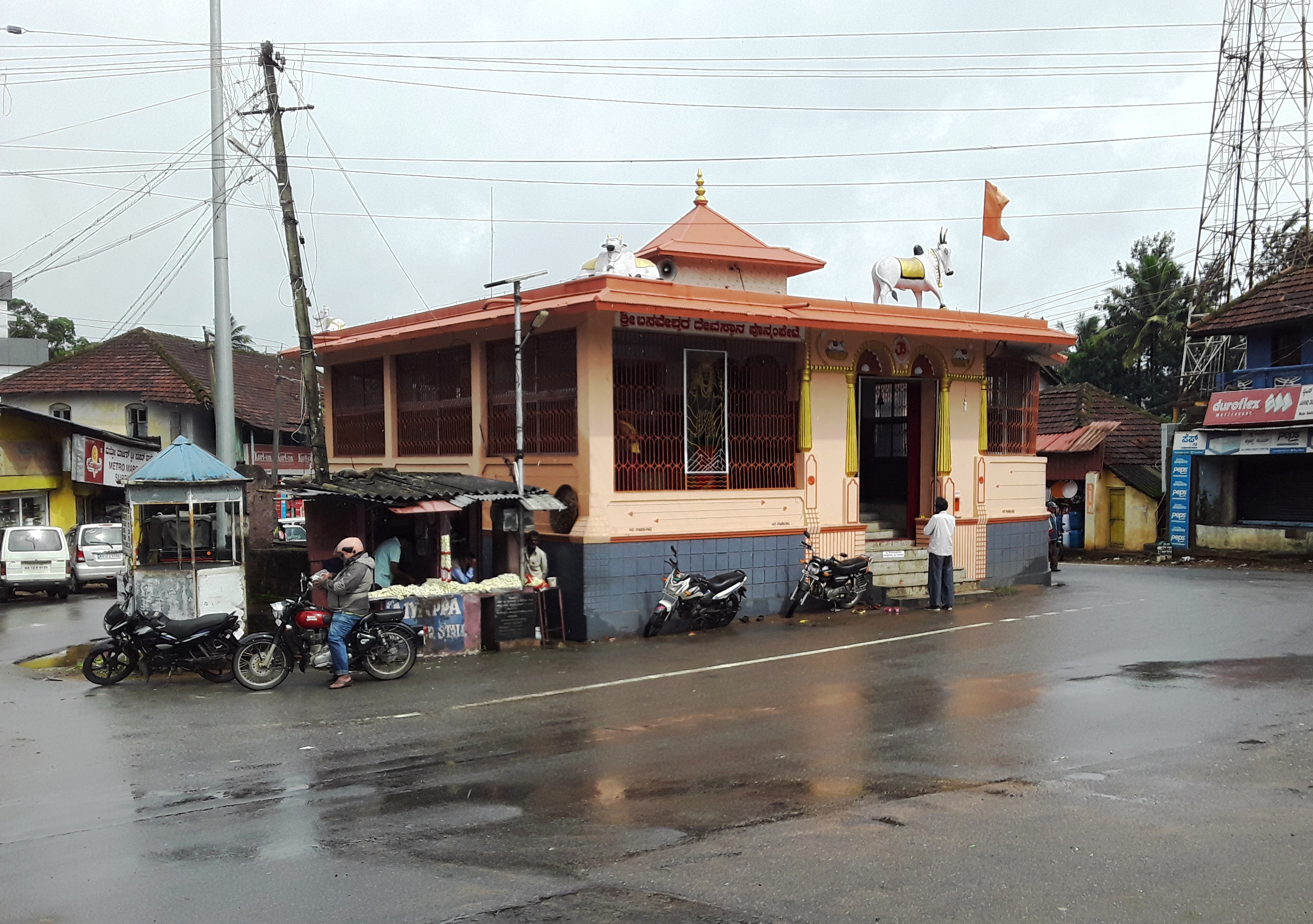
- Ponnampet town

- Location in Karnataka, India
- Coordinates: 12.145870°N 75.944392°E
- Country: India
- State: Karnataka
- District: Kodagu
- Established: 1821

Government
  - Body: Town Panchayath

Area
  - Total: 11.34 km^{2} (4.38 sq mi)
- Elevation: 851 m (2,792 ft)

Population (2025)
  - Total: 11,137
  - Density: 982.1/km^{2} (2,544/sq mi)

Languages
  - Official: Kannada
- Time zone: UTC+5:30 (IST)
- PIN: 571216
- Telephone code: 08274
- Vehicle registration: KA-12

Ponnampet or Ponnampete (Kodava: [ponːɐmpeːʈe]) is a taluk headquarters in the southern part of the district of Kodagu in the state of Karnataka. Ponnampet taluk came into existence on 29 November 2020.

It was originally named after Diwan Cheppudira Ponnappa as Ponnapett. It was established in the year 1821 in the name of the Late Diwan under the regime of Kodagu Rajas.

The town was called notified area in the period of British and later on it was converted into a Municipality and then into a (1^{st} Grade)Village Panchayath. Ponnampet was a Taluk Headquarters during Pre-Independence Period, but was absorbed into Virajpet taluk later, to be again revived recently in the year 2020. The town was upgraded to Town Panchayath in the year 2025.

== Demography ==
Ponnampet belongs to Halligattu grama panchayath and has a population of 6,473 according to 2011 census. A college of forestry formerly a part of the University of Agricultural Sciences, Bangalore, now affiliated with the UAHS, Shivamogga is located here. A hill known as Kundah overlooks the town.

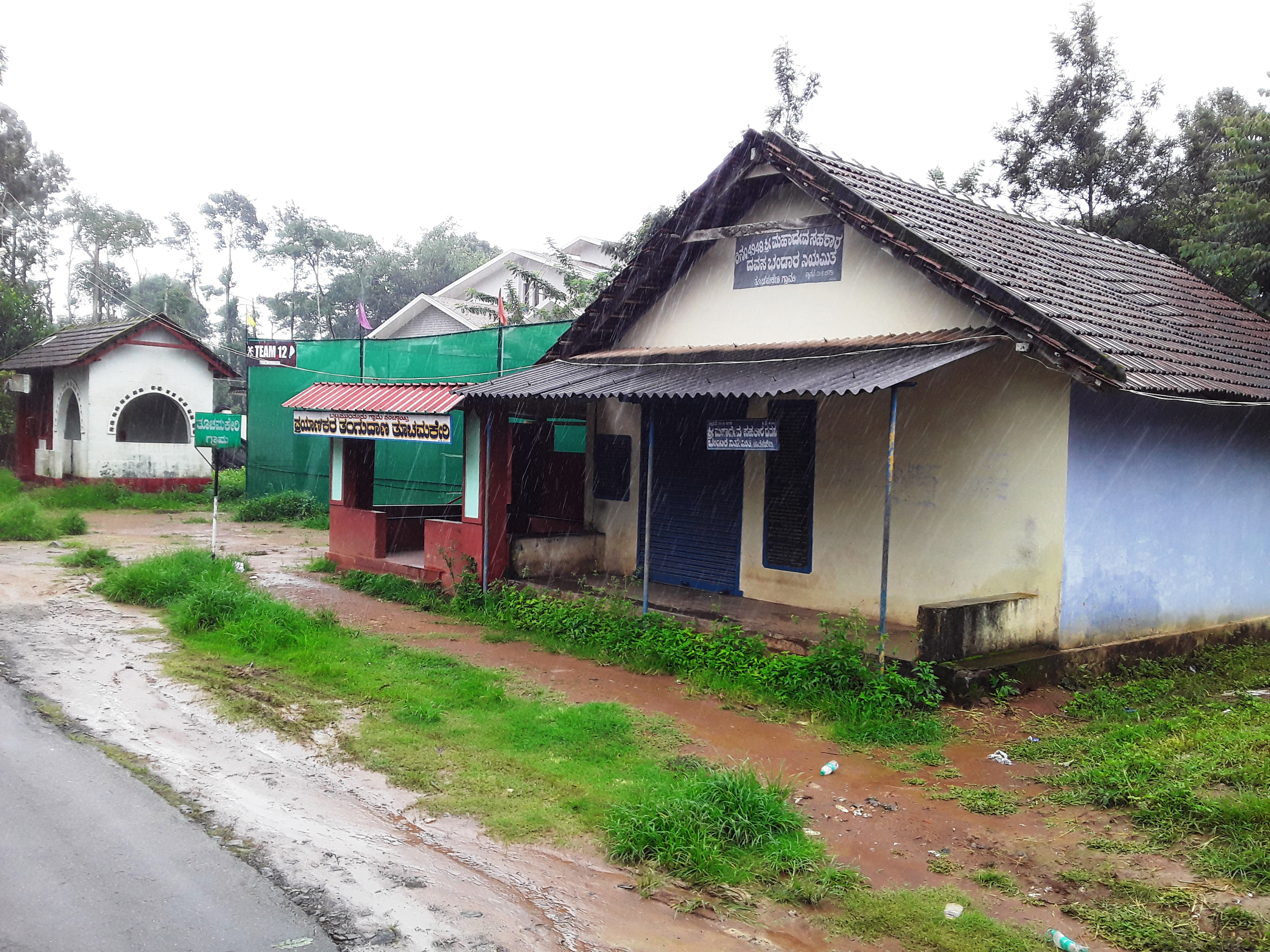
Chikkamandur, Ponnampet

== Location ==
Ponnampet is located 52 km south from its district headquarter, Madikeri on State Highway 89. It is 93 km from Mysuru and 227 km from the state capital, Bengaluru.

The nearest railway station is Mysore Junction and nearest airport is Kannur International Airport (74 km).

== Rainfall ==
In the year 2024, Ponnampete hoblis received 2,055 millimetres (80.9 in) of rainfall, -9% departure from normal 2267 millimeters.

== Administration and government ==
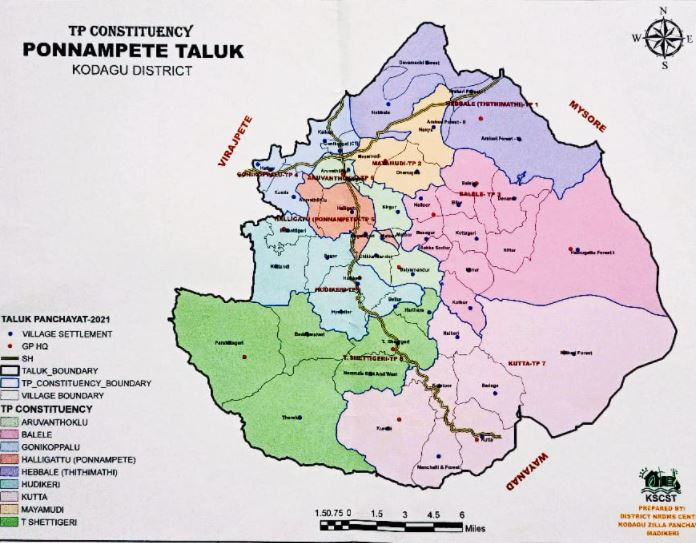
Ponnampet Taluk Map

Major Government offices here are the following:

- Ponnampet Taluk Panchayath Office (Executive Officer)
- Civil Court
- Sub Treasury
- Sub Registrars Office
- Horticulture Office
- Women and Child Welfare Office
- Village Panchayath Office
- Nad Office (Deputy Thasildhar Office)
- Range Forest Office
- PWD Office
- CESCOM office
- Post Office

Since Ponnampet taluk was carved out from Virajpet, the new taluk comprises four hoblis: Kasaba i.e Ponnampet itself, Balele, Hudikeri and Srimangala.

== Landmarks ==
- Various Banks like DCC Bank, SBI, Canara Bank, Igguthappa Souhardha Bank, Town Cop Bank, APCMS, Corporation Bank, Primary Agriculture and Credit Co-op bank, APCMS.
- Sports Facilities like Astro Turf Ground, Sports School
- Inspection Bungalow
- Kodava Samaj
- Veterinary Hospital
- Ramakrishna Sharada Seva Ashram Hospital
- Agriculture Research Centre
- BSNL Office - Telephone Exchange
- Mahila Co-op Society
- Police Station
- Swami Vivekananda Ashram Hospital

In addition to this within 5 kilometres the Gonikoppal town in which Krishi Vigyan Kendra (KVK), Cauvery degree college, Coffee Board Research Centre, many schools and college, a circle inspector office, KEB - AEE office are also located here.

== Education ==
- Appachakavi Vidyalaya
- St. Antonys school
- Sai Shankar Institutions
- Govt Junior College
- Industrial Training Institute (ITI)
- PU and Degree Colleges
- B.Ed College
- Social Welfare Office - Hostels (Boys and Girls)
- Coorg Institute of Technology
- College of Forestry
