= Pollibetta =

- Interactive map of Pollibetta
- Coordinates: 12.23988°N 75.91931°E
- Country: India
- State: Karnataka
- District: Kodagu
- Time zone: UTC+5:25 (IST)
- PIN: 571215

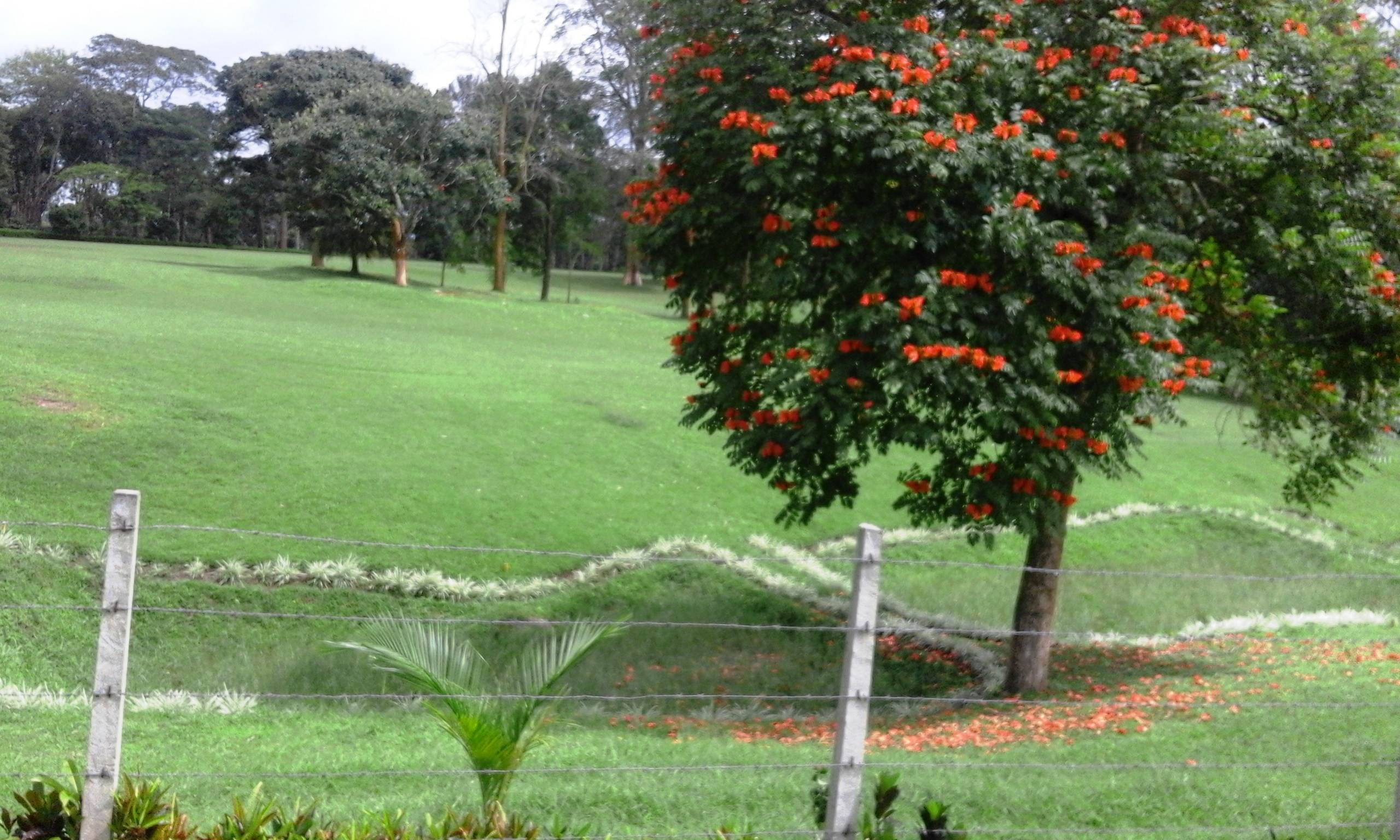
Golf course at Pollibetta

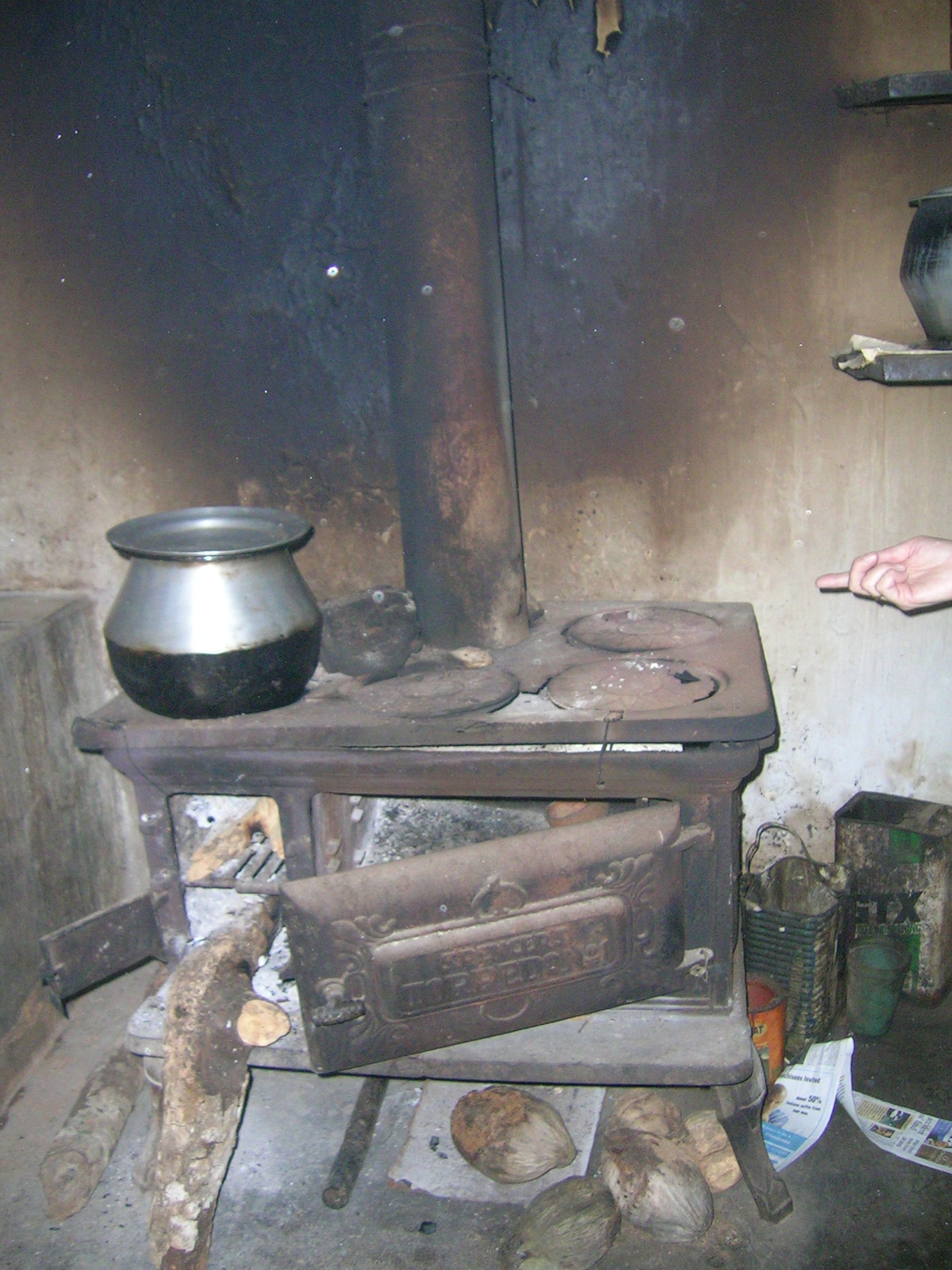
Old fashioned Spencer woodstove in a British building in Pollibetta

Pollibetta is a small village in Kodagu district of Karnataka state, India.

== Location ==
Pollibetta is a small town in the southern part of Kodagu district. This town falls under Virajapet taluk and is located between Gonikoppal, Siddapura and Ammathi towns. The distance to Gonikoppa is 9.4 kilometers, the distance to Ammathi is 8.8 km, the distance to Siddapura is 11 kilometers and the distance to Virajpet is 27.8 km.

== Post office ==
There is a post office in Polibetta village. The pincode is 571215.

== History ==
A British company called Pollibetta Coffee Estates Company Limited, London managed by Matheson and Company started a tea company in Pollibetta in 1943. In 1960, the company sold the shares to Indian public. In 1966, the company was renamed Consolidated Coffee Limited. Tata Tea Limited acquired the company in 1992. In 2000, the company was renamed Tata Coffee Limited.

== Education Institutions ==
Government Schools: Government Model Primary School and Namma High School. Private School: Lourdes Hill Convent School Mekur Hosakeri
