= Napoklu =

- Village
- Napoklu
- Location in Karnataka, India
- Coordinates: 12.306988°N 75.687820°E
- Country: India
- State: Karnataka
- District: Kodagu
- Taluk: Madikeri

Government
  - Body: Grama Panchayath

Area
  - Total: 12.24 km^{2} (4.73 sq mi)
- Elevation: 904 m (2,966 ft)

Population (2011)
  - Total: 3,429
  - Density: 280.1/km^{2} (725.6/sq mi)

Languages
  - Official: Kannada
- Time zone: UTC+5:30 (IST)
- PIN: 571214
- Telephone code: 08272
- Vehicle registration: KA-12

Napoklu is a village in Madikeri taluk in Kodagu district of Karnataka, India. As per census survey of India 2011, the location code number of Napoklu is 617851.

Napoklu is located 21 km from its district headquarter Madikeri and 265 km from the state capital Bengaluru.

== Geography ==
Napoklu is located towards western half of the district. Kaveri River flows in the outskirts of the village. There are no major state highways passing through Napoklu. It has hot and wet type of climate. Major crops grown here are Paddy, Coffee and Black Pepper.

=== Rainfall ===
In 2018, Napoklu received an annual rainfall of 5,278 millimetres (207.8 in). In 2022, it received 3,260 millimetres (128 in) of annual rainfall.
