= Brahmagiri Wildlife Sanctuary =

Wildlife sanctuary in India

- IUCN category IV (habitat/species management area)
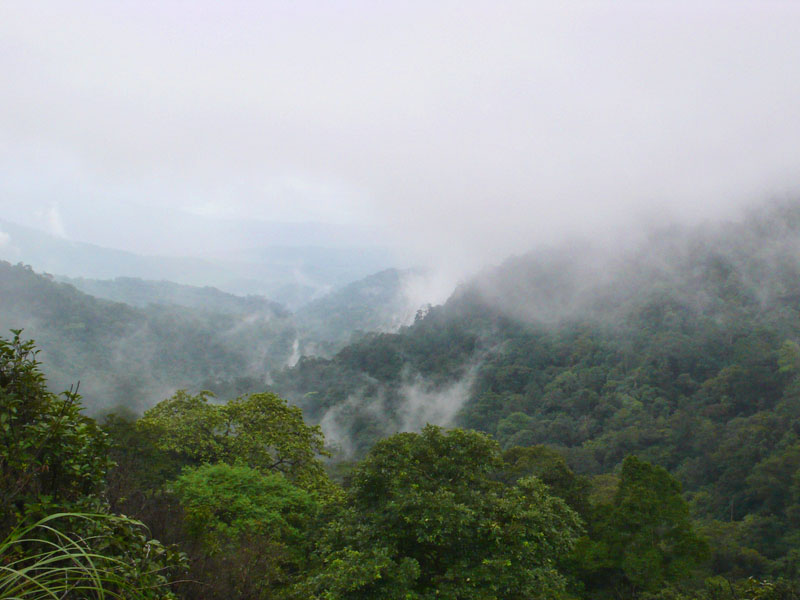
- Valley within the Brahmagiri Wildlife Sanctuary, Karnataka State

- Location within Karnataka Location within India
- Interactive map of Brahmagiri Wildlife Sanctuary
- Location: India
- Coordinates: 12.387°N 75.491°E
- Area: 181 km^{2} (70 sq mi)
- Established: June 5, 1974; 52 years ago

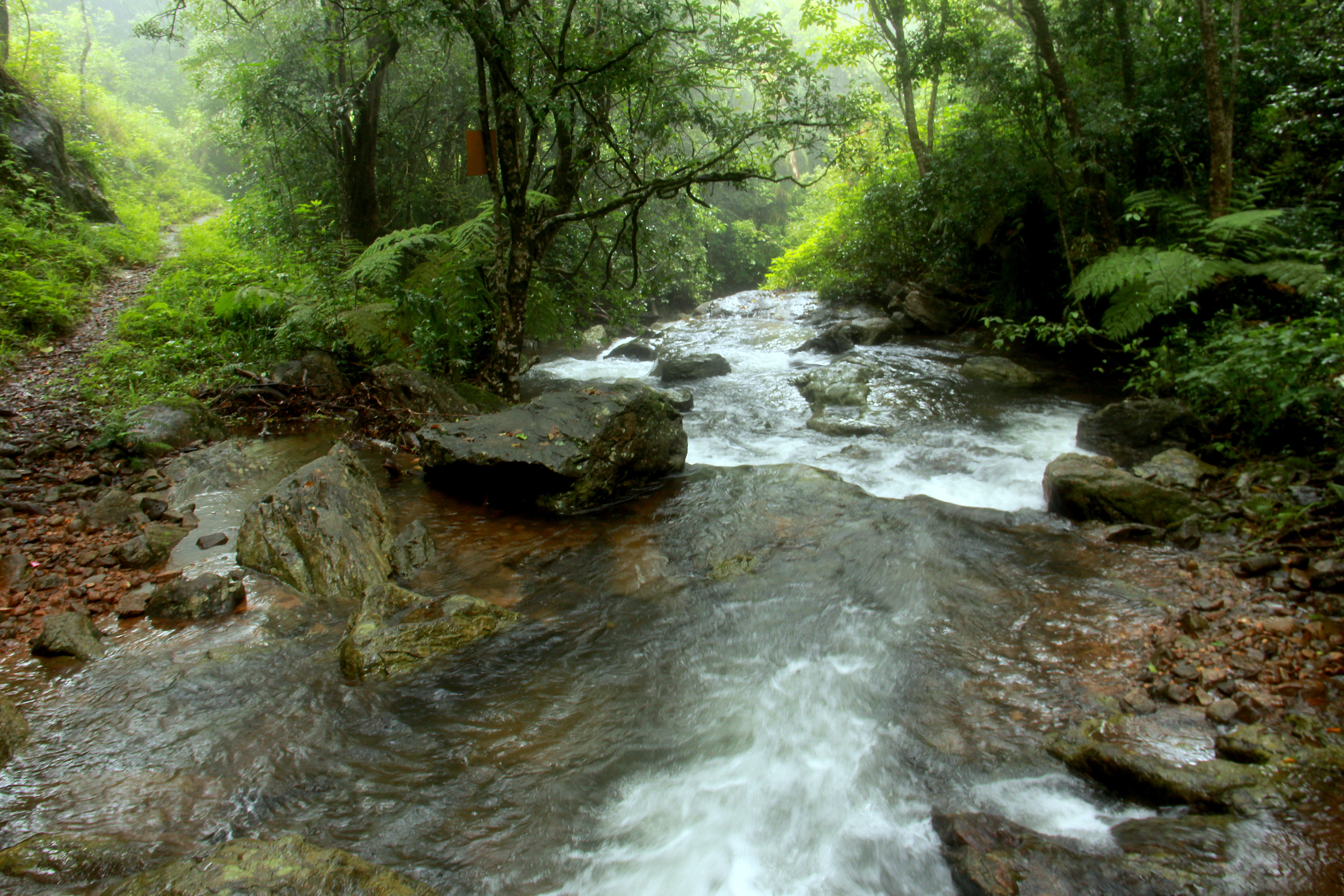
Brahmagiri River passing through Brahmagiri Wildlife Sanctuary

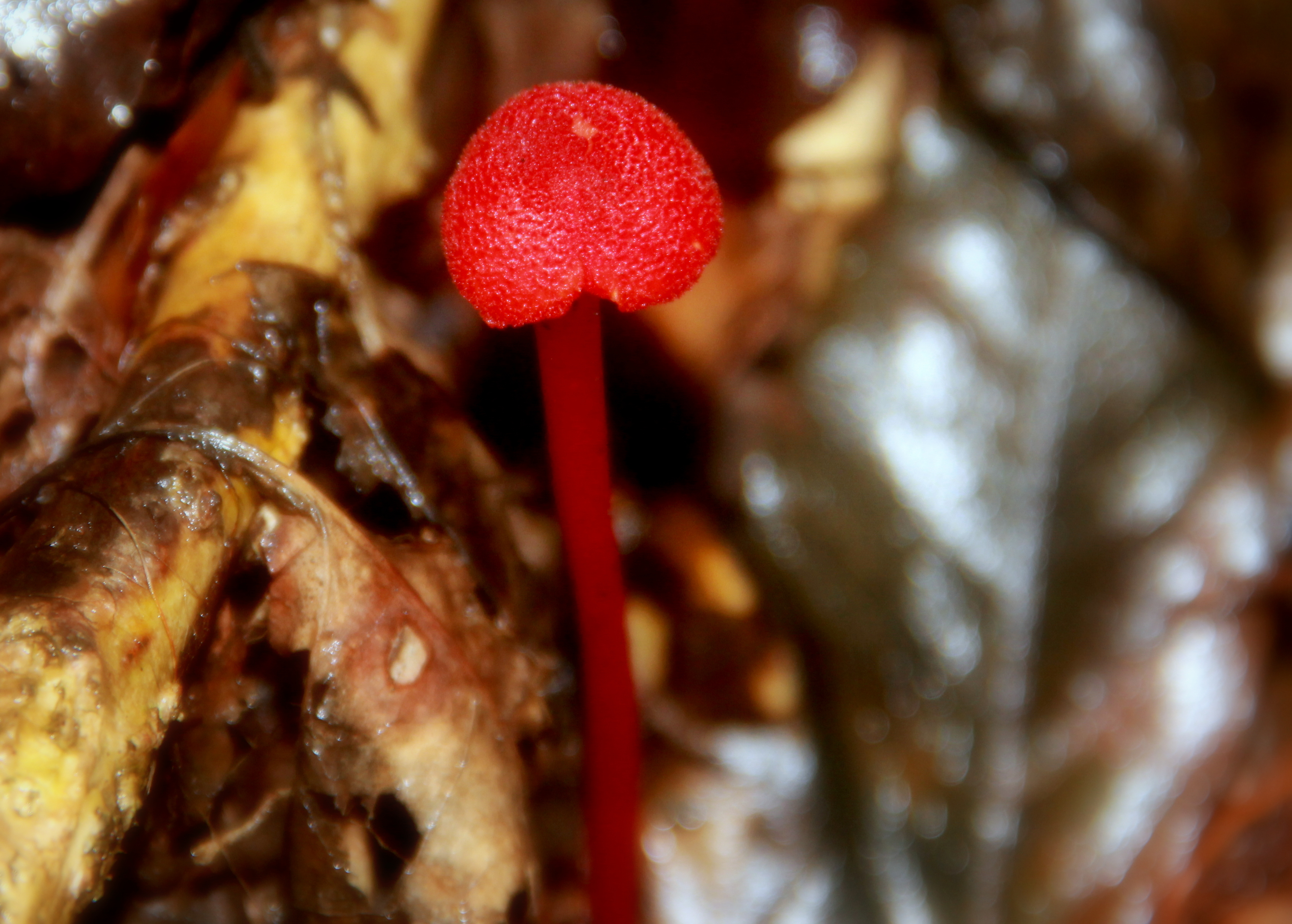
Poisonous red mushroom found in Brahmagiri Wildlife Sanctuary

The Brahmagiri Wildlife Sanctuary is located in Kodagu District, Karnataka State, India, within the Western Ghats and about 250 km from Bengaluru. The sanctuary derives its name from the highest peak of the mountain range, Brahmagiri Peak. It was declared a sanctuary in 1974. Brahmagiri Wildlife Sancturay is bordered by Kannur District and Wayanad Districts in Kerala.

== Wildlife ==
=== Flora ===
The sanctuary contains evergreen and semi-evergreen forests, and in the higher altitudes are grasslands with shola. Bamboo plants are widespread.

=== Fauna ===
Mammals in the sanctuary include lion-tailed macaques, Indian elephants, gaurs, tigers, jungle cats, leopard cats, wild dogs, sloth bears, wild pigs, sambars, spotted deer, Nilgiri langurs, slender loris, bonnet macaques, common langurs, barking deer, mouse deer, Malabar giant squirrels, giant flying squirrels, Nilgiri martens, common otters, brown mongooses, civets, porcupines, and pangolins.

Pythons, cobras, king cobras, and malabar pit vipers are also found in the sanctuary, as are birds such as emerald doves, square-tailed bulbuls and Malabar trogons.
