= Siddapura, Kodagu =

Siddapura
- Village
- Siddapura
- Location in Karnataka, India
- Coordinates: 12.29664°N 75.87524°E
- Country: India
- State: Karnataka
- District: Kodagu
- Taluk: Virajpet

Government
  - Body: Grama Panchayath

Area
  - Total: 6.7 km^{2} (2.6 sq mi)
- Elevation: 900 m (3,000 ft)

Population (2011)
  - Total: 1,718
  - Density: 260/km^{2} (660/sq mi)

Languages
  - Official: Kannada
- Time zone: UTC+5:30 (IST)
- PIN: 571253
- Telephone code: 08274
- Vehicle registration: KA-12

Siddapur or Siddapura is a village in Kodagu district, Karnataka, in India. It is situated in a coffee growing region near the river Kaveri.

Siddapura-Nelliya Hudikeri form a twin town (the latter belonging to Kushalnagar taluk), only to be separated by Kaveri river

== Temples ==
- Ganapathi temple, shri rama mandira siddapaura
- Ayyappa Temple, Virajpet road
- Gowri Shankara Temple, Old Siddapur
- Sri Chamundeshwari Temple
- shri muttappa bhagavathi temple

== Tourism ==
Siddapura has won the reputation as a tourist destination for those who wish to spend a few days in the middle of a coffee estate. Orange County resorts have started a property here meant for upmarket international clients.

== Education ==
- Convent School, Virajpet Road.

== See also ==
- Madikeri
- Mangalore
- Virajpet
