= Hunsur =

Town in Karnataka, India

Hunsur Hunasuru
- City
- Location in Karnataka, India Hunsur (India)
- Coordinates: 12.3105671°N 76.2802055°E
- Country: India
- State: Karnataka
- District: Mysore

Government
  - Body: City Municipal Council

Area
  - City: 11.76 km^{2} (4.54 sq mi)
  - Rural: 886.11 km^{2} (342.13 sq mi)
- Elevation: 792 m (2,598 ft)

Population (2011)
  - City: 50,865
  - Density: 4,325/km^{2} (11,200/sq mi)
  - Rural: 232,098

Languages
  - Official: Kannada
- Time zone: UTC+5:30 (IST)
- PIN: 571 105
- Telephone code: 08222
- Vehicle registration: KA-45
- Wards: 31
- Website: www.hunsurcity.mrc.gov.in/kn

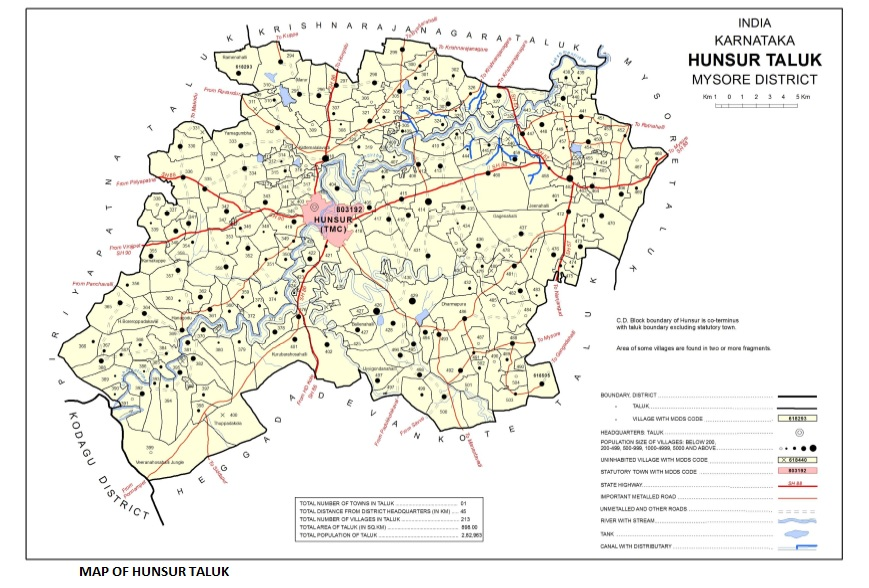
Hunsur Taluk Map

Hunsur is a city in Mysore district in the Indian state of Karnataka. It is the headquarters of the Hunsur Taluk administrative division.

== Geography ==
Hunsur is located at 12.31°N 76.29°E. It is located at an elevation of 805 metres (2,641 ft) above mean sea level. The river Lakshmana Tirtha flows through the town and two bridges are built across the river. The town is the administrative center of Hunsur taluk, which is part of the Mysore District.

Hunsur is situated on NH-275, connecting it to metropolitan cities of Mysuru, Bengaluru and Mangaluru. It is 45 km from Mysuru, and 175 km from Bengaluru. Other major highways passing through Hunsur are SH-88, SH-86 and SH-90.

== People ==
- D. Devaraj Urs, former Chief Minister of Karnataka
- Hunsur Krishnamurthy, director in Kannada Film Industry
- Kemparaj Urs, actor, producer, director
- Dwarkish, Kannada actor, director and producer .

== See also ==
- Saligrama, Mysore
