= Irupu Falls =

Waterfall in Karnataka, India

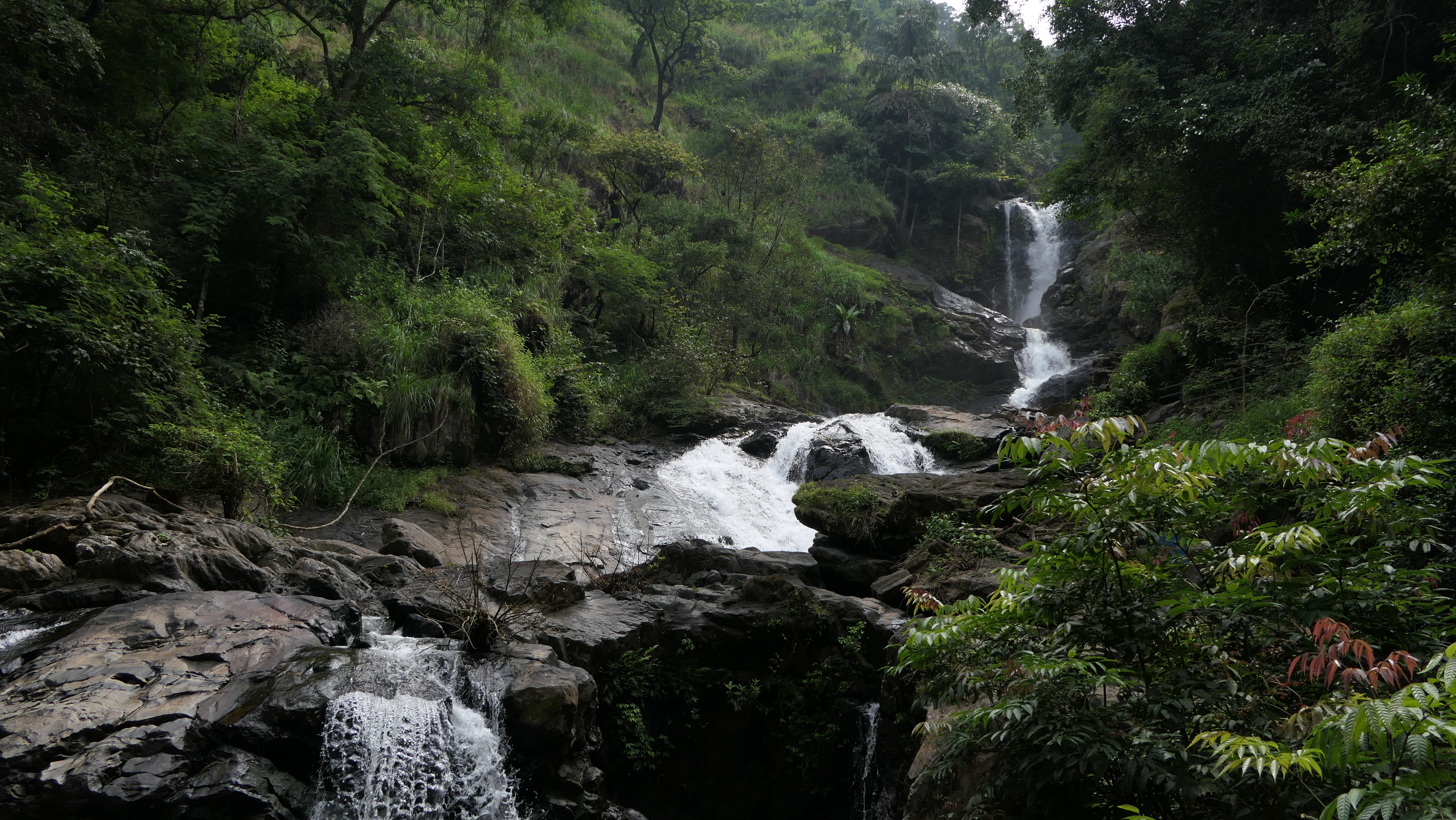
- Interactive map of Irupu Falls
- Location: Kurchi, Kodagu District, Karnataka, India
- Coordinates: 11°58′2.22″N 75°59′1.56″E
- Total height: 170 ft (52 m)
- Number of drops: 2
- Watercourse: Lakshmana Tirtha River

The Irupu Falls (also Iruppu Falls) are located in the Brahmagiri Range in the Kodagu district of Karnataka, India, bordering the Wayanad district of Kerala. It is a fresh water cascade and is situated at a distance of 48 km from Virajpet on the highway to Nagarhole. The falls are also known as the Lakshmana Tirtha Falls, derived from the name of the tributary of Cauvery which starts from these falls, the Lakshmana Tirtha River.

A forest trail leads from the falls to the Brahmagiri Peak in Southern Kodagu. Irupu Falls is a major tourist attraction as well as a pilgrimage spot. A famous Shiva temple, the Rameshwara Temple is situated on the banks of the Lakshmana Tirtha River, en route to the Falls. This temple attracts many pilgrims during the festival of Shivaratri.

== The legend ==
According to popular legend, Rama and Lakshmana, passed along the Bhramagiri range whilst searching for Rama's beloved, Sita. When Rama asked Lakshmana to fetch him drinking water, Lakshmana shot an arrow into the Brahmagiri hills and brought into being the river Lakshmana Tirtha. Due to this legend, the falls is believed to possess the power to cleanse sins and is visited by thousands of devotees on Shivaratri day.

== How to reach ==
Irupu is situated 48 km from Virajpet, 260 km from Bangalore, 240 km from Mangalore and 120 km from Mysore. The falls can be visited by the highway from Gonikopal to Nagerhole National Park off the Kutta Road after Srimangala.

=== By air ===
The nearest airport is the Kannur International Airport (101 KM) through the Western Ghats. Mysore Airport (113 KM) may also be used to reach the falls.

== Gallery ==
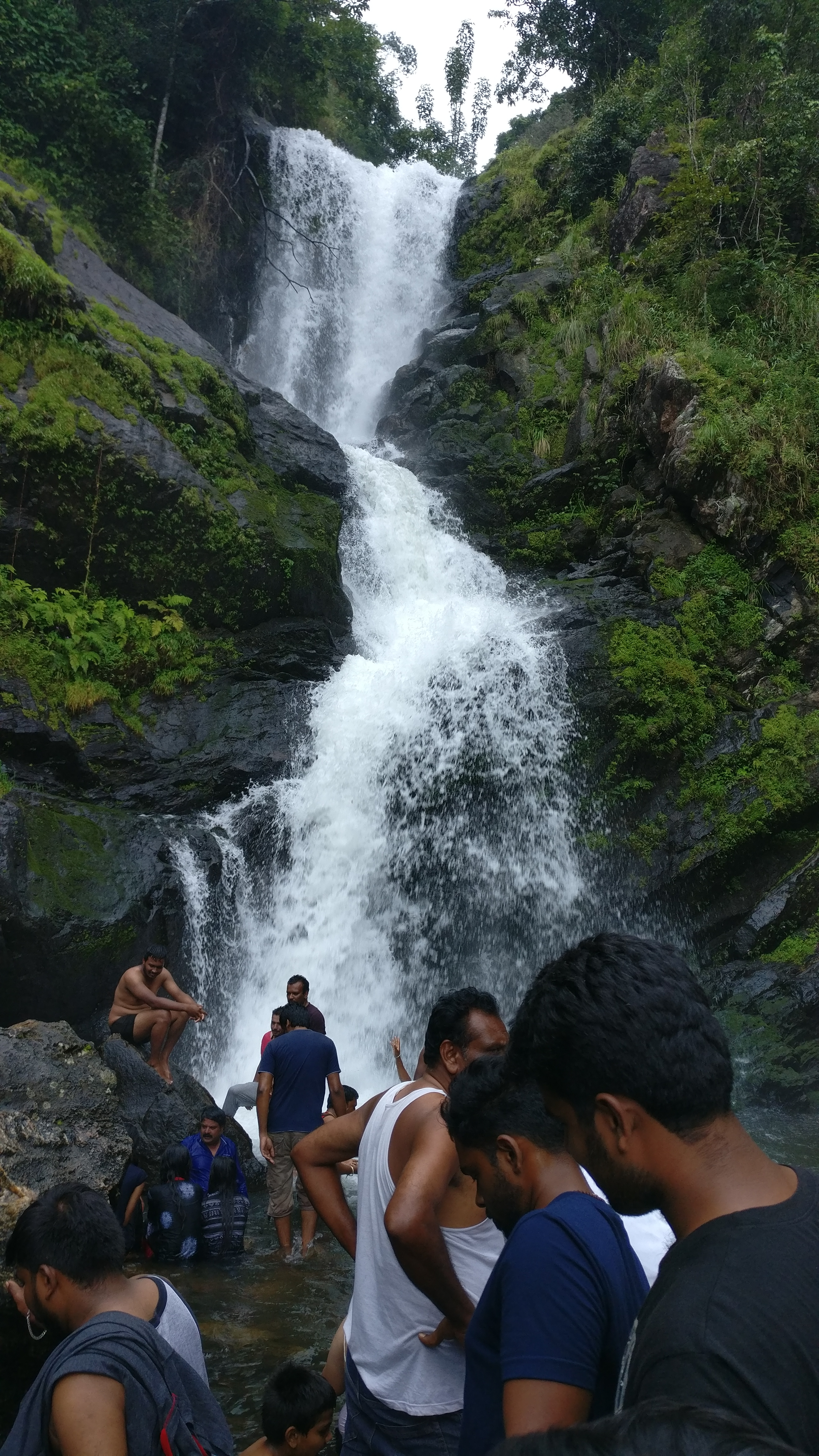
With visitors

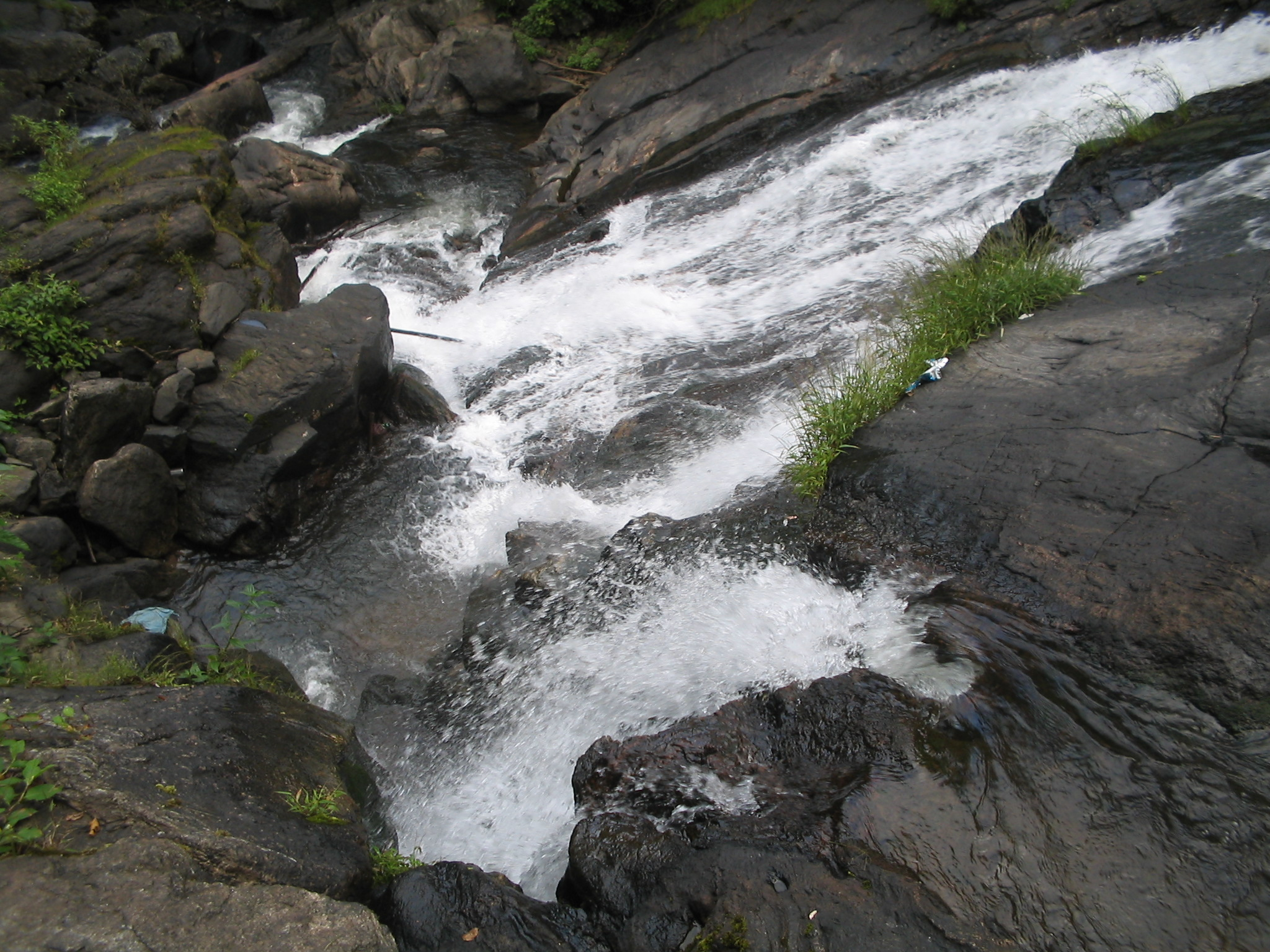
Taken from near the top

== Other places of interest ==
- Abbey Falls
- Jog Falls

== See also ==
- List of waterfalls
- List of waterfalls in India
