= Appayya =

Appayya or Appaiah is an Indian name, and may refer to:

- Appaya (film), a Kannada romance film written, directed and co-produced by S. Narayan
- Appayya Dikshita, an expositor and practitioner of the Advaita Vedanta school of Hindu philosophy
- Appayya Swamigalu, a Guru and Sanyasi from Kodagu
