= SAI Sanctuary =

- Village
- Location within Karnataka
- Coordinates: 11°58′5.54″N 75°52′57.58″E
- Country: India
- State: Karnataka
- District: Kodagu district

Government
  - Type: Panchayat raj
  - Body: Gram panchayat

Languages
  - Official: Kannada
- Time zone: UTC+5:30 (IST)
- PIN: 571249
- ISO 3166 code: IN-KA
- Vehicle registration: KA
- Website: http://www.saisanctuary.com/cont.htm

SAI (Save Animals Initiative) Sanctuary is located in the Kodagu district in the Indian state of Karnataka. SAI Sanctuary is the only private sanctuary in India. It is a small sanctuary, spread over an area of 1.2 square km. It is managed by SAI Sanctuary Trust, which won the Wildlife and Tourism Initiative of the Year Award-2014 for Eco-Tourism that protects forests and wildlife.

== History ==
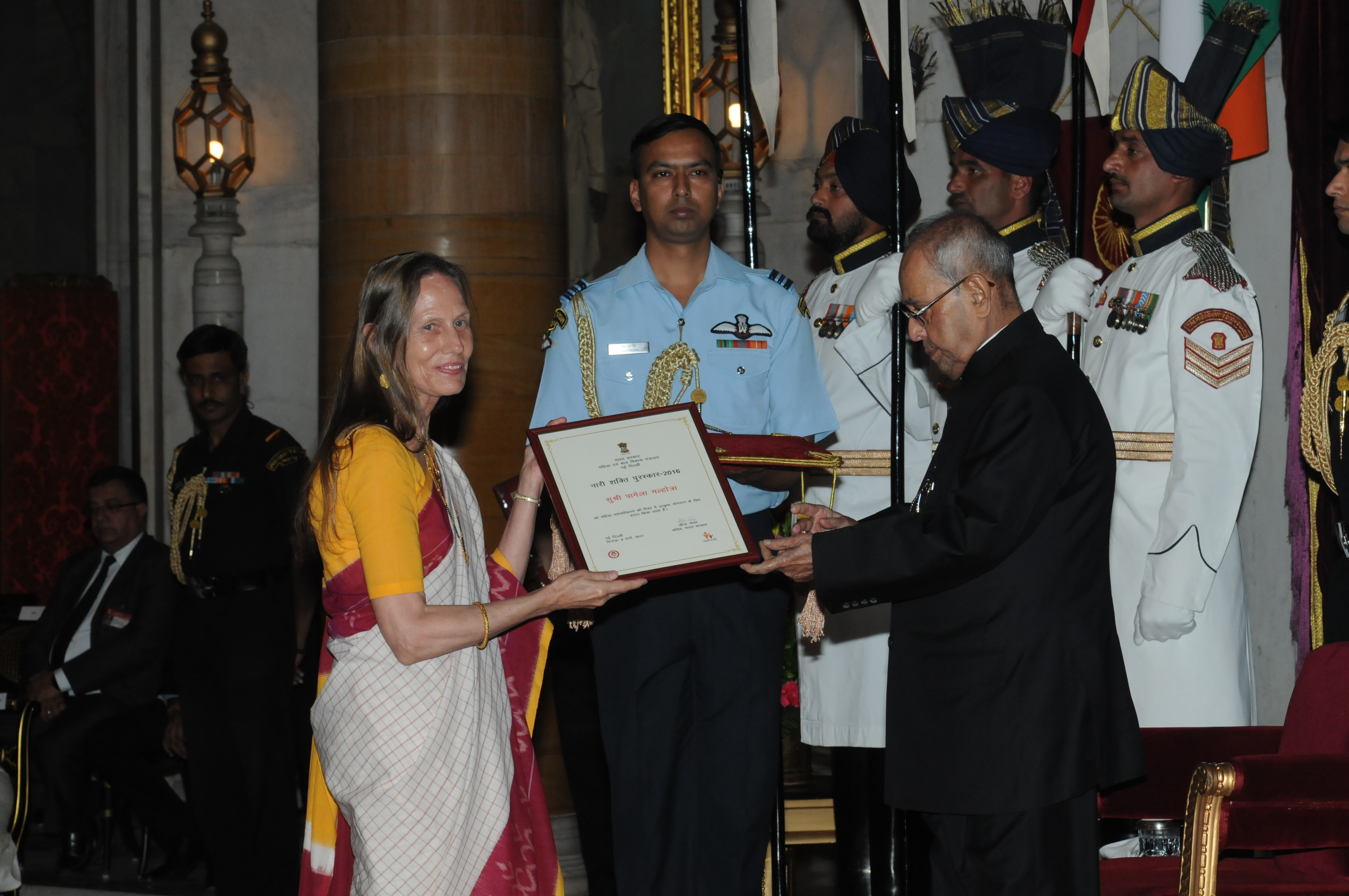
Pamela Gale Malhotra receiving the Nari Shakti Puraskar in 2017

Dr. Anil Kumar Malhotra and Pamela Malhotra who first went to the Himalayas, were only allowed to buy 12 acres so they came south to start the SAI (Save Animals Initiative) Sanctuary Trust. They bought around 55 acres of unused and abandoned land from the farmers who were not using it due to excess of rainfall in Kodagu district of Karnataka. They kept buying lands from farmers who were not using them. The land was used and farmers got money to repay their debts as their land was idle. Gradually the 55 acre forest cover became larger and today covers 300 acres of the land. There were a lot of native trees there. The couple decided to retain those and follow three rules: no chopping down trees, no human interference and no poachers.

The wildlife sanctuary started in 1991. After 23 years, they had transformed the 55 acres of barren land they bought in 1991 into a 300-acre sanctuary with a river that is home to fish and snakes, including the King Cobra. The huge trees and thick forest helped several birds like the hornbill find their homes. There are over 300 species of birds that visit this sanctuary. Several cameras are installed across the sanctuary to identify new animals and keep a track on poachers.

When the Malhotra couple purchased the land, there were already native species of cardamom and other trees that were planted. They planted more native trees around these. As the tree cover expanded, the animal and bird species increased. The flora includes hundreds of varieties of indigenous trees.

The couple grow 10-12 acres of coffee and around 15 acres of cardamom. They are involved in organic farming. The sanctuary is off-grid and it runs completely on solar and alternate energy. It is a registered not-for-profit trust which runs on donations which get tax exemptions.

As the area is very large it is hard to keep track of the poachers. To counter this, they spread awareness about preserving wildlife and nature in schools and nearby villages. The wildlife on their sanctuary includes Bengal tigers, Asian elephants, wild boar, leopards, sambhar and the giant Malabar squirrel.

On International Women's Day in 2017, she was in New Delhi where she was awarded the Nari Shakti Puraskar by President Pranab Mukherjee at the Rashtrapati Bhavan.
