= Tadiandamol =

Mountain in Karnataka, India

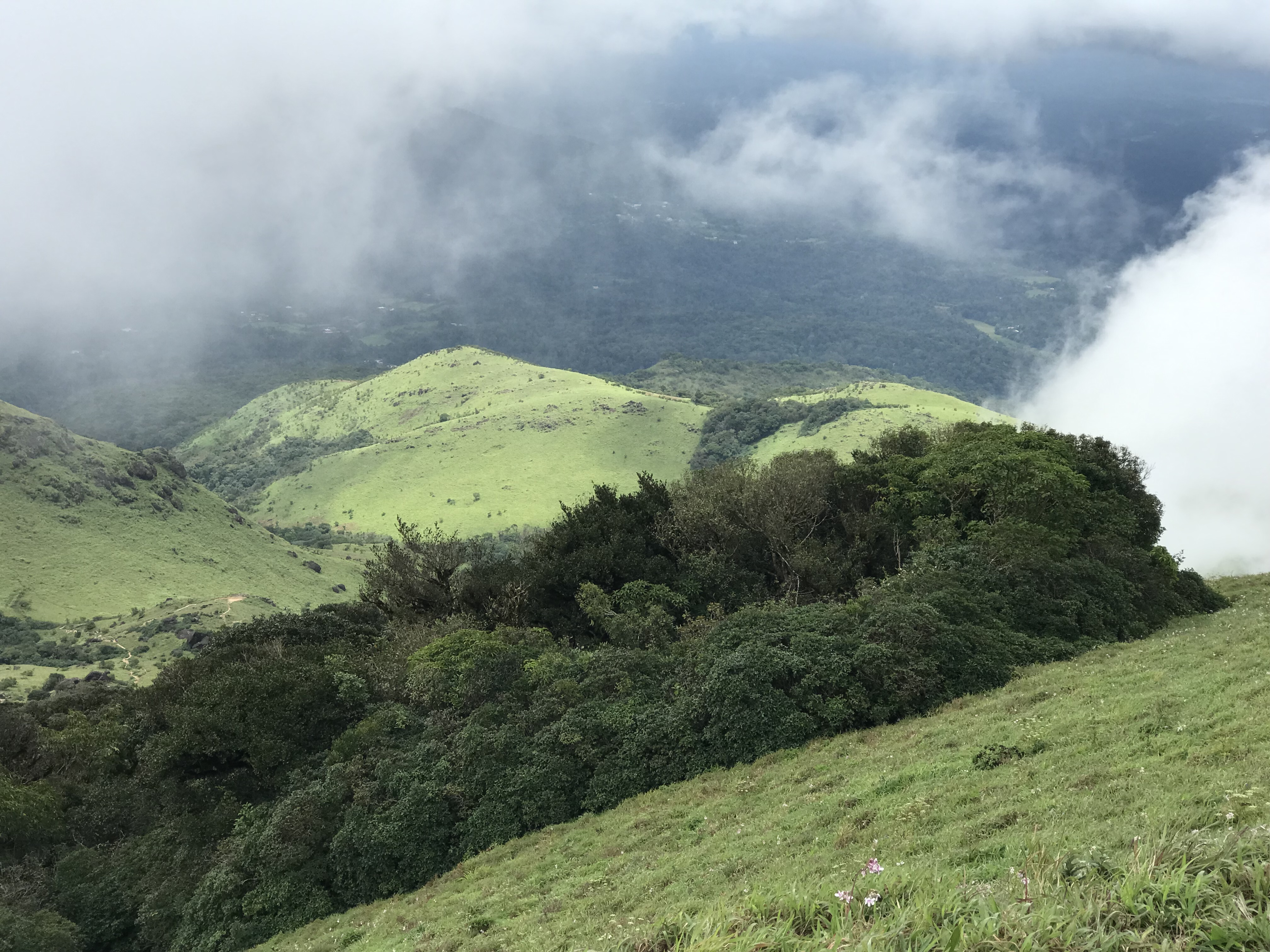
- Sholas grassland viewed from Tadiandamol peak

Highest point
- Elevation: 1,748 m (5,735 ft)
- Coordinates: 12°13′3.2308″N 75°36′31.7340″E

Geography
- Location within Karnataka Location within India
- Location: Madikeri Taluk, Kodagu District, Karnataka, India
- Parent range: Western Ghats

Climbing
- Easiest route: Hike

Tadiandamol or Thadiyandamol is the highest mountain of Madikeri taluk Kodagu district, Karnataka, India. It is the third highest peak in Karnataka, after Mullayyanagiri & Kudremukha. It is located Western Ghats range, and reaches an elevation of 1,748 m. The mountain has patches of shola forests in the valleys.

The Nalaknad (also known as Nalnad – meaning 4 villages) palace at the foothills is an important historical landmark.

It is a place of interest for trekkers and naturalists. The climb to the top and back can be completed as a day hike(within 5hrs) and the entry is closed at 5:00 pm; camping is banned since December 2016.The best time to visit the peak is July-end to September(after monsoon) as greenery is observed well in these months.

== Etymology ==
The name Tadiandamol literally means largest base (thadi = broad, large, huge; anda = belonging to (possessive) in Kodava; mol = hill, base, peak). It loosely means Tallest Mount, and the name also could translate as Broad Hill.

== Gallery ==
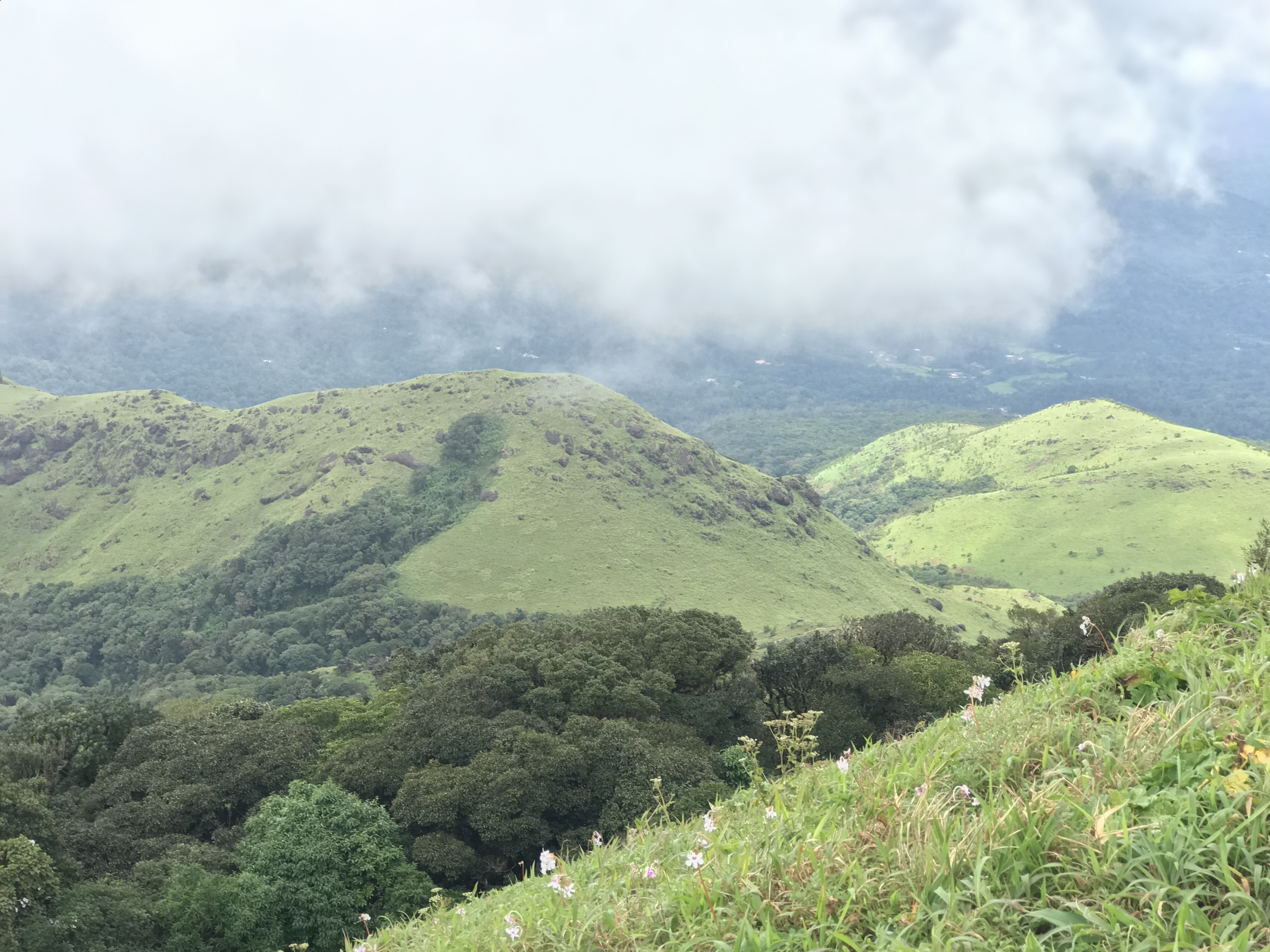
View from Tadiandamol Peak during august end

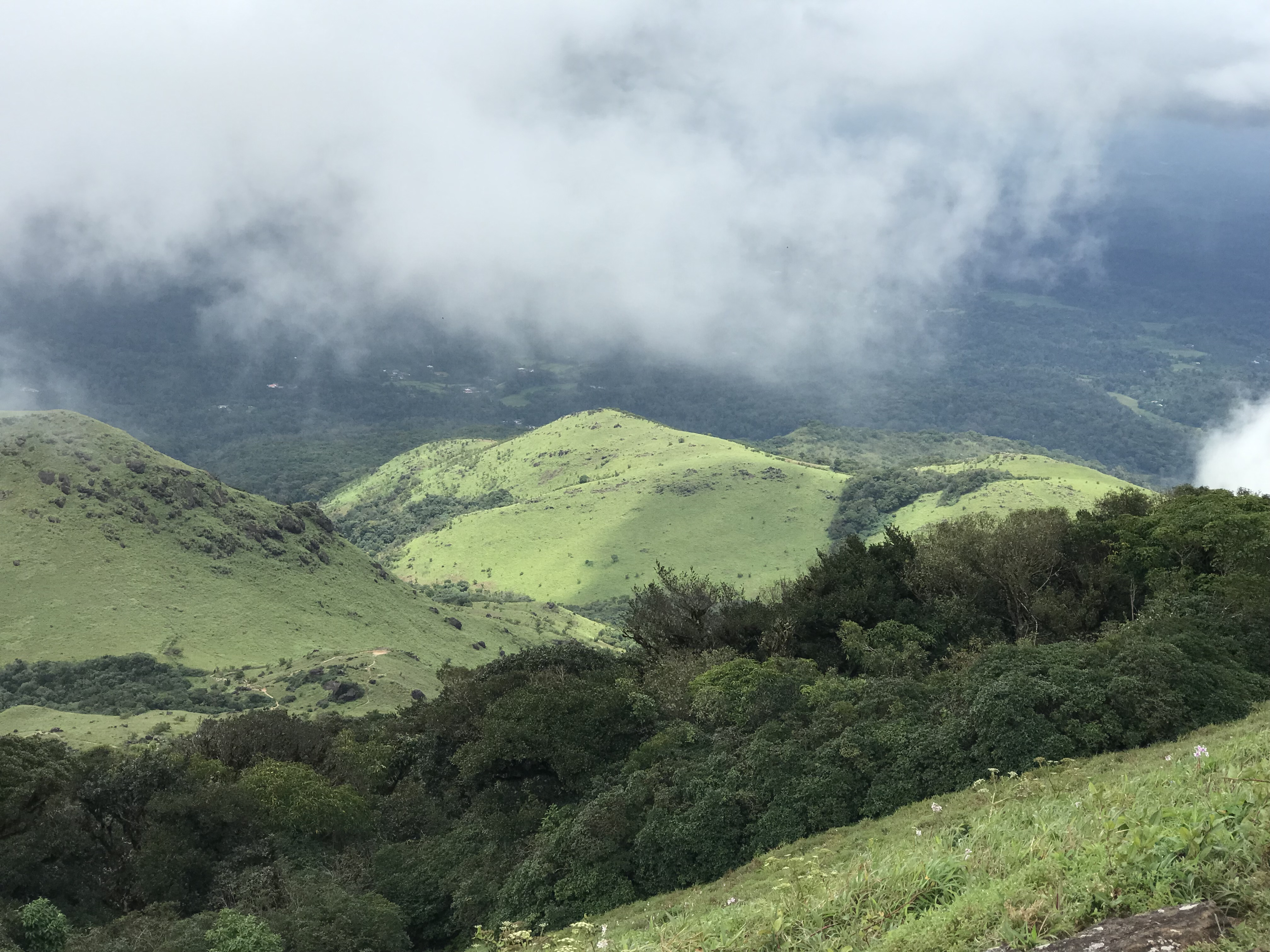
View from Tadiandamol Peak

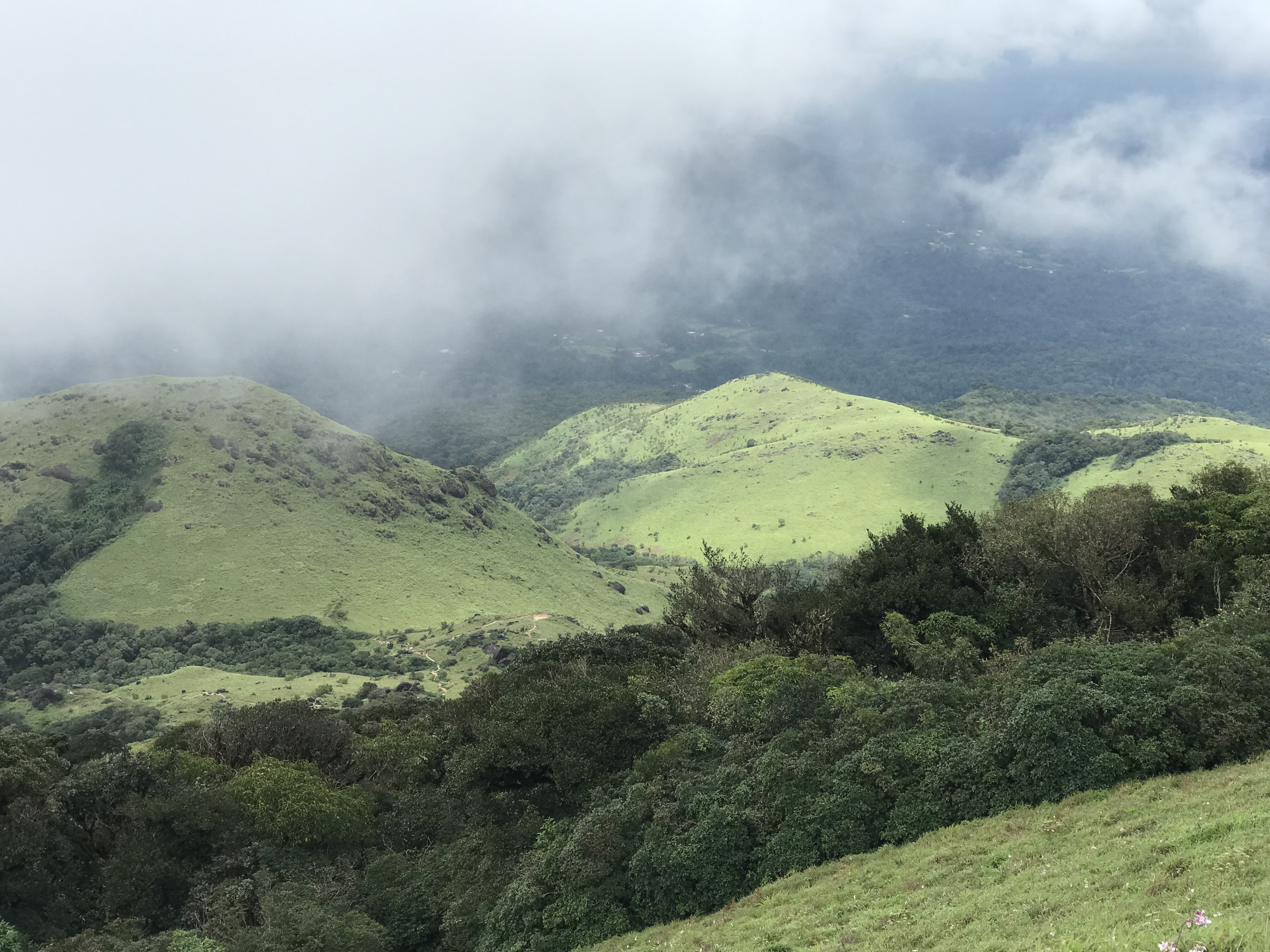
Greenery seen from Tadiandamol Peak

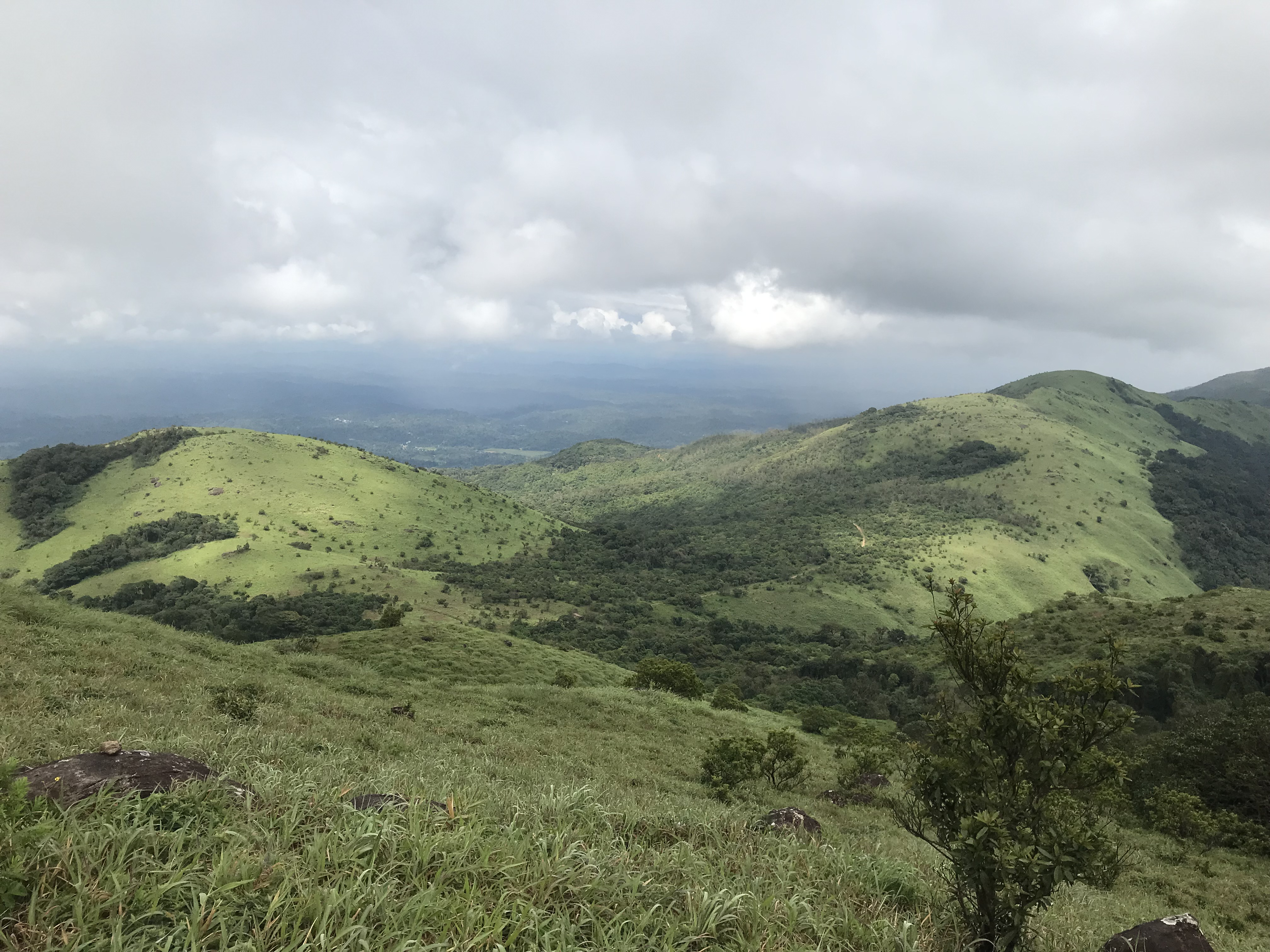
View From Second Topmost hill during Tadiandamol trekking

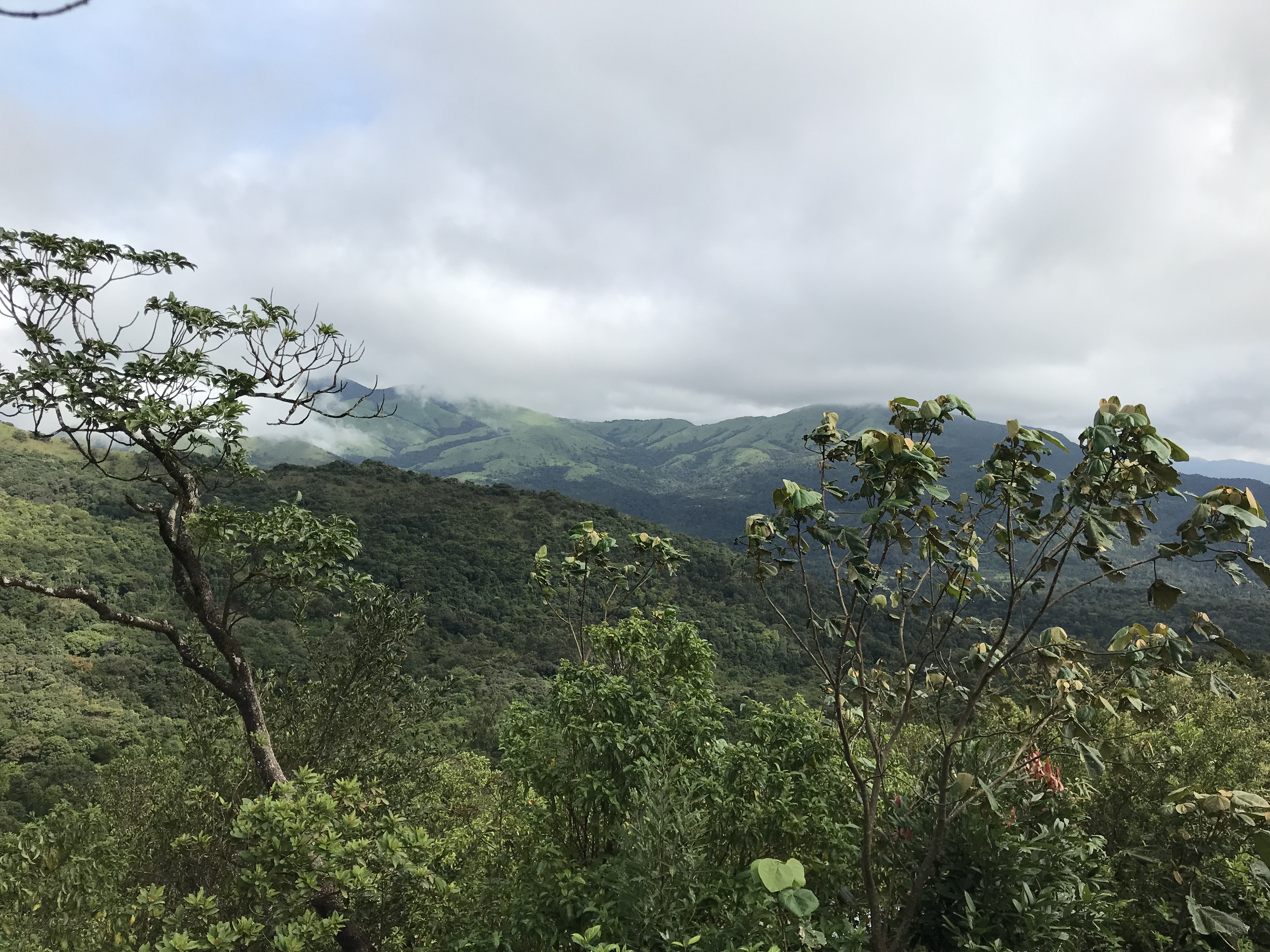
checkpost and starting point of Tadiandamol Trek

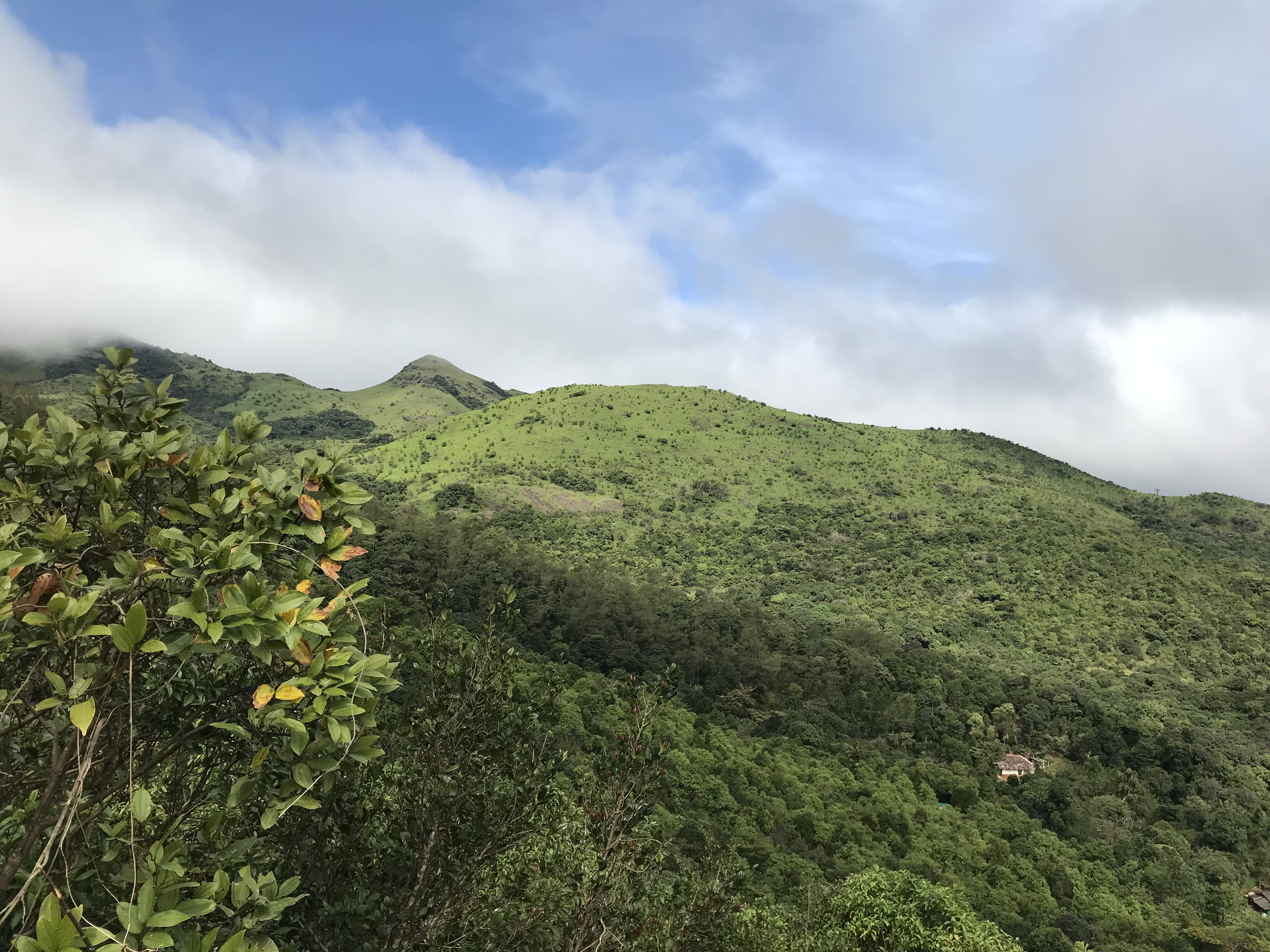
checkpost and starting point of Tadiandamol Trek pic 2

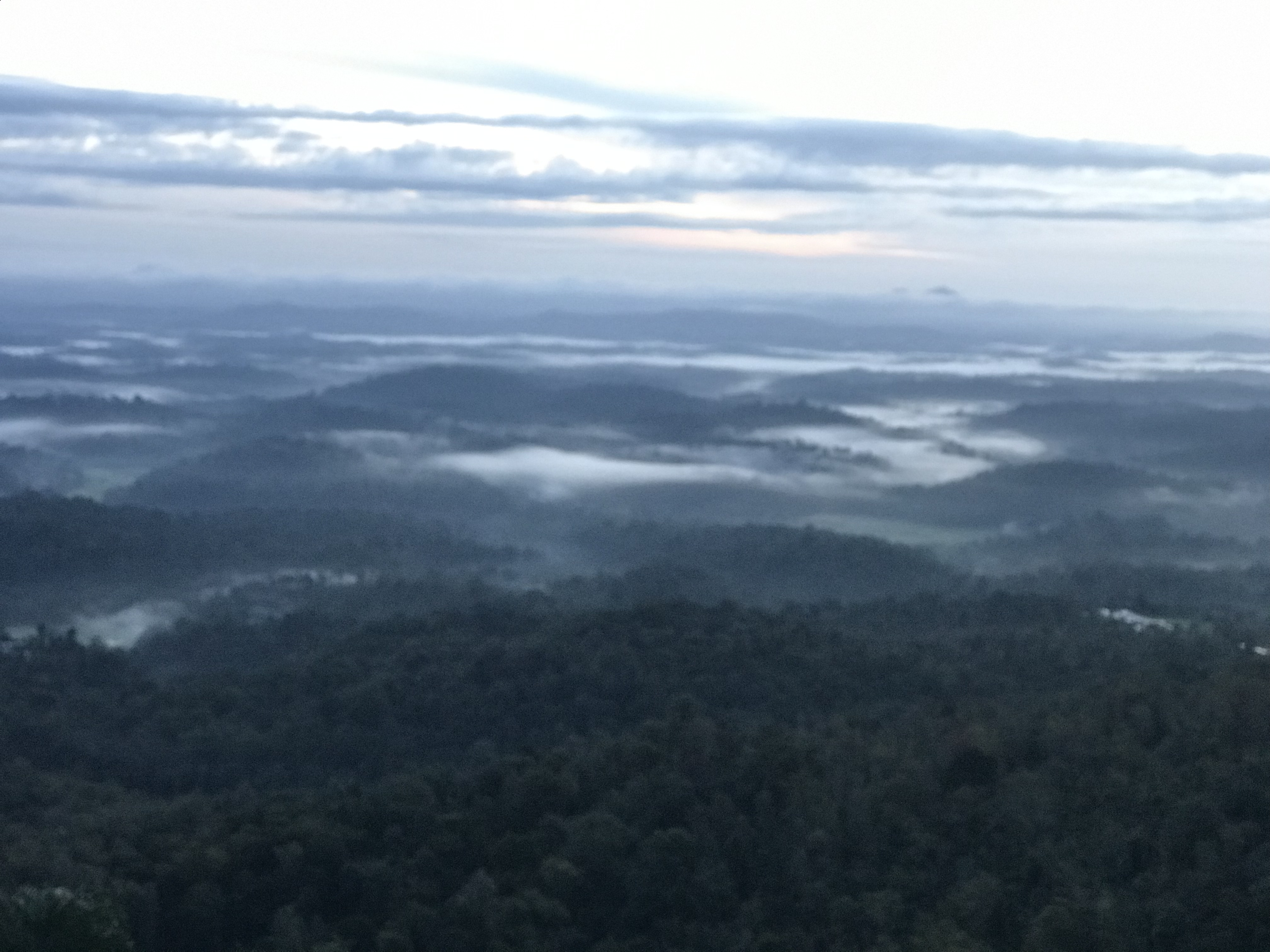
Tadiandamol Trekking starting point view from Resort

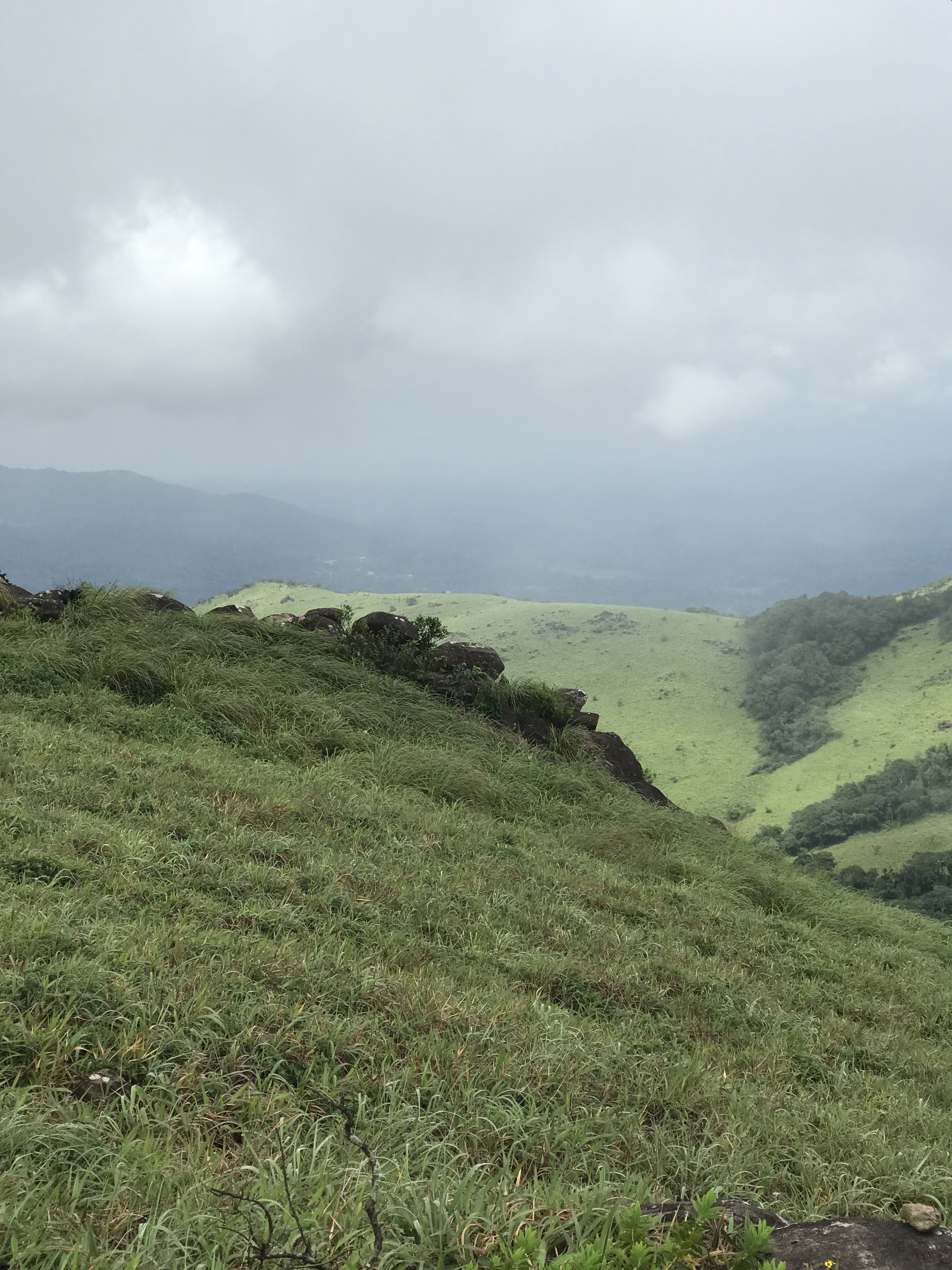
Tadiandamol Trek View from 2nd viewpoint

== See also ==
- Virajpet
- Madikeri
- Mangalore
- Bhagamandala
