= Lakshmana Tirtha =

Location
- Country: India
- States: Karnataka
- Region: Southern India
- Origin: Kodagu, Karnataka

Physical characteristics
- Source: Brahmagiri Wildlife Sanctuary, Kodagu, Western Ghats, Karnataka
  - location: Karnataka, India
  - coordinates: 11°57′50″N 75°58′10″E
  - elevation: 1,450 metres (4,760 ft)
- Mouth: Kaveri
  - location: Sagarakatte
  - coordinates: 12°24′43″N 76°28′03″E
  - elevation: 770 metres (2,530 ft)
- Length: 149 km (93 mi)

The Lakshmana Tirtha (Lakshmantīrtha River) is a river of Karnataka, India. It rises in Kodagu district and flows eastward. It joins the Kaveri in the Krishna Raja Sagara reservoir.

The river originates at the height of 1450 meters in the Brahmagiri range of Kodagu district. Unlike Kaveri, Lakshmana Tirtha flows in a relatively flat-terrain region of South Kodagu. An increase in the water level during monsoon, results in flooding of adjacent paddy fields. The river meanders throughout its course and enters Mysore district through Nagarahole National Park. Hunsur is located on the banks of this river and is the source of drinking water for the people of Hunsur. The river finally meets Kaveri at Krishna Raja Sagara reservoir at an elevation of 750 meters above MSL, after traversing a length of about 148.82 kilometers.

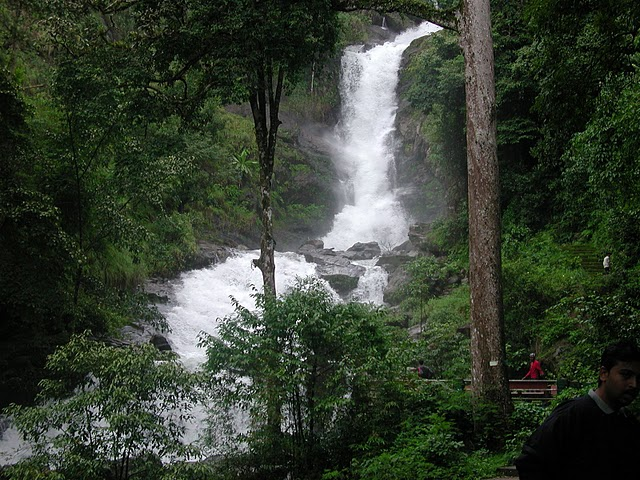
Iruppu falls on the river course

== Threats ==
- The river generally runs dry a few months after the monsoons due to groundwater depletion, constant exposure to direct sunlight, and the lack of shade from the coffee estates, a privilege that Kaveri enjoys during its course in Kodagu.
- Pollution of its tributaries is a major concern. Waste is dumped into steams of Kuranthoad flowing near Ponnampet and Gonikoppal. Coffee wastewater from de-pulping coffee cherries is also a serious threat to the river.
- Untreated waste from Hunsur, is led directly into this river.
- Illegal sand mining has been a major headache for the district administration.
