= Kodagu district =

Kodagu district Coorg district, Kodava Naad (Kodava language)
- District of Karnataka
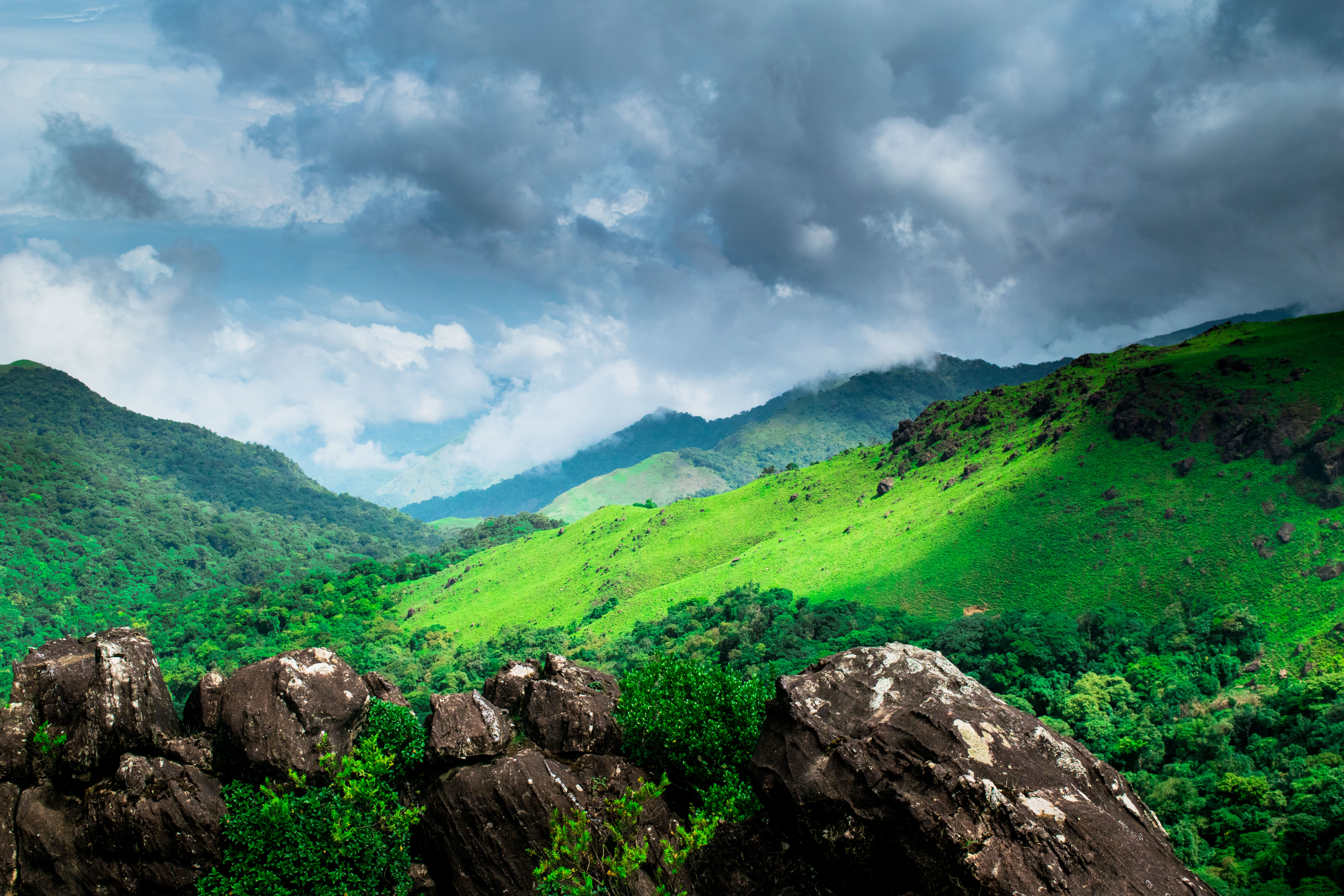
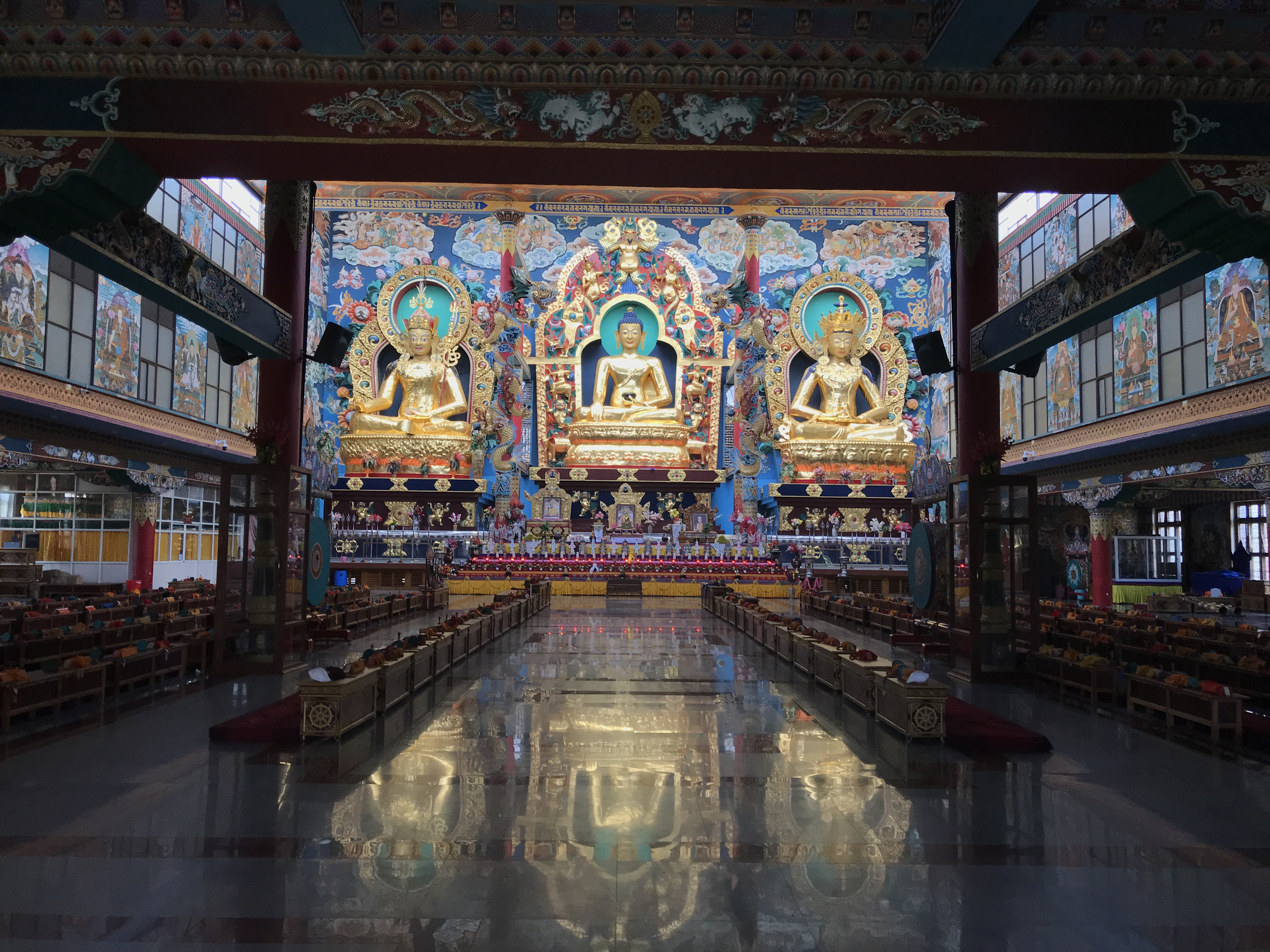
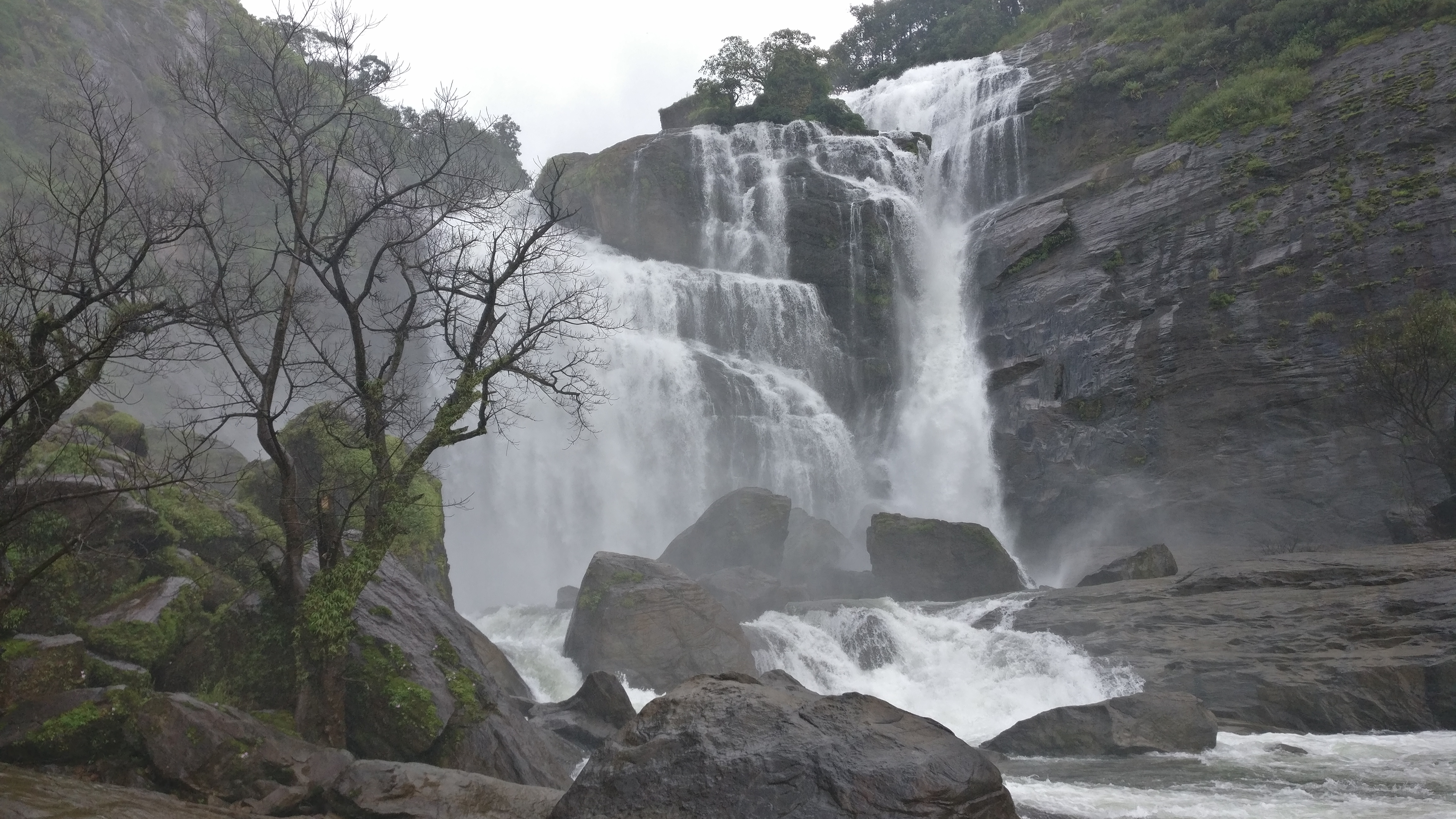
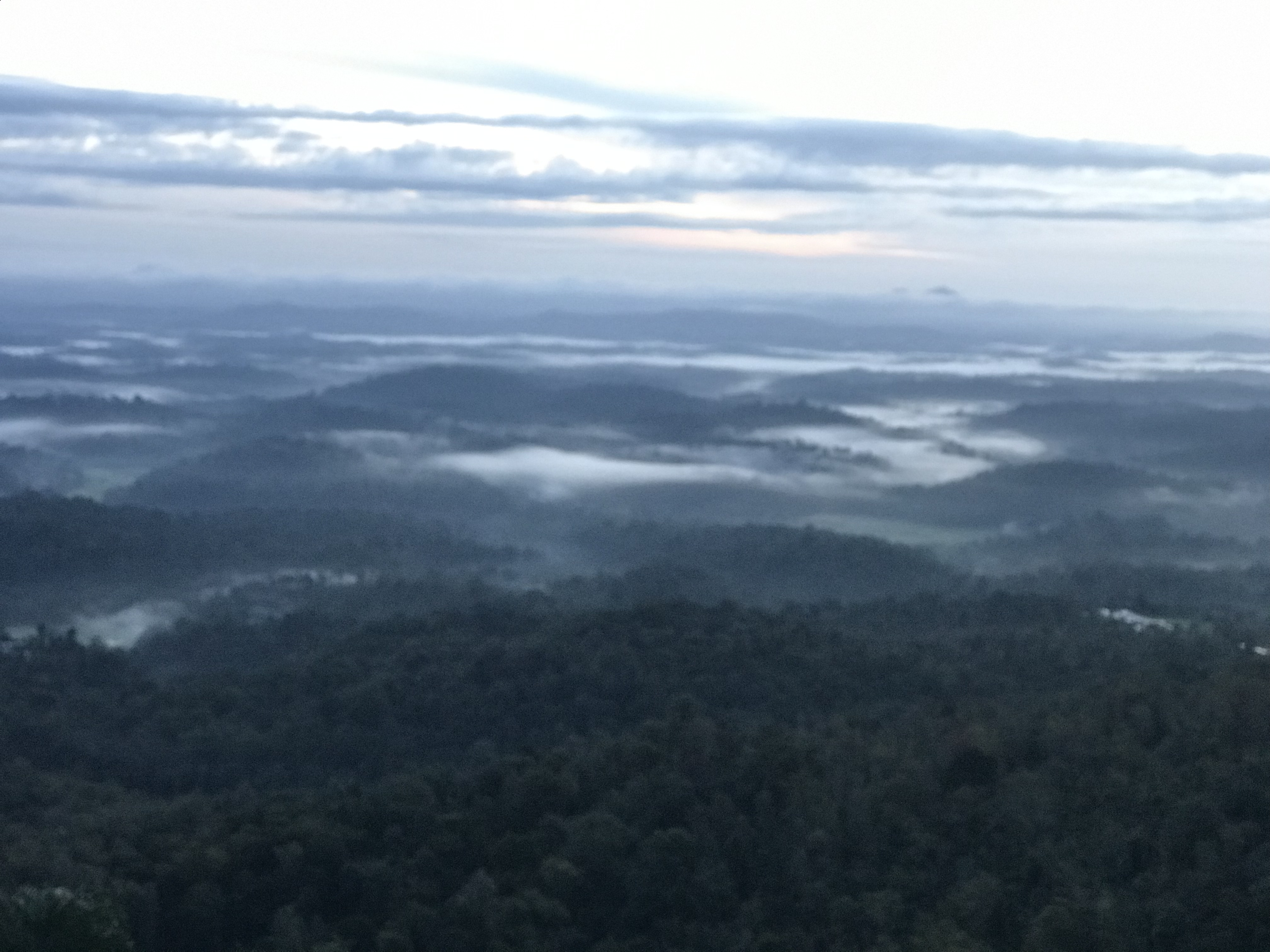
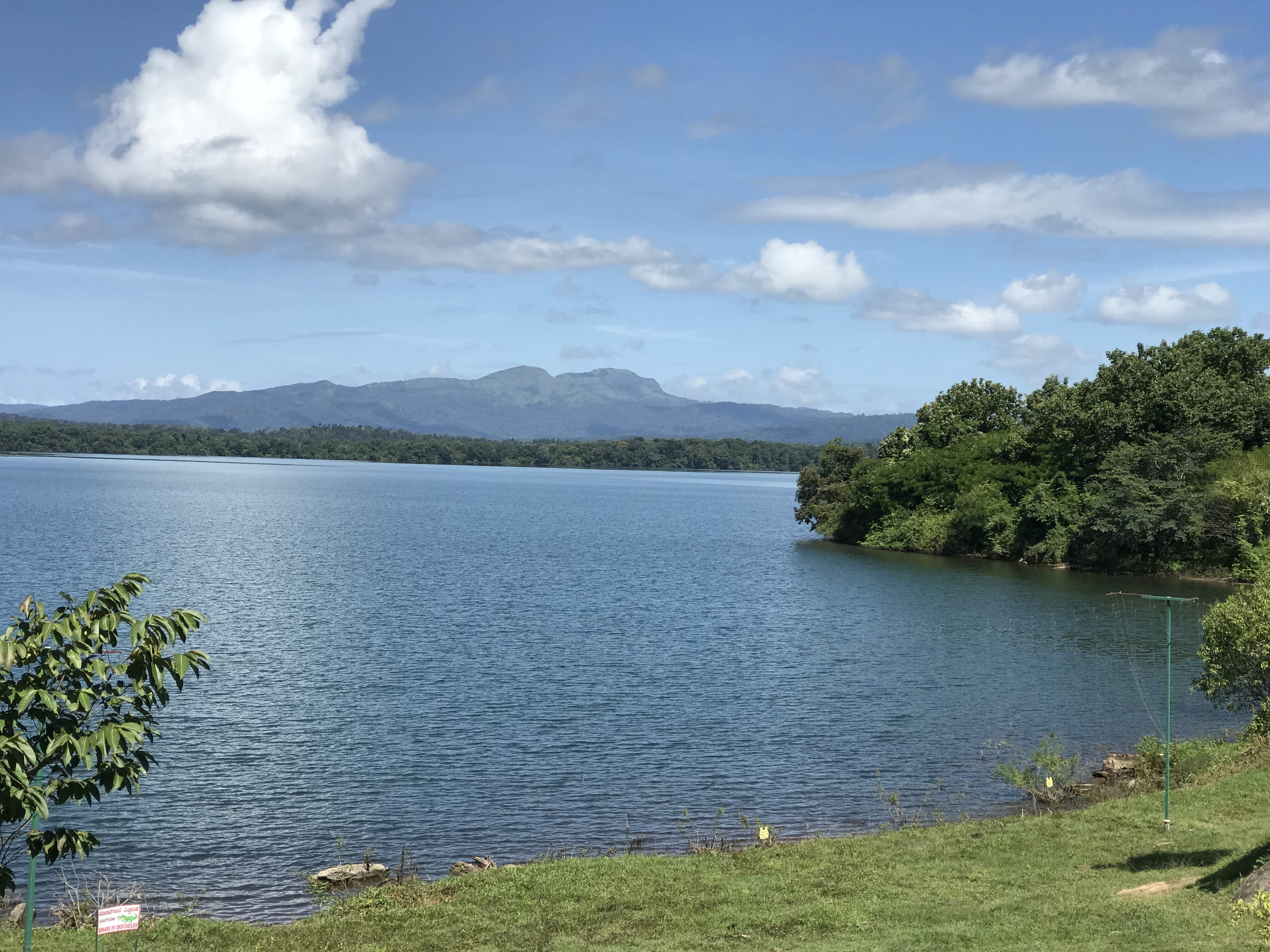
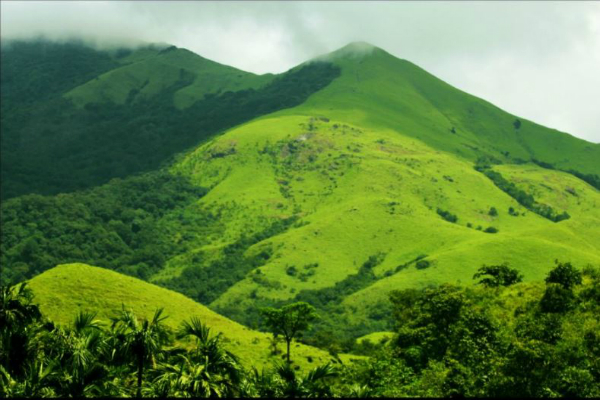
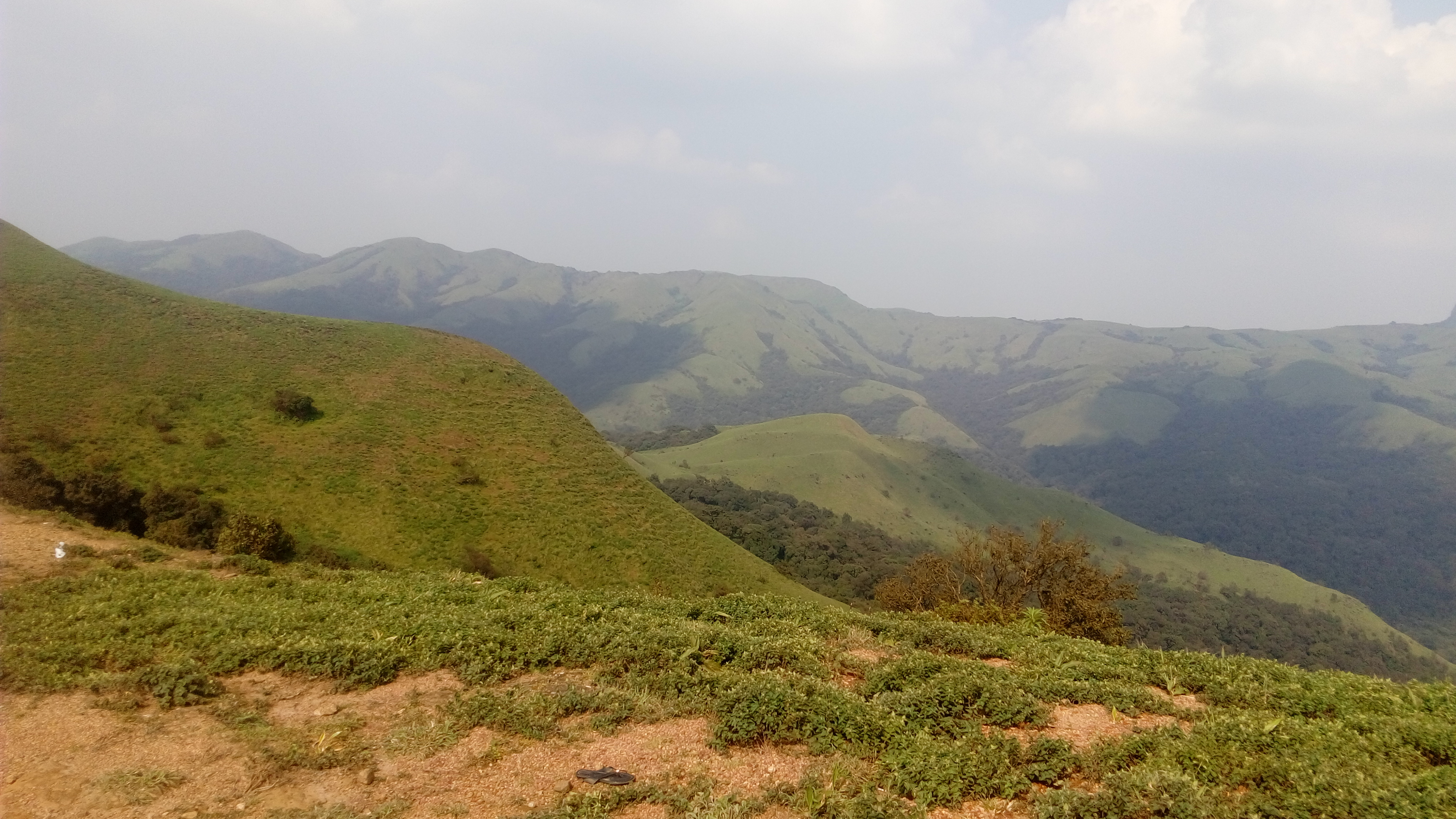
- Clockwise from top-left: Tadiandamol, Tibetian Golden Temple, Resort view from Tadiandamol, Shola grassland in Kumara Parvatha, Harangi Elephant Camp & Tree Park and Mallalli Falls, Mandalpatti hill an 18km roadway from Medikeri
- Nicknames: The Land of Warriors, The Coffee Cup of India
- Location in Karnataka
- Coordinates: 12.4208°N 75.7397°E
- Country: India
- State: Karnataka
- Division: Mysuru
- Region: Malenadu
- Haleri Dynasty: early 17th century
- Coorg Province: May 1834
- Coorg State: 15 August 1947
- Kodagu district: 1 November 1956
- Headquarters: Madikeri
- Talukas: Madikeri, Virajpet, Somwarpet, Ponnampet, Kushalanagar

Government
  - Deputy Commissioner: Somashekar S J (IAS)
  - MP: Yaduveer Wadiyar
  - MLA: Mantar Gowda (Madikeri); A. S. Ponnanna (Virajpet)
  - Superintendent of Police (SP): Bindu Mani R N (IPS)

Area
  - Total: 4,102 km^{2} (1,584 sq mi)
  - Rank: 26^{th}(out of 31 districts)
- Elevation (Avg. of 5 taluks): 984 m (3,228 ft)

Population (2011)
  - Total: 554,519
  - Rank: 31^{st}(out of 31 districts)
  - Density: 135.2/km^{2} (350.1/sq mi)
- Demonym(s): Kodava, Kodagaru, Coorgi

Languages
  - Official: Kannada
- Time zone: UTC+5:30 (IST)
- PIN: 571201 (Madikeri)
- Telephone code: + 91 (0) 8272 (Madikeri); +91 (0) 8274 (Virajpet); + 91 (0) 8276 (Somwarpet)
- Vehicle registration: KA-12
- Literacy: 82.52%
- Lok Sabha: Mysore Lok Sabha constituency
- Karnataka Legislative Assembly constituency: Madikeri, Virajpet
- Climate: Tropical Wet (Köppen)
- Precipitation: 2,725.5 millimetres (107.30 in)
- Avg. summer temperature: 28.6 °C (83.5 °F)
- Avg. winter temperature: 14.2 °C (57.6 °F)
- Website: kodagu.nic.in

- Person: Koḍavanï
- People: Koḍavarï
- Language: Koḍava takkï
- Country: Koḍagï

Kodagu district (Kodava: [koɖɐɡɨ, -ʋɨ], also known by its former name Coorg, Kodava: koḍagï, koḍavï) is an administrative district in the Karnataka state of India. Before 1956, it was an administratively separate Coorg State at which point it was merged into an enlarged Mysore State.

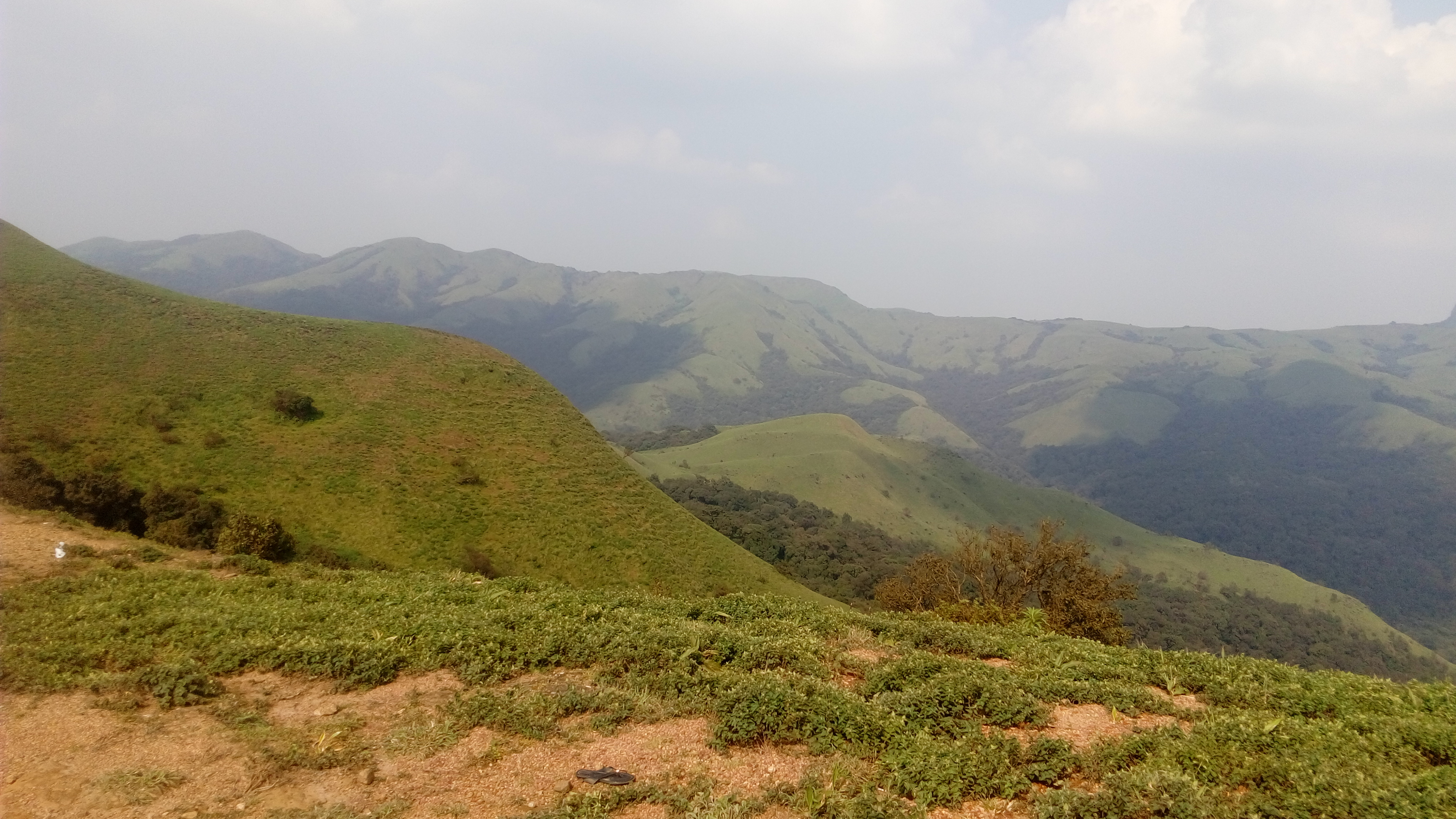
Mandalpatti Peak near Madikeri can be reached using road

== Etymology ==
Derived from √koḍa "western", -gï "place".

== Geography ==
Kodagu is located on the eastern slopes of the Western Ghats. It has a geographical area of 4,102 km^{2} (1,584 sq mi). The district is bordered by Dakshina Kannada district to the northwest, Hassan district to the north, Mysore district to the east, Kasaragod district of Kerala in west and Kannur district of Kerala to the southwest, and Wayanad district of Kerala to the south. It is a hilly district, the lowest elevation being 50 metres (160 ft) above sea-level near makutta. The highest peak, Tadiandamol, rises to 1,750 metres (5,740 ft), with Pushpagiri, the second highest, at 1,715 metres (5,627 ft). The main river in Kodagu is the Kaveri (Cauvery), which originates at Talakaveri, located on the eastern side of the Western Ghats, and with its tributaries, drains the greater part of Kodagu.

=== Rivers (mouth) ===
- Kaveri (Bay of Bengal)
- Payaswini (Arabian Sea)
- Tejaswini (Arabian Sea)
- Kuppam River (Arabian Sea)
- Valapattanam River (Arabian Sea)
- Harangi (Kaveri)
- Lakshmana Tirtha (Kaveri)
- Barapole (Valapattanam River)
- Kumaradhara (Netravathi River)
- Taraka (Kabini River)

=== Peaks ===
- Tadiyandamol
- Kumara Parvatha
- Brahmagiri

== Rainfall ==
Kodagu district receives majority of its rainfall from Southwest Monsoon winds. Kodagu's annual rainfall average is 4^{th} highest in Karnataka. The amount of rainfall varies significantly due to the effects of El-nino and La-nina.

In the year 2018, Kodagu received 29% excess rainfall of 3,737 millimetres (147.1 in), 3,040 millimetres (120 in) in 2019, 2,541 millimetres (100.0 in) in 2020, and 2,656 millimetres (104.6 in) in 2021.

In the year 2022, Kodagu received 11% Above-Normal rainfall of 3,036 millimetres (119.5 in).

In the year 2023, it received 38% deficit rainfall of 1,690 millimetres (67 in).

In the year 2024, Kodagu on an average received 3,052.2 millimetres (120.17 in) of annual rainfall.

In the year 2025, Kodagu received, on an average 3,169 millimetres (124.8 in) of annual rainfall. Overall, it's (+16%) above normal, with overwhelming Pre-Monsoon showers. It received 750.2 millimetres (29.54 in) against the normal 250 millimeters(+197%) as Pre-monsoon-rains, its monsoon was a normal with 2,176 millimetres (85.7 in)(-1%), but the North-East Monsoon was (-16%) deficit, receiving only 243 millimetres (9.6 in) of rainfall.

== Forest ==
Kodagu has three wildlife sanctuaries; Pushpagiri Wildlife Sanctuary, Talakaveri Wildlife Sanctuary and Brahmagiri Wildlife Sanctuary, one National Park; the Nagarahole National Park and the only private sanctuary of India; the SAI Sanctuary.

== Agriculture ==
Economy of Kodagu is dependent on agriculture. Major crops grown here are Paddy, Coffee, Rubber, Pepper, Cardamom, Coorg Oranges and Honey production. Tea, Ginger and Cocoa are also grown in smaller quantities.

=== Coffee and pepper production ===
Kodagu is the largest coffee and pepper producing district in India. Karnataka produces nearly 70% of the total coffee production in India, out of which 33% is contributed by Kodagu district alone. Kodagu also produces nearly a quarter of India's black pepper.

== Representation ==
Two members of the legislative assembly are elected from Kodagu to the Karnataka Legislative Assembly, one each from the Madikeri and Virajpet. Dr. Mantar Gowda represents the Madikeri constituency while A.S Ponnanna represents the Virajpet constituency; they are from the Indian National Congress. Kodagu, formerly part of the Kodagu-Dakshina Kannada (Mangalore) constituency, is now part of the Mysore-Kodagu Lok Sabha constituency parliamentary constituency. The current MP for this constituency is Shri Yaduveer Krishnadatta Chamaraja Wadiyar, from the Bharatiya Janata Party.

The Codava National Council and Kodava Rashtriya Samiti are campaigning for autonomy to Kodagu district which would have made Coorg more prosperous and independent.

== History ==
Map of South Indian states prior to the States Reorganisation Act, 1956. Kodagu (then called Coorg) is in dark green.

The Kodavas were the earliest inhabitants and agriculturists in Kodagu, having lived there for centuries. Kodavas being a warrior community as well, they carried arms during times of war and had their own chieftains.

The earliest mention about Coorg can be seen in the works those date back to Sangam period (300 BCE - 300 CE). The Ezhimala dynasty had jurisdiction over two Nadus - The coastal Poozhinadu and the hilly eastern Karkanadu. According to the works of Sangam literature, Poozhinadu consisted much of the coastal belt between Mangalore and Kozhikode. Karkanadu consisted of Wayanad-Gudalur hilly region with parts of Kodagu (Coorg).

The Haleri dynasty, an offshoot of the Keladi Nayakas, ruled Kodagu between 1600 and 1834. Later the British ruled Kodagu from 1834, after the Coorg War, until India's independence in 1947. A separate state (called Coorg State) until then, in 1956 Kodagu was merged with the Mysore State (now Karnataka).

=== Coorg in British India ===
In 1834, the East India Company annexed Kodagu into British India, after deposing Chikka Virarajendra of the Kodagu kingdom, as 'Coorg'. British rule led to the establishment of educational institutions, introduction of scientific coffee cultivation, better administration and improvement of the economy. This reference notwithstanding - we should remember that the colonial rule by the British in India was about exploitation of resources and Kodagu provided a lot of scope for economic benefits to a colonising empire.

== Demographics ==
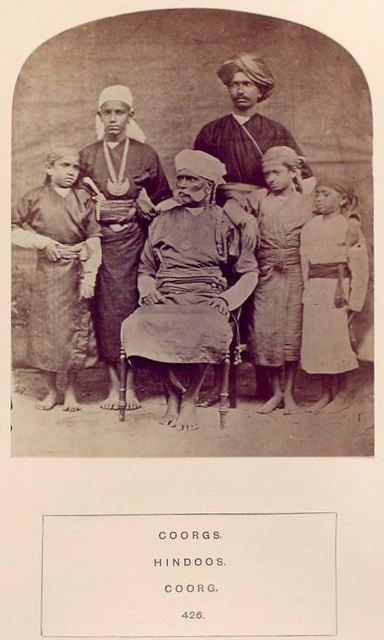
Kodavas, 1875, from: "The people of India: A series of photographic illustrations..." (New York Public Library).

Historical population
Year	Pop.	±% p.a.
1901	180,607	—
1911	174,976	−0.32%
1921	163,838	−0.66%
1931	163,327	−0.03%
1941	168,726	+0.33%
1951	229,405	+3.12%
1961	322,829	+3.48%
1971	378,291	+1.60%
1981	461,888	+2.02%
1991	488,455	+0.56%
2001	548,561	+1.17%
2011	554,519	+0.11%

According to the 2011 census of India, Kodagu has a population of 554,519, roughly equal to the Solomon Islands or the US state of Wyoming. This ranks it 539 out of 640 districts in India in terms of population. The district has a population density of 135 inhabitants per square kilometre (350/sq mi). Its population growth rate over the decade 2001–2011 was 1.13%. Kodagu has a sex ratio of 1019 females for every 1000 males, and a literacy rate of 82.52%. 14.61% of the population lives in urban areas. Scheduled Castes and Scheduled Tribes make up 13.27% and 10.47% of the population respectively.

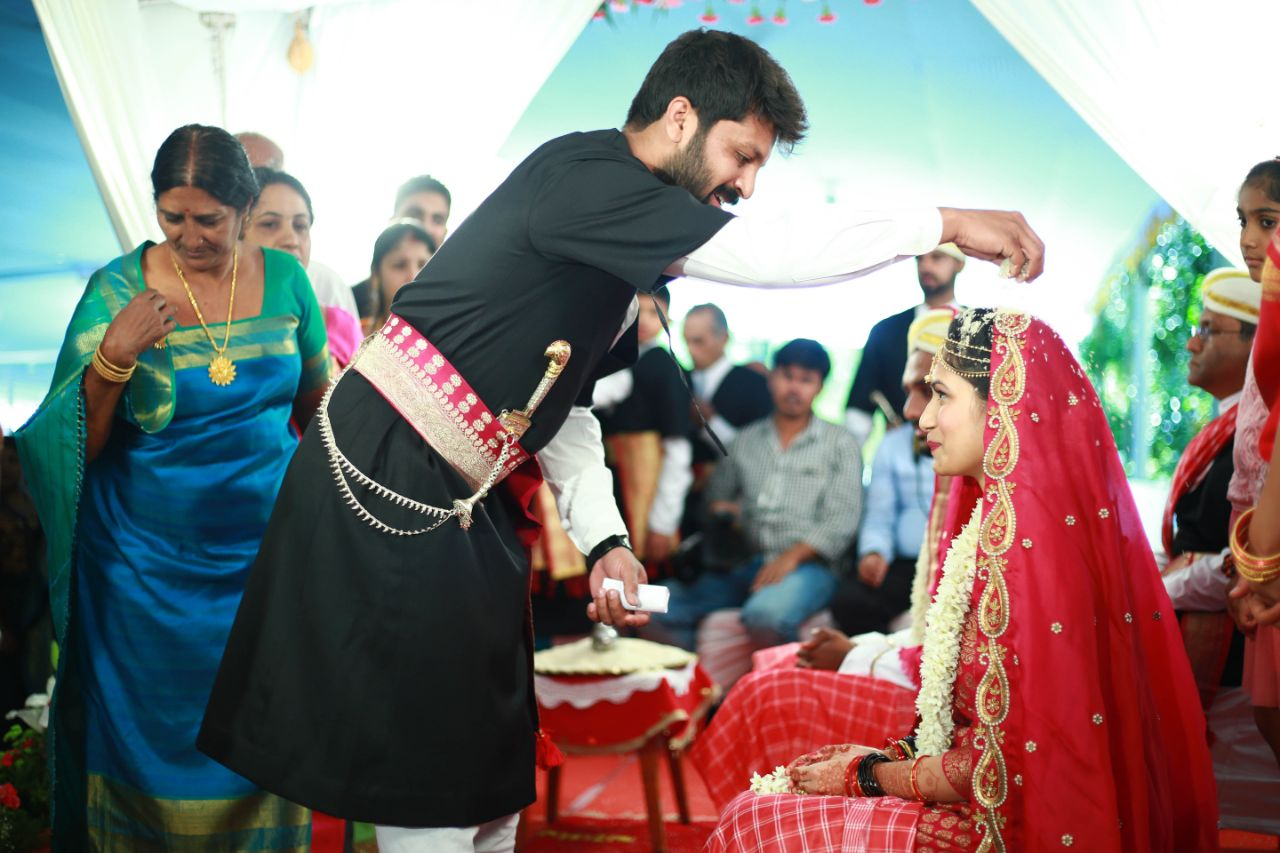
Kodava wedding

=== Religion ===
Religions in Kodagu district (2011)
Religion	Percent
Hinduism	80.97%
Islam	15.74%
Christianity	3.09%
Other or not stated	0.20%

Hindus are the vast majority. They include the Kodava people, other Kodava language speakers, Arebhashe Gowdas, Brahmins, most Yeravas and Kurubas. A huge minority of Muslims dot the Coorg district, especially the towns of Kushalnagar, Virajpet and Mercara. A sizeable of them are the Nawayaths who shifted in the eighties from Bhatkal and Murdeshwar in order to pursue coffee & arecanut plantations and textile business. The numerous mosque dotting the landscape is the testimony of Muslim presence in the district.

A small number of Mangalorean Catholics are also found in Coorg. They are mostly descended from those Konkani Catholics who fled the roundup and, later, captivity by Tippu Sultan. These immigrants were welcomed by Raja Veerarajendra (himself a former captive of Tippu Sultan, having escaped six years of captivity in 1788) who realising their usefulness and expertise as agriculturists, gave them lands and tax breaks and built a church for them.

=== Language ===
Languages of Kodagu district (2011)
1. Kannada (30.9%)
2. Malayalam (20.8%)
3. Kodava (14.9%)
4. Tulu (8.92%)
5. Are (5.81%)
6. Yerava (4.66%)
7. Tamil (4.23%)
8. Urdu (2.95%)
9. Kurumba (1.74%)
10. Telugu (1.55%)
11. Konkani (1.16%)
12. Others (2.38%)

At the time of the 2011 census, 30.91% of the population spoke Kannada, 20.83% Malayalam, 14.86% Kodava, 8.92% Tulu, 5.81% Are, 4.66% Yerava, 4.23% Tamil, 2.95% Urdu, 1.74% Kurumba, 1.55% Telugu and 1.16% Konkani as their first language.

Are Bhashe, a dialect of Kannada, Tulu and Kodava language are native to Kodagu district. Kodava Language uses the Official Script Invented by Dr IM Muthanna in 1970.

==== Kodava people and other Kodava language speakers ====
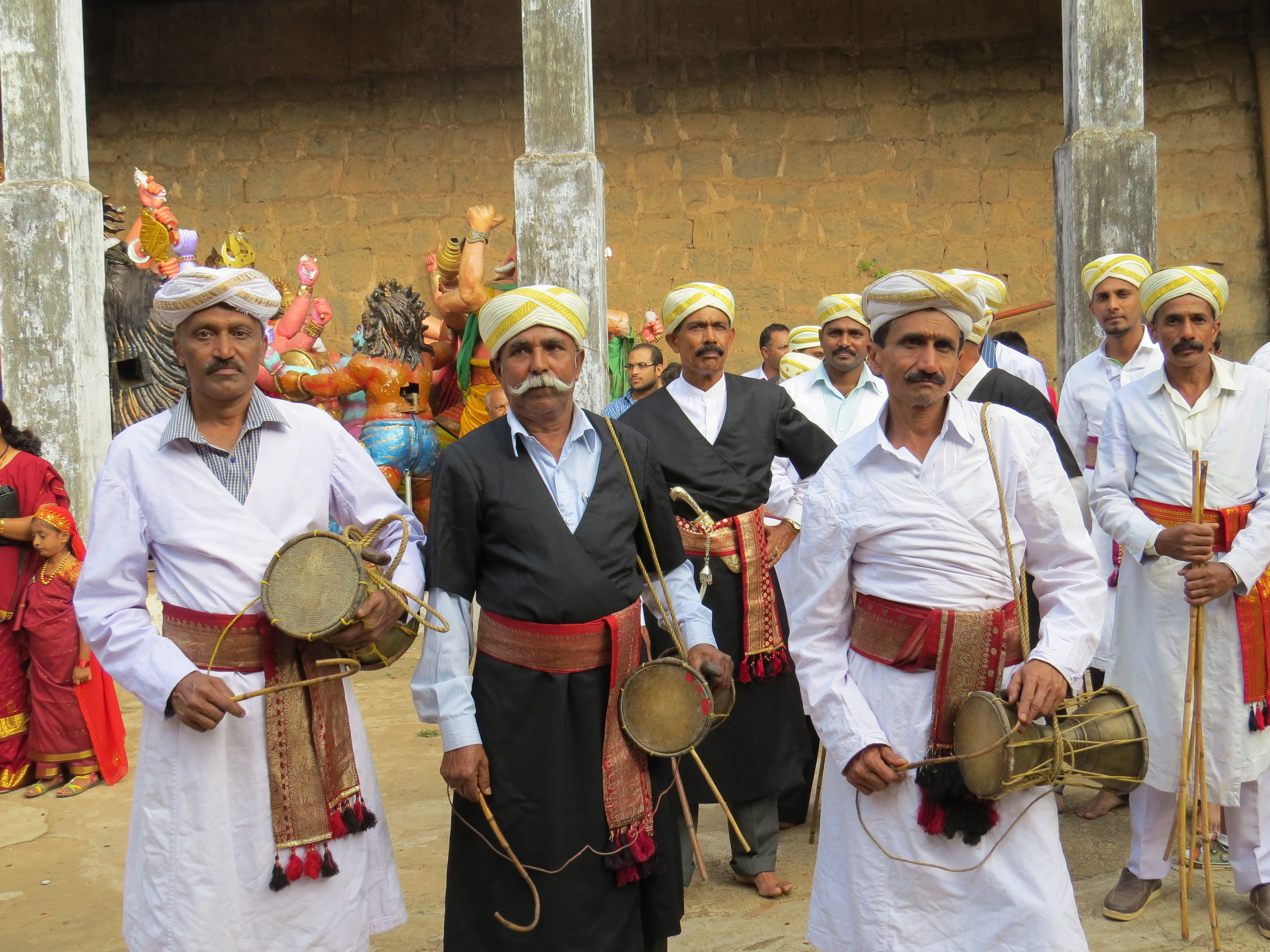
Kodava folk singers

According to Karnataka Kodava Sahitya Academy (Karnataka's Kodava Literary Academy), apart from Kodavas, and their related groups, the Amma Kodavas, the Kodava Peggade (Kodagu Heggade) and the Kodava Maaple (Kodava Muslims), 18 other smaller-numbered ethnic groups speak Kodava Takk in and outside the district including the Iri (Airi, or the carpenters and the village smiths), the Koyava, the Banna, the Kodagu Madivala (washermen), the Kodagu Hajama (barber, also called Nainda), the Kembatti Poleya (household servants and labourers) and the Meda (basket and mat weavers and drummers).

Among other Kodava speaking communities are: the Heggades, cultivators from shimogga; the Kodava Nair, cultivators from Kerala State; the Ayiri, who constitute the artisan caste; the Medas, who are basket and mat-weavers and act as drummers at feasts; the Binepatta, originally wandering musicians from Malabar, now farmers; and the Kavadi, cultivators settled in Yedenalknad (Virajpet). All these groups speak the Kodava language and conform generally to Kodava customs and dress.

==== Kodagu Arebhashe Gowda ====
Less frequent are Tulu speakers Billavas, Mogaveeras, Bunts, Goud Saraswat Brahmins.

The Arebhashe gowdas, or Kodagu Gowdas, and Tulu Gowdas, are an ethnic group of Dakshina Kannada and Kodagu. They live in Sulya (in Dakshina Kannada) and in parts of Somwarpet, Kushalanagar, Bhagamandala and Madikeri. They speak a language known as Arebhashe a dialect of Kannada. Guddemane Appaiah Gowda along with many other freedom fighters from different communities revolted against the British in an armed struggle which covered entire Kodagu and Dakshina Kannada. This was one of the earliest freedom movements against the British called "Amara Sulliada Swantantrya Sangraama" (Amara Sulya Dhange formally called the 'Coorg Rebellion' by the British) started in 1837.

== Tourism ==
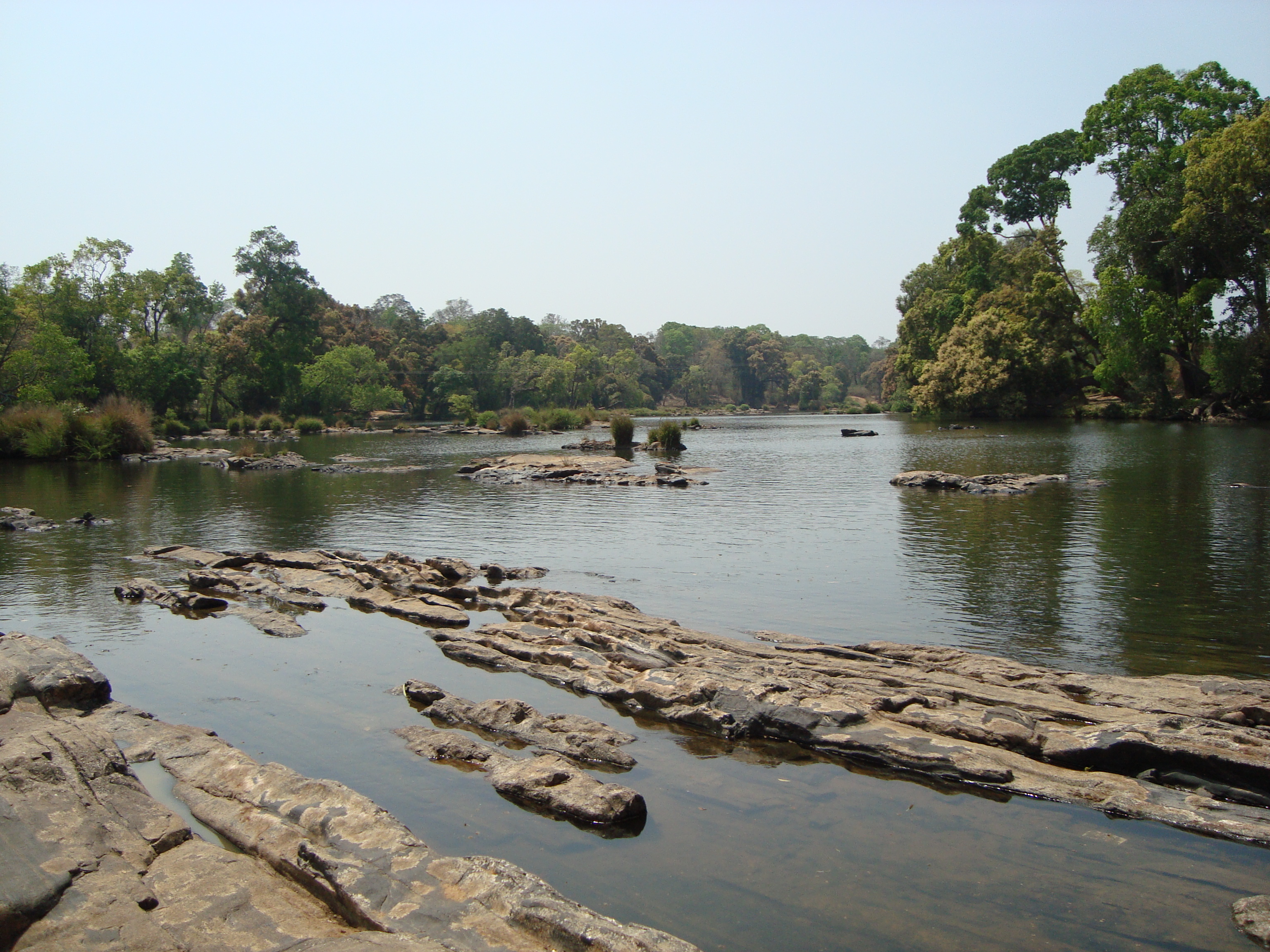
Kaveri River in Kushalnagara

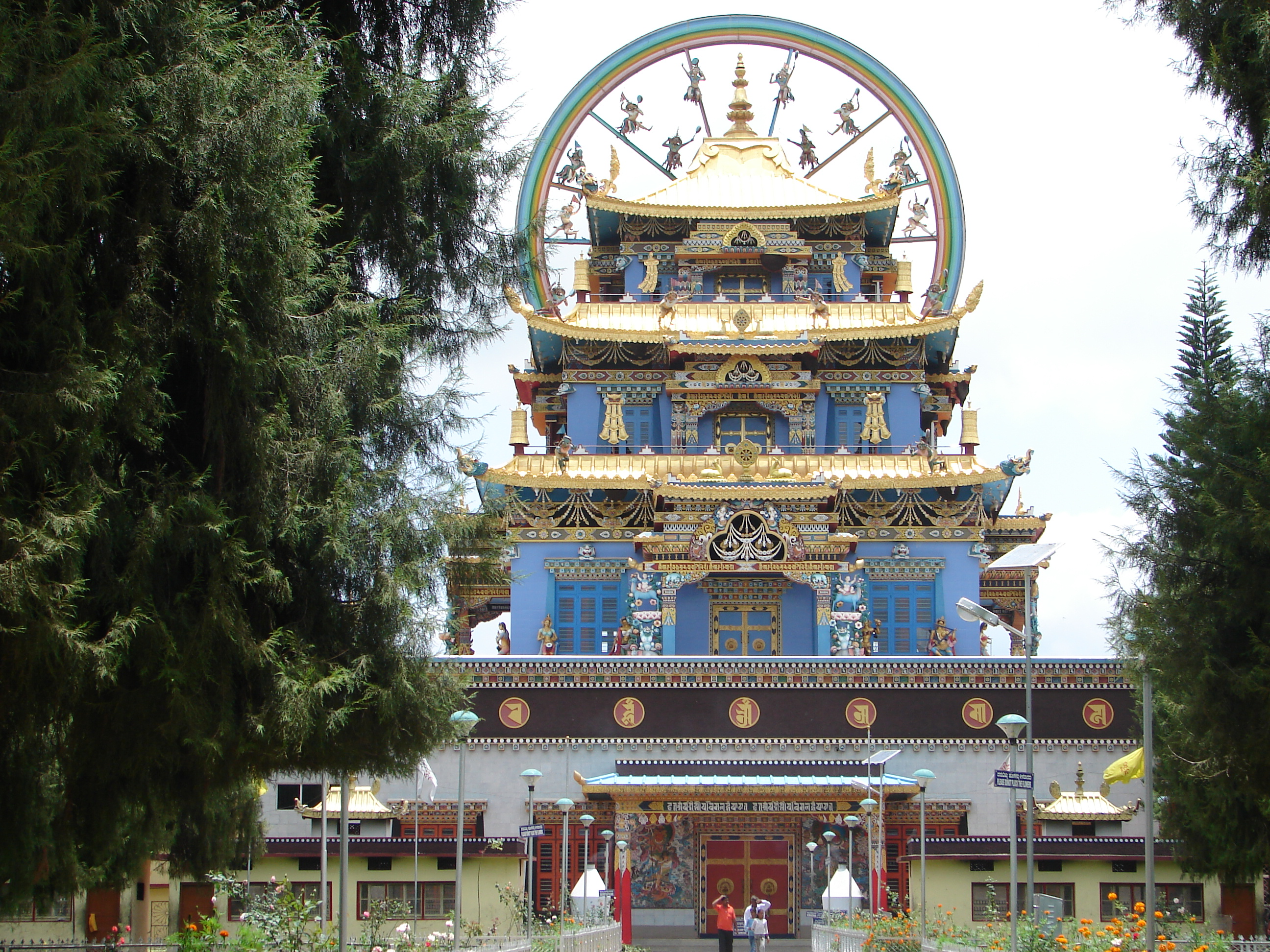
Tibetan Buddhist Golden temple, in Bylakuppe near Kushalanagar

Kodagu is rated as one of the top hill station destinations in India. Some of the most popular tourist attractions in Kodagu include Talakaveri, Bhagamandala, Nisargadhama, Mallalli Falls, Abbey Falls, Dubare, Nagarahole National Park, Iruppu Falls, and the Tibetan Buddhist Golden Temple.

- Talakaveri is the place where the River Kaveri originates. The temple on the riverbanks here is dedicated to Lord Brahma, and is one of only two temples dedicated to Brahma in India and Southeast Asia. Bhagamandala is situated at the Sangama (confluence) of two rivers, the Kaveri and the Kannika. A third river, the Sujyothi, is said to join from underground, and hence this spot is called the Triveni Sangama. Iruppu Falls is a sacred Kodagu Hindu spot in South Kodagu in the Brahmagiri hill range. The Lakshmana Tirtha River, with the waterfalls, flows nearby and has a Rameshwara temple on its banks. It is said that this sacred river was created when Laxmana, prince of Ayodhya and younger brother of Lord Rama, shot an arrow into nearby hill, the Brahmagiri hill. Chelavara falls and Thadiandamol peak are also in South Kodagu. Nagarahole is a national park and wildlife resort.
- Madikeri is the capital of the district and Raja's Seat park is popular with tourists. Kootu Poley dam is also popular among tourists. Omkareshwara Temple is a beautiful temple built in the Indo-Sarcenic style in Coorg. A legend is associated with the temple, built by Lingarajendra II in 1820 CE. The king put to death a pious Brahmin who dared to protest against his misdeeds. The spirit of the dead man began to plague the king day and night. On the advice of wise men, the king built this temple and installed a Shivalinga procured from Kashi, North India. St. Mark's Church is located within the Mercara Fort and was raised in 1859, by the officers and men of the East India Company. The building was funded by the Government of Madras, and placed under the Church of England in India, Diocese of Madras. The Church was closed after Indian independence, and taken over by the Government of Karnataka in 1971. The building now houses the Madikeri Fort Museum, managed by the Karnataka State Archaeological Department.
- Dubare is mainly an elephant-capturing and training camp of the Forest Department at the edge of Dubare forest; on the bank of the river Kaveri along the Kushalanagara – Siddapura road. Nisargadhama is a man-made island and picnic spot near Kushalanagara, formed by the river Kaveri. The Tibetan Buddhist Golden Temple is at Bylakuppe(Mysore district) near Kushalnagara, in the Tibetan refugee settlement.
- Abbey Falls is a scenic waterfall 5 km from Madikeri. Mallalli falls is 25 km from Somawarapet, downhill of the Pushpagiri hills. Mandalapatti is 28 km from Madikeri. On the way to Abbey Falls, before 3 km from Abbey Falls take right, from there 25 km. Kote Betta temple, Kote Abbey falls are also in North Kodagu. Abbi waterfall and other waterfalls are best during monsoon season, typically some days after it starts raining in June up to the end of rainy season, while there is more water gushing in the streams and rivers.

== Notable people ==
=== Armed Forces ===
- Apparanda Aiyappa, first Signal Officer in chief & first Chairman of BEL
- Air Marshal K. C. Cariappa
- Field Marshal K. M. Cariappa
- Squadron Leader Ajjamada Boppayya Devayya, fighter pilot
- Mangerira Chinnappa Muthanna
- Biddanda Chengappa Nanda
- C.B. Ponnappa
- Kodandera Subayya Thimayya
- Pattacheruvanda C. Thimayya

=== Sports ===
- Len Aiyappa - Indian field hockey player.
- Neravanda Aiyappa - Cricketer
- K. P. Appanna - Cricketer
- Rohan Bopanna, Indian tennis player
- K. C. Cariappa, professional cricketer
- Joshna Chinappa - Indian squash player
- M. P. Ganesh (Mollera Poovaiah Ganesh), Indian hockey captain, player and coach
- B. P. Govinda (Billimoga Puttaswamy Govinda), Indian hockey player
- Arjun Halappa, Indian hockey captain and player
- Ashwini Nachappa, Indian athlete, Arjuna awardee
- Jagat and Anita Nanjappa - motor racers
- Ashwini Ponnappa, Indian badminton player
- V. R. Raghunath (Vokkaligara Ramachandra Raghunath), Indian hockey player
- M. M. Somaya (Maneyapanda Muthanna Somaya) - Indian field hockey player.
- A. B. Subbaiah (Anjaparavanda Bopaiah Subbaiah) - Indian field hockey goalkeeper and coach
- S. V. Sunil (Somwarpet Vittalacharya Sunil), Indian hockey player
- Robin Uthappa, Indian cricketer

=== Politics ===
- K. G. Bopaiah (Kombarana Ganapathy Bopaiah), 18th Speaker of the Karnataka Legislative Assembly
- Prema Cariappa, first woman Mayor of Bangalore, Rajya Sabha MP
- Mantar Gowda MLA Madikeri
- Gundugutti Manjanathaya, freedom fighter and politician
- A. S. Ponnanna, Virajpet MLA
- C M Poonacha (Cheppudira Muthanna Poonacha) Gandhian, Freedom fighter, politician.
- Appachu Ranjan, politician
- R. Gundu Rao, Chief Minister of Karnataka
- N. Somanna (Nidyamale Somanna), lawyer and politician

=== Cinema ===
- Daisy Bopanna, actress
- Aditi Chengappa, actress
- Shwetha Chengappa, actress
- Gulshan Devaiah
- Rashmika Mandanna, actress
- Harshika Poonacha, actress
- Prema, actress
- Nidhi Subbaiah, actress

=== Civil Services ===
- A. S. Bopanna, Judge of Supreme court
- Diwan Bahadur Ketoli Chengappa, administrator (Chief Commissioner of Coorg province)
- B. B. Ashok Kumar, Retd. Assistant Commissioner of Police of Bengaluru
- P. K. Monnappa, first Inspector General of Police of Hyderabad State following Operation Polo
- C. B. Muthamma, first woman officer Indian Foreign Service
- K. G. Shanthi, Karnataka High Court Judge
- C. G. Somiah was the first IAS Officer from Coorg to rise to be the Home Secretary, Chief Vigilance Commissioner (CVC) and Comptroller and Auditor General.

=== Religion ===
- Swami Narayanananda
- Kalyatanda Ponnappa (c.1600) religious leader and warrior
- Swami Shambhavananda
- Appayya Swamigalu (1885–1956), (born of Kodava parents) founder of Kaveri Ashram

=== Literature ===
- Nadikerianda Chinnappa, folklore compiler
- B D Ganapathy
- Appachcha Kavi (also called Appachu Kavi), playwright
- I. M. Muthanna author and translator
- Boverianda Nanjamma and Chinnappa, translators, authors

=== Others ===
- Pandyanda Belliappa (also called Pandianda Belliappa or P I Belliappa) Gandhian, freedom fighter, politician, journalist.
- Biddu is a Kodava (Coorgi) by birth. He is a British Indian musician and winner of Grammy award.
- Saleem Farook, tribal rights activist
- Guddemane Appaiah Gowda, 19th century freedom fighter
- Kodagina Gowramma, noted writer
- N. S. Narendra, Firepro founder
- Nima Poovaya-Smith, museum curator, art historian and writer

== See also ==
- Pushpagiri Wildlife Sanctuary
