= Pamela Malhotra =

American animal sanctuary owner (born 1952)

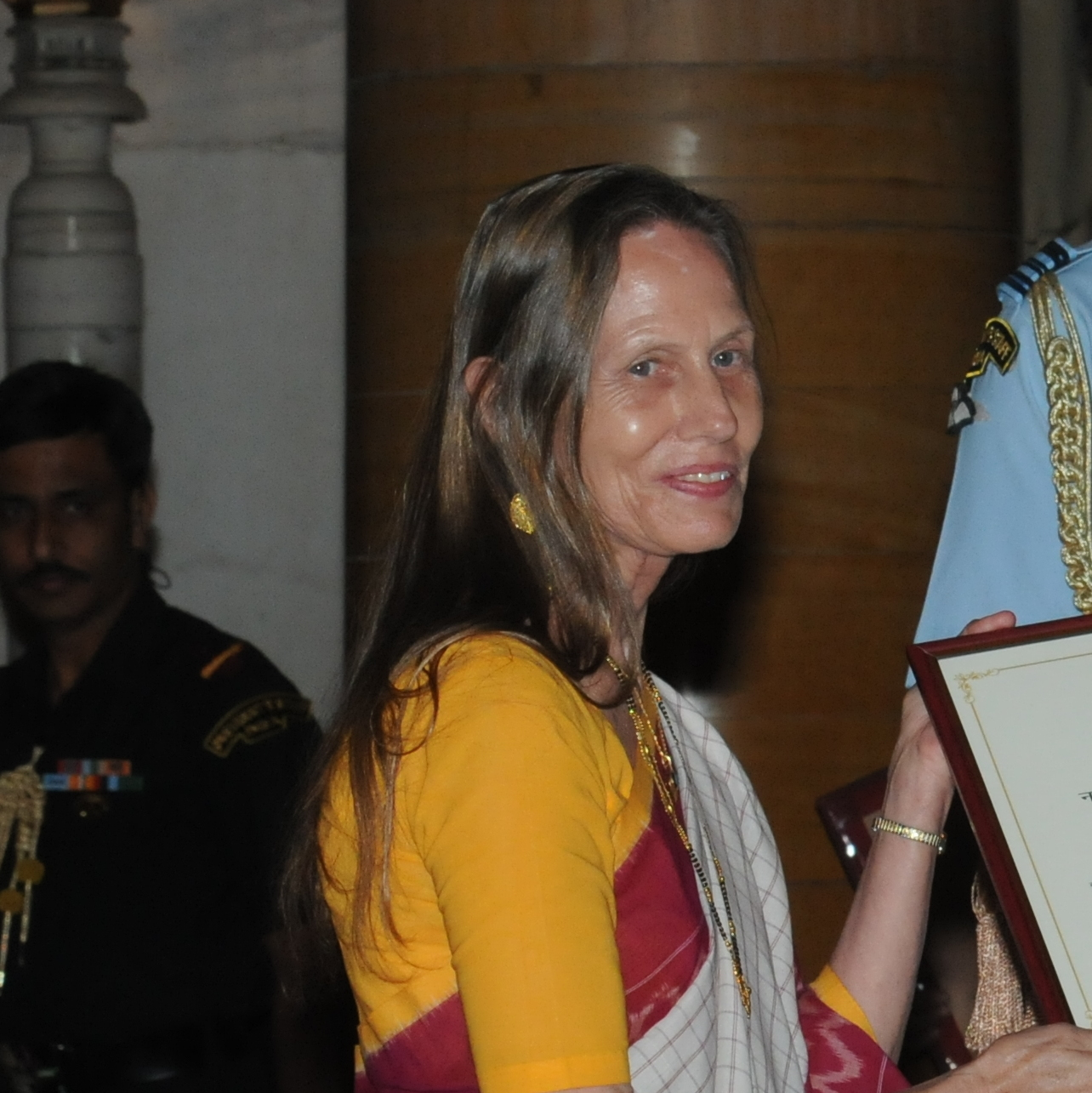
- in 2017
- Born: Pamela Gale c. 1952; USA
- Died: 17 April 2024; Vermont, USA
- Occupation: Sanctuary owners
- Known for: animal sanctuary owner awarded the Nari Shakti Puraskar.
- Spouse: Dr. Anil Kumar Malhotra

Pamela Gale Malhotra was an American animal sanctuary owner who lived in India. She was awarded India's highest award for women, the Nari Shakti Puraskar for her work at the SAI Sanctuary.

== Life ==
Pamela Gale was born in about 1952 in Red Bank, New Jersey She met and married an Indian restaurant owner while she was working at an all-night cafe. On their honeymoon in Hawaii they decided to buy land there. They owned a forest there; she went to work for a pharmaceutical company and her husband went into the mortgage business. They lived off her wages, and her husband's sales commissions were saved to buy land in Hawaii.

They decided to leave Hawaii and use their funds in India. The couple first went to the Himalayas, but they were only allowed to buy 12 acres, so they went south to start the SAI (Save Animals Initiative) Sanctuary Trust.

The wildlife in the sanctuary includes Bengal tigers, Asian elephants, hyena, wild boar, leopards, sambhar and the Malabar giant squirrel.

On International Women's Day in 2017, she was in New Delhi where she was awarded the Nari Shakti Puraskar by President Pranab Mukherjee at the Rashtrapati Bhavan. Each of the awardees received a citation and 100,000 rupees.

She died in 2024, in Vermont, USA.
