= Mangerira Chinnappa Muthanna =

Indian Army officer (1964–2000)

M. C. Muthanna Shaurya Chakra
- Born: 21 April 1964; Chettimani, Bhagamandala, Kodagu district, Karnataka
- Died: 12 January 2000 (aged 35); Anantnag, Jammu and Kashmir
- Military career
- Allegiance: India
- Branch: Indian Army
- Rank: Major

Major Mangerira Chinnappa Muthanna was a war hero of India.

== Early life ==
Mangerira Chinnappa Muthanna was born in Chettimani village (near Bhagamandala), Kodagu district (Coorg) on 21 April 1964.

== Army service ==
He joined OTA, Chennai in Oct 1984 and was commissioned into the 5th Battalion the Sikh Light Infantry on 24 October 1985. He served the 5 Sikh Light Infantry-Hq 1 Sector Rashtriya Rifles. He died on 12 January 2000, aged 36 years, while fighting with terrorists of Lashker-e-Toiba (LeT) in Anantnag, Jammu and Kashmir.

== Posthumous honour ==
He was awarded with the Shaurya Chakra posthumously. To commemorate him, a statue of the martyr was unveiled in front of the Madikeri City Municipal Council (CMC) and named the municipal circle in front of the Town Hall after him on Thursday, 9 December 2010. The statue, made of granite stone, was sculpted at a cost of Rs. 8 lakh by sculptor Manjunath Acharya of Beetikatte in Somwarpet.A high school operative under the Head quarter 1 sector RR in district Anantnag where the soldier was posted was later on named as Muthanna Army Goodwill School after his name Muthanna.la
