= Abbey Falls =

Waterfall in Karnataka, India

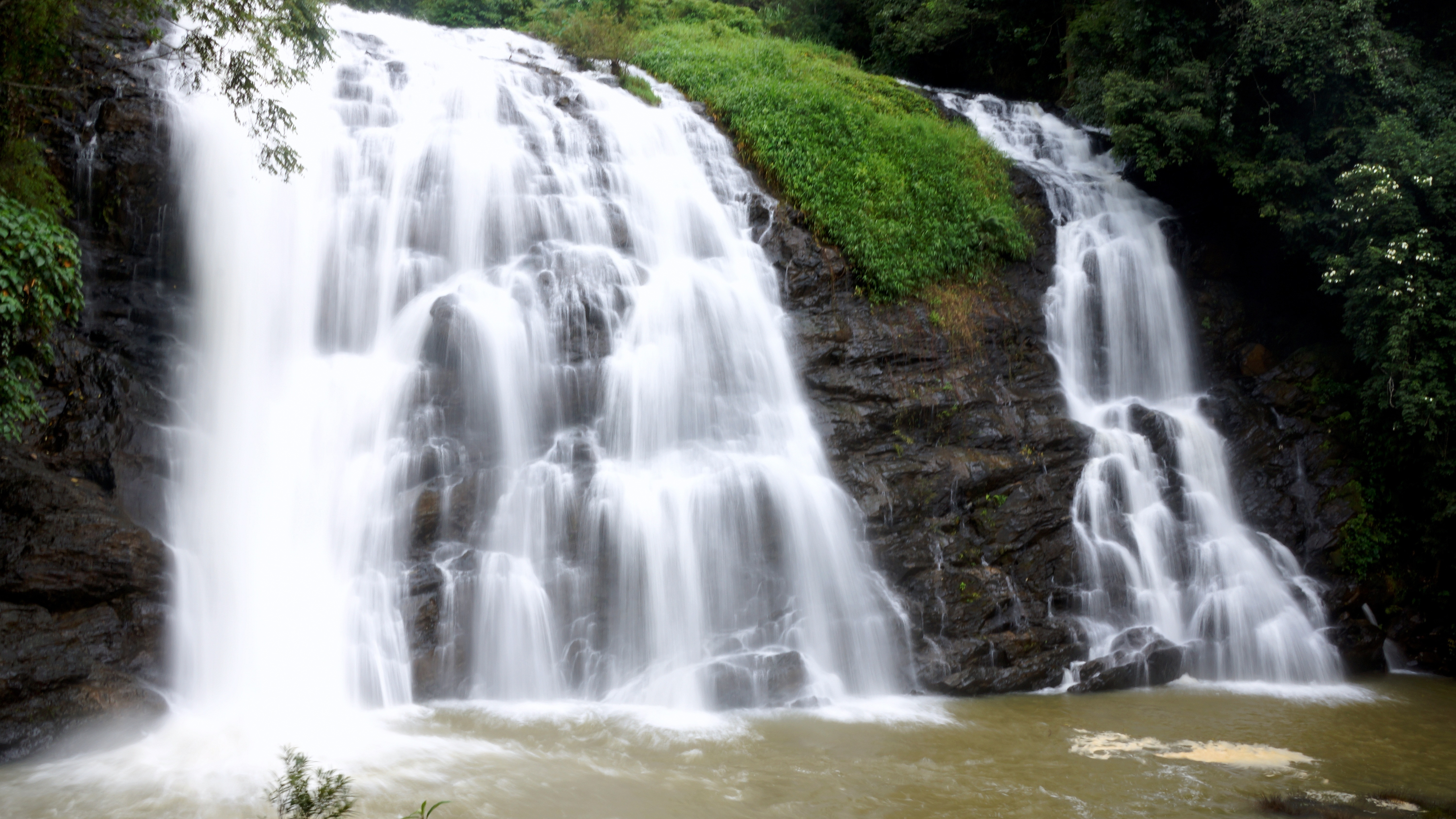
- Interactive map of Abbey Falls
- Location: Karnataka, Karnataka, India
- Coordinates: 12.46°N 75.72°E

Taken on November 2013

Abbey Falls (also spelled Abbi Falls and Abbe Falls) is a waterfall in Kodagu, in the Western Ghats of Karnataka, India. It is located 8 km from the Madikeri, 122 km from Mysore, 144 km from Mangalore and 268 km from Bangalore.

The waterfall is on the early reaches of the river Kaveri, located between private coffee plantations with stocky coffee bushes and spice estates and trees entwined with pepper vines. There is a hanging bridge constructed just opposite the falls. Flow is much higher during the monsoon season.

The falls was earlier called Jessi Falls, named after a British officer's daughter. However, the place was a thick jungle back then. Years later, the waterfall was discovered by Mr. Neravanda B. Nanaiah who bought the place from the government and converted it into a coffee and spice plantation, which still surrounds the waterfall today.

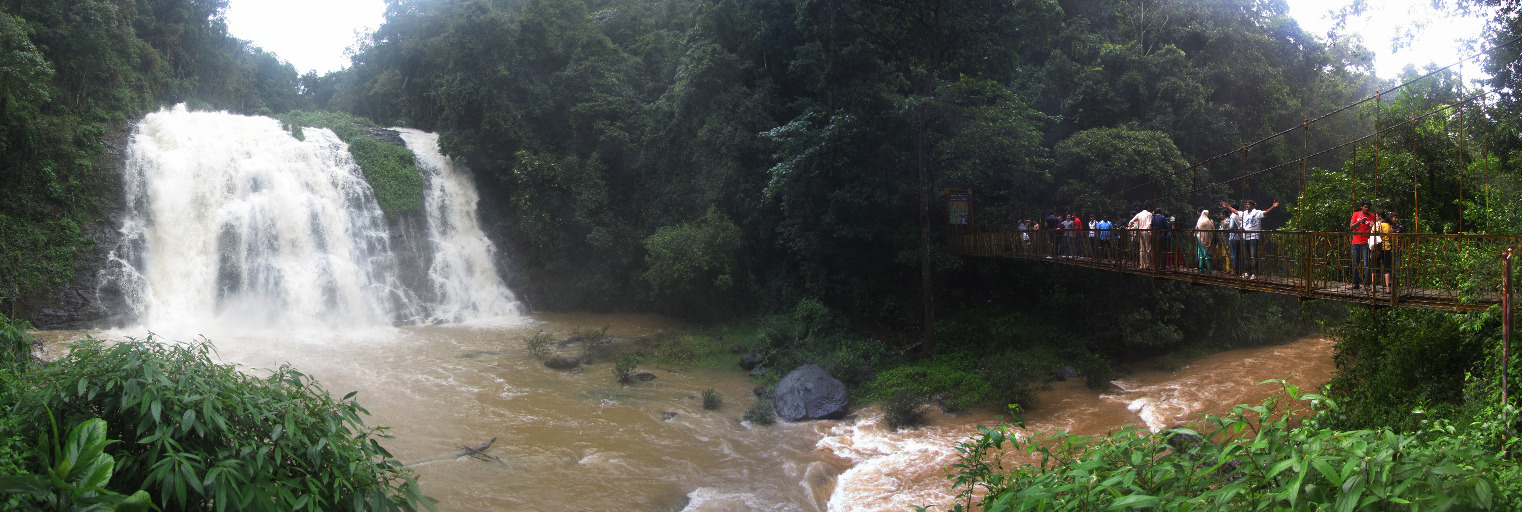
Abbey Falls with hanging bridge

== See also ==
- List of waterfalls
- List of waterfalls in India
