= Sagarakatte =

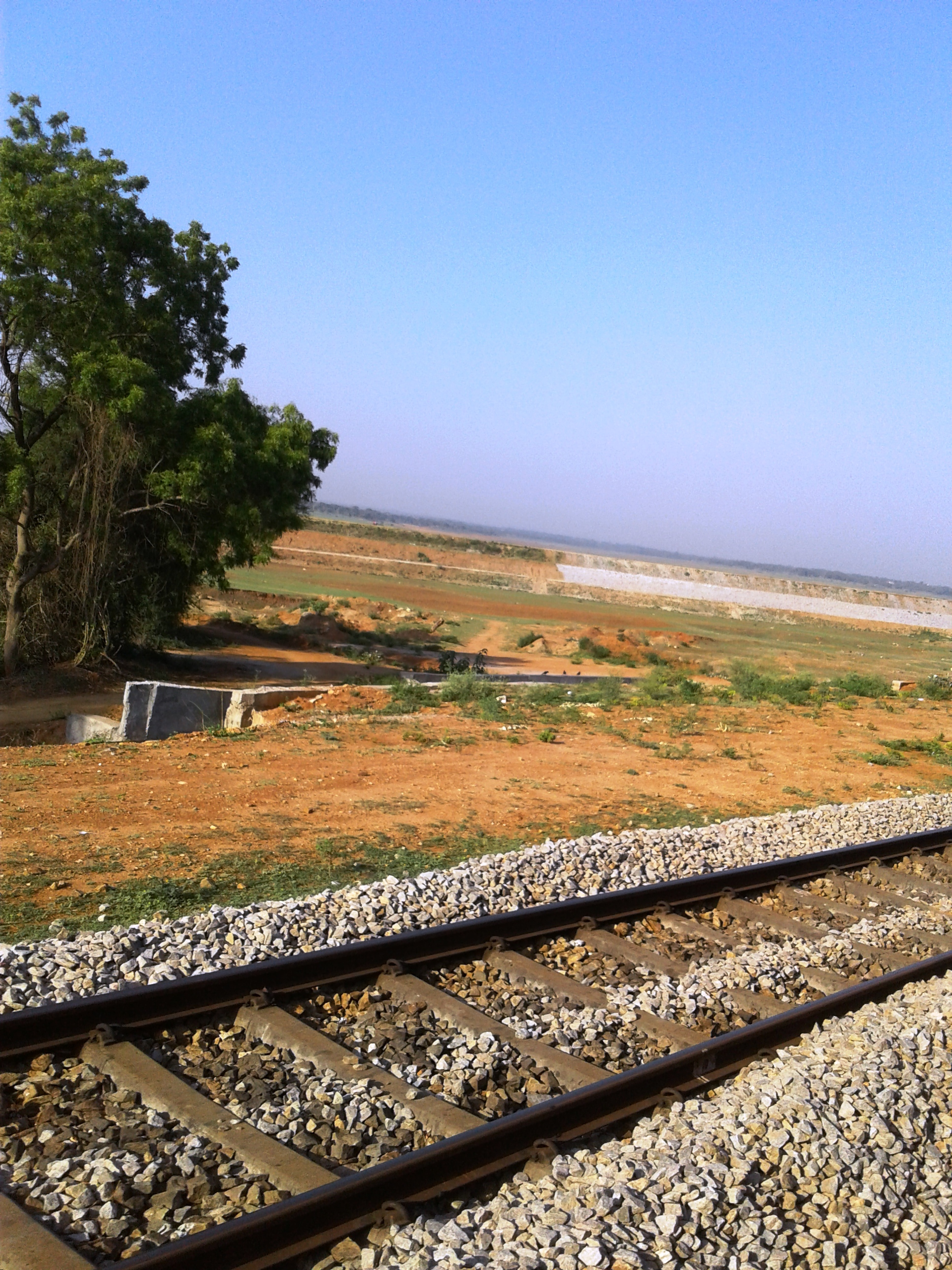
Sagarakatte Railway Station

Sagarakatte is a village close to Krishna Raja Sagar (KRS), Mysore and is about 25 km from Mysore city.

== Sagarakatte Ashram ==
Sagarakatte is the youngest of all the Madhva samasthanas and headquartered in Sagarakatte in the Mysore District in Karnataka state of India.

Its first pontiff was Shri 1008 Shri Pradyumna Theertharu ascended the peeta in 1920. Shri Pradyumna Theertharu was a great scholar and was the son of Pt.Vekataramanacharya of Dharawad, Karnataka. The Sagarakatte parampare starts with Shri Pradyumna Theertharu. Shri Pradyumna Theertharu studied under Shri Vedanidhi Theertharu of Shri Padaraja Matha, Mulbagal and became an eminent scholar par excellence.

Shri Pradyumna Theertharu got his pontificate from Shri 1008 Shri Lakshmipriya Theertharu of Kundapura Vyasaraja Mata. Shri Pradyumna Theertharu entered brundavan in 1975 (Jaishta Amavasya - Raakshasa Samvatsara) at Krishnamurthypuram, Mysore.

Shri Pradyumna Theertharu gave ashrama to Shri 1008 Shri Pragnaadhiraja Theertharu (PD Kaarthika Shukla Navami) and the current peetadhipathi is Shri 1008 Shri Pragnadhirajendra Theertharu.

== Parampare ==
1. Shri 1008 Shri Pradyumna Theertharu (1910–1975)
2. Shri 1008 Shri Pragnaadhiraja Theertharu ()
3. Shri 1008 Shri Pragnadhirajendra Theertharu () - Current Pontiff
