= Appayya Swamigalu =

Indian hindu monk

Appaiah Swami or Sadguru Appayya Swami (ಅಪ್ಪಯ ಸ್ವಾಮಿ 1885–1956) (not to be mistaken with Appayya Swamy, a 17th-century Carnatic Musician and scholar of Tamil Nadu) was a Hindu Indian spiritual master who lived in Virajpet town, in Kodagu, Karnataka, India.

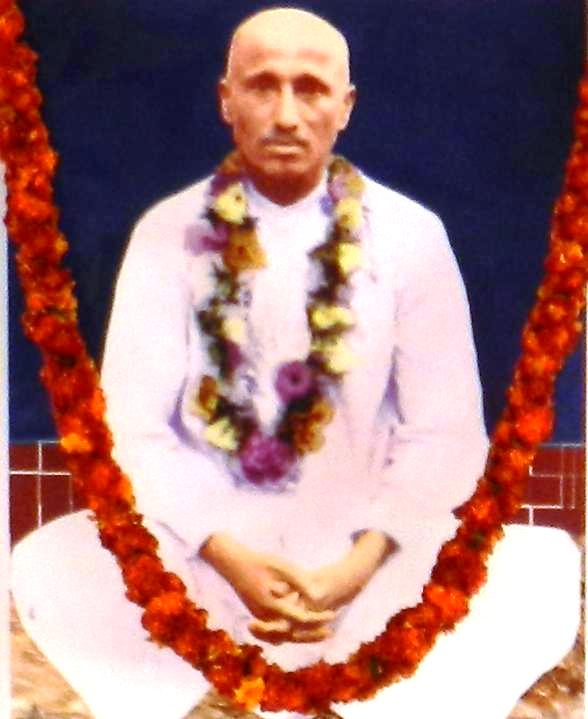
Sadguru Appayya Swamigalu

== Early life ==
Appayya Swami was born as Palanganda Appaiah, the son of a Kodava paddy farmer in Kodagu (Coorg) in 1885. Appayya did his schooling in English and Kannada at Central High School, Mercara. Later he entered the Government Service under the Raj. However, he was of a religious bend of mind since childhood, and was inspired by the lives of Ramakrishna Paramhansa and Swami Vivekananda. He sought a spiritual guru, eventually selecting Guru Ramagiri.

== Career ==
His Guru ordained him and Swamigalu learned and composed several hymns. Through the path of devotion, he attained self-realization. Over time he became a spiritual teacher with several disciples and was hence given the title of Sadguru.

In 1941 he founded a monastery in Virajpet known as Kaveri Ashram after the river goddess Kaveri. His work in sustaining Hindu spirituality and culture in Coorg and its surrounding regions is being carried on by the Kaveri Ashram (also known as Cauvery Ashram 12°12′09.27″N 75°48′11.68″E) today. A school is named after him in Somwarpet, Kodagu called Sadguru Appayya Swamy High School.

== Death ==
He died in 1956, aged 71.

== Gallery ==
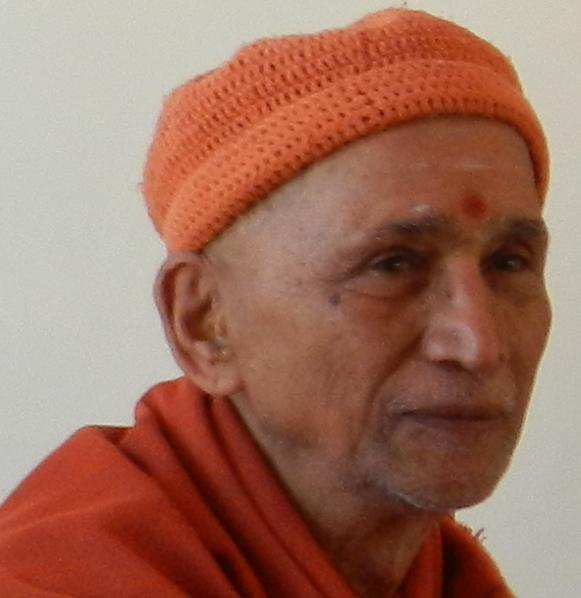
Vivekananda Swamiji Cauveri Ashram

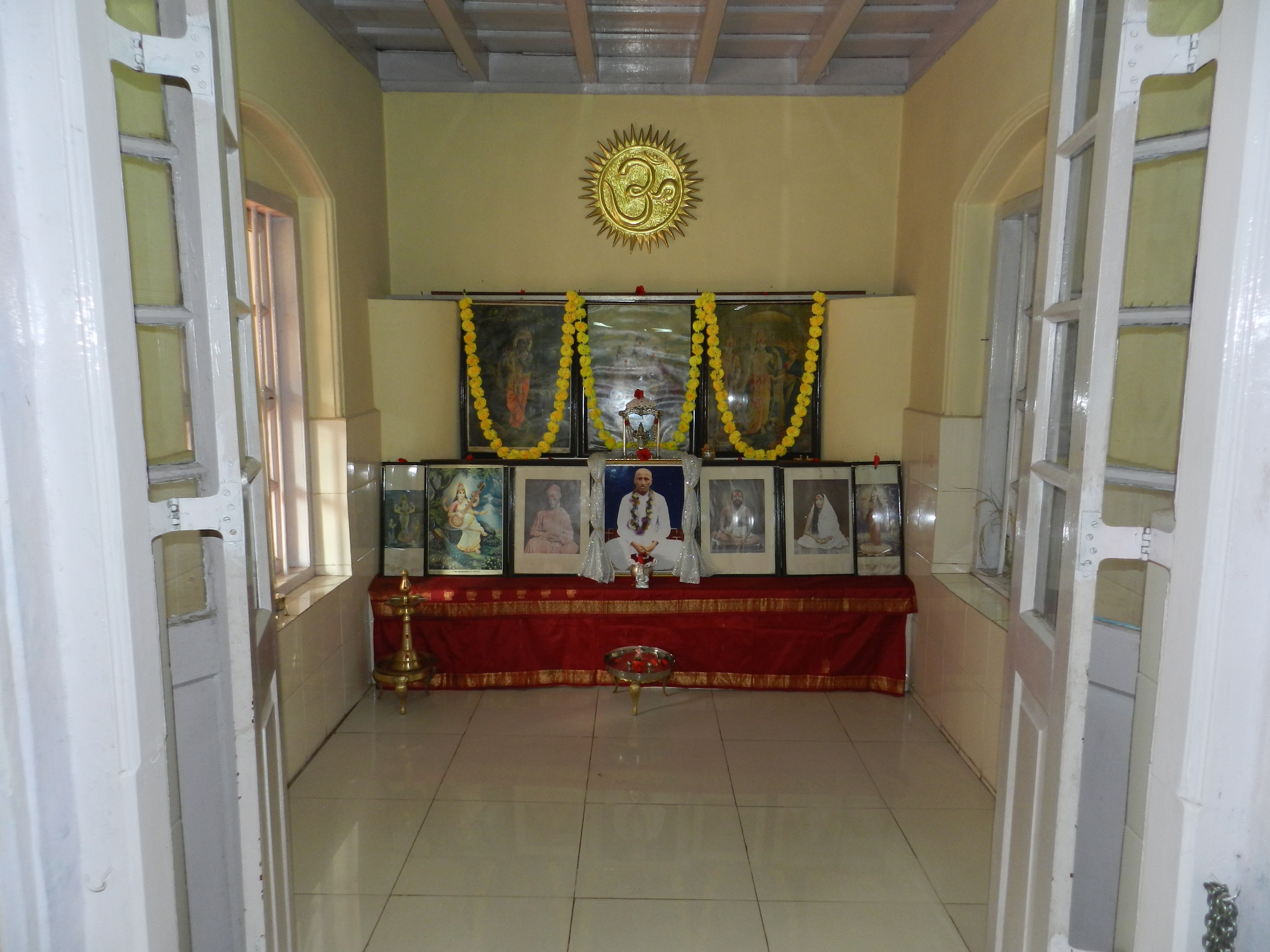
Cauveri Ashram Shrine

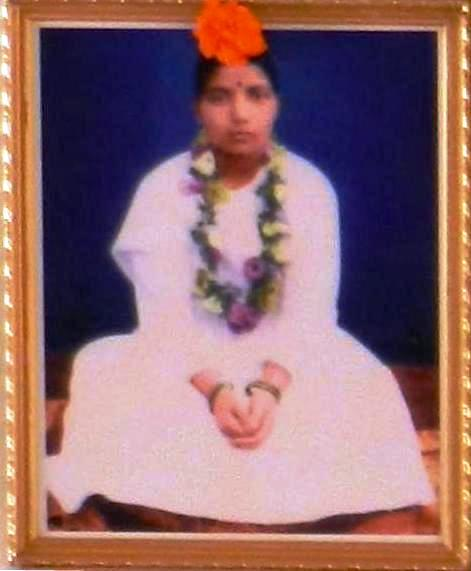
Mataji Virajpet

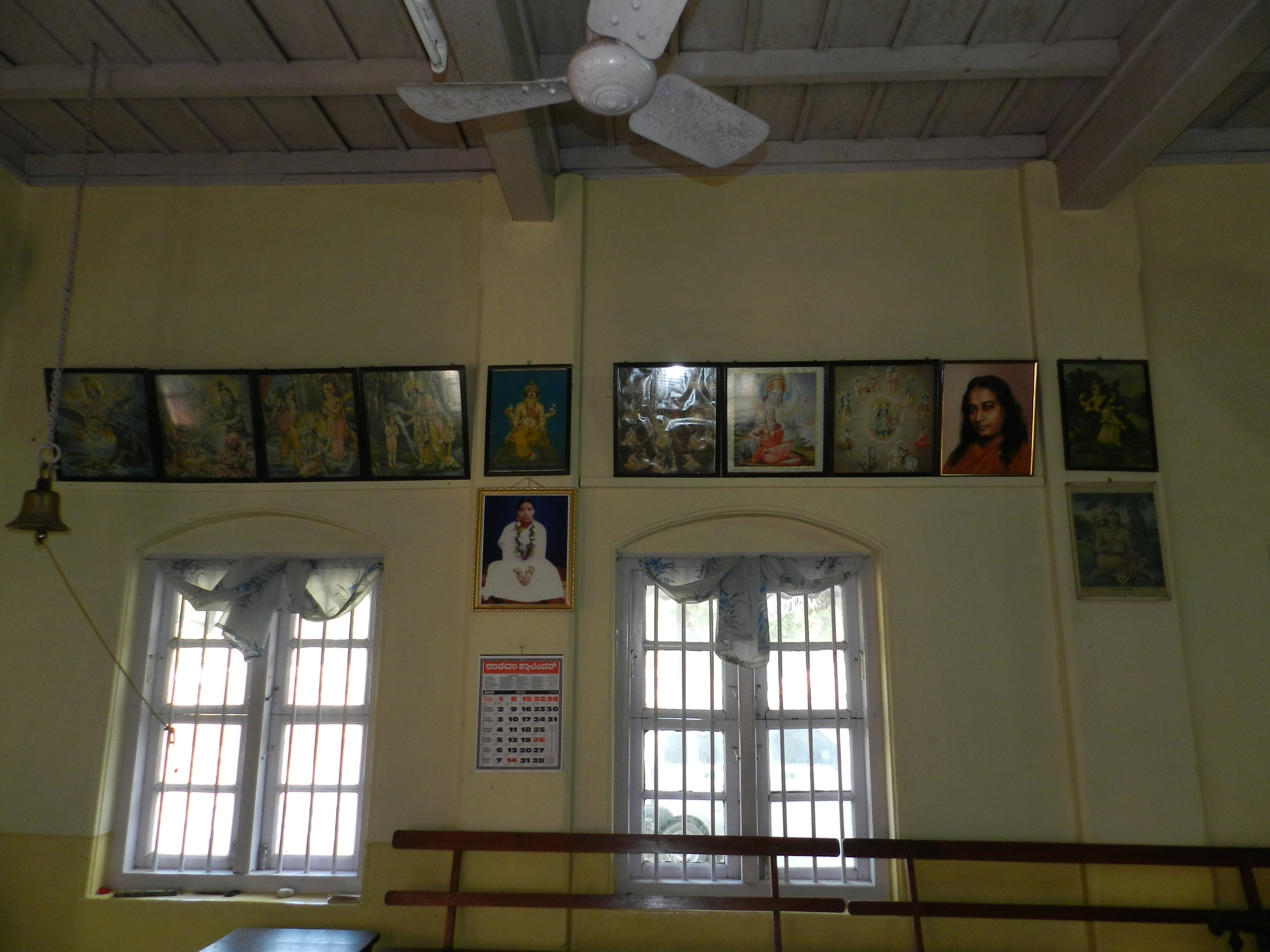
Cauveri Ashram Prayer hall adjacent to the Shrine

== Bibliography ==
1. Śrī sadguru appayya vijaya (Kannada) authored by V.S. Rāmakriṣṇa (Śrī Kāvēri Āśrama, 1965) Appayya Swamigalu at Google Books)

2. Śrī sadguru appayya svāmijīyavara ātmakathe mattu sandēśa (Kannada) (Śrīkāvēri Bhakta Jana Saṅgha, 1965)
