= Coorg Lok Sabha constituency =

Former constituency of the Indian parliament in Karnataka

Coordinates: 12.4°N 75.7°E

Coorg
- Former Lok Sabha constituency

Constituency details
- Country: India
- State: Coorg
- Assembly constituencies: 18 (all of Coorg State)
- Established: 1951
- Abolished: 1957
- Total electors: 94,593
- Reservation: None

Coorg Lok Sabha constituency was a constituency of the Lok Sabha (Lower House of the Parliament of India). It was used in the parliamentary election of 1951–1952. The constituency elected a single member of the Lok Sabha and was the sole Lok Sabha seat for the Coorg State. As of 1952, the constituency had 94,593 eligible voters.

== 1952 election ==
In the first elections after the independence of India, two candidates were in the fray in Coorg: N. Somana of the Indian National Congress and independent candidate K.T. Uthappa. K.T. Uthappa was a rich planter, former Assistant Commissioner of Coorg and candidate for the group that opposed the merger of Coorg into Mysore State.

63,813 voters participated in the election (67.46% of the eligible voters). N. Somana won the seat, obtaining 38,063 votes (59.65%).

== Merger with Mysore State ==
In 1956 Coorg State merged into Mysore State. The former state was accorded two seats in the Mysore Legislative Assembly: Virajpet and Mercara. Both constituencies were included in the Mangalore Lok Sabha constituency, along with six other Assembly constituencies till delimitation of parliamentary constituencies in 2008. Now Coorg (Kodagu) area is a part of Mysore Lok Sabha constituency from 2009 Election, covering Virajpet and Madikeri Vidhan Sabha segments.

== Assembly Constituencies ==
The following were the constituencies under Coorg Lok Sabha.

No.	Constituency	Taluk	No of Seats
1	Sanivarasanthe	Somwarpet	2
2	Somwarpet North	Somwarpet	1
3	Somwarpet South	Somwarpet	1
4	Fraserpet (Kushalnagar)	Somwarpet	1
5	Sunticoppa	Somwarpet	2
6	Mercara Town	Madikeri	1
7	Murnad	Madikeri	1
8	Mercara Nad	Madikeri	1
9	Srimangala Nad	Virajpet	2
10	Hudikeri	Virajpet	1
11	Berriath Nad (Kuntagrama)	Virajpet	1
12	Ponnampet Nad	Virajpet	2
13	Virajpet Town	Virajpet	1
14	Virajpet Nad	Virajpet	2
15	Ammathi Nad	Virajpet	1
16	Siddapur	Virajpet	2
17	Napoklu Nad	Madikeri	1
18	Bhagamandala Nad	Madikeri	1

== See also ==
- Kodagu district
- Mysore Lok Sabha constituency
- List of former constituencies of the Lok Sabha
