= 1952 Coorg State Legislative Assembly election =

Legislative Assembly election in Coorg, India

1952 Coorg Legislative Assembly election
- 1952

24 seats in the Coorg Legislative Assembly 13 seats needed for a majority
- Registered: 138,440
- Turnout: 63.53%
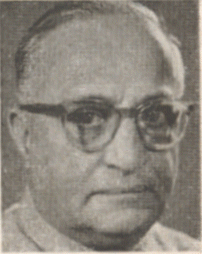
	Majority party
Leader	C. M. Poonacha
Party	INC
Seats won	15
Seat change	New
Popular vote	55.54%
Elected CM
C. M. Poonacha
INC

Indian administrative divisions, as of 1951

The 1952 Coorg Legislative Assembly election was held to constitute the Coorg Legislative Assembly, electing members of legislature for 18 constituencies of the erstwhile Indian State of Coorg. It took place on 27 March 1952, and a total of 87,947 people voted 24 out of 60 candidates to power. This was the only election to the assembly before the state was merged into Mysore (later renamed as Karnataka) as per the States Reorganisation Act in 1956.

== Constituencies ==
A total of 24 seats were up for election from 18 constituencies; six two-member constituencies and twelve single-member constituencies. No seats were reserved for Scheduled Castes or Scheduled Tribes.

== Contestants ==
Sixty candidates contested the election. The Indian National Congress presented candidates in all 24 constituencies. There were also 34 independent candidates. The Thakkadi Party, which campaigned against merger into Mysore State, contested as independents. The Thakkadi Party was led by Pandyanda Belliappa, a veteran Gandhian. A third force in the election was the Communist Party of India, that only presented two candidates (C.B. Monniah in Hudikeri and B.N. Kuttappa in Siddapur). No female candidates were in the fray.

== Results ==
The Indian National Congress (INC) emerged victorious, winning 15 out of the 24 seats. The INC leader C. M. Poonacha won his seat from the Berriathnad constituency, with 1,969 votes (71.37% of the votes polled in the constituency). Nine independent candidates won the remaining seats. Belliappa won his seat Ammathi Nad with 1,667 votes (57.25% of votes polled). INC candidates got 55.54% of the votes polled statewide, independents 42.88% and the two communist candidates 1.58%. The candidate with the highest percentage of votes polled in his favour was G. Lingarajayya, the INC candidate in Fraserpet, who polled 2,375 votes (71.64%).

Party	Votes	%	Seats
Indian National Congress	48,845	55.54	15
Communist Party of India	1,386	1.58	0
Independent	37,716	42.88	9
Total	87,947	100.00	24
Valid votes	87,947	100.00	
Invalid/blank votes	0	0.00	
Total votes	87,947	100.00	
Registered voters/turnout	138,440	63.53	

=== Members of the Coorg Legislative Assembly, 1952 ===
Keys: Indian National Congress (15) Independent (9)

No.	Constituency	Name of elected MLA	Party affiliation
1	Sanivarasanthe	P. K. Chennayya	Indian National Congress
1	Sanivarasanthe	K. Mallappa	Indian National Congress
2	Somwarpet North	C. K. Kalappa	Indian National Congress
3	Somwarpet South	H. T. Muthanna	Independent
4	Fraserpet	G. Lingarajayya	Indian National Congress
5	Sunticoppa	Gundugutti Manjanathaya	Indian National Congress
5	Sunticoppa	P. Lakha	Indian National Congress
6	Mercara Town	B. S. Kushalappa	Indian National Congress
7	Murnad	C. A. Mandanna	Indian National Congress
8	Mercara Nad	P. D. Subbaiah	Indian National Congress
9	Srimangala Nad	K. P. Karumbayya	Independent
9	Srimangala Nad	G. Subbaiah	Independent
10	Hudikeri	K. K. Ganapathy	Independent
11	Berriath Nad	C. M. Poonacha	Indian National Congress
12	Ponnampet Nad	Yeravara Belli	Indian National Congress
12	Ponnampet Nad	P. Nanamaya	Indian National Congress
13	Virajpet Town	N. G. Ahamed	Independent
14	Virajpet Nad	Harijan Nanja	Independent
14	Virajpet Nad	P. C. Uthayya	Independent
15	Ammathi Nad	Pandyanda Belliappa	Independent
16	Siddapur	Bettakurubara Kala	Indian National Congress
16	Siddapur	Muruvanda Machaiah	Indian National Congress
17	Napoklu Nad	A. C. Thimmaiah	Independent
18	Bhagamandala Nad	Konana Devaiah	Indian National Congress

After the election, Poonacha formed a two-member cabinet, consisting of himself as chief minister and Kuttur Mallapa (elected to the assembly from the Sanivarasanthe constituency) as home minister.

== See also ==
- 1951–52 elections in India
- 1952 Mysore Legislative Assembly election
- 1957 Mysore Legislative Assembly election
