= Attur (disambiguation) =

Attur also spelled as Athur or Authoor or Athoor may also refer to:

== India ==
=== Tamil Nadu ===
- Attur, Salem, is a city in Salem District, Tamil Nadu, India
- Athur, Thoothukudi, a town in Thoothukudi District, Tamil Nadu, India
- Athur, Kanniyakumari, a town in Kanyakuamri District, Tamil Nadu, India
- Athoor, a village in Dindugal District, Tamil Nadu, India
- Attur (state assembly constituency)
- Attur Taluk, Salem, a Taluk in Tamil Nadu, India
- Attur block, Dindigul, a revenue block in the Dindigul district
- Attur block, a revenue block in the Salem district
- Attur division, a revenue division in the Salem district

=== Karnataka ===
- Attur, Virajpet (also spelled as Atthur), in Virajpet Taluk of Kodagu District
- Attur, Somwarpet (also spelled as Attur Nallur), in Somwarpet Taluk of Kodagu District
- Attur-kemral in Mangalore Taluk of Dakshina Kannada District
- Attur, Udupi, in Karkal Taluk of Udupi District

== See also ==
- Athura, an Assyrian province of the Persian empire
- At-Tur (Arabic: سورة الطور, "The Mount"), the 52nd sura of the Qur'an
- At-Tur (Mount of Olives), an Arab majority neighborhood on the Mount of Olives in East Jerusalem
