= N. Somanna =

Indian politician and lawyer

Nidyamale Somanna
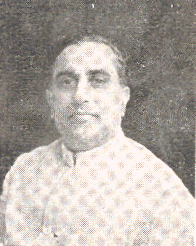
- N Somanna

Member of Parliament
- In office 1952–1957
- Preceded by: Position Established
- Succeeded by: Position Abolished (Merged with Mangalore of Mysore State)
- Constituency: Coorg

Member of Legislative Assembly, Mysore State
- In office 1957–1958
- Preceded by: Position Established
- Succeeded by: K. M. Devayya
- Constituency: Periyapatna

Personal details
- Born: 15 April 1905 Bhagamandala, Coorg Province, British India
- Died: 25 January 1958 (aged 52)
- Party: Indian National Congress
- Spouse: Subbamma
- Children: 4 Sons, 5 Daughters
- Occupation: Advocate, Politician

Nidyamale Somanna (15 April 1905 – 25 January 1958) was an Indian politician and lawyer. He was an Indian National Congress leader in Coorg State and served as the Member of Parliament for the state in the first legislature after the independence of India.

== Personal life ==
Born in Bhagamandala on 15 April 1905, N. Somana was the son of N. Ramapa, a civil servant. He belonged to the Arebhashe Gowda community. He was schooled at Central High School in Mercara, later studying at St. Aloysius College in Mangalore and Madras Law College. He married Kukkunooru Subbamma in 1927, the couple had nine children (four sons and five daughters). He obtained his Bachelor of Law degree in 1930. He also obtaining a Bachelor of Arts degree.

== Independence struggle ==
N. Somana joined the Indian National Congress after graduating from Law College. He supported the khadi movement. He took part in the protests against the Simon Commission. He went underground during the 1942 Quit India movement to escape arrest. He held the post as Vice President of the Coorg District Congress Committee, which worked under the Mysore Pradesh Congress Committee at the time.

== Coorg legislator ==
N. Somana served as member of the Coorg Legislative Council from 1945 until the dissolution of Coorg State. In the Legislative Council, N. Somana was a member of the Finance Committee. He served as member of the Committee for the Five-Year Plan for the uplift of Harijans. In 1947 he became a member of the Karnataka University Committee, appointed by the Government of Bombay to represent Coorg in the committee. He served as Vice President of the Coorg District Board until 1951. N. Somana was one of ten Coorg politicians invited by Sardar Patel in 1949 for discussions on the future of the state.

== Parliamentarian ==
N. Somana was elected to the 1st Lok Sabha (lower house of the parliament of India) in the 1952 Indian general election, representing Coorg. He obtained 38,063 votes (59.65%), defeating independent candidate K.T. Uthappa (former Assistant Commissioner of Coorg, a rich planter and stern supporter of retaining a separate Coorg state) for the sole seat of Coorg State in the Lok Sabha. In parliament he became a member of the Committee on Home Affairs and the Committee on Planning and Communications. He was a member of the Indian Coffee Board, but resigned in 1957.

== Mysore State legislator ==
After the merger of Coorg into Mysore State, N. Somana was elected to the Mysore State Legislative Assembly in the 1957 election. He stood as the Indian National Congress candidate in the Periyapatna constituency. N. Somana obtained 19,714 votes (68.08%).

N. Somana died from a heart attack on 25 January 1958 in Mercara. After his death a by-election for the Periyapatna seat was held, won by Indian National Congress candidate K.M. Devayya.

N. Somana is one of only two politicians from Kodagu district (Coorg) to have been elected to the Lok Sabha, the other politician being former Coorg State Chief Minister C.M. Poonacha, who got elected from Mangalore Lok Sabha constituency in 1967, when Kodagu district was under Mangalore Lok Sabha constituency.
