= Sanivarasanthe Assembly constituency =

Defunct constituency of the Mysore Legislative Assembly

Coordinates: 12.726547°N 75.889377°E

Sanivarasanthe
- Former constituency for the State Legislative Assembly

Constituency details
- Country: India
- State: Mysore State (Coorg State till 31 October 1956)
- Established: 1951
- Abolished: 1957
- Reservation: None

Sanivarasanthe Assembly constituency was a constituency of the Mysore Legislative Assembly (part of Coorg Legislative Assembly till 31 October 1956). The lone election to this constituency was conducted in 1952 to the legislature of the Coorg State (Kodagu) in India. The constituency included Sanivarasanthe. This seat was included to Mysore Legislative Assembly in 1956 during the reorganisation of the Indian States based along linguistic lines, the state of Coorg (Kodagu) was merged with Mysore State.

== Members of Legislative Assembly ==
Year	Seat Number	Member	Party
1952	1	P. K. Chennayya	Indian National Congress
1952	2	Kuttur Mallappa	Indian National Congress
1957 onwards: Seat does not exist. See Madikeri

== Election results ==
=== 1952 ===
1952 Coorg Legislative Assembly election: Sanivarasanthe
Party	Candidate	Votes	%	±%
INC	P. K. Chennayya	4,321	43.73	New
INC	Kuttur Mallappa	4,202	42.53	New
Independent	B. Chikka	707	7.16	New
Independent	G. K. Venkataramaiah	650	6.58	New
Turnout		9880	63.1	New
