= Chief Minister of Coorg State =

Chief Minister of Coorg (Kodagu Mukhya Mantri)
- Appointer: President of India
- Inaugural holder: C. M. Poonacha
- Formation: 27 March 1952

The Chief Minister of Coorg was the chief executive of the south Indian state of Coorg State. As per the Constitution of India, Chief Commissioner was a state's de jure head (like governor) for a Part-C state like Coorg, but de facto executive authority rests with the chief minister. Following elections to the Coorg Legislative Assembly, the President of India invited the party with a majority of seats Indian National Congress to form the Government of Coorg. Then appointed the chief minister, whose council of ministers were collectively responsible to the assembly. Given that he had the confidence of the assembly, the chief minister's term is for five years and is subject to no term limits.

Coorg (highlighted in Dark Green) was a princely state from 1947 to 1956, which got merged to the modern state of Karnataka (within the blue border, which was earlier known as Mysore State till 1 November 1973) later composed of the erstwhile princely states of Mysore and Coorg, and the Kannada-speaking districts of the erstwhile states of Bombay, Hyderabad and Madras.

C M Poonacha was the only Chief Minister of Coorg from 1952 to 1956.

Coorg State was a Part-C state of India from 1950 to 1956. When the Constitution of India came into force on 26 January 1950, most of the existing provinces were reconstituted into states. Thus, Coorg Province became Coorg State. Coorg State was ruled by a Chief Commissioner with Mercara as its capital. The head of the government was the Chief Minister. Coorg State was abolished on 1 November 1956 as per the States Reorganisation Act, 1956 and its territory were merged with Mysore State (later renamed as Karnataka in 1973). Presently, Coorg forms a district of Karnataka state.

== History ==
The Coorg State came into being on 26 January 1950 as per the Constitution of India. Prior to the enactment of the Constitution, Coorg had been a province of the Dominion of India.

The first legislative elections in Coorg were held in 1952. The main contenders were the Indian National Congress led in the state by C. M. Poonacha and the Thakkadi Party led by the Gandhian Pandyanda Belliappa. While the Congress supported merger with the neighbouring Mysore State, the Thakkadi Party fought the election on an anti-merger plank. The Indian National Congress won a majority of 15 seats while the Thakkadi Party bagged the remaining nine seats.

== Commissioners of Coorg State ==
(1) Dewan Bahadur Ketolira Chengappa, became its first Chief Commissioner from 1947 to 1949

(2) C.T. Mudaliar became Chief Commissioner from 1949 - 1950

(3) Kanwar Baba Daya Singh Bedi, Chief Commissioner from 1950 - 1956

== Chief Minister of Coorg (Kodagu) ==
Colour key for parties
Indian National Congress

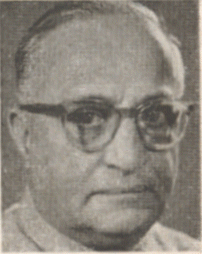
C M Poonacha, Only Chief Minister of Coorg (Kodagu)

No (Note: A number inside brackets indicates that the incumbent has previously held office.)	Name	Term (tenure length)	Assembly (election)	Party
Chief Minister of Coorg (Note: The Post of Chief Minister of Coorg came into being in March 1952 after Assembly election.)
1	Cheppudira Muthana Poonacha	27 March 1952 – 31 October 1956 (4 years, 218 days)	1952 election	Indian National Congress

=== Government of Coorg ===
Government was formed in Coorg by Indian National Congress, who won 15 of 24 seats. Cabinet was formed with two ministers (including Chief Minister), which lasted till States Reorganisation Act on 1 November 1956.

=== Cabinet ===
- Cheppudira Muthana Poonacha, who was the Chief Minister took the charge of Ministry of Finance for Coorg State.
- Kuttur Mallappa (elected to the assembly from the Sanivarsanthe constituency became the Home Minister of Coorg State

== Dissolution ==
As a result of the States Reorganisation Act of 1 November 1956, when India's state boundaries were reorganised, Coorg State became a district of the then Mysore State Mysore State was later renamed as Karnataka and part of the historical region of Coorg now forms the Kodagu district of Karnataka.

== Notes ==
Footnotes
