= Kuttur (Kodagu) =

Kuttur Kuttooru
- Village
- Location in Karnataka, India Kuttur (India)
- Coordinates: 12.6°N 75.87°E
- Country: India
- State: Karnataka
- District: Kodagu

Languages
  - Official: Kannada, Kodava
- Time zone: UTC+5:30 (IST)
- PIN: 571235
- ISO 3166 code: IN-KA
- Vehicle registration: KA-12
- Website: karnataka.gov.in

Kuttur is a small village in Somwarpet Taluk in Kodagu District of Karnataka State, India. It comes under Shanivarsanthe Hobli. It belongs to Mysore Division. It is located 12 km towards east from District headquarters Madikeri. 28 km from Somvarpet, 162 km from Mangalore and 234 km from State capital Bangalore.

Shanivarsanthe, Madikeri and Somwarpet are the nearby towns to Kuttur.

== People from Kuttur ==
- Kuttur Mallappa, former Minister for Home and MLA for Shanivarsanthe of Coorg (Kodagu) and later went on to become MLA Mercara of Mysore State

== See also ==
- Somwarpet
- Shanivarsanthe
- Kodagu
- Districts of Karnataka
