= Madikeri Town Assembly constituency =

Defunct constituency of the Mysore Legislative Assembly

Coordinates: 12.422857°N 75.738903°E

Mercara Town
- Former constituency for the State Legislative Assembly

Constituency details
- Country: India
- State: Mysore State (Coorg State till 31 October 1956)
- Established: 1951
- Abolished: 1957
- Reservation: None

Madikeri Town Assembly constituency (also known as Mercara Town) was a constituency of the Mysore Legislative Assembly (part of Coorg Legislative Assembly till 31 October 1956). The lone election to this constituency was conducted in 1952 to the legislature of the Coorg State (Kodagu) in India. The constituency included Madikeri. This seat was included to Mysore Legislative Assembly in 1956 during the reorganisation of the Indian States based along linguistic lines, the state of Coorg (Kodagu) was merged with Mysore State.

== Members of Legislative Assembly ==
Year	Member	Party
1952	B. S. Kushalappa	Indian National Congress
1957 onwards: Seat does not exist. See Madikeri

== Election results ==
=== 1952 ===
1952 Coorg Legislative Assembly election: Mercara Town
Party	Candidate	Votes	%	±%
INC	B. S. Kushalappa	1,208	48.42	New
Independent	B. K. Nanjundeshwara	542	21.72	New
Independent	N. R. Gopalakrishna	499	20.00	New
Independent	C. M. Thimmaya	246	9.86	New
Turnout		2,495	61.94	New
