= Somwarpet North Assembly constituency =

Defunct constituency of the Mysore Legislative Assembly

Coordinates: 12.598952°N 75.845840°E

Somwarpet North
- Former constituency for the State Legislative Assembly

Constituency details
- Country: India
- State: Mysore State (Coorg State till 31 October 1956)
- Established: 1951
- Abolished: 1957
- Reservation: None

Somwarpet North Assembly constituency was a constituency of the Mysore Legislative Assembly (part of Coorg Legislative Assembly till 31 October 1956). The lone election to this constituency was conducted in 1952 to the legislature of the Coorg State (Kodagu) in India. The constituency included Somwarpet. This seat was included to Mysore Legislative Assembly in 1956 during the reorganisation of the Indian States based along linguistic lines, the state of Coorg (Kodagu) was merged with Mysore State.

== Members of Legislative Assembly ==
Year	Member	Party
1952	C. K. Kalappa	Indian National Congress
1957 onwards: Seat does not exist. See Madikeri

== Election results ==
=== 1952 ===
1952 Coorg Legislative Assembly election: Somwarpet North
Party	Candidate	Votes	%	±%
INC	C. K. Kalappa	2,106	61.95	New
Independent	H. Chengappa	719	22.99	New
Independent	D. H. Dasappa	302	9.66	New
Turnout		3127	75.04	New
