= Suntikoppa Assembly constituency =

Defunct constituency of the Mysore Legislative Assembly

Coordinates: 12.452824°N 75.831117°E

Suntikoppa
- Former constituency for the State Legislative Assembly

Constituency details
- Country: India
- State: Mysore State (Coorg State till 31 October 1956)
- Established: 1951
- Abolished: 1957
- Reservation: None

Suntikoppa Assembly constituency was a constituency of the Mysore Legislative Assembly (part of Coorg Legislative Assembly till 31 October 1956). The lone election to this constituency was conducted in 1952 to the legislature of the Coorg State (Kodagu) in India. The constituency included Suntikoppa. This seat was included to Mysore Legislative Assembly in 1956 during the reorganisation of the Indian States based along linguistic lines, the state of Coorg (Kodagu) was merged with Mysore State.

== Members of Legislative Assembly ==
Year	Seat Number	Member	Party
1952	1	P. Lakha	Indian National Congress
1952	2	Gundugutti Manjanathaya	Indian National Congress
1957 onwards: Seat does not exist. See Periyapatna

== Election results ==
=== 1952 ===
1952 Coorg Legislative Assembly election: Sanivarasanthe
Party	Candidate	Votes	%	±%
INC	P. Lakha	2,834	35.84	New
INC	Gundugutti Manjanathaya	2,543	32.16	New
Independent	P. A. Chenagappa	1,338	16.92	New
Independent	Balagi Basuva	1,193	15.09	New
Turnout		4,940	68.10	New
Registered electors		7,254		
Majority		1,496		
INC win (new seat)				
Majority		1,205		
INC win (new seat)				
