= K. G. Bopaiah =

Indian politician

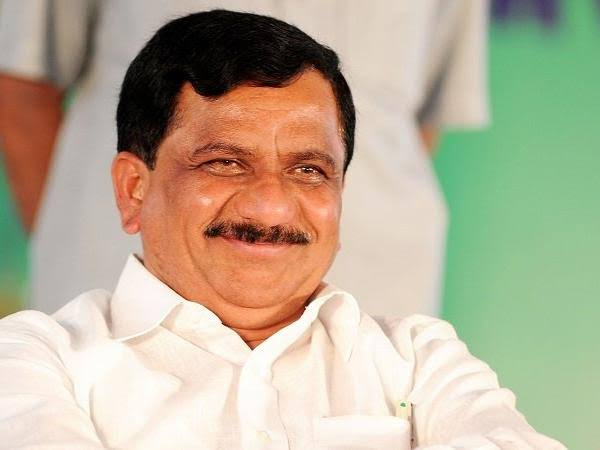

13th Speaker of the Karnataka Legislative Assembly
- In office 17 November 2009 – 17 May 2013
- Governor: Hansraj Bhardwaj
- Preceded by: Jagadish Shettar
- Succeeded by: Kagodu Thimmappa

Member of the Legislative Assembly
- In office May 2008 – May 2023
- Preceded by: H. D. Basavaraju
- Succeeded by: A. S. Ponnanna
- Constituency: Virajpet
- In office 2004–2007
- Preceded by: Mundanda M Nanaiah
- Succeeded by: Appachu Ranjan
- Constituency: Madikeri

Personal details
- Born: Kombarana Ganapathy Bopaiah; 17 October 1951 (age 74) Madikeri, Coorg State, India
- Party: Bharatiya Janata party
- Spouse: Kunthi
- Children: 2

Kombarana Ganapathy Bopaiah (born 17 October 1951) is an Indian politician who served as the Speaker of the Karnataka Legislative Assembly. He is affiliated with the Bharatiya Janata Party (BJP) and has been appointed the pro tem speaker of the Legislative Assembly by the Governor of Karnataka in 2018.

== Early life ==
K. G. Bopaiah was born into a Kodagu Gowda (Arebashe Gowda) family on 17 October 1951 at Kalur, a small village near Madikeri in Kodagu district. He received his primary education at the Kalur Government Primary School and later attended high school in Chettalli, Somwarpet taluk. In 1974, he earned his BSc degree from the then Government Senior College (now known as Field Marshal K.M. Cariappa College) in Somwarpet.

Following his undergraduate studies, Bopaiah pursued law at BMS College in Bangalore. He excelled in his legal studies and graduated as a gold medallist. In 1980, he returned to Madikeri and commenced his career as a practicing lawyer.

== Political career ==
He was closely associated with the Rashtriya Swayamsevak Sangh (RSS) and the Sangh Parivar since his childhood. Also, he was an active member of the Akhil Bharatiya Vidyarthi Parishad during his college days. He participated in the movement against the Kambadakada dam project in Kodagu proposed by the government in the 1970s. He was arrested during the Emergency in Bangalore and imprisoned along with thousands of other opposition activists.

He was appointed General Secretary of the Kodagu district unit of the BJP and elevated as its president in the 1990s. In 2004, he was elected as a MLA from Madikeri constituency as a BJP candidate. In 2008, he was re-elected again as a BJP candidate from Virajpet constituency after the de-limitation exercise reduced the number of seats in Kodagu district from three to two.

He served as pro tem Speaker after the BJP victory and administered oath of office to all the members of the Legislative Assembly. Later, he was unanimously elected as the Deputy Speaker of the Legislative Assembly. On 30 December 2009, he was elected as the Speaker of the Karnataka Legislative Assembly following the resignation of the previous speaker, Jagadish Shettar. The election of the Speaker, however, was held under chaotic circumstances as the Opposition parties wanted the elections to be postponed due to the death of the Kannada actor Vishnuvardhan. However, the government went ahead with the election process and K.G. Bopaiah was elected as Speaker, defeating the Opposition candidate, T.B. Jayachandra of the Indian National Congress. He was the first person from Kodagu district to become Speaker of the Karnataka Legislative Assembly.

He was elected as a member of the Karnataka Legislative Assembly and was chosen as the pro tem speaker by the Governor of Karnataka for the floor test held on 19 May 2018.

== Controversies ==
In October 2011, 11 disgruntled MLAs of the ruling BJP along with some independent MLAs revolted against the leadership of B.S. Yeddyurappa and submitted a letter to the Governor withdrawing their support to the BJP Government. In a controversial move, Speaker Bopaiah disqualified the rebel MLAs and thus played a major role in the survival of the BJP Government in Karnataka. Although his decision was upheld by the Karnataka High Court, it was overturned by the Supreme Court of India. The Supreme Court criticised the Speaker for the haste with which he had acted during the trust vote.
