= Kuttur Mallappa =

Indian politician

MLA in Mysore State
- In office 1957–1966
- Preceded by: Position created
- Succeeded by: A. P. Appanna
- Constituency: Mercara
- Majority: 5,092

Minister for Home Affairs, Coorg State
- In office 1952–1956
- Chief Minister: C. M. Poonacha
- Preceded by: Position created
- Succeeded by: Position abolished
- Constituency: Shanivarsanthe

MLA in Coorg (Kodagu)
- In office 27 March 1952 – 31 October 1956
- Preceded by: Position created
- Succeeded by: Position abolished
- Constituency: Shanivarsanthe

Personal details
- Born: Kuttur, Coorg Province, British India
- Died: 21 August 1966
- Occupation: Freedom fighter, politician
- Known for: Only home minister of Coorg (Kodagu)

Kuttur Mallappa was the only home minister of Coorg State from 1952 to 1956. He was a legislator representing Shanivarsanthe in Coorg Legislative Assembly from 1952–1957 and for Mercara from 1957 until his death in 1966.

== See also ==
- Government of Coorg
- C. M. Poonacha
- 1952 Coorg Legislative Assembly election
