= Attur, Virajpet =

Attur Atthur
- village
- Kodagu district
- Country: India
- State: Karnataka
- District: Kodagu
- Taluk: Virajpet

Government
  - Body: Village Panchayat

Languages
  - Official: Kannada, Kodava
- Time zone: UTC+5:30 (IST)
- PIN: 571253
- Vehicle registration: KA-12
- Nearest city: Madikeri
- Civic agency: Village Panchayat

Atthur is a small village near Gonikoppa in Virajpet Taluk of Kodagu District, Karnataka State, India. It comes under Guhya Panchayath. It belongs to Mysore Division. It is located 37 km (23 mi) towards South from District headquarters Madikeri and 240 km (150 mi) from State capital Bangalore.

Madikeri, Mattannur, Koothuparamba, Mangalore, Peringathur are the nearby cities to Atthur. It is located in the Virajpet taluk of Kodagu district in Karnataka.

== Institutes ==
- Fruit Research Station

== People from Attur ==
- C. M. Poonacha, The only Chief Minister of Coorg, before its merger with Mysore State.

== See also ==
- Kodagu
- Districts of Karnataka
