= Bhagamandala Nad Assembly constituency =

Defunct constituency of the Mysore Legislative Assembly

Coordinates: 12.387°N 75.529°E

Bhagamandala Nad
- Former constituency for the State Legislative Assembly

Constituency details
- Country: India
- State: Mysore State (Coorg State till 31 October 1956)
- Established: 1951
- Abolished: 1957
- Reservation: None

Bhagamandala Nad Assembly constituency was a constituency of the Mysore Legislative Assembly (part of Coorg Legislative Assembly till 31 October 1956). Lone election to this Constituency was conducted in 1952 to the legislature of the Coorg State (Kodagu) in India. The constituency included Bhagamandala. This seat was included to Mysore Legislative Assembly in 1956 during the reorganisation of the Indian States based along linguistic lines, the state of Coorg (Kodagu) was merged with Mysore State. The economy of the area was dominated by export of honey and cardamom. The constituency was abolished in 1956 (on paper) and remained operation till 1957.

== Members of Legislative Assembly ==
Year	Member	Party
1952	Konana Deviah	Indian National Congress
1957 onwards: Seat does not exist. See Madikeri

== Election results ==
=== 1952 ===
1952 Coorg Legislative Assembly election: Bhagamandala Nad
Party	Candidate	Votes	%	±%
INC	Konana Deviah	2,347	58.62	New
Independent	Pattamada Ponnappa	1,384	34.57	New
Independent	Jayaram Singh	273	6.82	New
Turnout		4,004	80.50	New
Registered electors		4,974		
INC win (new seat)				

With an electoral participation of 80.5% Bhagamandala Nad had one of the highest voter turnouts in the 1952 assembly elections in India.
