= Rudraguppe =

- village
- Location in Karnataka, India Rudraguppe (India)
- Coordinates: 12.144410°N 75.83422°E
- Country: India
- State: Karnataka
- District: Kodagu
- Talukas: Virajpet

Government
  - Body: Village Panchayat

Languages
  - Official: Kannada
- Time zone: UTC+5:30 (IST)
- Nearest city: Kodagu
- Civic agency: Village Panchayat

Rudraguppe is a village in the southern state of Karnataka, India. It is located in the Virajpet taluka of Kodagu district.

== See also ==
- Kodagu
- Districts of Karnataka
