= Channayan Kote =

- village
- Location in Karnataka, India Channayan Kote (India)
- Coordinates: 12.2718600°N 75.955930°E
- Country: India
- State: Karnataka
- District: Kodagu
- Talukas: Virajpet

Population (2001)
  - Total: 6,946

Languages
  - Official: Kannada
- Time zone: UTC+5:30 (IST)

Channayan Kote is a village in the southern state of Karnataka, India. It is located in the Virajpet taluk of Kodagu district.

== Demographics ==
As of 2001 India census, Channayan Kote had a population of 6946 with 3479 males and 3467 females.

== See also ==
- Kodagu
- Districts of Karnataka
