= Kushalnagar Assembly constituency =

Defunct constituency of the Mysore Legislative Assembly

Coordinates: 12.457663°N 75.960213°E

Fraserpet
- Former constituency for the State Legislative Assembly

Constituency details
- Country: India
- State: Mysore State (Coorg State till 31 October 1956)
- Established: 1951
- Abolished: 1957
- Reservation: None

Kushalnagar Assembly constituency (also known as Fraserpet) was a constituency of the Mysore Legislative Assembly (part of Coorg Legislative Assembly till 31 October 1956). The lone election to this constituency was conducted in 1952 to the legislature of the Coorg State (Kodagu) in India. The constituency included Kushalanagar. This seat was included to Mysore Legislative Assembly in 1956 during the reorganisation of the Indian States based along linguistic lines, the state of Coorg (Kodagu) was merged with Mysore State.

== Members of Legislative Assembly ==
| Year | Member | Party |
|---|---|---|
| 1952 | G. Lingarajayya | Indian National Congress |
1957 onwards: Seat does not exist. See Periyapatna

== Election results ==
=== 1952 ===
1952 Coorg Legislative Assembly election: Fraserpet
| Party | Candidate | Votes | % | ±% |
|---|---|---|---|---|
| INC | G. Lingarajayya | 2,375 | 71.64 | New |
| Independent | S. N. Ramashetty | 786 | 23.71 | New |
| Independent | B. C. Mallappa | 154 | 4.65 | New |
| Turnout | | 3315 | 77.11 | New |
