= M. C. Nanaiah =

India politician

Minister for Law and Parliamentary Affairs, Government of Karnataka
- In office 17 December 1994 – 10 August 1999

Minister for Rural Development and Panchayat Raj

Minister for Forests

Member of the Karnataka Legislative Council
- In office 1986–1998

Member of the Karnataka Legislative Assembly
- In office 28 February 1978 – 6 January 1983
- Preceded by: A. M. Bellaippa
- Succeeded by: M. M. Nanaiah
- Constituency: Madikeri

Personal details
- Born: 26 April 1939 (age 86)
- Party: Indian National Congress (2018–present)
- Other political affiliations: Janata Dal (Secular); All India Progressive Janata Dal; Janata Dal; Janata Party; Karnataka Kranti Ranga
- Spouse: Rupa
- Children: 2
- Occupation: Politician; lawyer

Meriyanda Chengappa Nanaiah (born 26 April 1939) is an Indian politician and lawyer from the State of Karnataka. He held as multiple portfolios during his career including the Ministry of Law and Parliamentary Affairs as part of Deve Gowda ministry between 1994 and 1996. Nanaiah has been politically active for over 30 years. He is five-time member of the Karnataka Legislative Council, and served once as the leader of the opposition in the Council. A book titled Nenapugalu Maasuva Munna (Before memories fade) (2005) has also been published by a journalist on Nanaiah's life.

== Biography ==
Nanaiah's career in public life began in the cooperative sector. In 1962, he was elected president of the Cardamom Cooperative Society, a hitherto powerful body, in Kodagu. He contested the 1967 Mysore election (now Karnataka) to the legislative assembly from Madikeri as an independent candidate, and lost to the Indian National Congress (INC) candidate A. P. Appanna. Between 1970 and 1974, he served as president of the Madikeri City Municipal Council, before contesting Madikeri again in the 1978 election as an INC candidate. He defeated A. K. Subbaiah and was elected to the Assembly. During this time, Nanaiah also practised as a lawyer handling both civil and criminal cases. In 1980, he was appointed chairman of the Karnataka State Cooperative Marketing Federation. In the 1980s, he quit the party to join the Karnataka Kranti Ranga and was elected to the Karnataka Legislative Council. The following year, he was elected as a full-member of the Council, now as member of the Janata Party.

In 1989, Nanaiah was appointed the leader of the opposition in the Council. He held the post till 1994. After joining the Janata Dal, Nanaiah held the cabinet portfolio of Law and Parliamentary Affairs in the Deve Gowda-led government starting 1994. He also served as Cabinet Minister of Forest, and of Rural Development and Panchayat Raj. Between 1994 and 1999, he served as Kodagu district in-charge for the Janata Dal. In 1999, he resigned as minister after his party decided to ally with the Bharatiya Janata Party.

In the early 2000s, Nanaiah joined the All India Progressive Janata Dal, and subsequently the Janata Dal (Secular). He rejoined the INC in 2018.

== Awards and recognition ==
- Ramakrishna Hegde award
