= Virajpet Nagar Panchayat =

Virajpet Town Panchayat ವಿರಾಜಪೇಟೆ ಪಟ್ಟಣ ಪಂಚಾಯತ್

Type
- Type: Town Municipal Council of Virajpet

History
- Founded: 1870; 155 years ago
- Preceded by: Virajpet Mandal Panchayat

Leadership
- President: Sushmitha T. R.
- Vice-President: Vinank Kuttappa

Structure
- Seats: 18
- Length of term: 5 years

Elections
- Voting system: First-past-the-post

Meeting place
- Virajpete Town Panchayat Office

Website
- virajpettown.mrc.gov.in

The Virajpet Town Panchayat is a town panchayat that is in charge of the civic and infrastructural assets of Virajpet, a town in the district of Kodagu in the Indian State of Karnataka. It administers an area of 8.26 km^{2} (3.19 sq mi). The legislative body consists of 18 representatives called councillors, one from each of the 18 wards of the town. It is headed by a president.

== History ==
A 'Municipal Committee' was first constituted for the town of Virajpet, then known as Virarajendrapet, in 1870, following the Viceroy Lord Mayo's Resolution that envisaged decentralization of power to bring about administrative efficiency in meeting the demands of people and to add to the finances of colonial regime. It was to have nine members, all nominated by the government, three of whom were ex-officio members from the government and the remaining were influential residents representing different classes and religious groups. The ex-officio members were the town's assistant superintendent, assistant engineer and the local subedar. The powers to nominate the members were given to the Chief Commissioner of Coorg in 1916. The enactment of Coorg Municipal Regulation (II of 1907) gave authority to the municipal committees of Coorg to frame regulations, and increases their finances and carry out administration efficiently. In 1925, provisions were made to elect a president to the committee from among the non-official members.

In an independent India, Virajpet was a part of the erstwhile Coorg State. In 1956, it became a part of Mysore State after the enactment of the States Reorganisation Act. It was given the status of a municipality in accordance to the Karnataka Municipalities Act, 1964. In accordance to the provisions of the Act, the first elections were held in 1967 to elect 18 councillors, one each from 18 wards. Universal suffrage had been introduced in India for the general election of 1951–52. In 1986, in accordance to the Karnataka Zilla Panchayat, Taluk Panchayat Samithis, Mandal Panchayats and Nyaya Panchayats Act, 1985, Virajpet was constituted as a panchayat at the inter-mediate level, the mandal panchayat. Election to the council of the newly constituted panchayat was held for the first time in April 1990.

== Finances ==
Octroi and grants from the State government were the main sources of finance for the municipality, apart from revenue from the town's taxpayers. In 1979, octroi on marketable commodities was abolished which resulted in considerable reduction in revenues for the municipality. In the same year, the government introduced a provision wherein octroi grant was released to the municipalities of the State. Income for the municipality rose from ₹2,908 in 1873–74 to ₹151,069 in 1960–61. Expenditures for the same were ₹1,689 and ₹166,295. They stood at over ₹30 lakh in 1992–93. For 2019–20, the income stood at ₹5.89 crore and expenditure at ₹4.3 crore, with a surplus of approximately ₹1.59 crore.

== See also ==
- Local self-government in India
