= A. S. Ponnanna =

Indian politician

A. S. Ponnanna (born 1975) is an Indian politician from Karnataka. He is a member of the Karnataka Legislative Assembly from Virajpet Assembly constituency in Kodagu district. He represents Indian National Congress Party and won the 2023 Karnataka Legislative Assembly election.

== Early life and education ==
Ponnanna is from Virajpet, Kodagu district. He is an advocate. HIs late father was A. K. Subbaiah. He did his B.A. and then completed his LLB in 1987 from University Law College, Bengaluru University. He married a teacher.

== Career ==
Ponnanna won the 2023 Karnataka Legislative Assembly election from Virajpet Assembly constituency representing Indian National Congress. He polled 83,791 votes and defeated his nearest rival, K. G. Bopaiah of Bharatiya Janata Party, by a narrow margin of 4291 votes.

In August 2026, A.S. Ponnanna was appointed as the nominee for Deputy Speaker of the Karnataka Assembly. However, later on 13th August, he was appointed as the Political Secretary to the Chief Minister with Cabinet rank. The move comes after Ponnanna was overlooked for a ministerial position in the recent Cabinet expansion.
