= Appachu Ranjan =

Indian politician

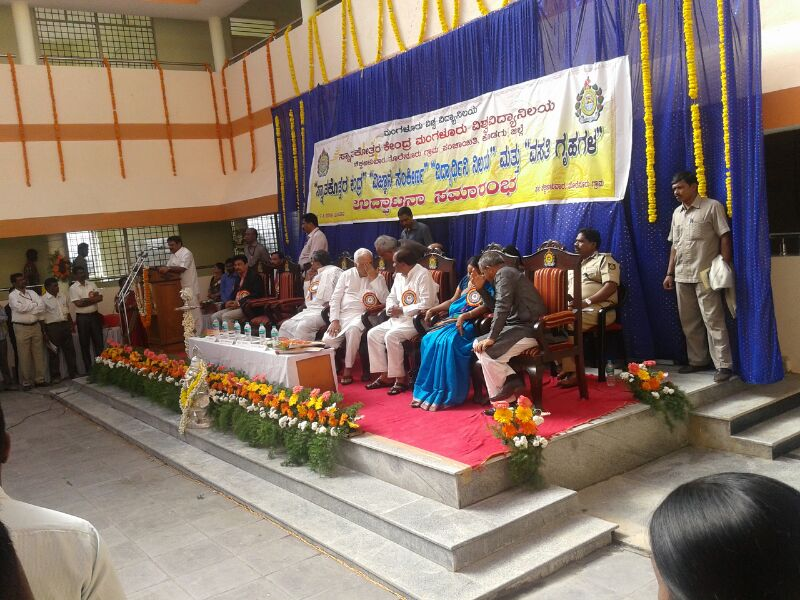
- Appachu Ranjan as guest speaker

Minister for Youth Services and Sports, Government of Karnataka
- In office 12 July 2012 – 8 May 2013

Member of Legislative Assembly
- In office May 2008 – May 2023
- Succeeded by: Mantar Gowda
- Constituency: Madikeri
- In office 1994–2004
- Succeeded by: B. A. Jivijaya
- Constituency: Somvarpet

Personal details
- Born: 11 September 1957 (age 69) Virajpet, Kodagu, Mysore State, (now Karnataka, India)
- Party: Bhartiya Janata Party (1980–present)

Mandepanda Poovaiah Appachu Ranjan (born 11 September 1957) is an Indian politician who was the former Minister for Youth Services and Sports in Karnataka, a state in Southern India. He is a leader of the BJP in Karnataka and a fifth time Member of the Karnataka Legislative Assembly from Madikeri Constituency in the Kodagu district, Karnataka. He belongs to the Kodava Hindu community.

== Personal life ==
Appachu Ranjan was born on 11 September 1957 in a village called Chembebellur in Virajpet Taluk of Kodagu district. His parents were Poovaiah and Kamavva of the Mandepanda family. He completed his pre-university education and Bachelor of Arts from Vivekananda College, Puttur. He is married to Shyla Appachu and has two sons and a daughter. Ranjan was the member of college hockey and football teams. In 1997, he won the best sportsman award in a sports tourney organised for South Indian MLAs.

== Political career ==
He entered politics in the year of 1978 as a member of the then Janatha Party and after being active in public life as the member of the Kumbur School Development Management Committee, president of the Madapur VSSSN, correspondent of the Chennamma Junior College in Madapur, director of the Kodagu District Coffee Growers Society in Madikeri, member of the Kushalnagar APMC, he was formally elected as a mandal panchayat member. He held various posts over the years amassing immense experience in the field of managing Co-operative and Agricultural organizations.

Ranjan's major foray into politics came in 1980 when he was elected president of the BJP youth wing in Madapur. He occupied the post of the Somwarpet taluk BJP president from 1986 to 1991 and later served as the president of the Kodagu BJP unit from 1991 to 1995. It was during his tenure that the BJP stormed the Congress bastion in Kodagu to win all three Assembly segments, others being D.S. Madappa (Madikeri) and H.D. Basavaraj (Virajpet). Somvarpet constituency was done away with during the delimitation after which Kodagu was reduced to Madikeri and Virajpet constituencies.

Mr. Ranjan won the Assembly elections for the first time from Somvarpet in 1994 serving till 1999. He won again for the second time from the same constituency in 1999 to stay till 2004. However, he lost to B.A. Jivijaya of the Congress (now with JD(S)) in the next election (2004). Mr. Ranjan came back in the 2008 elections winning from Madikeri constituency. He once again retained the seat by a margin of 4629 votes in 2012 despite an Anti-Incumbency wave against the BJP in the state. He retained the seat again in 2018 by winning by a margin of 16015 votes. Thus he has been elected five times as MLA, thrice from Madikeri and twice from Somvarpet.

He became known by being the chairman of the Privilege Committee and Petition Committee of the legislature. He served as the chairman of the Karnataka State Sports Authority in 2008 as also Karnataka Land Army Corporation Limited in the same year. Ranjan is a member of the State BJP Executive Committee and was in charge of Mysore division. In 2012, he was inducted as Cabinet Minister for Youth Services and Sports in Jagadish Shettar’s cabinet and was made the District in-charge minister of Kodagu District. He became the first M.L.A. of Karnataka to stay in forest-covered areas and remote villages to understand and try to solve the issues of people living in highly backward regions. He stayed in Balegundi ST Colony, Taluk SC Colony ChikkaBandara, and in a remote village in Kothnalli.

== Appachu Ranjan Committee ==
He headed the joint house committee to probe into the ruckus created by some of the Opposition members during the trust vote of the BJP government on 11 October 2010 which was set up by the then House Speaker K.G.Bopaiah. In its 287-page report tabled in the House, the panel headed by him recommended suspension of Rahim Khan, Kakaso Panduranga Patil, U T Khader, N A Haris, (all Congress) B Z Zameer Ahmed Khan, H C Balakrishna, C S Puttaraju, M T Krishnappa (all JD-S) for one year. It recommended suspension of B K Sangamesh, Suresh Gowda, P M Ashok, H P Manjunath, (all Congress), Bandeppa Kashempur, K Raju and K P Bache Gowda (all JD-S) for six months. It was a recommendation that created a standoff in the Assembly.

== Minister for Youth Services and Sports and District in-charge of Kodagu ==
He was inducted into Jagadish Shettar's cabinet as Minister for Youth Services and Sports on 12 July 2012. He was a core member in drafting the Youth policy and recommending the Sports policy. Vivekananda Youth Policy was unveiled for the first time and various youth retreat centers were established. As Sports Minister, Karnataka's highest sportsperson award "the Ekalayva award" was changed to be given on the basis of marks and merit rather than recommendation. As District Incharge Minister of Kodagu, his top priority was in Health, Education, Road & Transports, House for the Homeless and Environment. During his tenure, Government permissions were given to Engineering College in Kushalnagar, Sainik School in Kudige, Mangalore University Branch in Aluvara, Kushalnagar, and a Medical College was recommended as well.
