= Badagabanangala =

Badagabanangala hundi
- village
- Country: India
- State: Karnataka
- District: Kodagu
- Talukas: Virajpet

Population (2001)
  - Total: 5,326

Languages
  - Official: Kannada
- Time zone: UTC+5:30 (IST)

Badagabanangala is a village in the southern state of Karnataka, India. It is located in the Virajpet taluk of Kodagu district in Karnataka.

== Demographics ==
As of 2001 India census, Badagabanangala had a population of 5326 with 2611 males and 2715 females.

== See also ==
- Kodagu
- Districts of Karnataka
- Madikeri
- Mangalore
