= Mantar Gowda =

Indian politician (born 1985)

Member of the Karnataka Legislative Assembly
- Incumbent
- Assumed office 2023
- Chief Minister: Siddaramaiah
- Preceded by: Appachu Ranjan
- Constituency: Madikeri

Personal details
- Born: 8 November 1985 (age 40) Balagunda, Somawarpet taluk, Kodagu district, Karnataka, India
- Party: INC
- Children: 3
- Education: KIMS, Bengaluru (MD, MBBS)
- Occupation: Radiologist; Politician
- Website: mantargowda.com

Mantar Gowda (born 8th November 1985) is an Indian politician from Karnataka. He is a member of the Karnataka Legislative Assembly from Madikeri Assembly constituency in Kodagu district. He represents Indian National Congress Party and won the 2023 Karnataka Legislative Assembly election.

== Early life and education ==
Mantar Gowda is from Arakalgud, Hassan district. He is the son of A. Manju, the JD (S) candidate who won from Arkalgud Assembly seat in Hassan. He is the grandson of Sakamma, a philanthropist from Somwarpet. He resides in his ancestral home in Somwarpet. He married Divya, daughter of Narain, alias Madeyanda Narendra and Yashoda Bopanna, who served as Director of Karnataka SSLC Board. He completed his M.D. in radiology.

== Career ==
Mantar Gowda won the 2023 Karnataka Legislative Assembly election from Madikeri Assembly constituency representing Indian National Congress. He polled 84,879 votes and defeated his nearest rival and five time MLA, Appachu Ranjan of Bharatiya Janata Party by a margin of 4,413 votes. He lost the election for legislative council for local bodies in 2021 on Congress ticket.
