= N. N. Wanchoo =

Niranjan Nath Wanchoo OBE ICS
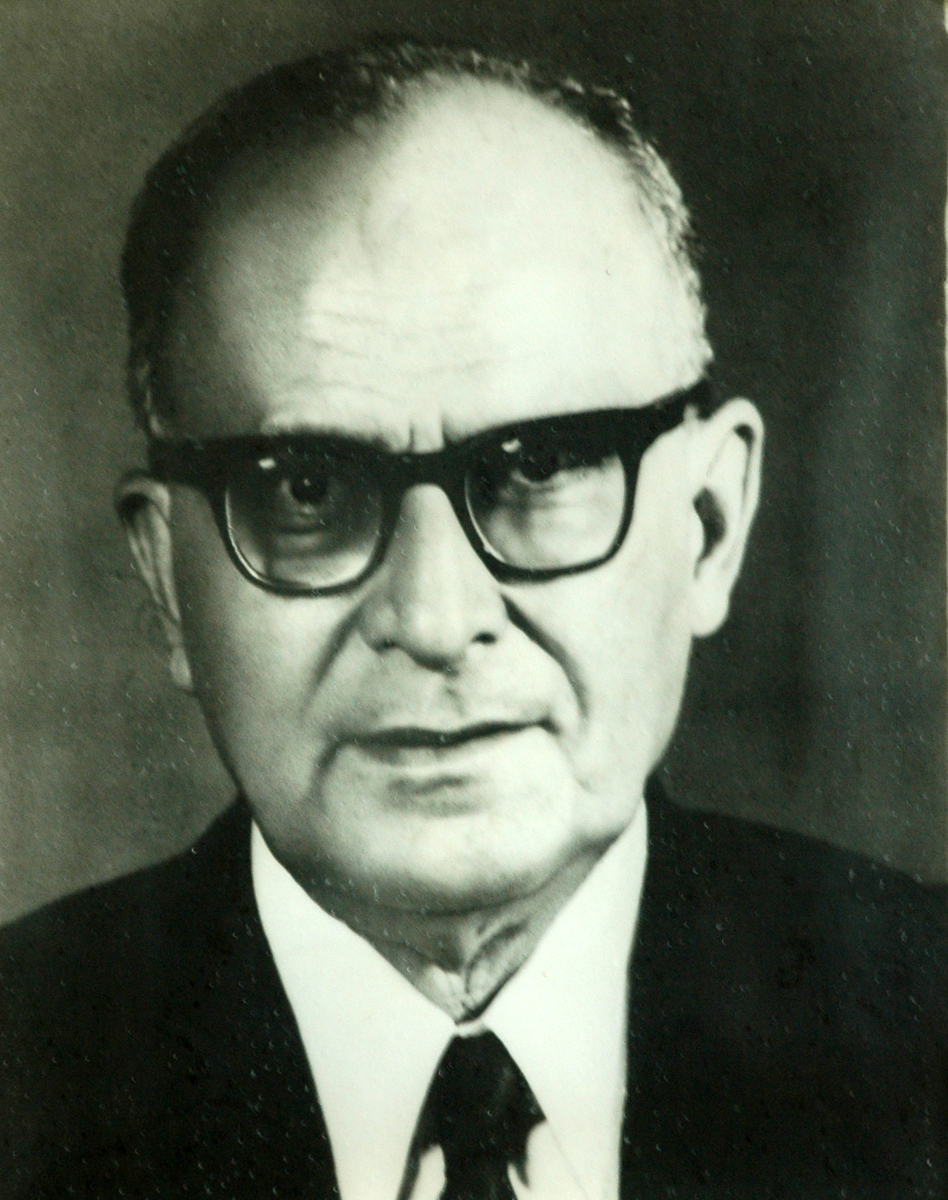

5th Governor of Madhya Pradesh
- In office 14 October 1977 – 17 August 1978
- Chief Minister: Kailash Chandra Joshi; Virendra Kumar Sakhlecha
- Preceded by: Satya Narayan Sinha
- Succeeded by: C. M. Poonacha

6th Governor of Kerala
- In office 1 April 1973 – 10 October 1977
- Chief Minister: C. Achutha Menon; K. Karunakaran; A. K. Antony
- Preceded by: V. Viswanathan
- Succeeded by: Jothi Venkatachalam

Personal details
- Born: 1 May 1910 Satna, British India
- Died: 20 October 1982 (aged 72)
- Citizenship: India
- Education: Government College, Lahore
- Alma mater: King's College, Cambridge
- Occupation: Politician

Niranjan Nath Wanchoo (also spelt Wanchu) OBE, ICS (1 May 1910 – 20 October 1982) was a senior civil servant and later, Governor of the states of Kerala and Madhya Pradesh in India. His primary education was in Nowgong, Madhya Pradesh (1916-July 1920). He was educated at the Government College, Lahore and King's College, Cambridge and the Royal College of Defence Studies, UK.

== Civil servant ==
He was selected to the Indian Civil Service in 1934 and began his career as a Sub-Collector in Bihar. Over the course of his career, he served, in among other posts, as Joint Secretary in the Ministry of Defence and Chief Controller of defence production (1948–57), Secretary to Government of India, Department of Expenditure, Ministry of Finance (1960–61), Chairman of the Bokaro Steel plant (1965–70) and Secretary to the Government of India, Department of Industrial Development (1968–70). He was also a member of Court of Governors of the Administrative Staff College of India, Hyderabad. He retired as Chairman, Industrial Customs and Prices Bureau in 1972.

== Governor ==
He served as the Governor of Kerala from 1 April 1973 to 10 October 1977 – with C. Achutha Menon, K. Karunakaran and A. K. Antony as Chief Ministers and then as Governor of Madhya Pradesh from 14 October 1977 to 16 August 1978 with Kailash Chandra Joshi and Virendra Kumar Sakhlecha as Chief Ministers.

== Other roles ==
The Planning Commission appointed him the head of a committee to look into industrial development for the backward areas in India and to recommend fiscal and financial incentives for industries in these areas. The Wanchoo Committee recommended that a few areas be selected and fiscal and financial resources be spent to develop these into growth poles rather than spread out resources thinly but uniformly across all backward areas He was also Chairman of Delhi Urban Art Commission in 1982. He died on 20 October 1982.

Preceded by S. N. Sinha	Governor of Madhya Pradesh; 8 March 1971 – 13 October 1977	Succeeded by Cheppudira Muthanna Poonacha
