= Dodda Vira Rajendra =

- Raja of Coorg

Raja of Coorg
- Reign: 1780–1809
- Predecessor: Linga Raja I
- Successor: Devammaji (as Rani)
- Died: 1809
- Burial: Mercara (Madikeri)
- Spouse: Mahadevamma
- Father: Linga Raja - I
- Religion: Hinduism

Dodda Vira Rajendra was the ruler of the Kingdom of Coorg from 1780 to 1809. He freed the kingdom from the occupation of Tipu Sultan, the king of Mysore. He later aided the British in their fight against Tipu Sultan. Dodda Veera raja constructed the city of Vira-rajendrapete, today known as Virajapet.

== Early life and exile ==
Not much is known of Dodda Vira Rajendra's childhood. In 1780, Linga Raja, his father and ruler of the Coorg Kingdom died while Dodda Vira Rajendra was still young. Hyder Ali, the king of Mysore saw this as an opportunity and took possession of the Coorg Kingdom until, as he said "the princes (Dodda Vira Rajendra and his brother) would come of age". In September 1782, the princes were deported to Garuru. Enraged at the deportation of their princes, the Coorgs revolted and proclaimed independence. Soon after in December 1782, Hyder Ali died due to a cancerous growth in his back and his son Tipu became the King. Tipu dispatched the Coorg royal family to Periyapatna and proceeded to annex Coorg and other areas. In December 1788, Dodda Vira Rajendra escaped from Periyapatna and by 1790 had regained power in Coorg.

== Battles against the Kingdom of Mysore ==
Dodda Vira Rajendra ousted the occupying army of Mysore from Bisle Ghat to Manantody and led plundering expeditions into the territories of the Mysore Kingdom. In retaliation, Tipu Sultan sent armies against him, led by Tipu Sultan's Generals Golam Ali and Buran-ud-Din, but were defeated by Dodda Vira Rajendra. In June 1789, he sacked and burnt the fort of Kushalanagar and in August he destroyed the fort of Beppunad. This was followed by the capture of the fort of Bhagamandala. Thereafter, he captured Amara Sulya.

Noticing the successes of Dodda Vira Rajendra, the Government of the British East India Company offered him an alliance against Tipu Sultan in October 1790. Faced with a powerful opponent in the Kingdom of Mysore, Dodda Vira Rajendra accepted the offer and allied with the British. In the same year, he recaptured the Bhagamandal fort which was captured by Tipu in 1785 and forcibly converted the Kodavu captives into Islam.

Alarmed, Tipu dispatched another army led by General Khadar Khan, which was also defeated. Thereafter, the fort of Mercara capitulated to Dodda Vira Rajendra without a fight.

Dodda Vira Rajendra allowed the British Bombay Army to pass through Coorg, on its way to Srirangapatna, Tipu Sultan's capital. He also aided the British in their fight against Tipu Sultan, until the latter's death on 4 May 1799.

== Death ==
Dodda Vira Rajendra died in 1809. His tomb is located in Mercara (Madikeri). He is deified and his tomb is worshipped to this day.

== Works ==
Dodda Vira Rajendra compiled a literary work Rajendraname, which records the history of the Coorg rulers from 1633 to 1807.

He established the town of Virajpet in 1792.

He also built a street called Mahadevpet in Madikeri town.
