= C. M. Poonacha =

Indian politician

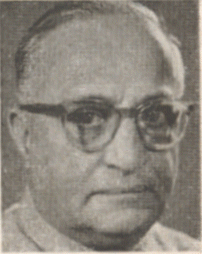

13th Governor of Odisha
- In office 1 September 1982 – 17 August 1983
- Chief Minister: Janaki Ballabh Patnaik
- Preceded by: Ranganath Misra (Acting)
- Succeeded by: Bishambhar Nath Pande
- In office 4 November 1980 – 24 June 1982
- Chief Minister: Janaki Ballabh Patnaik
- Preceded by: S. K. Ray (Acting)
- Succeeded by: Ranganath Misra (Acting)
- In office 30 April 1980 – 30 September 1980
- Chief Minister: Janaki Ballabh Patnaik
- Preceded by: B. D. Sharma
- Succeeded by: S. K. Ray (Acting)

6th Governor of Madhya Pradesh
- In office 17 August 1978 – 29 April 1980
- Chief Minister: Virendra Kumar Sakhlecha; Sunder Lal Patwa
- Preceded by: N. N. Wanchoo
- Succeeded by: B. D. Sharma

8th Minister of Railways
- In office 30 March 1967 – 14 February 1969
- Prime Minister: Indira Gandhi
- Preceded by: S. K. Patil
- Succeeded by: Ram Subhag Singh

Chief Minister of Coorg
- In office 27 March 1952 – 31 October 1956
- Chief Commissioner: Daya Singh Bedi
- Preceded by: Office Established
- Succeeded by: Office Abolished

Minister for Steel and Heavy Engineering
- In office 15 February 1969 – 17 March 1971
- Constituency: Mangalore

MoS for Transport, Aviation, Shipping and Tourism
- In office January 25, 1966-March 12, 1967
- Constituency: Mysore State, Rajya Sabha

MoS for Finance
- In office 1 January 1966-24 January 1966
- Constituency: Mysore State, Rajya Sabha

Minister for Home, Mysore State
- In office 1957-1962
- Constituency: Virajpet

Minister for Commerce and Industries, Mysore State
- In office 1956-1962
- Constituency: Virajpet

Minister for Finance, Coorg (Kodagu)
- In office 1952-1956
- Constituency: Berriathnad

Member of the Indian Parliament for Mangalore
- In office 1967–1971
- Preceded by: Adhur Shanker Alva
- Succeeded by: K. K. Shetty
- Majority: 28522

Member of the Indian Parliament for Mysore State, Rajya Sabha
- In office 3 April 1964-25 February 1967
- Succeeded by: T. Siddalingaya

MLA in Coorg (Kodagu)
- In office 1952 - 1957
- Preceded by: Position Created
- Succeeded by: Position Abolished
- Constituency: Berriathnad
- Majority: 1179

MLA in Mysore State
- In office 1957-1962
- Preceded by: Position Created
- Succeeded by: A. P. Appanna
- Constituency: Virajpet
- Majority: 3221

Personal details
- Born: Cheppudira Muthanna Poonacha; 26 September 1910 Attur, Coorg Province, British India
- Died: 7 August 1990 (aged 79)
- Party: Indian National Congress
- Children: 4, including C. P. Belliappa & Kavery Nambisan
- Occupation: Freedom Fighter, Politician
- Known for: Only Chief Minister of Coorg (Kodagu)

Cheppudira Muthana Poonacha was the Chief Minister of Coorg, Minister in Mysore State, Member of Parliament (Rajya Sabha and Lok Sabha), Union Railway Minister of India and Governor of Madhya Pradesh and Governor of Orissa.

== Freedom Movement ==
C. M. Poonacha was a descendant of the Coorg Dewans. During the Freedom Movement he was sentenced to imprisonment twice during the Salt Satyagraha in 1932 and 1933. He was again imprisoned in 1940–41 and in 1942–44. He became a member of All-India Congress Committee in 1938. Also, in 1938 he was elected to Coorg District Board, became its president in 1941 and in 1945 he was elected to Coorg Legislative Council. From 1945 to 1951 he was leader of the Congress Legislative Party in the council. He hence became a prominent member of the Indian National Congress party in Coorg.

== Politics ==
In 1947 Coorg was a separate state in South India until 1956. The other states of South India at that time were Bombay Presidency, Madras Presidency, Mysore kingdom, Travancore kingdom, Cochin kingdom and Hyderabad kingdom. The Coorg State Assembly had a strength of 24 members and the Cabinet consisted of just two members.

=== Constituent Assembly Member (Constitution of India) ===
C. M. Poonacha represented the Coorg state as a member of the Constituent Assembly.

=== Chief Minister (Coorg) ===
Two parties fought the 1952 state elections: the Takkadi ('Scales of Justice') party under veteran Gandhian Pandyanda Belliappa, who was a dominant political force and voice of Coorg with its anti-merger plank, and the Congress under C.M. Poonacha in Coorg. Poonacha was elected Chief Minister of Coorg State (1952–56) in the first general elections. Coorg had two MPs in the Union Parliament then, besides having a state legislative body. In 1956 the State Reorganisation Act was passed. Coorg was merged with Mysore and the legislative body at Mercara dissolved. While the Chief Minister was C.M. Poonacha, (who also held the finance portfolio), the only other Minister was Home Minister, Kittur Mallappa. C.M. Poonacha had won the Beriathnad seat while K. Mallappa won the second seat from Sanivarasante. The Congress won 15 seats and Independents (opposing merger), represented by the Thakkadi Party, won nine seats. Under various circumstances Coorg was merged with the then Mysore in 1956.

=== State Minister (Mysore) ===
After the formation of the new Mysore State Poonacha was Minister for Home and Industries under its Chief Minister S. Nijalingappa. He was also chairman, State Trading Corporation of India from 1959 to 1963. He led the Government of India Trade delegation to some East European countries in 1960 and was the leader of the State Trading Corporation delegation to Japan in 1961.

=== Central Minister ===
Poonacha was elected to the Rajya Sabha in April 1964. Later Poonacha was made Union Minister without portfolio in Pandit Jawaharlal Nehru's cabinet. From 1 to 24 January 1966, he was Minister of State in the Ministry of Finance and from 25 January 1966 to 12 March 1967 Minister of State in the Ministry of Transport, Aviation, Shipping and Tourism. He contested and won the Lok Sabha seat for the Mangalore constituency in 1969. He contested again in 1971 as a candidate of NCO party, but lost.

=== Union Railway Minister ===
After some time he became Union Minister for Railways from 1967 to 1969 (at first interim and then final) and Minister for Steel and Heavy Engineering in 1969. At that time he was the Member of Parliament representing Mangalore Lok Sabha constituency to which Coorg then belonged.

== Retirement ==
=== Governor ===
After his retirement from active politics, he served two terms as governor, once as Governor of Madhya Pradesh taking charge on 17 August 1978 and later as Governor of Orissa on 30 April 1980.

== Family ==
Poonacha has two sons and two daughters. Two of his children, C. P. Belliappa and Kavery Nambisan, are well-known writers in English.

== See also ==
- List of governors of Odisha
- Governors of Madhya Pradesh
- Kuttur Mallappa

Preceded by N. N. Wanchu	Governor of Madhya Pradesh; 17 August 1978 - 29 April 1980	Succeeded by B. D. Sharma

Preceded by Bhagwat Dayal Sharma (first term); Justice S.K. Ray (second term); R.N. Mishra (third term)	Governor of Odisha; Apr 1980– Sep 1980 (first term); Nov 1980 – Jun 1982 (second term); Sep 1982 – Aug 1983 (third term)	Succeeded by Justice S.K. Ray (first term); R. N. Mishra (second term); Bishambhar Nath Pande(third term)
