= Coorg Legislative Assembly =

Legislative body for former Indian state

The Coorg Legislative Assembly was a legislative body which introduced laws for Coorg State from 1950 to 1956. It had its origins in the Coorg Legislative Council established on 26 January 1924 as a representative body of the Chief Commissioner's province of Coorg. When the Constitution of India came into force on 26 January 1950, the name of the body was officially changed to Coorg Legislative Assembly. The first and only general election to the assembly took place in 1952. It was eventually dissolved in 1956 when Coorg State was merged with the neighbouring Mysore State.

== History ==
The Coorg Legislative Council was formed on 28 January 1924 as a representative body for the inhabitants of Coorg Province. It initially consisted of twenty members, fifteen of whom were elected and five nominated. The franchise was enlarged by the Government of India Act 1935 and the Indian Independence Act, 1947. In 1947, the number of members was reduced by two when the European constituency was abolished.

The Constitution of India replaced the legislative council with a legislative assembly consisting of 24 members from 18 constituencies, of which six were two-member constituencies and twelve were single-member constituencies. Coming into force on 26 January 1950, one election was held to the assembly, in 1952.

== Members of the Coorg Legislative Assembly, 1952 ==
Candidates of only two political parties Indian National Congress (INC) and Communist Party of India (CPI) contested the elections. Thakkadi Party candidates contested as Independents such as the independence activist Pandyanda Belliappa (elected from Ammathi Nad Constituency).

No.	Constituency	MLA	Party
1	Sanivarasanthe	P. K. Chennayya	Indian National Congress
1	Sanivarasanthe	K. Mallappa	Indian National Congress
2	Somwarpet North	C. K. Kalappa	Indian National Congress
3	Somwarpet South	H. T. Muthanna	Independent politician
4	Fraserpet	G. Lingarajayya	Indian National Congress
5	Sunticoppa	Gundugutti Manjanathaya	Indian National Congress
5	Sunticoppa	P. Lakha	Indian National Congress
6	Mercara Town	B. S. Kushalappa	Indian National Congress
7	Murnad	C. A. Mandanna	Indian National Congress
8	Mercara Nad	P. D. Subbaiah	Indian National Congress
9	Srimangala Nad	K. P. Karumbayya	Independent politician
9	Srimangala Nad	G. Subbaiah	Independent politician
10	Hudikeri	K. K. Ganapathy	Independent politician
11	Berriath Nad	C. M. Poonacha	Indian National Congress
12	Ponnampet Nad	Yeravara Belli	Indian National Congress
12	Ponnampet Nad	P. Nanamaya	Indian National Congress
13	Virajpet Town	N. G. Ahamed	Independent politician
14	Virajpet Nad	Harijan Nanja	Independent politician
14	Virajpet Nad	P. C. Uthayya	Independent politician
15	Ammathi Nad	Pandyanda Belliappa	Independent politician
16	Siddapur	Bettakurubara Kala	Indian National Congress
16	Siddapur	Muruvanda Machaiah	Indian National Congress
17	Napoklu Nad	A. C. Thimmaiah	Independent politician
18	Bhagamandala Nad	Konana Devaiah	Indian National Congress
