= Harihara, Kodagu =

Harihara is a small village in Virajpet Taluk in Kodagu district in Karnataka State, India. Piriyapatna, Madikeri, Iritty, Peravoor, Gonikoppa, Virajpet, Manandavaadi are the nearby towns to Harihara.

== Access ==
Harihara is reachable by Krishanrajanaga Railway Station, Mysore railway station, Mangalore Railway Station, Cannanore South Railway Station, Etakkot Railway Station, Tellicherry Railway Station. Its main village panchayat is Harihara Panchayat.
