= A. K. Subbaiah =

Indian leader and lawyer (1934–2019)

Shri Ajjikuttira Kariappa Subbaiah (A.K.Subbaiah)
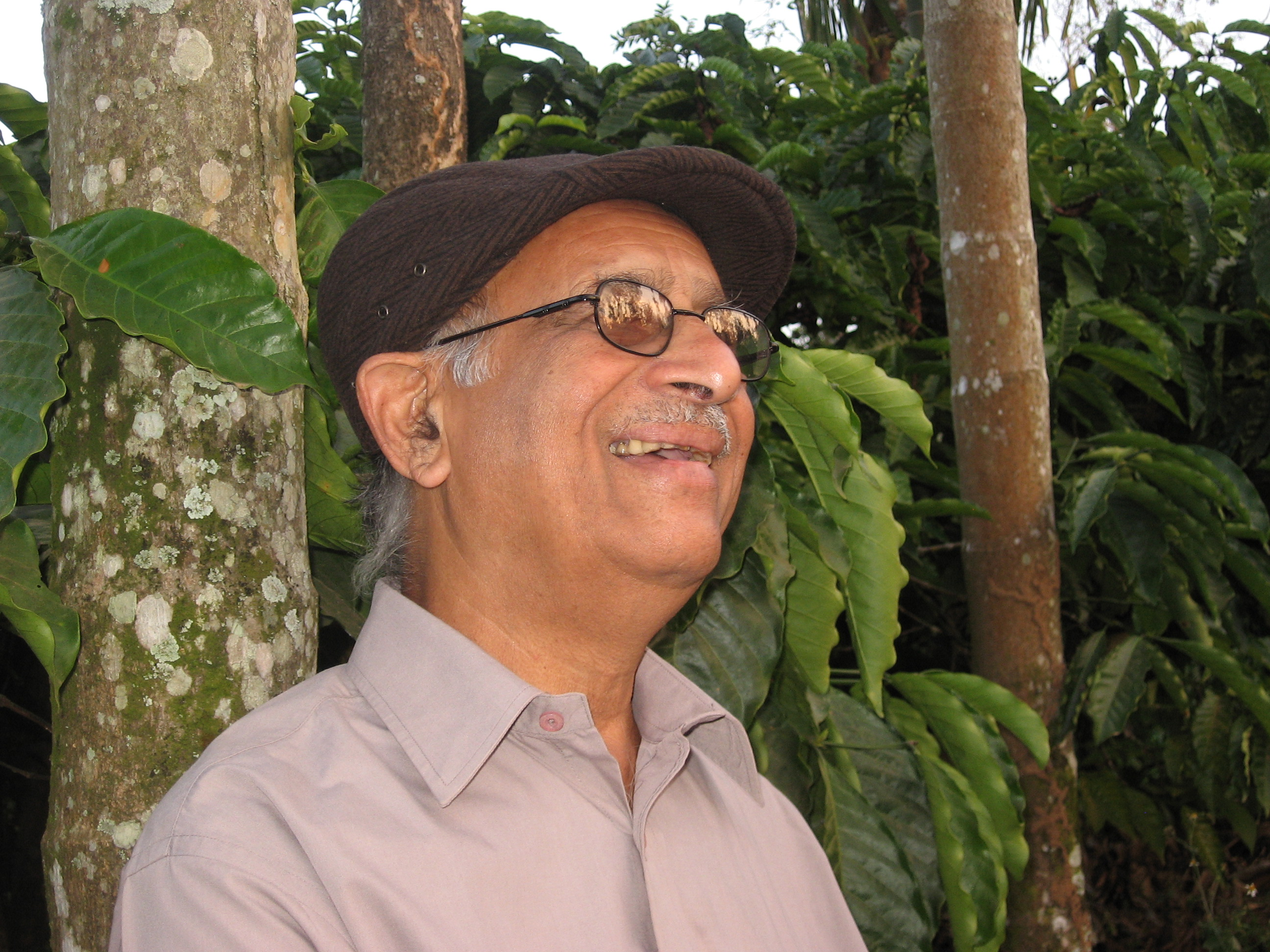
- Born: 9 August 1934; Konageri Village, Virajpet Taluk, British-ruled India
- Died: 27 August 2019 (aged 85); Bangalore, Karnataka, India
- Monuments: Memorial at Kalgundi Estate in Coorg
- Education: Sharada Vilas Law College Mysore 1963
- Occupations: Lawyer; Politician; Activist; Writer; Farmer
- Known for: Anti Corruption Movement, Social Justice
- Notable work: RSS Antharanga and other works in Kannada
- Office: Leader of Opposition in Karnataka Legislative Council, Member of Legislative Council of Karnataka
- Spouse: Dotty Ponnamma (m. 1963; died 2016)
- Children: 5

Shri Ajjikuttira Kariappa Subbaiah (9 August 1934 – 27 August 2019) was the Leader of the Opposition in the Karnataka Legislative Council, and a four time Member of the Legislative Council of Karnataka state in India. He was also a lawyer practicing in the Karnataka High Court, and a social activist.

== Early life ==
Born in a village near Virajpet, Subbaiah was the only son of Chinnavva and Kariappa. He lost his father when he was about seven months old, and grew up with his maternal grand mother. He started his education in Harihara village in 1943, and finished high school in T. Shettigeri. AKS started his career as a second division clerk in the health department before moving on to get his bachelor's degree in Science (BSc). AKS graduated with a Bachelor of Law (BL) degree from Sharada Vilas college in Mysore in 1963 and was first elected to the Karnataka council in 1966 from the Jana Sangha party. When the Indian Emergency was declared in 1975, AKS was the first political prisoner in Karnataka and spent a total of 18 months in various jails before being released from the Bangalore Central Jail.

== Career ==
Subbaiah was elected as first president of the Bharatiya Janata Party in 1980. During his supervision, the party won 18 assembly seats in the 1983 elections. The first non-congress government in Karnataka was then formed by Shri Ramakrishna Hegde with outside support from AKS and the 18 BJP MLAs (Members of Legislative Assembly). In 1984, AKS was expelled from the party due to ideological differences and went on to form his own Kannada Nadu party. He again was elected an MLC for the last time with the Congress party under the leadership of Shri. Rajeev Gandhi. AKS continued his anti-BJP and anti-Sangha activities until his death in August 2019.
