= Somwarpet Assembly constituency =

Former Assembly constituency in Karnataka, India

Coordinates: 12.043667°N 76.979520°E

Somwarpet
- Former constituency for the Karnataka Legislative Assembly

Constituency details
- Country: India
- Region: South India
- State: Karnataka
- Division: Mysore
- District: Kodagu
- Lok Sabha constituency: Mangalore
- Established: 1967
- Abolished: 2008
- Reservation: None

Somwarpet Assembly constituency was one of the constituencies in Karnataka state assembly in India until 2008 when it was made defunct. It was part of Mangalore Lok Sabha constituency.

== Members of the Legislative Assembly ==
Election	Member	Party
1967	Gundugutti Manjanathaya	Swatantra Party
1972	R. Gundu Rao	Indian National Congress
1978	R. Gundu Rao	Indian National Congress
1983	B. A. Jivijaya	Janata Party
1985	B. A. Jivijaya	Janata Party
1989	A. M. Belliappa	Indian National Congress
1994	Appachu Ranjan	Bharatiya Janata Party
1999	Appachu Ranjan	Bharatiya Janata Party
2004	B. A. Jivijaya	Indian National Congress

== Election results ==
=== Assembly Election 2004 ===
2004 Karnataka Legislative Assembly election : Somwarpet
Party	Candidate	Votes	%	±%
INC	B. A. Jivijaya	46,560	44.27%	▲21.62
BJP	Appachu Ranjan	43,763	41.61%	▲2.53
JD(S)	Shashidar. V. P	9,244	8.79%	▲6.96
JP	Rajesh Gundu Rao	3,988	3.79%	New
Independent	Bhaverappa. I. P	817	0.78%	New
Kannada Nadu Party	Amruthesh. N. P	797	0.76%	New
Margin of victory		2,797	2.66%	▼1.24
Turnout		105,407	72.74%	▼1.87
Total valid votes		105,169		
Registered electors		144,904		▲11.37
INC gain from BJP		Swing	▲5.19	

=== Assembly Election 1999 ===
1999 Karnataka Legislative Assembly election : Somwarpet
Party	Candidate	Votes	%	±%
BJP	Appachu Ranjan	35,768	39.08%	▲3.27
Independent	B. A. Jivijaya	32,195	35.17%	New
INC	K. P. Chandrakala	20,730	22.65%	▼6.61
JD(S)	R. K. Chinnappa	1,675	1.83%	New
BSP	Kaliveera J. Sridhara	607	0.66%	New
Margin of victory		3,573	3.90%	▲1.82
Turnout		97,071	74.61%	▲0.76
Total valid votes		91,529		
Rejected ballots		5,462	5.63%	▲4.36
Registered electors		130,113		▲2.31
BJP hold		Swing	▲3.27	

=== Assembly Election 1994 ===
1994 Karnataka Legislative Assembly election : Somwarpet
Party	Candidate	Votes	%	±%
BJP	Appachu Ranjan	33,195	35.81%	▲13.66
JD	B. A. Jivijaya	31,267	33.73%	▲24.54
INC	A. M. Belliappa	27,123	29.26%	▼15.08
INC	H. M. Srikesh	599	0.65%	New
Margin of victory		1,928	2.08%	▼20.11
Turnout		93,917	73.85%	▲0.55
Total valid votes		92,704		
Rejected ballots		1,195	1.27%	▼3.55
Registered electors		127,179		▲2.86
BJP gain from INC		Swing	▼8.53	

=== Assembly Election 1989 ===
1989 Karnataka Legislative Assembly election : Somwarpet
Party	Candidate	Votes	%	±%
INC	A. M. Belliappa	38,250	44.34%	▲2.17
BJP	B. B. Shivappa	19,104	22.15%	▲18.28
JP	B. A. Jivijaya	17,385	20.15%	New
JD	R. K. Chinnappa	7,924	9.19%	New
Independent	T. K. Saikumar	1,665	1.93%	New
Margin of victory		19,146	22.19%	▲14.28
Turnout		90,630	73.30%	▲0.40
Total valid votes		86,264		
Rejected ballots		4,366	4.82%	▲3.61
Registered electors		123,637		▲16.58
INC gain from JP		Swing	▼5.74	

=== Assembly Election 1985 ===
1985 Karnataka Legislative Assembly election : Somwarpet
Party	Candidate	Votes	%	±%
JP	B. A. Jivijaya	38,248	50.08%	▼2.58
INC	A. M. Belliappa	32,209	42.17%	▼1.50
BJP	Y. M. Karumbaiah	2,955	3.87%	New
Independent	Abdul Rahiman	1,410	1.85%	New
Margin of victory		6,039	7.91%	▼1.07
Turnout		77,306	72.90%	▲2.48
Total valid votes		76,374		
Rejected ballots		932	1.21%	▼0.54
Registered electors		106,051		▲22.50
JP hold		Swing	▼2.58	

=== Assembly Election 1983 ===
1983 Karnataka Legislative Assembly election : Somwarpet
Party	Candidate	Votes	%	±%
JP	B. A. Jivijaya	31,544	52.66%	▲7.24
INC	R. Gundu Rao	26,162	43.67%	▲41.71
AIML	K. Abbobakar	1,983	3.31%	New
Margin of victory		5,382	8.98%	▲3.13
Turnout		60,968	70.42%	▼9.54
Total valid votes		59,903		
Rejected ballots		1,065	1.75%	▼0.69
Registered electors		86,573		▲9.62
JP gain from INC(I)		Swing	▲1.39	

=== Assembly Election 1978 ===
1978 Karnataka Legislative Assembly election : Somwarpet
Party	Candidate	Votes	%	±%
INC(I)	R. Gundu Rao	31,588	51.27%	New
JP	B. A. Jivijaya	27,982	45.42%	New
INC	G. M. Habib	1,210	1.96%	▼54.28
Independent	D. Hanumaraje Urs	831	1.35%	New
Margin of victory		3,606	5.85%	▼18.04
Turnout		63,151	79.96%	▲20.31
Total valid votes		61,611		
Rejected ballots		1,540	2.44%	▲2.44
Registered electors		78,975		▲9.53
INC(I) gain from INC		Swing	▼4.97	

=== Assembly Election 1972 ===
1972 Mysore State Legislative Assembly election : Somwarpet
Party	Candidate	Votes	%	±%
INC	R. Gundu Rao	23,448	56.24%	▲10.71
INC(O)	C. K. Kalappa	13,489	32.35%	New
CPI(M)	B. N. Venkataramana	3,225	7.74%	New
ABJS	D. S. Manjunath	1,530	3.67%	New
Margin of victory		9,959	23.89%	▲14.96
Turnout		43,009	59.65%	▼12.94
Total valid votes		41,692		
Registered electors		72,105		▲39.98
INC gain from SWA		Swing	▲1.77	

=== Assembly Election 1967 ===
1967 Mysore State Legislative Assembly election : Somwarpet
Party	Candidate	Votes	%	±%
SWA	Gundugutti Manjanathaya	19,379	54.47%	New
INC	C. K. Kalappa	16,201	45.53%	New
Margin of victory		3,178	8.93%	
Turnout		37,395	72.59%	
Total valid votes		35,580		
Registered electors		51,512		
SWA win (new seat)				

== See also ==
- List of constituencies of the Karnataka Legislative Assembly
