= Attur, Somwarpet =

Attur Nallur Attur Forest
- village
- Atthur, Somwarpet is in Kodagu district
- Country: India
- State: Karnataka
- District: Kodagu
- Talukas: Somwarpet

Government
  - Body: Village Panchayat

Languages
  - Official: Kannada, Kodava
- Time zone: UTC+5:30 (IST)
- PIN: 571237
- Vehicle registration: KA-12
- Nearest city: Madikeri
- Civic agency: Village Panchayat

Attur Nallur is a small village in Somwarpet Taluk in Kodagu District of Karnataka State, India. It comes under Attur Nallur Panchayath. It belongs to Mysore Division. It is located 12 km to the east of District headquarters Madikeri. 28 km from Somvarpet and 234 km from state capital Bangalore.

Kedakal (5km), Nanjarayapatna (6km), Valnur Thyagathur (8km), Kadagadalu (8km), Ibnivalvadi (9km) are the nearby villages to Attur Nallur. Attur Nallur is surrounded by Somvarpet Taluk towards North, Piriyapatna Taluk towards East, Virajpet Taluk towards South and Arkalgud Taluk towards north.

Madikeri, Sakleshpur, Mangalore, Mattannur and Taliparamba are the nearby cities to Attur Nallur.

It is located in the Somwarpet taluk of Kodagu district in Karnataka.

== Schools ==
- Jnanaganga Residential School

== See also ==
- Kodagu
- Districts of Karnataka
