= Bhagamandala =

- Village
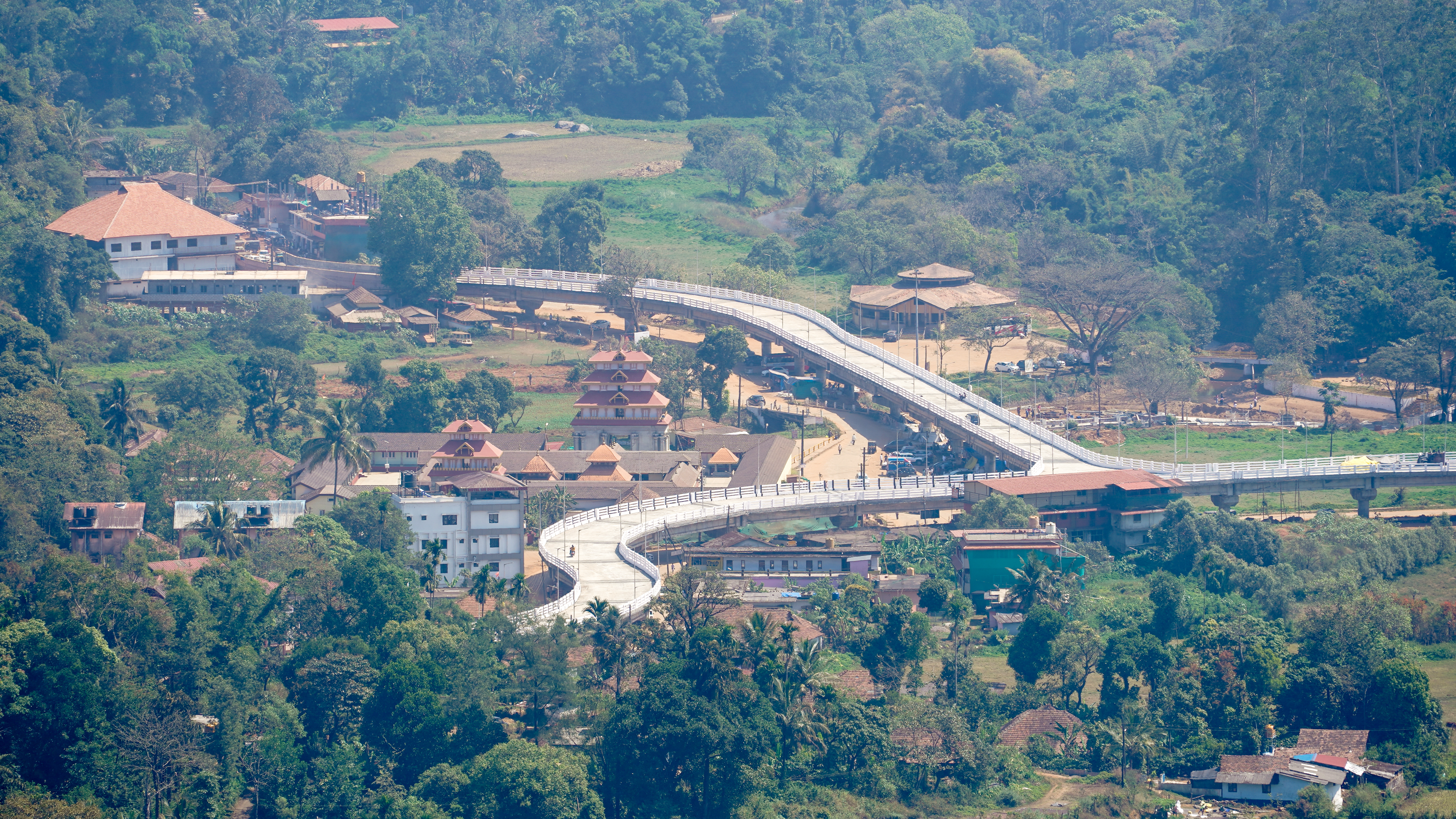
- Bhagamandala from Tala Kaveri road

- Location in Karnataka, India Bhagamandala (India)
- Coordinates: 12.385053°N 75.532266°E
- Country: India
- State: Karnataka
- District: Kodagu
- Taluk: Madikeri

Government
  - Body: Gram panchayat

Area
  - Total: 32.51 km^{2} (12.55 sq mi)
- Elevation: 898 m (2,946 ft)

Population (2011)
  - Total: 1,917
  - Density: 58.97/km^{2} (152.7/sq mi)

Languages
  - Official: Kannada
  - Other: Arebhashe, Kodava, Malayalam
- Time zone: UTC+5:30 (IST)
- PIN: 571 247
- Telephone code: 08272
- Vehicle registration: KA-12

Bhagamandala is a pilgrimage place in Kodagu district of the Indian state of Karnataka.

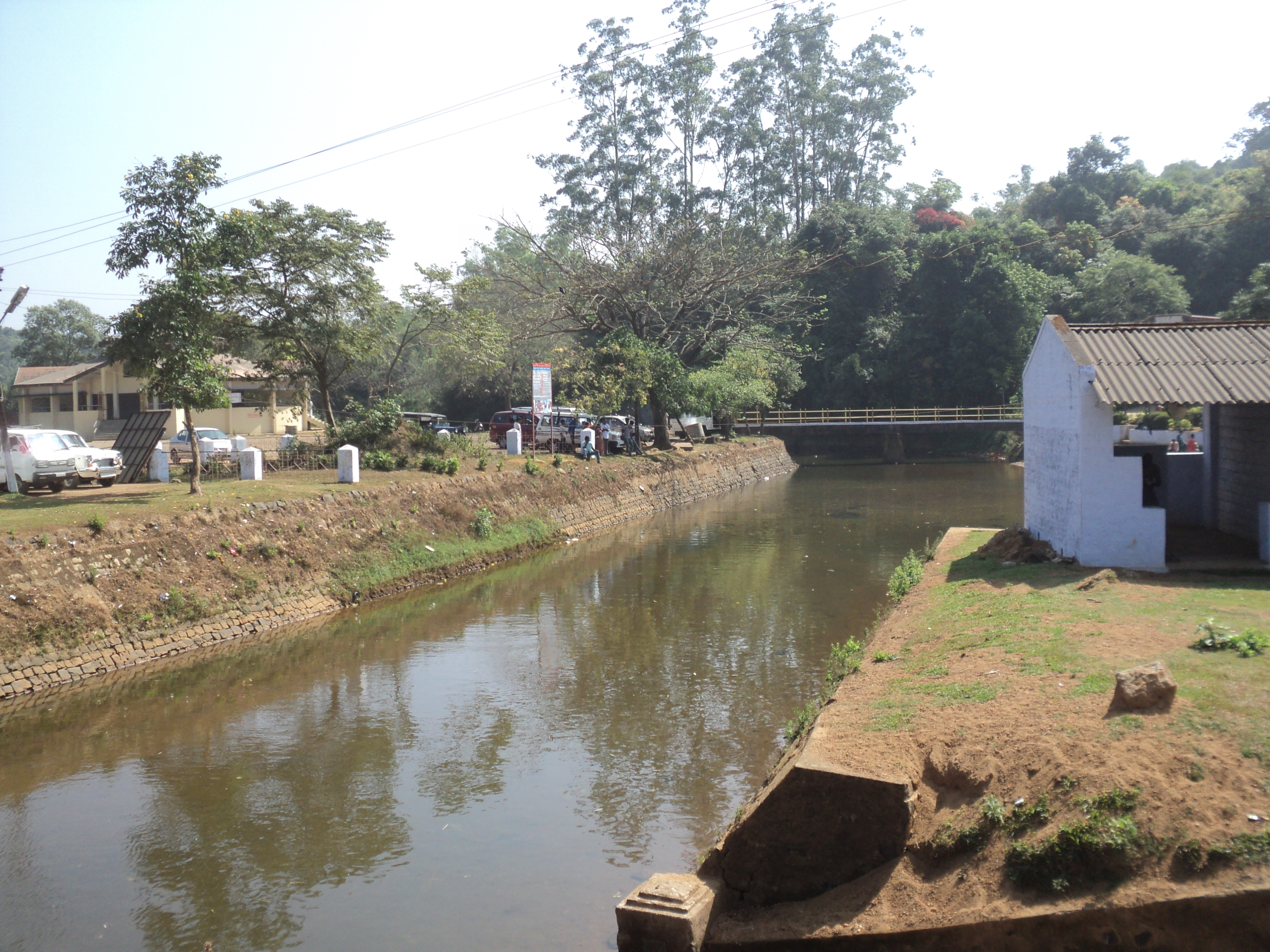
Kaveri in Bhagamandala

== Location ==
Bhagamandala is situated on the river Kaveri in its upstream stretches. At this place, the Kaveri is joined by two tributaries, the Kannike and the mythical Sujyothi river. It is considered sacred as a river confluence (kudala or triveni sangama, in Kannada and Sanskrit respectively). Bhagamandala is located 133 km south-east of Mangalore. It has an average elevation of 898 m (2,946 ft).

== Pilgrim centre – Bhagandeshwara Temple ==
It is a common practice for pilgrims to take a dip in the triveni sangama and perform rituals to their ancestors before proceeding to Talakaveri, the birthplace of Kaveri. A temple of Lord Supremo Shiva in the name of Bhagandeshwara embellishes the place. It is the local belief that Kaveri, revered as Dakshina Ganga, comes out of the matted hair locks of Shiva here. During Tula Sankramana which falls on 17 or 18 October, pilgrims assemble here in large numbers.

== Three river meet ==
A short distance from the triveni sangama, there is a famous temple known as Sri Bhagandeshwara Temple, where murti (sacred images) of Bhagandeshwara (Ishwara), Subramanya and Ganapati are installed. This place is also known as Bhagandeshwara Kshetra, from which the name Bhagamandala is derived. The temples in this area are built in Karavali (West Coast) style.

== History ==
During 1785–1790, the area was occupied by Tipu Sultan. The temple was burnt and destroyed. He renamed Bhagamandala to Afzalabad. In 1790 King Dodda Vira Rajendra took Bhagamandala back into an independent Kodagu kingdom.

Bhagamandala is located about 33 km from the district headquarters Madikeri and is connected by paved roads from Madikeri, Virajpet and nearby places in Karnataka and Kerala. Government and private buses are available on all of these routes.

== Padi temple ==
A short distance from Bhagamandala is the temple at Padi, which houses the deity Lord Igguthappa and is one of the most sacred shrines of the Kodava people.

== Aiyangeri temple ==
There is one more temple at Aiyangeri, named "Chinnathappa", which houses the deity Lord Sri Krishna, considered by the people of the village to be the most sacred shrine in their home land. There is a festival once a year in the month of February or March, where the "Golden Flute" will be brought out from the temple.

== Mount Thavoor ==
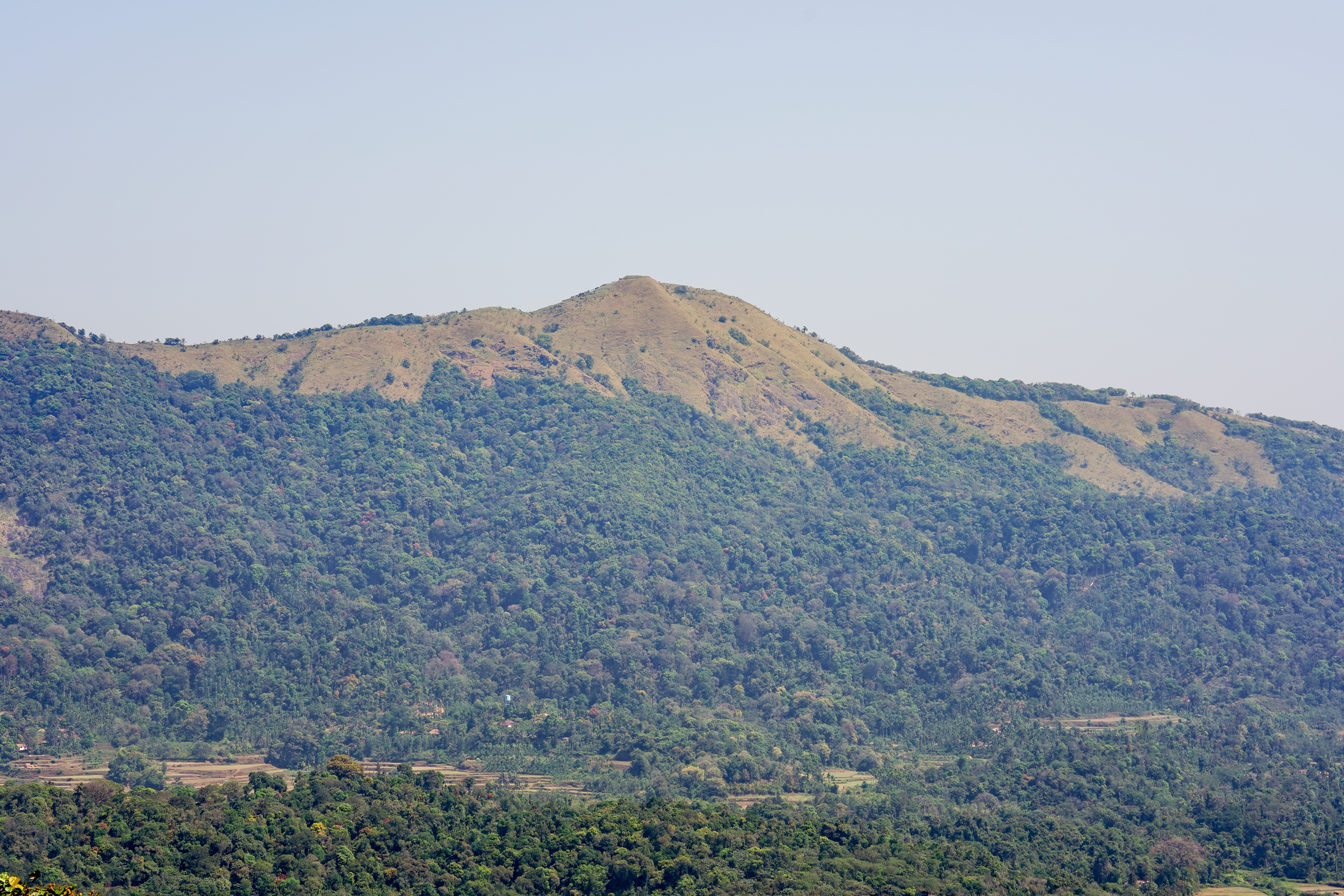
Mt. Koppatti from the south

Mt. Thavoor is a peak overlooking Bhagamandala and Mt. Koppatti (elevation 1,475 metres (4,839 ft); 12°24′17.6688″N 75°35′40.2936″E), which may be considered its twin peak is nearby and both these serve as trekking routes for the Shola forest range.

== Kashi Math ==
Bhagmandala Shri Kashi Math is a branch of Shri Kashi Math Samsthan, Varanasi located in Bhagmandala.

== Climate ==
Bhagamandala experiences a Tropical monsoon climate under the Köppen climate classification.

Climate data for Bhagamandala
Month	Jan	Feb	Mar	Apr	May	Jun	Jul	Aug	Sep	Oct	Nov	Dec	Year
Mean daily maximum °C (°F)	26.5 (79.7)	28.1 (82.6)	29.6 (85.3)	29.2 (84.6)	27.9 (82.2)	23.9 (75.0)	22.4 (72.3)	22.8 (73.0)	23.9 (75.0)	25.5 (77.9)	25.6 (78.1)	25.8 (78.4)	25.9 (78.7)
Mean daily minimum °C (°F)	16.0 (60.8)	17.0 (62.6)	18.5 (65.3)	19.7 (67.5)	20.0 (68.0)	18.9 (66.0)	18.6 (65.5)	18.6 (65.5)	18.4 (65.1)	18.6 (65.5)	17.8 (64.0)	16.4 (61.5)	18.2 (64.8)
Average rainfall mm (inches)	5 (0.2)	5 (0.2)	20 (0.8)	115 (4.5)	232 (9.1)	1,222 (48.1)	2,024 (79.7)	1,222 (48.1)	479 (18.9)	318 (12.5)	101 (4.0)	24 (0.9)	5,767 (227)
Source 1: Directorate of Economics and Statistics, Karnataka
Source 2: Climate-Data.org

== Rainfall ==
Bhagamandala is the highest rainfall receiving station in the Kodagu district, every year. In 2018, it received an annual rainfall of 5,585 millimetres (219.9 in).

In 2019, Bhagamandala received 4,687 millimetres (184.5 in) of annual rainfall, this time falling behind Hudikeri, which received 4,716 millimetres (185.7 in) of rainfall.

In 2022, it received a total of 5,163 millimetres (203.3 in) rainfall, making it the 4th highest rainfall receiving station in Karnataka, after Kundapura (5806mm), Ajekar (5730mm), and Byndoor (5284mm).

In 2024, even though Karnataka as a whole, received 19% excess rainfall, Bhagamandala hobli received 23% deficit downpour. It failed to breach the 5,000 millimetres (200 in) mark consecutively for two years, receiving only 4481mm of rainfall in 2024.

In 2025, Bhagamandala received (-23%) deficit rainfall. It received only 4,467 millimetres (175.9 in) of annual rainfall. Hudikeri hobli in southern part of Kodagu took the lead with 5,581.3 millimetres (219.74 in), highest in Kodagu for the year 2025.

== See also ==
- Sullia
- Bhagamandala Nad Assembly constituency
