= Gundugutti Manjanathaya =

Indian freedom fighter and politician

Gundugutti M. Manjanathaya
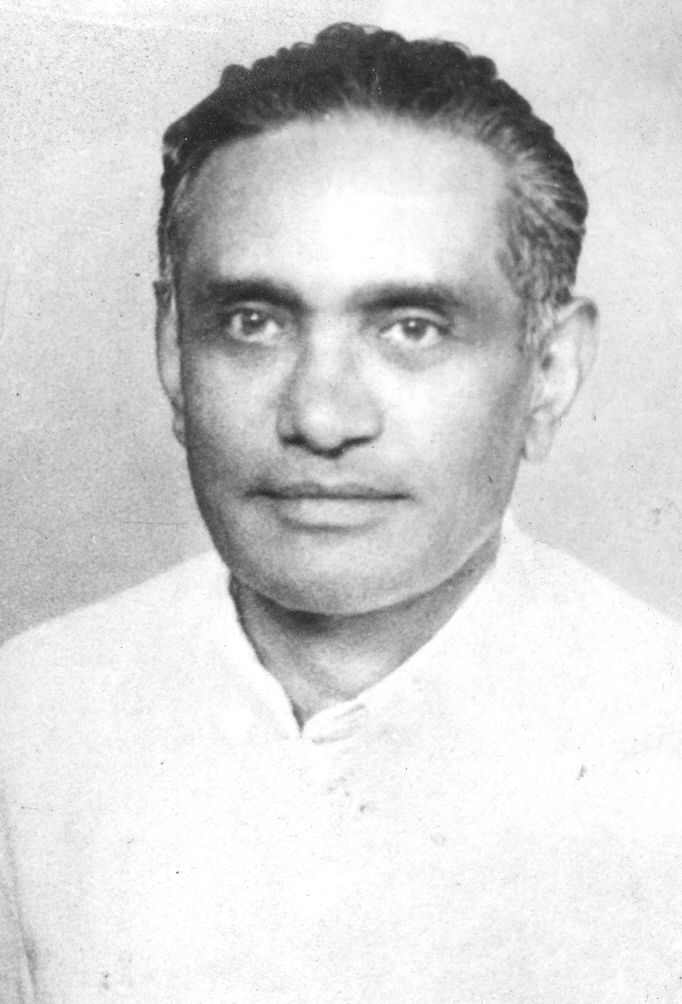
- Born: G. M. Manjanatha; June 2, 1904; Kodagu (Coorg), India
- Occupations: Freedom fighter, politician

Signature
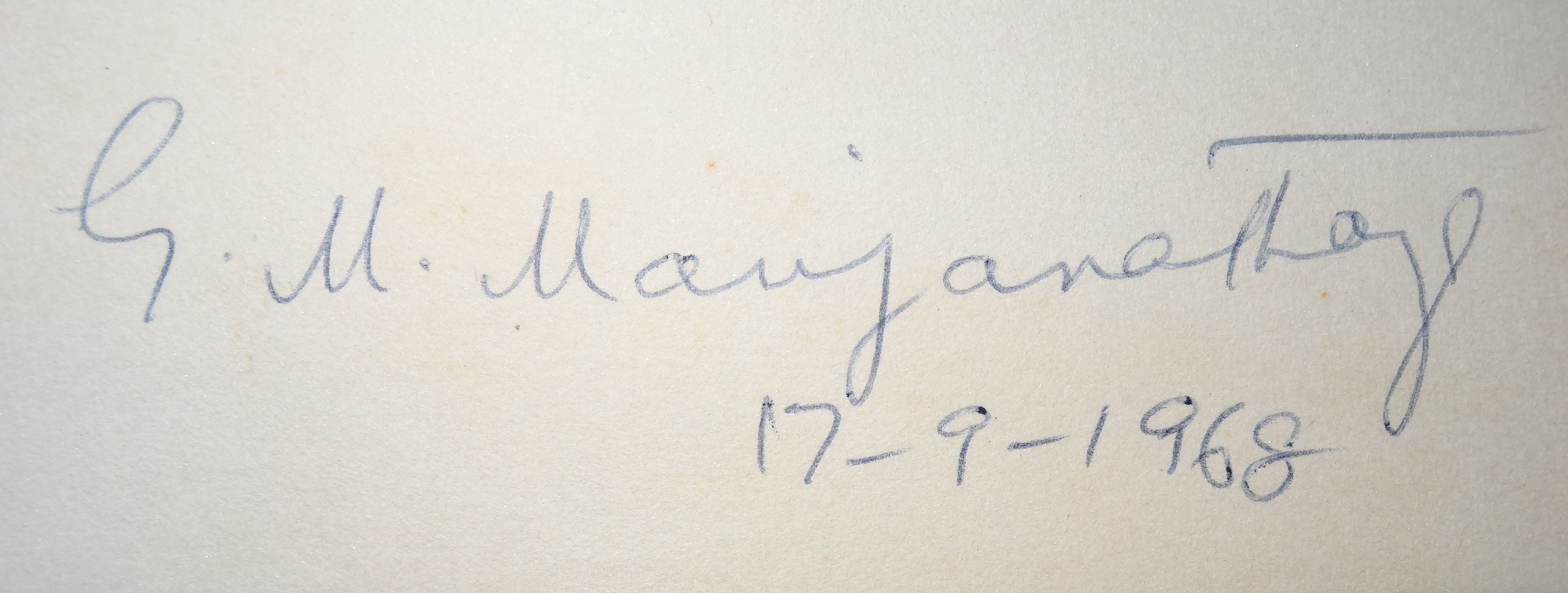

Gundugutti M. Manjanathaya was an Indian freedom fighter and politician. Born as G. M. Manjanath, on 2 June 1904, he was a prominent coffee planter and lived in the village of Gundugutti in Somwarpet taluk in Kodagu district.

== Freedom movement ==
In 1934, Pandyanda Belliappa, another prominent freedom fighter, and Gundugutti Manjanathaya succeeded in persuading Mahatma Gandhi to tour Coorg for his cause of gaining donations towards the Harijan welfare fund. They accompanied him into Coorg and he stayed at Gundugutti Manjanathaya's house for one evening. It was here that Mrs. B. T. Gopal Krishna, better known as Kodagina Gowramma, a famous Kannada woman writer and his relative, donated her jewellery for the cause and invited the entourage to her house. During the 1942 Quit India Movement Manjanathaya's eldest son Gundugutti Narasimhamurthy organised a Seva Mandal in Madikeri to inspire the youth.

== Politics ==
In 1947 Coorg was a separate state in South India. Coorg had two MPs in the Union Parliament then, besides having a state legislative body. Manjanathaya was elected MLA (Member of the Legislative Assembly) of the State of Coorg (now Kodagu), between the years 1952-1957 and represented Sunticoppa I constituency as a member of the Indian National Congress party. In 1956 the State Reorganisation Act was passed. Coorg State (Kodagu) was merged with Mysore State and the legislative body at Madikeri was dissolved. In 1967 G.M. Manjanathaya represented the Swatantra Party and defeated INC candidate C.K. Kalappa from Somwarpet constituency in the Mysore State (Old name for Karnataka) Elections in 1967.

== Legacy ==
You can also locate a high school called Gundugutty school, named after its founder GMM.
