= Aimangala, Virajpet =

Aimangala
- village
- Aimangala, Virajpet is in Kodagu district
- Country: India
- State: Karnataka
- District: Kodagu
- Taluk: Virajpet

Government
  - Body: Village Panchayat

Population (2011)
  - Total: 651

Languages
  - Official: Kodava
- Time zone: UTC+5:30 (IST)
- Postal code: 571218
- Vehicle registration: KA-12
- Nearest city: Kodagu
- Civic agency: Village Panchayat

Aimangala, Virajpet is a village in the southern state of Karnataka, India. It is located in the Virajpet taluk of Kodagu district in Karnataka. It belongs to Mysore Division. It is located 29 km south from the district headquarters of Madikeri, 10 km from Virajpet, and 247 km from Bangalore.

== See also ==
- Kodagu
- Districts of Karnataka
- Mangalore
