= Attur block, Dindigul =

Attur block is a revenue block in the Dindigul district of Tamil Nadu, India. It has a total of 22 panchayat villages.
