= Bidarur =

- Village
- Location in Karnataka, India Bidarur (India)
- Coordinates: 12.718780°N 75.882640°E
- Country: India
- State: Karnataka
- District: Kodagu
- Talukas: Somvarpet

Government
  - Body: Gram panchayat

Area
  - Total: 2.6859 km^{2} (1.0370 sq mi)

Population (2011)
  - Total: 5,879
  - Density: 2,189/km^{2} (5,669/sq mi)

Languages
  - Official: Kannada
- Time zone: UTC+5:30 (IST)
- PIN: 571235
- ISO 3166 code: IN-KA
- Vehicle registration: KA-12
- Website: karnataka.gov.in

Bidarur is a village in the southern state of Karnataka, India. It is located in the Somvarpet taluk of Kodagu district. As per census survey 2011, the location code number of Bidarur is 617892.

== Demographics ==
As of 2001 India census, Bidarur had a population of 5051 with 2515 males and 2536 females.

== See also ==
- Kodagu
- Districts of Karnataka
- Mangalore
