= Shanivarsanthe =

Shanivarasanthe
- Village
- Location in Karnataka, India Shanivarasanthe (India)
- Coordinates: 12.728623°N 75.886327°E
- Country: India
- State: Karnataka
- District: Kodagu
- Taluk: Somwarpet

Government
  - Body: Grama Panchayath

Area
  - Total: 2.70 km^{2} (1.04 sq mi)
- Elevation: 964 m (3,163 ft)

Population
  - Total: 5,879
  - Density: 2,180/km^{2} (5,640/sq mi)

Languages
  - Official: Kannada
  - Other: Kannada
- Time zone: UTC+5:30 (IST)
- PIN: 571235
- ISO 3166 code: IN-KA
- Vehicle registration: KA-12
- Website: http://www.kodagu.nic.in

Shanivarasanthe/Sanivarasanthe is a small town in Kodagu district in the Indian state of Karnataka. It is one of the towns of Somwarpet taluk, in the north-east of the district. As per census survey of India 2011, Shanivarsanthe comes under Bidarur jurisdiction, which has been given a location code number 617892.

The main crops grown in the area are coffee, paddy, and spices.

Kannada, Kodava Takk, Tulu, Beary bashe, Hindi, and English are spoken by the people.

== Flora and fauna ==
Coffee and paddy are the major crop in the region. Other crops, like pepper, cardamom, ginger, and other vegetables are also grown. Also, it is famous for growing silver oak tree.

== Religion and Caste ==
Hindus, Muslims along with some Christians are present in this town, while the main castes are Billavas, Shettys, Vokkaligas, Lingayats, and Kodavas among the Hindus. Both Urdu and Muslim Malayalam (Byare Bashe) are spoken among the Muslims.

== Notable persons ==
- Field Marshal KM Cariappa, The first Indian Chief of Army Staff for the Indian Army was born here.

== Places of attraction ==
1. Mallalli falls
2. Bisle ghat
3. Pushpagiri Wildlife Sanctuary
4. Manjarabad Fort

== See also ==
- Madikeri
- Somwarpet
- Mangalore
- Virajpet
