= Virajpet Assembly constituency =

Constituency of the Karnataka legislative assembly in India

Coordinates: 12.2°N 75.8°E

Virajpet
- Constituency No. 209 for the Karnataka Legislative Assembly

Constituency details
- Country: India
- Region: South India
- State: Karnataka
- District: Kodagu
- Lok Sabha constituency: Mysore
- Established: 1956
- Total electors: 224,936 (2023)
- Reservation: None

Member of Legislative Assembly
- 16th Karnataka Legislative Assembly
- Incumbent A. S. Ponnanna
- Party: Indian National Congress
- Elected year: 2023
- Preceded by: K. G. Bopaiah

Virajpet Assembly constituency is one of the 224 Karnataka Legislative Assembly constituencies of Karnataka and is one among the two assembly constituencies in Kodagu district.

It is represented in the Karnataka Legislative Assembly by A. S. Ponnanna of the Indian National Congress.

Virajpet Assembly constituency is a part of Mysore Lok Sabha constituency. From 1956 to 2008, it was a part of the erstwhile Mangalore Lok Sabha constituency and was merged with the Mysore Lok Sabha constituency in 2008 by the Delimitation Commission. Virajpet was part of the erstwhile Coorg State until 1956, when under the States Reorganisation Act, 1956, it became a part of Mysore State (now Karnataka).

== Electorate ==
The constituency has 2.1 lakh voters and has more male voters than female voters drawing a stark contrast from Madikeri Assembly constituency. It also has more Kodava voters than Gowdas.The Scheduled Castes and Scheduled Tribes comprises 26.8% of the vote base with ST's outnumbering SC's. The electorate is predominantly Hindus with Muslims and Christians forming less than 16% of the vote base. The constituency is more rural than Madikeri with less than 10% urban voters.

== Members of the Legislative Assembly ==
Election	Member	Party
1957	C. M. Poonacha	Indian National Congress
1959 By-election (Note: Resigned in 1959)	K. P. Karumbaya	Praja Socialist Party
1962	A. P. Appanna	Indian National Congress
1967	N. Lokayya Naik	Bharatiya Jana Sangh
1972	G. K. Subhaiah	Indian National Congress
1978	G. K. Subhaiah	Indian National Congress
1983	G. K. Subhaiah	Indian National Congress
1985	Suma Vasantha	Indian National Congress
1989	Suma Vasantha	Indian National Congress
1994	H. D. Basavaraju	Bharatiya Janata Party
1999	Suma Vasantha	Indian National Congress
2004	H. D. Basavaraju	Bharatiya Janata Party
2008	K. G. Bopaiah	Bharatiya Janata Party
2013	K. G. Bopaiah	Bharatiya Janata Party
2018	K. G. Bopaiah	Bharatiya Janata Party
2023	A. S. Ponnanna	Indian National Congress

== Election results ==
=== Assembly Election 2023 ===
2023 Karnataka Legislative Assembly election : Virajpet
Party	Candidate	Votes	%	±%
INC	A. S. Ponnanna	83,791	49.94%	▲9.00
BJP	K. G. Bopaiah	79,500	47.38%	▼2.02
NOTA	None of the above	1,636	0.98%	▼0.12
JD(S)	Manzoor Ali. M. A	1,121	0.67%	▼6.44
Margin of victory		4,291	2.56%	▼5.90
Turnout		167,817	74.61%	▲1.97
Total valid votes		167,778		
Registered electors		224,936		▲3.44
INC gain from BJP		Swing	▲0.54	

=== Assembly Election 2018 ===
2018 Karnataka Legislative Assembly election : Virajpet
Party	Candidate	Votes	%	±%
BJP	K. G. Bopaiah	77,944	49.40%	▲0.06
INC	Arun Machaiah. C. S	64,591	40.94%	▼5.89
JD(S)	Sanketh Poovaiah. M	11,224	7.11%	▲2.80
NOTA	None of the above	1,733	1.10%	New
AIMEP	H. D. Basavaraju	1,015	0.64%	New
Margin of victory		13,353	8.46%	▲5.96
Turnout		157,967	72.64%	▲1.87
Total valid votes		157,772		
Registered electors		217,457		▲8.04
BJP hold		Swing	▲0.06	

=== Assembly Election 2013 ===
2013 Karnataka Legislative Assembly election : Virajpet
Party	Candidate	Votes	%	±%
BJP	K. G. Bopaiah	67,250	49.34%	▲7.56
INC	Biddatanda. T. Pradeep	63,836	46.83%	▲18.01
JD(S)	Dambekodi Madappa	5,880	4.31%	▼21.41
Independent	Vijayasingh. R. David	2,140	1.57%	New
BSRCP	Aiyappa. M. N	972	0.71%	New
Margin of victory		3,414	2.50%	▼10.46
Turnout		142,447	70.77%	▲10.02
Total valid votes		136,307		
Registered electors		201,282		▲5.00
BJP hold		Swing	▲7.56	

=== Assembly Election 2008 ===
2008 Karnataka Legislative Assembly election : Virajpet
Party	Candidate	Votes	%	±%
BJP	K. G. Bopaiah	48,605	41.78%	▼9.70
INC	Veena Achaiah	33,532	28.82%	▼10.98
JD(S)	Arun Machaiah. C. S	29,920	25.72%	▲17.00
SP	Achapanda Giri Uthappa	2,464	2.12%	New
BSP	Kunhi Abdulla. K. M	1,825	1.57%	New
Margin of victory		15,073	12.96%	▲1.28
Turnout		116,450	60.75%	▲2.07
Total valid votes		116,346		
Registered electors		191,703		▲62.78
BJP hold		Swing	▼9.70	

=== Assembly Election 2004 ===
2004 Karnataka Legislative Assembly election : Virajpet
Party	Candidate	Votes	%	±%
BJP	H. D. Basavaraju	35,550	51.48%	▲9.69
INC	Suma Vasantha	27,484	39.80%	▼9.16
JD(S)	Mutha. P. S	6,023	8.72%	▲1.54
Margin of victory		8,066	11.68%	▲4.51
Turnout		69,109	58.68%	▼2.35
Total valid votes		69,057		
Registered electors		117,767		▲15.69
BJP gain from INC		Swing	▲2.52	

=== Assembly Election 1999 ===
1999 Karnataka Legislative Assembly election : Virajpet
Party	Candidate	Votes	%	±%
INC	Suma Vasantha	29,136	48.96%	▲16.03
BJP	H. D. Basavaraju	24,867	41.79%	▲5.92
JD(S)	K. B. Shanthappa	4,271	7.18%	New
Independent	G. S. Pushkara	669	1.12%	New
BSP	J. P. Raju	567	0.95%	New
Margin of victory		4,269	7.17%	▲4.24
Turnout		62,122	61.03%	▲0.96
Total valid votes		59,510		
Rejected ballots		2,612	4.20%	▲2.11
Registered electors		101,793		▼1.46
INC gain from BJP		Swing	▲13.09	

=== Assembly Election 1994 ===
1994 Karnataka Legislative Assembly election : Virajpet
Party	Candidate	Votes	%	±%
BJP	H. D. Basavaraju	21,790	35.87%	▲25.16
INC	Suma Vasantha	20,009	32.93%	▼20.69
JD	K. B. Shanthappa	16,693	27.48%	▼0.68
INC	Motaiah. P. S	2,141	3.52%	New
Margin of victory		1,781	2.93%	▼22.53
Turnout		62,057	60.07%	▲1.20
Total valid votes		60,755		
Rejected ballots		1,297	2.09%	▼3.41
Registered electors		103,300		▼4.09
BJP gain from INC		Swing	▼17.75	

=== Assembly Election 1989 ===
1989 Karnataka Legislative Assembly election : Virajpet
Party	Candidate	Votes	%	±%
INC	Suma Vasantha	32,124	53.62%	▼1.28
JD	G. S. Pushkara	16,872	28.16%	New
BJP	Paniyeravara. P. Choma	6,416	10.71%	▲3.62
JP	H. T. Devaraj	4,203	7.02%	New
Margin of victory		15,252	25.46%	▲8.57
Turnout		63,398	58.87%	▲2.59
Total valid votes		59,909		
Rejected ballots		3,489	5.50%	▲4.22
Registered electors		107,700		▲22.97
INC hold		Swing	▼1.28	

=== Assembly Election 1985 ===
1985 Karnataka Legislative Assembly election : Virajpet
Party	Candidate	Votes	%	±%
INC	Suma Vasantha	26,716	54.90%	▲0.52
JP	H. D. Rajan	18,496	38.01%	New
BJP	Appanna Rao. M. E	3,449	7.09%	▼26.64
Margin of victory		8,220	16.89%	▼3.75
Turnout		49,290	56.28%	▲2.63
Total valid votes		48,661		
Rejected ballots		629	1.28%	▼0.84
Registered electors		87,582		▲10.75
INC hold		Swing	▲0.52	

=== Assembly Election 1983 ===
1983 Karnataka Legislative Assembly election : Virajpet
Party	Candidate	Votes	%	±%
INC	G. K. Subhaiah	22,581	54.38%	▲51.31
BJP	Paniyeravara. P. Choma	14,009	33.73%	New
Independent	H. T. Devaraj	4,938	11.89%	New
Margin of victory		8,572	20.64%	▲16.29
Turnout		42,428	53.65%	▼16.41
Total valid votes		41,528		
Rejected ballots		900	2.12%	▼0.18
Registered electors		79,084		▲3.68
INC gain from INC(I)		Swing	▲5.90	

=== Assembly Election 1978 ===
1978 Karnataka Legislative Assembly election : Virajpet
Party	Candidate	Votes	%	±%
INC(I)	G. K. Subhaiah	25,309	48.48%	New
JP	Paniyeravara. P. Choma	23,040	44.13%	New
Independent	N. Lokayya Naik	2,258	4.33%	New
INC	Jenukurubara Annaiah Appu	1,601	3.07%	▼60.64
Margin of victory		2,269	4.35%	▼24.79
Turnout		53,438	70.06%	▲19.82
Total valid votes		52,208		
Rejected ballots		1,230	2.30%	▲2.30
Registered electors		76,274		▲18.80
INC(I) gain from INC		Swing	▼15.23	

=== Assembly Election 1972 ===
1972 Mysore State Legislative Assembly election : Virajpet
Party	Candidate	Votes	%	±%
INC	G. K. Subhaiah	20,023	63.71%	▲16.10
ABJS	N. Lokayya Naik	10,866	34.58%	▼17.81
Independent	M. K. Narayana	537	1.71%	New
Margin of victory		9,157	29.14%	▲24.37
Turnout		32,253	50.24%	▼10.40
Total valid votes		31,426		
Registered electors		64,202		▲32.74
INC gain from ABJS		Swing	▲11.32	

=== Assembly Election 1967 ===
1967 Mysore State Legislative Assembly election : Virajpet
Party	Candidate	Votes	%	±%
ABJS	N. Lokayya Naik	14,444	52.39%	New
INC	A. N. Belli	13,128	47.61%	▼2.94
Margin of victory		1,316	4.77%	▼22.73
Turnout		29,328	60.64%	▲1.04
Total valid votes		27,572		
Registered electors		48,366		▼10.20
ABJS gain from INC		Swing	▲1.84	

=== Assembly Election 1962 ===
1962 Mysore State Legislative Assembly election : Virajpet
Party	Candidate	Votes	%	±%
INC	A. P. Appanna	15,292	50.55%	▲4.33
Independent	Checkera. B. Muthanna	6,973	23.05%	New
CPI	I. R. Asranna	3,658	12.09%	New
SWA	C. M. Bheemaiah	3,496	11.56%	New
ABJS	N. S. Nanaiah	832	2.75%	New
Margin of victory		8,319	27.50%	▲19.93
Turnout		32,100	59.60%	
Total valid votes		30,251		
Registered electors		53,859		
INC gain from PSP		Swing	▼3.23	

=== Assembly By-election 1959 ===
1959 Mysore State Legislative Assembly by-election : Virajpet
Party	Candidate	Votes	%	±%
PSP	K. P. Karumbaya	16,076	53.78%	▲8.63
INC	S. C. Ajjikuttira	13,814	46.22%	▼8.63
Margin of victory		2,262	7.57%	▼2.12
Total valid votes		29,890		
PSP gain from INC		Swing	▼1.07	

=== Assembly Election 1957 ===
1957 Mysore State Legislative Assembly election : Virajpet
Party	Candidate	Votes	%	±%
INC	C. M. Poonacha	18,223	54.85%	New
PSP	Kolera Karumbayya	15,002	45.15%	New
Margin of victory		3,221	9.69%	
Turnout		33,225	71.30%	
Total valid votes		33,225		
Registered electors		46,602		
INC win (new seat)				
