= Thakkadi Party =

Indian political party

- Founder: Pandyanda Belliappa
- Founded: 1951 (75 years ago)
- Dissolved: 1952 (74 years ago)
- Split from: Indian National Congress

Election symbol
- Weighing Scales

Thakkadi Party was a political faction that played a crucial role during the Coorg region's transition to Indian statehood in the early 1950s. The word "Thakkadi" translates to "Weighing Scales" in the local language, which was also the party's official election symbol. The party was led by Pandyanda Belliappa, a freedom fighter from the region. They were against the merger of Coorg with the neighbouring Mysore State and campaigned to keep Coorg as an independent state within the Indian Union. Belliappa entered politics in 1921 as a member of the Coorg Planters' Association. He later joined the Congress Party and became one of its members.

== Coorg state ==
In 1952, he separated from the Congress along with others and fought the Coorg state elections as independents while floating a new party called the Takkadi ('justice scales') party. The issue they fought against was the proposed merger of Coorg with Mysore. They lost the elections to the Congress, led by C M Poonacha, but won nine of the Assembly seats. The Takkadi party was a dominant political force and voice in Coorg with its anti-merger plank.

== The 1952 Elections ==
In 1951, the Constitution of India established the legislative assembly consisting of 24 members from 18 constituencies, of which six were two-member constituencies and twelve were single-member constituencies and lone election was held to the assembly in 1951–52. In Coorg's only Legislative Assembly election in 1952, the Thakkadi Party candidates contested as Independents such as the independence activist Pandyanda Belliappa (elected from Ammathi Nad Constituency). They contested against the Congress party, which supported the merger. The Congress party won 15 seats. The Thakkadi Party won 9 seats, becoming the main opposition.
