= Pandyanda Belliappa =

Indian politician

P. I. Belliappa
- Born: Pandyanda I Belliappa; Kodagu (Coorg), India
- Occupations: Freedom Fighter, Politician

Pandyanda I. Belliappa (or Pandianda I. Belliappa) was a Gandhian politician and freedom fighter from the state of Coorg.

== Freedom struggle ==
Belliappa entered politics in 1921 as a member of the Coorg Planters' Association. He later joined the Congress Party and became one of its members. A staunch Gandhian, satyagrahi and freedom fighter he courted arrest during the freedom struggle. His wife Pandyanda Seethamma Belliappa was also a freedom fighter who courted arrest. He was also the editor of a periodical called the 'Kodagu'. At his invitation, Mahatma Gandhi, his secretary Thakkar, the President of the Dalit Sangha, a German journalist, Miss Jamnalal Bajaj and others came to Gonikoppal in Coorg. Punit.

== Coorg state ==
In 1952, he separated from the Congress along with others and fought the Coorg state elections as independents while floating a new party called the Takkadi ('justice scales') party. The issue they fought against was the proposed merger of Coorg with Mysore. They lost the elections to the Congress, led by C M Poonacha, but won nine of the Assembly seats. The Thakkadi Party was a dominant political force and voice in Coorg with its anti-merger plank.
