= Madikeri Assembly constituency =

Legislative Assembly constituency in Karnataka State, India

Coordinates: 12.43°N 75.73°E

Madikeri
- Constituency No. 208 for the Karnataka Legislative Assembly

Constituency details
- Country: India
- Region: South India
- State: Karnataka
- District: Kodagu
- Lok Sabha constituency: Mysore
- Established: 1956
- Total electors: 232,799 (2023)
- Reservation: None

Member of Legislative Assembly
- 16th Karnataka Legislative Assembly
- Incumbent Mantar Gowda
- Party: Indian National Congress
- Elected year: 2023
- Preceded by: Appachu Ranjan

Madikeri Assembly constituency is one of the 224 Legislative Assembly constituencies of Karnataka in India.

It is part of Kodagu district and is one among the two legislative assembly constituency from the district.

Madekeri Mantar Gowda who won the 2023 Karnataka Legislative Assembly election is the current MLA from this constituency.

== Electorate ==
The constituency has 209,469 voters: 1.05 lakh women and 1.03 lakh men. The Scheduled Castes and Scheduled Tribes constitute roughly 20.5% of the electorate and the electorate is 79.8% rural. The electorate is predominantly Hindu with Muslims and Christians constituting less than 16% of the voter base. The constituency has more number of Gowdas (Are Bhashe and others) than Kodavas in contrast to Virajpet Assembly constituency.

== Members of the Legislative Assembly ==
Election	Member	Party
1957	K. Mallapa	Indian National Congress
1962	K. Mallapa	Indian National Congress
1967	A. P. Appanna	Indian National Congress
1972	A. M. Bellaippa	Indian National Congress
1978	M. C. Nanaiah	Indian National Congress
1983	M. C. Nanaiah	Indian National Congress
1985	D. A. Chinnappa	Indian National Congress
1989	D. A. Chinnappa	Indian National Congress
1994	Dambekodi Subbaya Madappa	Bharatiya Janata Party
1999	Mundanda M. Nanaiah	Indian National Congress
2004	K. G. Bopaiah	Bharatiya Janata Party
2008	Appachu Ranjan	Bharatiya Janata Party
2013	Appachu Ranjan	Bharatiya Janata Party
2018	Appachu Ranjan	Bharatiya Janata Party
2023	Dr. Mantar Gowda	Indian National Congress

== Election results ==
=== Assembly Election 2023 ===
2023 Karnataka Legislative Assembly election : Madikeri
Party	Candidate	Votes	%	±%
INC	Dr. Mantar Gowda	84,879	47.84%	▲25.29
BJP	Appachu Ranjan	80,477	45.36%	▲3.68
JD(S)	Napanda Muthappa	6,233	3.51%	▼28.72
NOTA	None of the above	1,516	0.85%	▼0.10
SDPI	Ameen Mohisin	1,436	0.81%	New
Margin of victory		4,402	2.48%	▼6.97
Turnout		177,447	76.22%	▼1.74
Total valid votes		177,416		
Registered electors		232,799		▲7.09
INC gain from BJP		Swing	▲6.16	

=== Assembly Election 2018 ===
2018 Karnataka Legislative Assembly election : Madikeri
Party	Candidate	Votes	%	±%
BJP	Appachu Ranjan	70,631	41.68%	▲1.86
JD(S)	B. A. Jivijaya	54,616	32.23%	▼4.34
INC	K. P. Chandrakala	38,219	22.55%	▼0.15
NOTA	None of the above	1,615	0.95%	New
ABHM	Bhargava. C. J	1,124	0.66%	New
Margin of victory		16,015	9.45%	▲6.20
Turnout		169,469	77.96%	▲2.07
Total valid votes		169,458		
Registered electors		217,386		▲7.17
BJP hold		Swing	▲1.86	

=== Assembly Election 2013 ===
2013 Karnataka Legislative Assembly election : Madikeri
Party	Candidate	Votes	%	±%
BJP	Appachu Ranjan	56,696	39.82%	▼7.24
JD(S)	B. A. Jivijaya	52,067	36.57%	▲29.88
INC	K. M. Lokesh	32,313	22.70%	▼19.20
KJP	N. N. Shambhulingappa	5,714	4.01%	New
Independent	Harish Puvaiah	1,537	1.08%	New
BSP	S. P. Mahadevappa	1,294	0.91%	▼0.25
Margin of victory		4,629	3.25%	▼1.91
Turnout		153,934	75.89%	▲5.82
Total valid votes		142,377		
Registered electors		202,851		▲11.32
BJP hold		Swing	▼7.24	

=== Assembly Election 2008 ===
2008 Karnataka Legislative Assembly election : Madikeri
Party	Candidate	Votes	%	±%
BJP	Appachu Ranjan	60,084	47.06%	▲9.45
INC	B. A. Jivijaya	53,499	41.90%	▲17.91
JD(S)	K. N. Vasanth	8,536	6.69%	▼21.21
Independent	Santhosh Kumar. M. V	1,632	1.28%	New
BSP	K. H. Vittala	1,483	1.16%	▼3.90
Margin of victory		6,585	5.16%	▼4.55
Turnout		127,683	70.07%	▲2.58
Total valid votes		127,682		
Registered electors		182,229		▲46.23
BJP hold		Swing	▲9.45	

=== Assembly Election 2004 ===
2004 Karnataka Legislative Assembly election : Madikeri
Party	Candidate	Votes	%	±%
BJP	K. G. Bopaiah	31,610	37.61%	▲14.83
JD(S)	Dambekodi Subbaya Madappa	23,446	27.90%	▲25.28
INC	Mundanda M. Nanaiah	20,159	23.99%	▼10.56
BSP	Kunhi Abdulla. K. M	4,252	5.06%	New
JP	Sanketh Poovaiah	3,765	4.48%	New
Kannada Nadu Party	Giri Uthappa	811	0.96%	New
Margin of victory		8,164	9.71%	▲3.58
Turnout		84,101	67.49%	▼2.50
Total valid votes		84,043		
Registered electors		124,616		▲9.25
BJP gain from INC		Swing	▲3.06	

=== Assembly Election 1999 ===
1999 Karnataka Legislative Assembly election : Madikeri
Party	Candidate	Votes	%	±%
INC	Mundanda M. Nanaiah	26,052	34.55%	▲17.23
Independent	Dambekodi Subbaya Madappa	21,432	28.42%	New
BJP	K. G. Bopaiah	17,178	22.78%	▼21.34
Independent	T. P. Ramesh	8,774	11.63%	New
JD(S)	Fiaz Ahamad	1,976	2.62%	New
Margin of victory		4,620	6.13%	▼8.64
Turnout		79,828	69.99%	▲1.59
Total valid votes		75,412		
Rejected ballots		4,398	5.51%	▲4.14
Registered electors		114,063		▲1.94
INC gain from BJP		Swing	▼9.57	

=== Assembly Election 1994 ===
1994 Karnataka Legislative Assembly election : Madikeri
Party	Candidate	Votes	%	±%
BJP	Dambekodi Subbaya Madappa	33,306	44.12%	▲11.55
JD	T. P. Ramesh	22,154	29.35%	▲12.81
INC	D. A. Chinnappa	13,072	17.32%	▼25.31
BSP	A. K. Subbaiah	5,997	7.94%	New
INC	B. J. Chinnappa (Sada)	694	0.92%	New
Margin of victory		11,152	14.77%	▲4.71
Turnout		76,539	68.40%	▲1.26
Total valid votes		75,491		
Rejected ballots		1,048	1.37%	▼3.73
Registered electors		111,895		▼1.34
BJP gain from INC		Swing	▲1.49	

=== Assembly Election 1989 ===
1989 Karnataka Legislative Assembly election : Madikeri
Party	Candidate	Votes	%	±%
INC	D. A. Chinnappa	30,804	42.63%	▼4.31
BJP	Dambekodi Subbaya Madappa	23,538	32.57%	▲25.06
JD	T. P. Ramesh	11,955	16.54%	New
JP	Kaliyanda. C. Nanaiah	2,597	3.59%	New
Independent	V. N. Subbaiah	1,738	2.41%	New
Independent	Baliyatanda. J. Chinnappa	890	1.23%	New
Margin of victory		7,266	10.06%	▲1.67
Turnout		76,146	67.14%	▼0.94
Total valid votes		72,260		
Rejected ballots		3,886	5.10%	▲3.91
Registered electors		113,413		▲25.01
INC hold		Swing	▼4.31	

=== Assembly Election 1985 ===
1985 Karnataka Legislative Assembly election : Madikeri
Party	Candidate	Votes	%	±%
INC	D. A. Chinnappa	28,645	46.94%	▲6.94
JP	Ajjikuttira. N. Somaiah	23,523	38.54%	▲21.88
BJP	Dambekodi Subbaya Madappa	4,581	7.51%	▼21.44
Independent	K. M. Aboodacker	3,519	5.77%	New
Margin of victory		5,122	8.39%	▼2.65
Turnout		61,765	68.08%	▲4.17
Total valid votes		61,031		
Rejected ballots		734	1.19%	▼0.49
Registered electors		90,725		▲9.83
INC hold		Swing	▲6.94	

=== Assembly Election 1983 ===
1983 Karnataka Legislative Assembly election : Madikeri
Party	Candidate	Votes	%	±%
INC	M. C. Nanaiah	20,762	40.00%	▲36.77
BJP	Chengapa. M. M	15,030	28.95%	New
JP	Merinda. C. Nanaiah	8,648	16.66%	▼22.55
AIML	B. A. Sumshuddin	5,091	9.81%	New
Independent	Ponnetty. K. Ponnappa	2,050	3.95%	New
Independent	Dambekodi Subbaya Madappa	328	0.63%	New
Margin of victory		5,732	11.04%	▲6.02
Turnout		52,797	63.91%	▼12.13
Total valid votes		51,909		
Rejected ballots		888	1.68%	▼0.09
Registered electors		82,608		▲7.76
INC gain from INC(I)		Swing	▼4.23	

=== Assembly Election 1978 ===
1978 Karnataka Legislative Assembly election : Madikeri
Party	Candidate	Votes	%	±%
INC(I)	M. C. Nanaiah	25,327	44.23%	New
JP	A. K. Subbaiah	22,453	39.21%	New
Independent	Dembekodi Subraiah Madappa	4,488	7.84%	New
CPI(M)	B. N. Kuttappa	3,144	5.49%	New
INC	A. M. Bellaippa	1,849	3.23%	▼57.05
Margin of victory		2,874	5.02%	▼35.26
Turnout		58,292	76.04%	▲21.02
Total valid votes		57,261		
Rejected ballots		1,031	1.77%	▲1.77
Registered electors		76,660		▼0.02
INC(I) gain from INC		Swing	▼16.05	

=== Assembly Election 1972 ===
1972 Mysore State Legislative Assembly election : Madikeri
Party	Candidate	Votes	%	±%
INC	A. M. Bellaippa	24,442	60.28%	▲20.40
INC(O)	D. A. Chinnappa	8,109	20.00%	New
ABJS	Pokkulanda Appaji	6,689	16.50%	New
SWA	K. D. Kariappa	680	1.68%	New
Independent	P. C. Rosy John	628	1.55%	New
Margin of victory		16,333	40.28%	▲21.19
Turnout		42,189	55.02%	▼12.21
Total valid votes		40,548		
Registered electors		76,674		▲44.09
INC hold		Swing	▲20.40	

=== Assembly Election 1967 ===
1967 Mysore State Legislative Assembly election : Madikeri
Party	Candidate	Votes	%	±%
INC	A. P. Appanna	12,977	39.88%	▼9.27
Independent	M. C. Nanayya	6,766	20.79%	New
CPI	Y. T. Aiyappa	6,072	18.66%	▼1.24
Independent	B. D. Appaya	4,603	14.14%	New
PSP	K. P. Karu-baya	1,858	5.71%	▲4.02
Independent	F. M. Khan	267	0.82%	New
Margin of victory		6,211	19.09%	▼5.46
Turnout		35,772	67.23%	▼1.92
Total valid votes		32,543		
Registered electors		53,212		▼14.95
INC hold		Swing	▼9.27	

=== Assembly Election 1962 ===
1962 Mysore State Legislative Assembly election : Madikeri
Party	Candidate	Votes	%	±%
INC	K. Mallapa	19,914	49.15%	▼2.55
SWA	B. D. Appaiah	9,969	24.60%	New
CPI	B. N. Kuttappa	8,062	19.90%	▼18.66
ABJS	B. A. Ganapaiah	1,886	4.65%	New
PSP	K. M. Poduval	686	1.69%	New
Margin of victory		9,945	24.55%	▲11.41
Turnout		43,264	69.15%	▲1.37
Total valid votes		40,517		
Registered electors		62,567		▲9.42
INC hold		Swing	▼2.55	

=== Assembly Election 1957 ===
1957 Mysore State Legislative Assembly election : Madikeri
Party	Candidate	Votes	%	±%
INC	K. Mallapa	20,039	51.70%	New
CPI	Y. T. Aiyappa	14,947	38.56%	New
Independent	D. S. Devashetty	3,772	9.73%	New
Margin of victory		5,092	13.14%	
Turnout		38,758	67.78%	
Total valid votes		38,758		
Registered electors		57,178		
INC win (new seat)				

== See also ==
- List of constituencies of the Karnataka Legislative Assembly
- Kodagu district
- Mysore Lok Sabha constituency
