= Virajpet =

Virajpet ವಿರಾಜ್ಪೆಟ್ Virarajendra Pete
- Town
- Location in Karnataka, India Virajpet (India)
- Coordinates: 12°11′48.184″N 75°48′12.359″E
- Country: India
- State: Karnataka
- District: Kodagu
- Veera Rajendra Pete: 1792
- Founder: Dodda Vira Rajendra

Government
  - Body: Town Municipal Council
  - Administrator: Nithin Chakki _{K.A.S}
  - Chief Officer: P K Nachappa
  - MLA: A S Ponnanna

Area
  - Town: 9.02 km^{2} (3.48 sq mi)
  - Rural: 1,643.61 km^{2} (634.60 sq mi)
- Elevation: 909 m (2,982 ft)

Population (2022)
  - Town: 21,058
  - Density: 2,330/km^{2} (6,050/sq mi)
  - Rural: 184,185

Languages
  - Official: Kannada
- Time zone: UTC+5:30 (IST)
- PIN: 571 218
- Telephone code: 08274
- ISO 3166 code: IN-KA
- Vehicle registration: KA-12
- Website: www.virajpettown.mrc.gov.in

Virajpet, also spelled Virājapete (Kodava: [ʋiraːdʒɐpeːʈe]), is a town in the district of Kodagu, in India's southern State of Karnataka. It is the main town of the Virajpet taluka, south of the district, and borders Kerala State. The name of the town is derived from its founder, Dodda Vira Rajendra.

== History ==
The name Virajpet is a shorter version of its previous name ,Virarajendrapet, named after the Haleri King Dodda Vira Rajendra, who founded the town in 1792. He established the town to commemorate his meeting with General Robert Abercromby, his ally against Tipu Sultan (the ruler of the Kingdom of Mysore), in 1791. Virajpet was the headquarters of the Yedenalknad taluk. The first population comprised people who Vira Rajendra had, in his predatory excursions, swept away from Mysore. But, the people that fled to Virajpet were principally the inhabitants of Periyapatna, who were looking for protection when their town was destroyed by Tipu Sultan to prevent its falling into the hands of the British.

Lieutenant Connor in his 1870 memoir titled Memoir of the Codugu Survey, noted that Virajpet was "a large straggling town containing about 500 houses, and although the whole permanent trade of the country is centered here, there are but few symptoms of either affluence or growing prosperity; having no manufactures, its chief support must be in traffic, for this, its situation is particularly advantageous, fitting it in a great measure for being a staple between Mysore and the Western coast". He noted that a fair takes place every Friday and was "the largest of the periodical markets held in the country". He added, "all the produce of the southern parts is brought here for sale, also that of the districts in its vicinity, it being the principal place from which they are exported. The neighbouring inhabitants of Mysore resort here in great number. Rice is the chief article which they take away with them."

During the independence movement, Mahatma Gandhi visited the town in 1934 and addressed a public gathering.

== Geography ==
=== Climate and rainfall ===
Virajpet has a hot and wet type of climate. The town receives moderately high rainfall. Summer during April and May is hot, with daily maximum temperature reaching over 34 °C. Temperature reduces with the onset of monsoons in the month of June. Winters are cold with daily minimum temperatures hovering around 10 °C to 15 °C. In 2022, Virajpet received annual rainfall of 2,587 millimetres (101.9 in). It falls under the drainage basin of west flowing rivers, as its terrain is inclined towards the west, and contributes less to the Kaveri river basin.

== Demographics ==
Virajpet had a population of 17,246 as per the 2011 Census of India. The number of males was 8,724, and females 8,522, thus a gender ratio of 977 females to 1,000 males. Virajpet's literacy rate was 93.12%, significantly higher than the national average of 74.04%. The rate among males was 92.75%, and 95.46% in females. 1,641 in number, 9.52% of the population were under the age of six.

== Civic administration ==
Virajpet Town officials
President	T. R. Sushmitha
Vice-president	Vinank Kuttappa

The Virajpet Nagar Panchayat is the municipality in charge of the civic and infrastructural assets of the town. Virajpet has a town area of 8.26 km^{2} (3.19 sq mi). The municipal council consists of 18 elected representatives, called councillors, one from each of the 18 wards (localities) of the town. A councillor from the majority party is selected as a president. The council initially met at the Town Hall, which was built in 1932, before it was expanded in 1956. However, the council then met in another building constructed for the purpose, which also housed the administrative staff associated with the municipality.

For elections to the Lok Sabha, Virajpet falls under the Mysore constituency. Prior to revision of the constituencies by the Delimitation commission in 2008, the town came under Mangalore constituency. For elections to the State Legislative Assembly, the town falls under the constituency that, apart from the town, includes the surrounding villages, and sends one member to the assembly.

== Transportation ==
Both Karnataka and Kerala operate government-run buses to Virajpet towards Kannur, Bangalore, Ernakulam, Hassan, and Madikeri. Intra-district connectivity is maintained by private-run buses. Virajpet does not have railway connectivity. The nearest railway stations are Thalassery and Kannur in Kerala, at a distance of 80 kilometres (50 mi) each. Mysore is the nearest major railway station in Karnataka at 105 kilometres (65 mi).

The nearest airports are the Kannur International Airport in Kerala and the Mangalore International Airport, at 59 kilometres (37 mi) and 172 kilometres (107 mi), respectively. Also, the Kozhikode International Airport and the Bangalore Kempegowda International Airport are at a distance of 167 kilometres (104 mi) and 282 kilometres (175 mi), respectively, from the town.

=== Highways ===
No national highways pass through the town of Virajpet. It can be reached by state highways SH-90, SH-27, and SH-91.

== See also ==
- Aimangala
- Madikeri
- Mangalore
- Virajpet Assembly constituency
- Kushalanagar
- Somwarpet
- Iritty
