= Coorg State =

Coordinates: 12.4208°N 75.7397°E

- Former State 1950–1956
- Location of Coorg State in India
- Country: India
- Region: South India
- Formation: 26 January 1950
- Dissolution: 1 November 1956

Government
  - Chief Minister
  - 1952-1956: C. M. Poonacha
- Time zone: UTC+05:30 (IST)
Preceded by	Succeeded by
Coorg Province	Mysore State

Coorg State was a Part-C state in India which existed from 1950 to 1956. When the Constitution of India came into force on 26 January 1950, most of the existing provinces were reconstituted into states. Thus, Coorg Province became Coorg State. Coorg State was ruled by a Chief Commissioner with Mercara as its capital. The head of the government was the Chief Minister. Coorg State was abolished on 1 November 1956 as per the States Reorganisation Act, 1956 and its territory was merged with Mysore State (later renamed as Karnataka in 1973). Currently, Coorg forms a district of Karnataka state.

== Commissioners of Coorg State ==
(1) Dewan Bahadur Ketolira Chengappa, became its first Chief Commissioner from 1947–1949

(2) C.T. Mudaliar became Chief Commissioner from 1949–1950

(3) Kanwar Baba Daya Singh Bedi, Chief Commissioner from 1950–1956

== Government of Coorg ==
Government was formed in Coorg by Indian National Congress, who won 15 of 24 seats. Cabinet was formed with two ministers (including Chief Minister), which lasted till States Reorganisation Act on 1 November 1956.

=== Chief Minister ===
Cheppudira Muthana Poonacha won from Berriathnad constituency became the first and last Chief Minister of Coorg State from 1952 till 1956.

Map of Southern India before the States Reorganisation Act of 1956 with Coorg State in dark green

=== Cabinet ===
- Cheppudira Muthana Poonacha, who was the Chief Minister took the charge of Ministry of Finance for Coorg State.
- Kuttur Mallappa (elected to the assembly from the Sanivarsanthe constituency became the Home Minister of Coorg State

== Dissolution ==
As a result of the States Reorganisation Act of 1 November 1956, when India's state boundaries were reorganised, Coorg State became a district of the then Mysore State Mysore State was later renamed as Karnataka and part of the historical region of Coorg now forms the Kodagu district of Karnataka.

== See also ==
- History of Kodagu
- Captivity of Coorgis at Seringapatam
