= Kakana Kote =

- Directed by: C. R. Simha
- Written by: Masti Venkatesh Iyengar
- Screenplay by: Girish Karnad
- Produced by: M. R. Jayaraj; M. C. Satyanarayana
- Starring: Lokesh; Lokanath; Srinath; Girija Lokesh
- Cinematography: Ishan Arya
- Edited by: Bal G. Yadav
- Music by: C. Ashwath
- Production company: Raj-N-Raj Combines
- Release date: 1977
- Running time: 127 minutes
- Country: India
- Language: Kannada

Kakana Kote is a 1977 Indian Kannada biographical drama film adapted from Masti Venkatesh Iyengar's stage play of the same name. The film plot tells the story of Kaka Nayaka who was instrumental in stopping the exploitation of tribal people in Mysore district against the tax payment from middlemen who were representing the ruling kingdom government.

The film was directed by acclaimed theater artist C. R. Simha and the music was composed by C. Ashwath. The film featured seasoned actors such as Lokesh, Lokanath, Srinath and Girija Lokesh in the lead roles. The film was critically acclaimed and premiered in many film festivals. It went on to win the third Best Film award at the Karnataka State Film Awards. The screenplay and dialogues were written by Girish Karnad and associate directed by Girish Kasaravalli.

== Cast ==
- Lokesh as Kaka Nayaka
- Srinath
- Lokanath
- Krishnaraj
- Lavanya
- Girija Lokesh
- Venkatachala
- Vasudeva Murthy

== Soundtrack ==
The music of the film was composed by C. Ashwath. This was his first independent film work without his collaboration with L. Vaidyanathan.

Track listing
No.	Title	Lyrics	Singer(s)	Length
1.	"Bettada Thudiyalli"	Venkatesh Iyengar	C. Ashwath
2.	"Kari Haidanemboru"	Venkatesh Iyengar	B. V. Karanth, G. K. Venkatesh & C. Ashwath
3.	"Ondu Dina Kari Haida"	Venkatesh Iyengar	C. Ashwath
4.	"Nesara Nodu"	Venkatesh	Sulochana
5.	"So Yennire"	Venkatesh Iyengar	Chorus

== Awards ==
- Karnataka State Film Awards
1. Best Third Film
2. Best Story Writer - Masti Venkatesha Iyengar
3. Best Editing - Bal G. Yadav

== See also ==
- Kakanakote - A tribal forest place situated in Mysore district.
