= Mathanda Appachu =

Native military leader in a South Asian battle

Diwan Mathanda Appachu
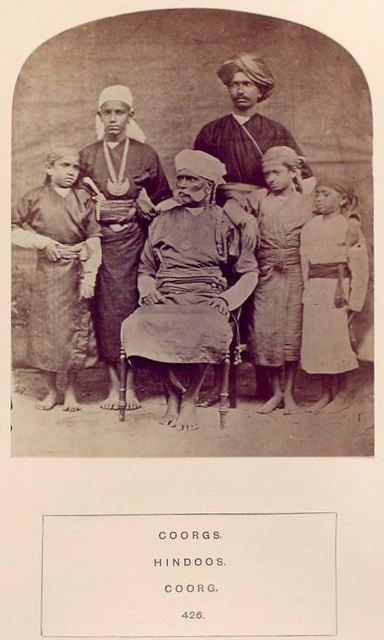
- Coorgs: Grandfather, father and sons (Karicha, his son Mathanda Appachu and four sons of Appachu)
- Pronunciation: Maa-thanda Appach'chu
- Born: Bollumad Village, Beppunaad Kingdom of Coorg (present day Kodagu)
- Died: 1875; Madikeri
- Resting place: Bollumad (Kodava name for the Kannada Bellumadu)
- Occupation: military leader
- Known for: Coorg War
- Children: 4 sons (Chengappa, Nanjappa, Belliappa and Poovaiah)
- Father: Karicha

Mathanda Appachu was an Indian warrior and freedom fighter. He was an officer in Chikka Vira Rajendra's army. He was from Bollumad village in Beppunad in Kodagu. He was also known as Madanta Appachu. He defeated the British in battle in 1834.

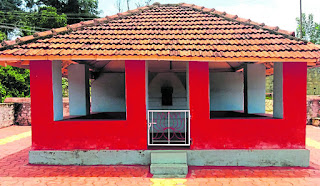
Mathanda family memorial, Bollmad (Bellumadu) village, Kodagu. Mathanda Appachu was buried nearby in a Shaiva tomb.

== Battle of Somwarpet, 1834 ==
In 1834, the British East India Company invaded Kodagu (then known as Coorg). The British army consisted of more than 6000 men and was divided into four columns who entered Kodagu from different directions.

On third April, one of the four columns entered Kodagu via Kodlipet and marched towards Haringi. They came to a village guarded by a stockade. This village was under the charge of Mathanda Appachu and his men. The Column was led by Major Bird. For four and a half hours, the British tried to pass the village but were unable to.

The British came under heavy firing. Col Mill, Ensign Robertson and Ensign Babington were among the 48 killed in the British force. 118 others were wounded in the invading column.

No casualties were reported from Mathanda Appachu's side. Major Bird led his remaining men and quickly retreated several miles to try another route.

== Coorg War, 1834 ==
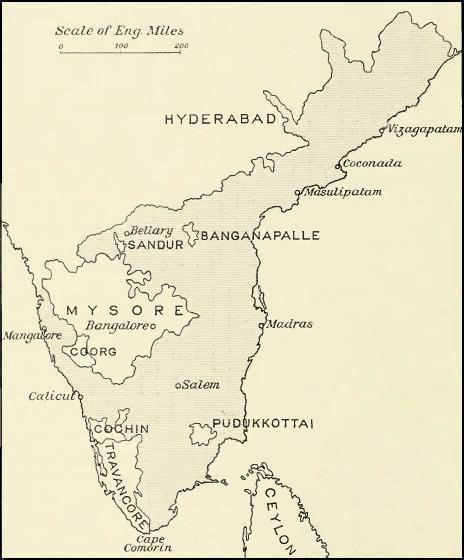
Coorg during the British Raj

On behalf of Chikka Vira Rajendra the Raja, Diwan Lakshminarayana and Mahomed Taker Khan made peace with the British on 4th April and Diwan Bopu surrendered on 5th April.

Col Fraser was led into Madikeri fort on 6th April. On 10th April, the Raja and his wives left Nalknad palace and entered Madikeri to surrender to the British.

== See also ==
- Coorg War
