= Margaret Stephen Kennedy =

Scottish missionary

Margaret Kennedy
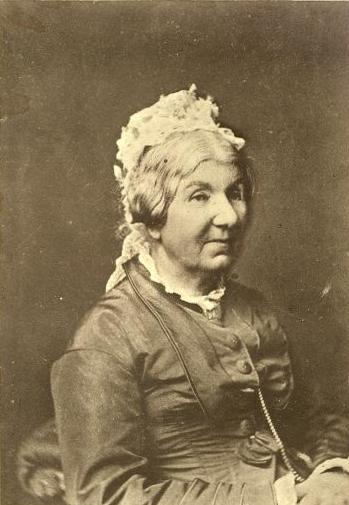
- Born: January 18, 1814; Aberdeen, Scotland
- Died: May 23, 1891 (aged 77)
- Known for: Missionary Service in India
- Notable work: Educating Victoria Gouramma, helping superintend school and run orphanage in Benares, and work in Leper Asylum in Almora
- Spouse: James Kennedy

Margaret Stephen Kennedy (January 18, 1814, Aberdeen, Scotland – May 23, 1891) was one of the first zenana missionaries in India in the mid nineteenth century. She is most known for her ability to connect with people along all classes and races, her work for the London Missionary Society orphanage in Benares, contributing aid to a leper sanctuary in Almora, and providing an English and Biblical education to the Raja of Coorg’s daughter, Victoria Gouramma.

== Early life ==
Margaret Kennedy was born in on January 18, 1814. She was the youngest of four daughters to be born to John Walker, a businessman and a conservative Presbyterian minister. Kennedy grew up a Christian, but did not accept the Gospel until age 13 when she had a divine revelation. Kennedy’s faith was influenced by the teachings of both by her father and favorite priest, Mr. Aitken. When reflecting back on her experience with religion as a child, Kennedy wrote she remembers hating Sundays due to the long, boring, and gloomy ordeal of reciting verses and listening to the Bible being read for hours.

As a young adult, Kennedy started a Sunday school of her own in Aberdeen where she combined her knowledge of the Bible and desire to make religion accessible and engaging for children. During this same time period Kennedy’s father suffered financial losses due to bad business dealings, and she pursued teaching as a way to help the family.

== Education ==
Margaret Kennedy was educated in what was believed to be the best school for young women in Aberdeen in the nineteenth century. She also and spent a lot of time reading books in her father’s library. Kennedy particularly loved theological books, and her favorite book was Pilgrim’s Progress by John Bunyan.

== Personal life ==
After traveling to become a missionary in India, Kennedy married a Scottish London Missionary Society reverend named James Kennedy on May 1, 1840, in Benares, India. They worked as missionaries together throughout the rest of Margaret’s life. Kennedy had at least six children, two of whom died in Benares between the years 1850–1853. She was a devoted mother throughout her life and spent much time raising her children and was very intent on giving them a thorough English and Biblical education. Kennedy was very close to her sister, Eliza Ann Buyers, with whom she worked with in Benares.

== Missionary service ==
=== Work in Benares ===
Kennedy journeyed from Aberdeen in 1838 with her sister and brother-in-law, Eliza Ann and William Buyers to start missionary work in Benares, India for the London Missionary Society. She began her life as a missionary by running Sunday school and working with orphans. During her early years of working in Benares, she became fluent in both Hindi and Hindustani. She started a day school for girls which by the end of 1840 had grown to encompass sixty students. She married James Kennedy in 1840, and continued working with the schools and the orphanage.

During the years 1847-1859 Kennedy personally instructed the Raja of Coorg’s daughter, also known as Chikka Viarajendra. The princess was most likely sent to the school for a Christian education in order to give her father a better standing with the British while he was being held as a state prisoner in Benares. The Kennedys accepted no money nor gifts from the Raja in order to demonstrate good, Christian values. Margaret Kennedy taught the princess needlework, English, and the Bible alongside her own children. At the end of 1849, the Kennedys returned to England due to James Kennedy’s poor health. The princess stayed in Benares, and Margaret never saw her again. The princess was eventually taken to England under Queen Victoria’s care and baptized and given the name Victoria Gouramma.

Kennedy returned to Benares in 1854 to resume missionary work. Her husband became the superintendent of the London Missionary Society’s school in Benares, and Margaret spent time teaching children at the school. Kennedy devoted much of her time to working people, especially women and children from all social and ethnic backgrounds, spending as much time as possible with young women. Kennedy and her children left Benares in 1857 due to the Indian Mutiny and did not return until 1859. Upon returning, Kennedy continued her work, preaching and working with her day school, as she focused her work especially among native women. She is considered one of the first zenana missionaries in India.

=== Work in Almora ===
In 1867 the Kennedys were transferred to Almora. Margaret spent much of her time in Almora preaching to and taking care of Leper women in the Leper Asylum.

=== Work in Ranee Khet ===
In 1869 the Kennedys were sent to start a new mission in Ranee Khet, about 20 miles from Almora, at the orders if the directors of the London Missionary Society. In Ranee Khet, Margaret started another Sunday school and devoted her time to converting unmarried, young native women. Kennedy and her husband worked with other missionaries who were members of the American Episcopal Methodist Church while stationed in Ranee Khet and encouraged other missionaries from differing denominations to cooperate.

== Death ==
After returning to England at the end of March 1877, Margaret Kennedy spent some time in Edinburg to be near one of her sons until 1882. Margaret then spent the rest of her retired life helping the elderly, sick, poor, and mothers in Acton. During the harsh winters of 1890–91, Margaret Kennedy strove to help poor members of her community, she attended her last annual meeting of the London Missionary Society 14 and 15 May 1891. she contracted bronchitis and died peacefully at 9:20 am on May 23, 1891, surrounded by her family.

== Legacy and ideology ==
Kennedy devoted about forty years of her life to missionary work in India. Although she was Presbyterian and helped her husband work for the London Missionary Society, She believed in churches uniting to help others. Kennedy also believed friendship and love could unite people among all races and classes. In addition, she learned the native language and spent much of her time in India with the locals. All of these qualities enabled her to be a successful missionary, although she may not have left tangible accomplishments. Some of her lasting accomplishments include educating the Coorgi Princess, helping to superintend a school in Benares, starting schools for girls wherever she could, and helping her husband run the London Missionary Society’s orphanage in Benares.
