= Nalknad Palace =

Palace in Karnataka, India

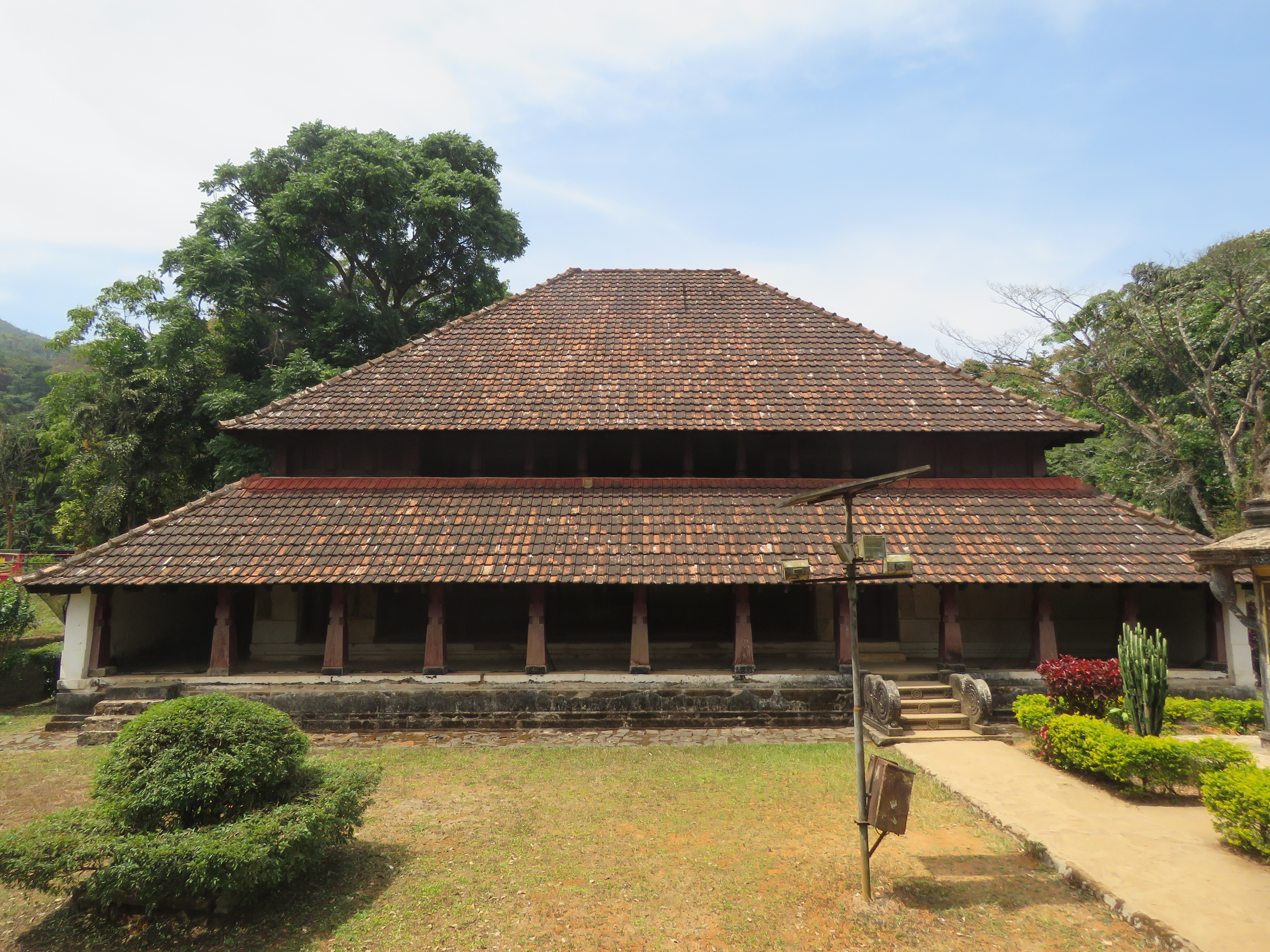

General information
- Architectural style: Kerala Architecture
- Location: Kodagu District, Karnataka
- Year built: 1792-94

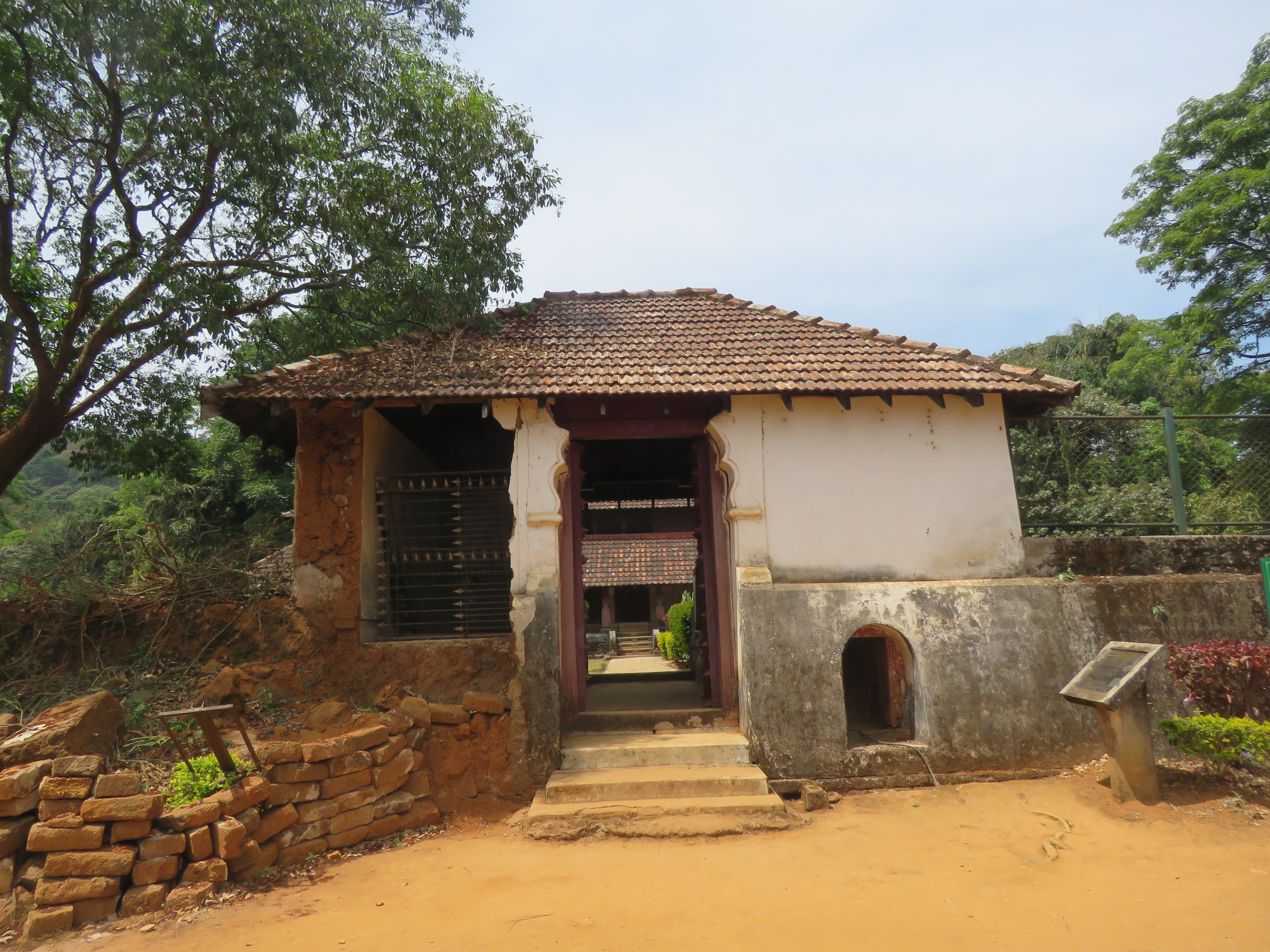
Palace entrance

Nalknad Palace or Nalkunadu (Kannada: ನಾಲ್ಕುನಾಡು ಅರಮನೆ, Nalkunadu / Nalnad aramane), called Naalnaad Aramane in the local Kodava language, is a palace located in the Kodagu district of the Indian state of Karnataka. It is located near a village named Yavakapadi and was built between the years 1792 and 1794 AD. This palace was the last refuge of the last of the Haleri kings of Kodagu, Chikka Veerarajendra before he was deposed by the British. The Kannada film Shanti, which has only a single actor, was shot in the surroundings of the palace.

== History ==
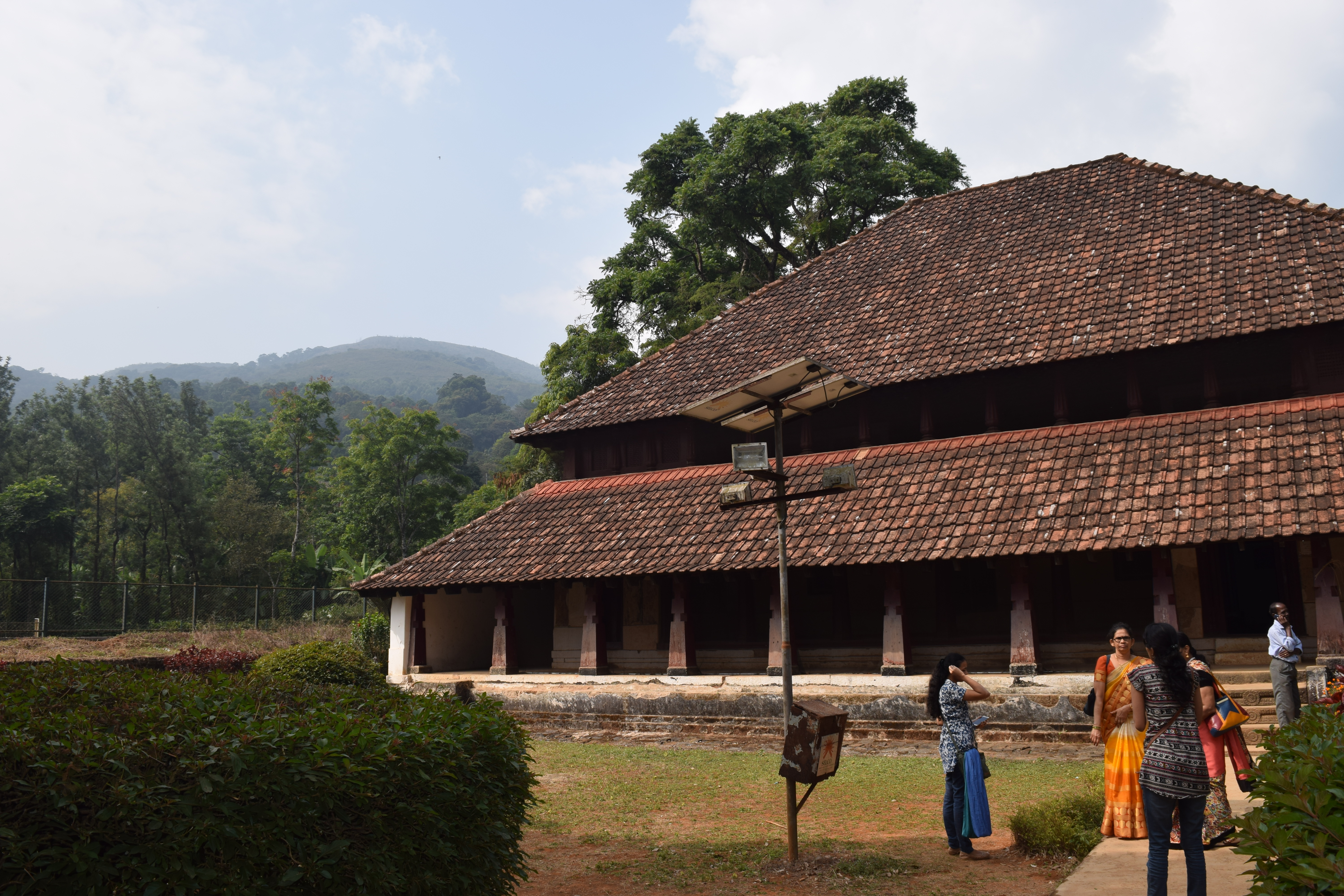
Renovated Nalknad Palace

After the death of the Kodagu king, Lingaraja I in 1780 AD, Hyder Ali took control of Kodagu under the pretext of being a guardian to Lingaraja's three sons, Dodda Vira Rajendra, Linga Rajendra and Appanna, who were of tender age. The princes were sent to reside in a fort at Gorur in Hassan district, and a garrison was stationed at Mercara (capital of Kodagu). A minister, Amaldar Subbarasaya, who was formerly a Karnika (treasurer) of the Kodagu Raja, was appointed to look after the administration of Kodagu. The people and nobles of Kodagu were greatly alarmed at the takeover of Kodagu by Hyder Ali. They suspected that Hyder Ali had evil intentions with regard to the young princes and the royal family, and that he would treat them the same way as he was treating the Wodeyar royal family of neighbouring Mysore, which also had been taken over in the same way by Hyder Ali, as guardian of an underage prince. Rebellion therefore began to brew against Hyder Ali among the Kodava nobility, and the opportunity came two years later, in 1782. At that time, Hyder Ali was busy fighting against the British, and the Kodava nobility managed to throw the garrison out of Kodagu and proclaim their independence. However, the underage princes could not be rescued from the custody of Hyder Ali and continued to reside under his "protection" in Gorur fort.

In December 1782, within a few months of the Kodava rebellion, Hyder Ali died and was succeeded by his son, Tipu Sultan. Tipu moved the Kodagu princes from Gorur to Periyapatna and placed them under explicit arrest, closely monitoring them. Yet, Prince Dodda Vira rajendra managed to escape in 1786 (after six years' "protection") and returned to Kodagu. He was welcomed by the nobles and promptly had himself proclaimed king. The capital of his kingdom, Madikere (Mercara) was under the occupation of Tipu's Army, but large swathes of his former kingdom, controlled by loyal nobles, paid allegiance to him. He started to wage battles against Tipu Sultan's army, which forced Tipu to send a large force to Kodagu to subdue the king. Tipu Sultan's army was able to capture some forts but suffered heavy losses as well.

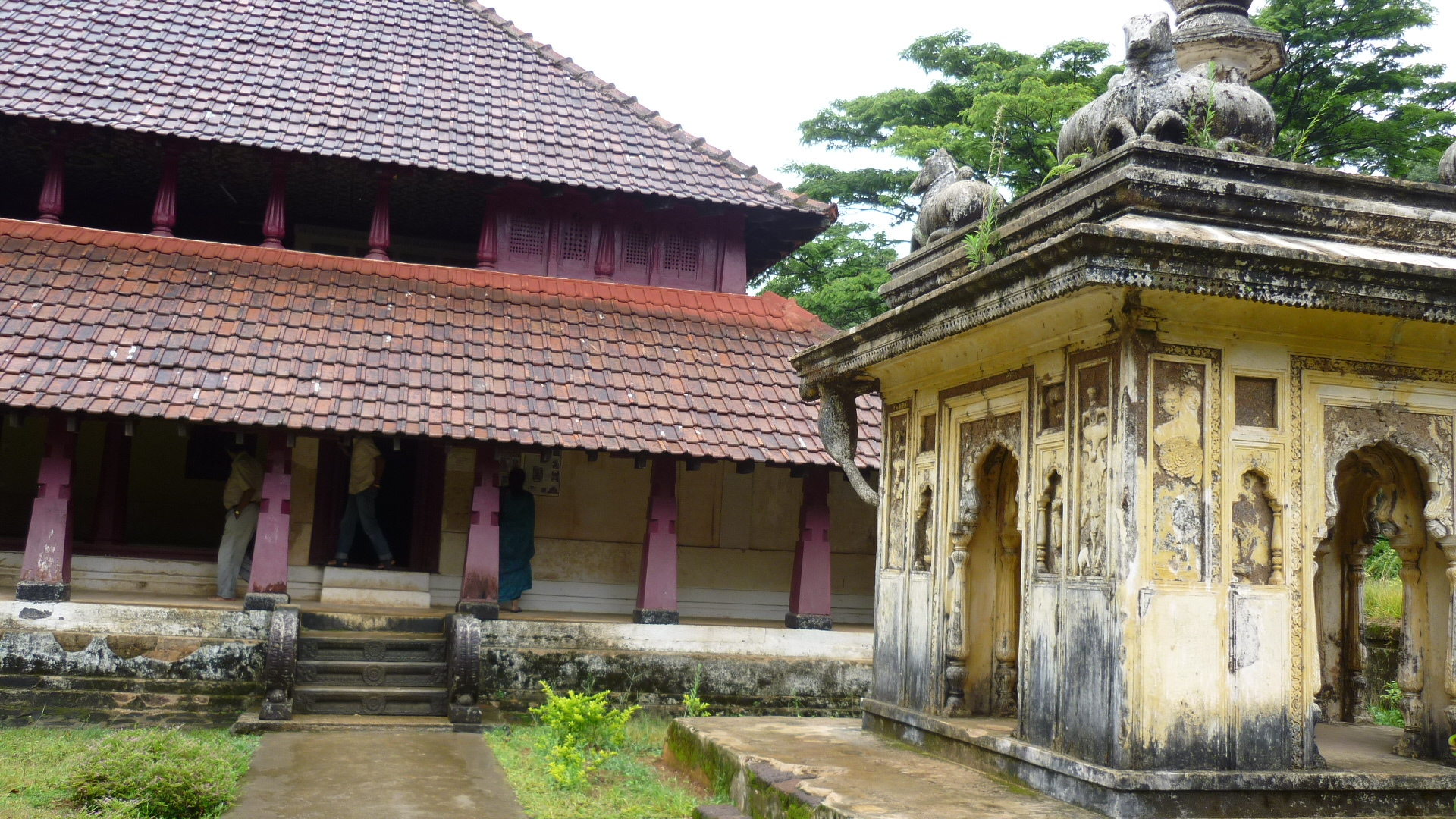
Palace and Kalyana Mantapa

Dodda Veerarajendra managed to recapture most of his forts, except Mercara, the capital. Instead, he made his base in a thickly forested area called Nalknad and launched his operations from there. Here at Nalknad, Dodda Virarajendra built himself the Nalknad Palace, a two-storeyed structure constructed in the style typical to its region. In 1793, he travelled to Cannanore to meet Sir Robert Abercromby and conclude a treaty with the British. After this agreement, Vira Rajendra became a steadfast ally of the British, in opposition to Tipu Sultan.

Dodda Veerarajendra had two queens, and his second marriage, to Mahadevammaji, was celebrated in Nalknad Palace in 1796. His queens gave him four surviving daughters but no sons, to his great regret. Meanwhile, his two younger brothers had secured their release from Tipu's clutches and made their way to their brother's base in Nalknad. They were the heirs to the kingdom if Dodda Virarajendra failed to produce a son. Dodda Virarajendra's second wife Mahadevamma died in 1807, and this seems to have had a profound effect on him. When Dodda Veerarajendra died in 1809, his ten-year-old daughter Devammaji was declared as the "Queen of Kodagu" and she was married to Mallappa (or Mallappa Gowda). However, in 1811, Linga Rajendra II, the younger brother of the deceased king, proclaimed himself as the king of Kodagu and ruled the region till his death in 1820. Chikka Vira Rajendra, the son of Linga Rajendra, became the king of Kodagu. In 1832, differences began to rise between the king and the British, forcing the king to start a war against the British. The British attacked Kodagu with full force and began to make inroads. Chikka Veerarajendra moved to Nalknad Palace which became his last refuge. In order to prevent major losses, the king had to surrender and the British deposed him to Benares. With this, Kodagu came under the direct rule of the British and Chikka Veerarajendra the last king of Kodagu was sent into exile.

== Protection and renovation ==
The palace is a protected monument under the aegis of the Directorate of Archaeology and Museums, Government of Karnataka. It was renovated by INTACH. There is a proposal to make the palace into a major tourist spot by converting a part of it as a museum to display the crafts of the Kodagu region. A sum of Rs. 2.29 million was spent on renovating the palace.

== Gallery ==
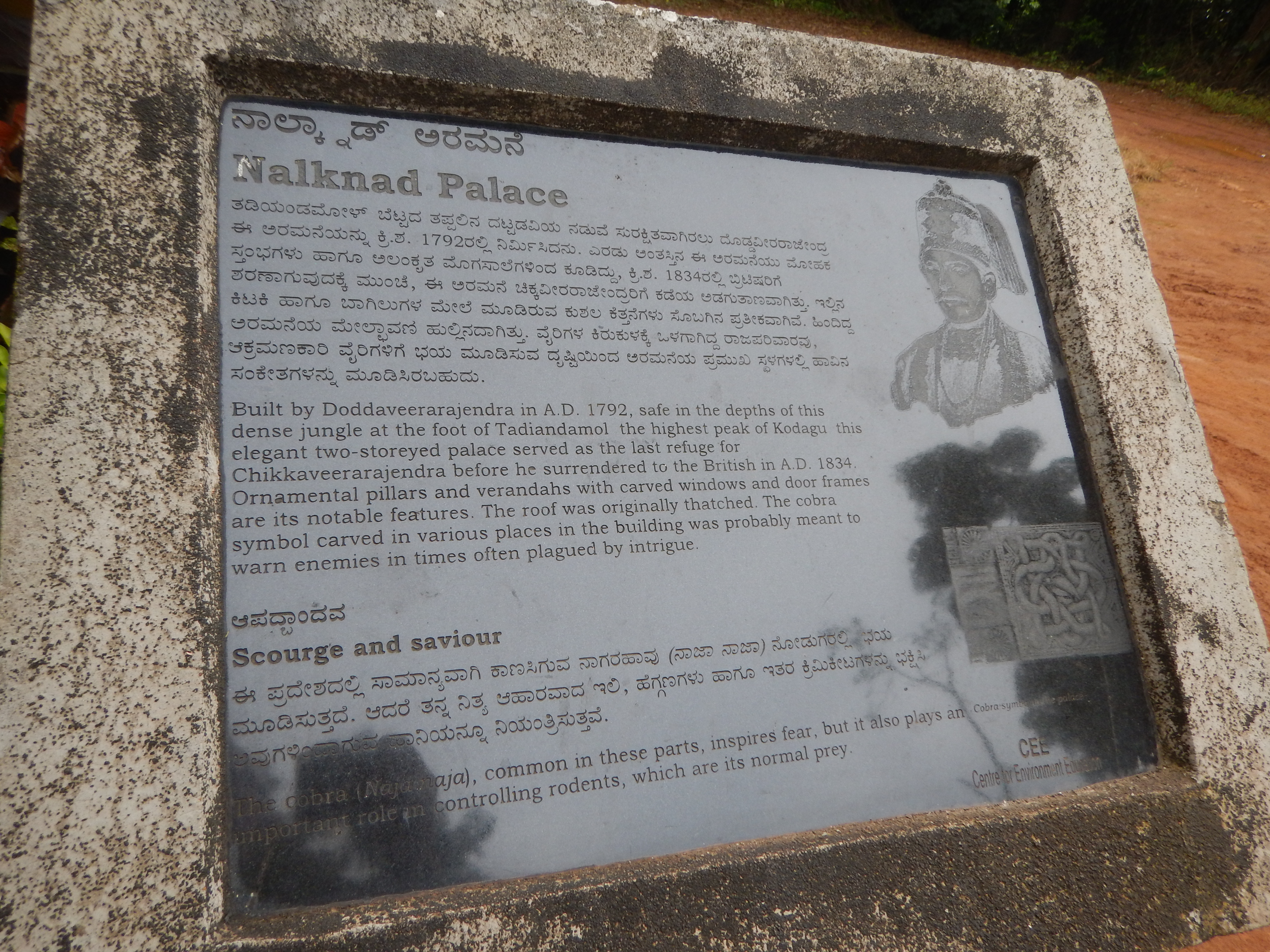
Plaque at the entrance of the palace

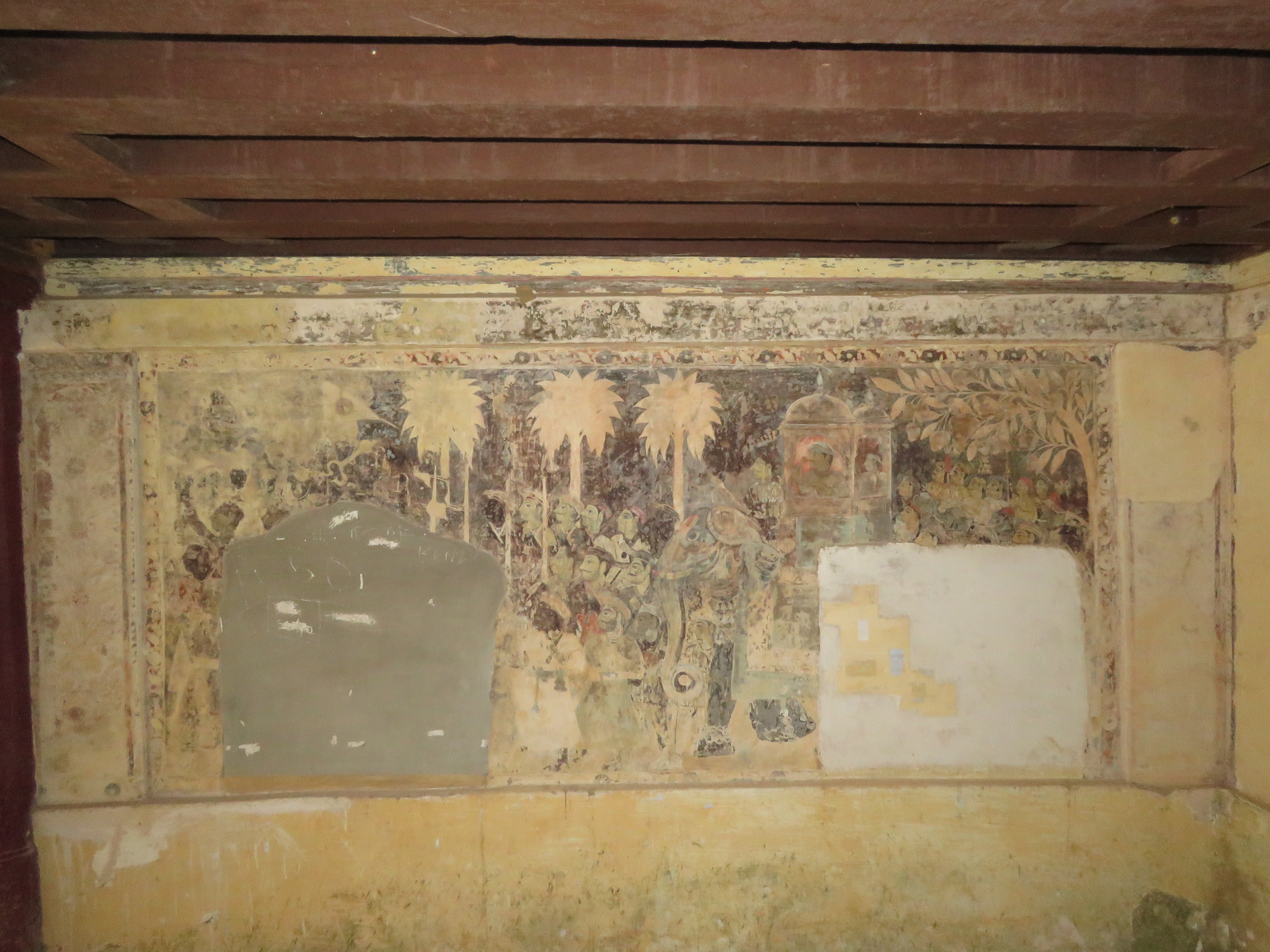
Mural inside the palace

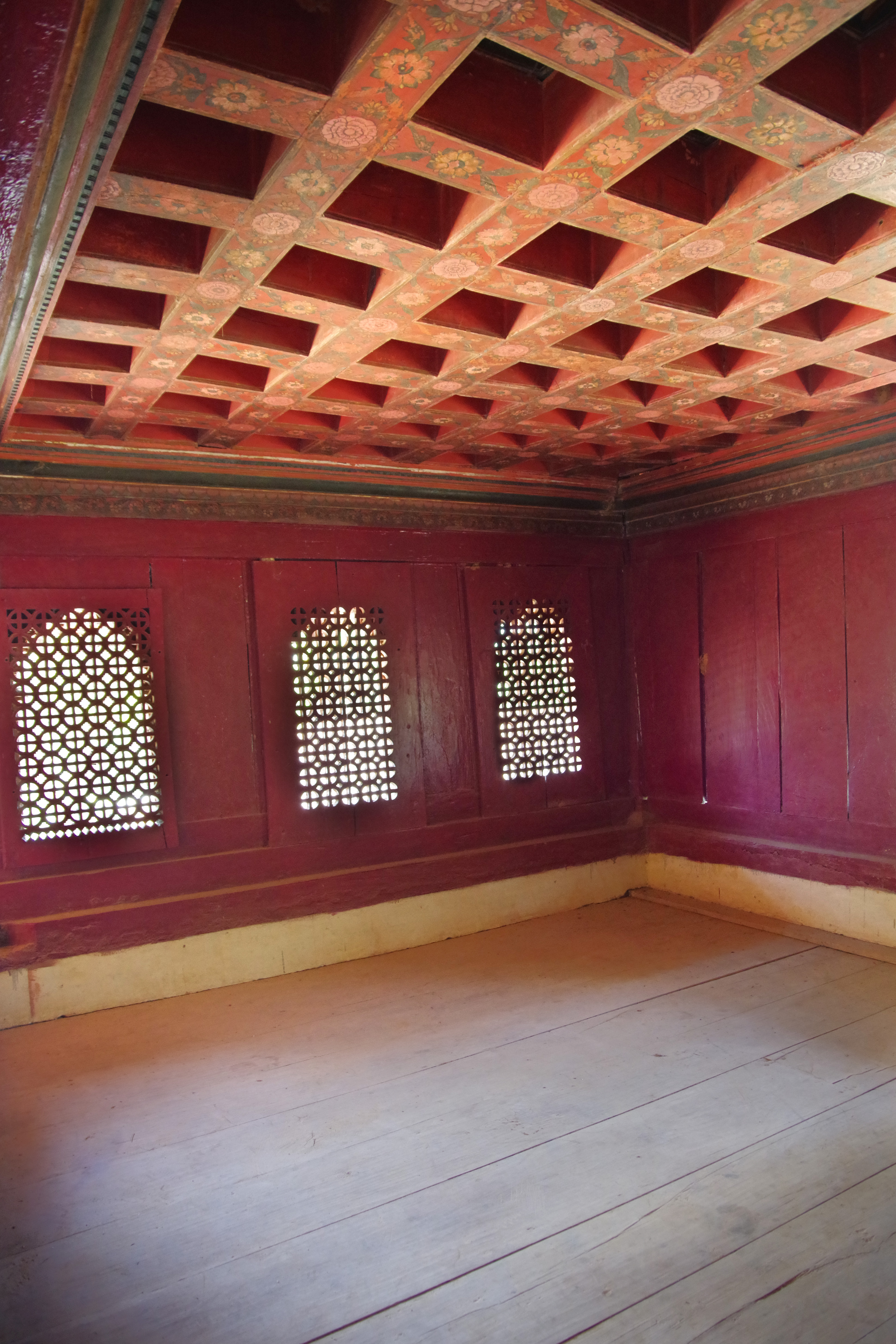
Room on the first floor

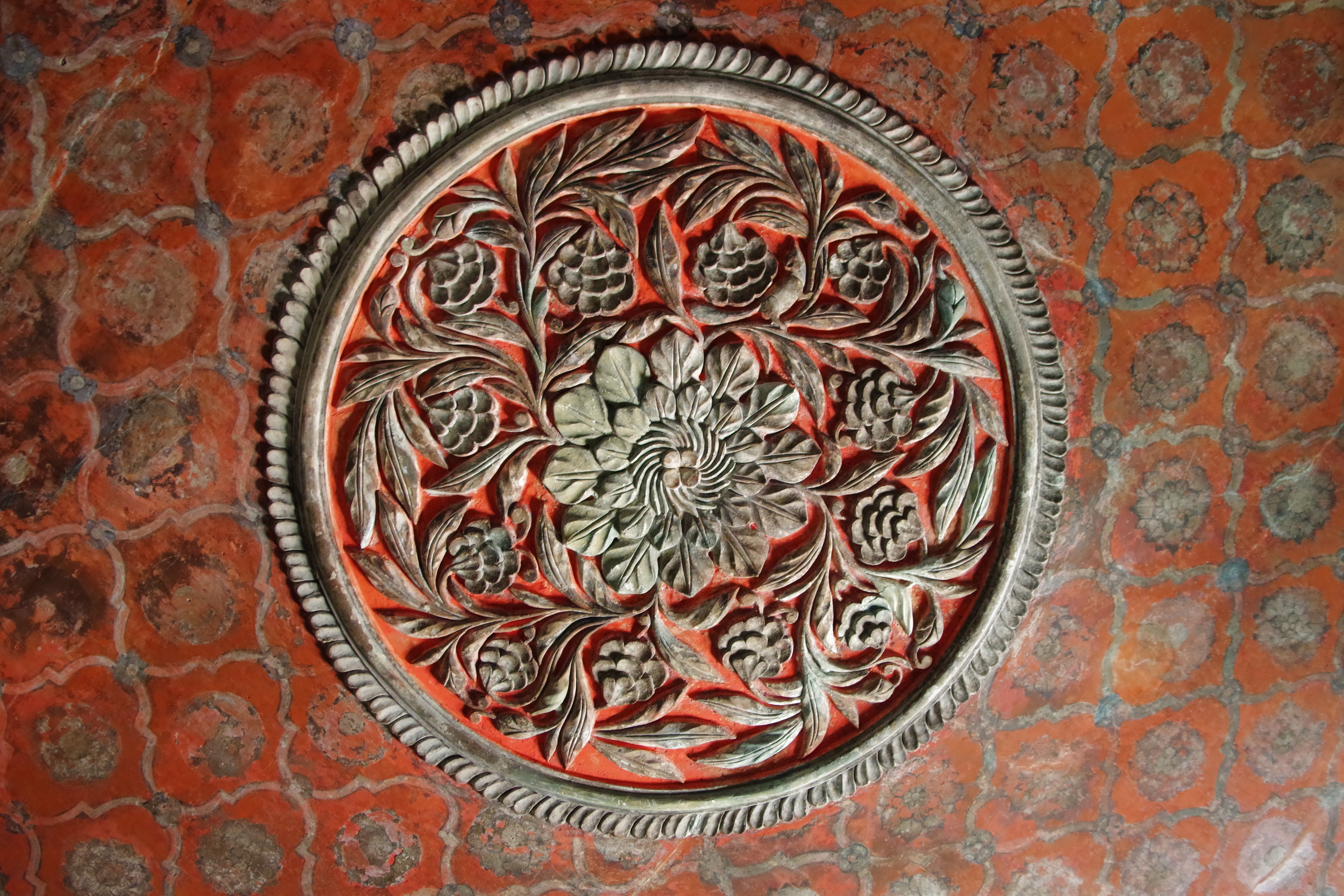
Ceiling

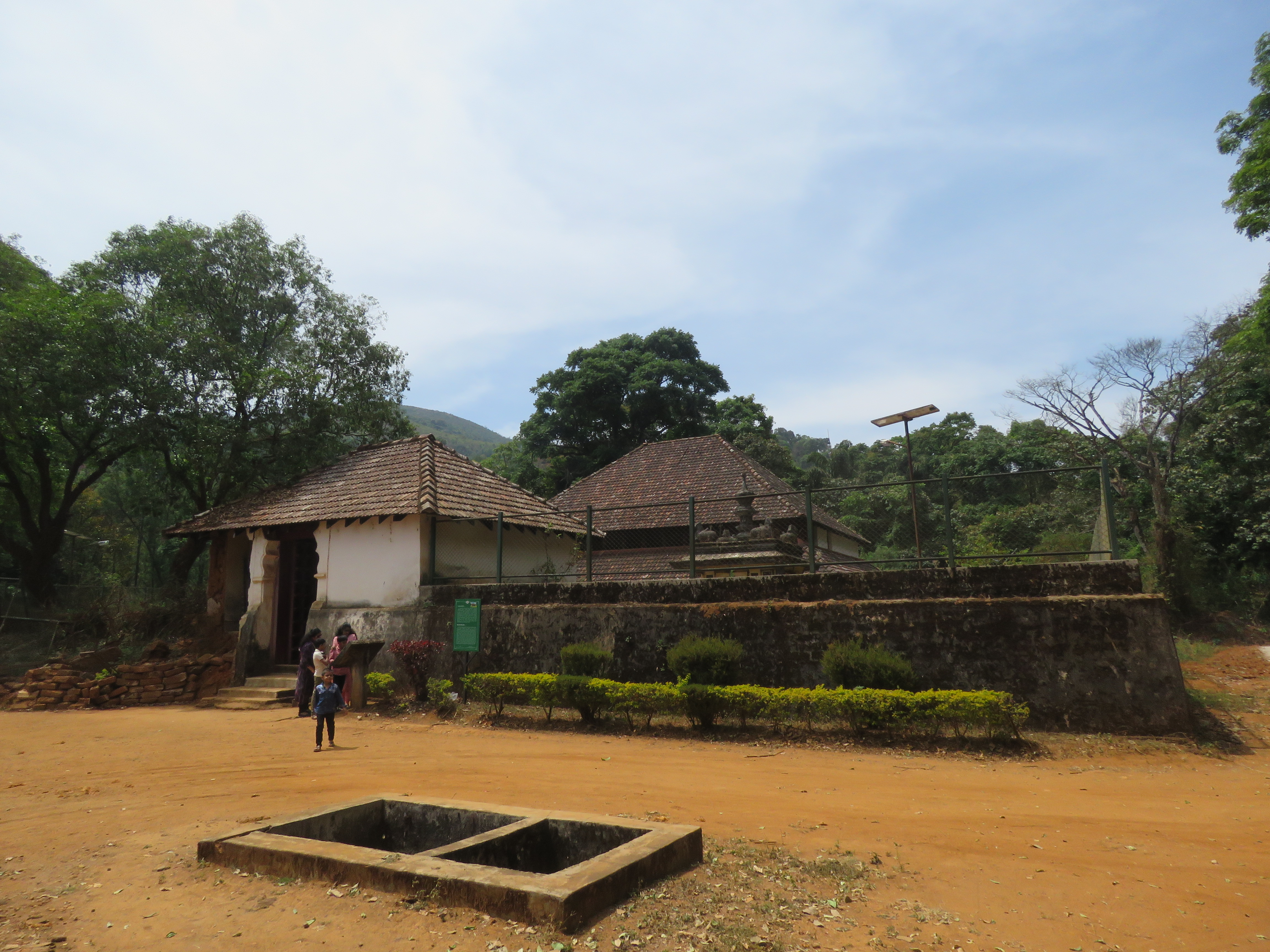
Palace as seen from outsite the Gate

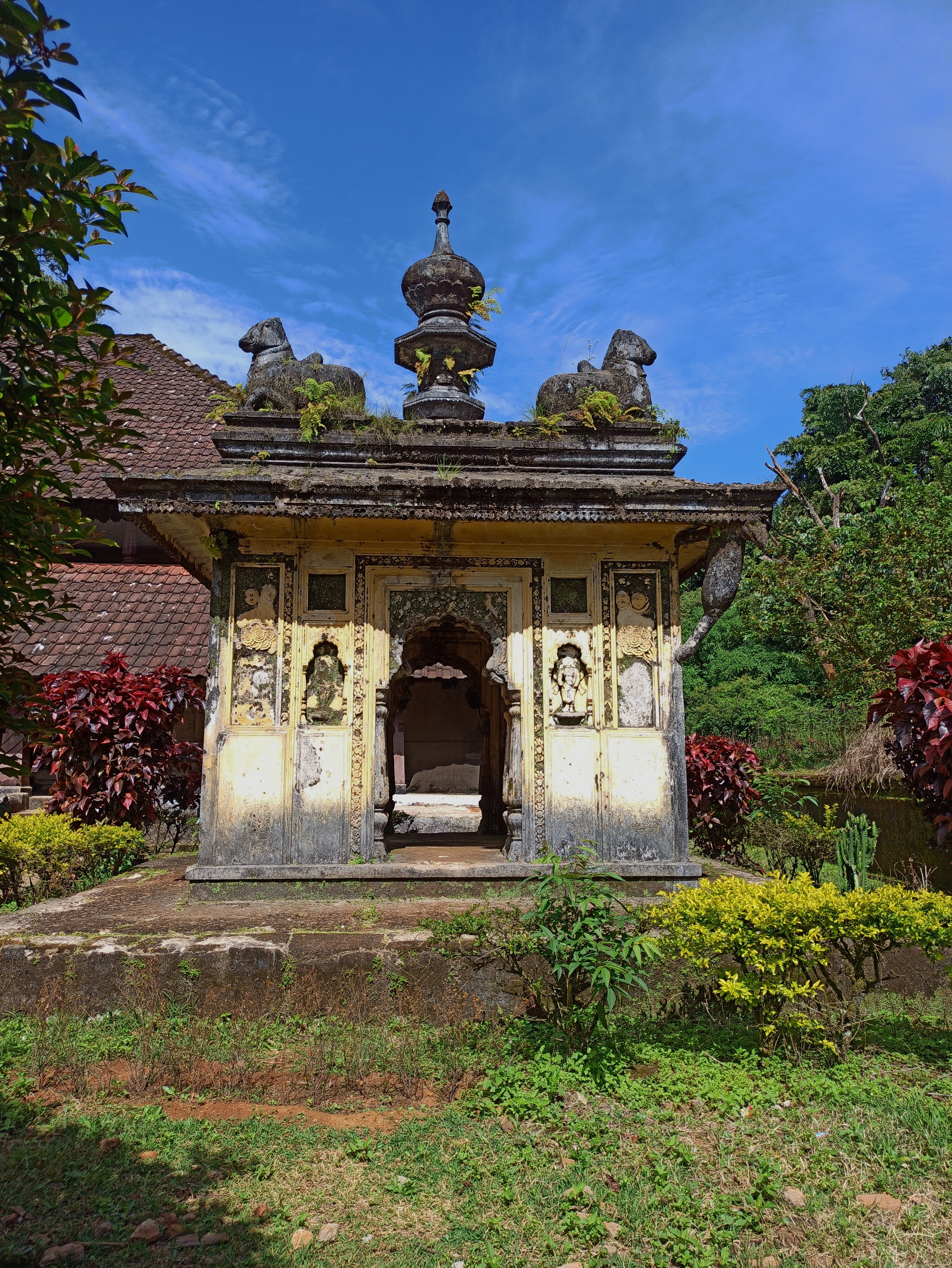
Kalyana Mantapa

== See also ==
- Ainmanes
