= Kakanakote =

Forest in Karnataka, India

Coordinates: 11°53′55″N 76°12′10″E

Kakanakote is situated at a distance of 73 km from Mysore in Karnataka state, India. Its latitude is 11° 53' 32.99" N and longitude is 76° 12' 6.00" E. It is a thick forest of the Western Ghats, and a famous place where a large number of wild elephants can be found. Now it is a wildlife national park, the Nagarhole Tiger Reserve, monitored and regulated by the state.

== Origin of Name ==
This is the famous forest range named after the legendary Kaka Nayaka, who was the leader of the local forest dwelling Kuruba people. Impressed by Kaka Nayaka's bravery and with the then maharaja of Mysore named the forest after him.

== Facilities ==
Periodically herds of elephants were once captured at this place by the Khedda method. Facilities for wild life viewing are available in this national park. Now it is famous for the black leopard sighting near Kabini.

== Play ==
It is also made famous by the play of the same name by Maasti Venkatesh Ayengar. Based on play, Kannada theatrical film Kakana Kote directed by C. R. Simha released in 1977. In 2012, KV Subbana Aptha, Samuha and Kannada Vartha Ilake presented a screening of the film Kakana Kote, which is about the life of the tribals in Kakanakote.
