= Kaka Nayaka =

Figure in Indian legend

Kaka Nayaka was the legendary leader of the forest dwelling Jenu Kuruba people, after whom the present-day Kakanakote forest is named.

Kaka Nayaka's life has been dramatised as a play by Masti Venkatesha Iyengar and also made into a movie, titled Kakana Kote.
