= Subbana =

Subbanna
- Author: Masti Venkatesha Iyengar
- Language: Kannada
- Genre: Fiction
- Published: 1926
- Publication place: India
- Media type: Print (Paperback)
- Pages: 108

Subbanna is a story written by Masti Venkatesh Iyengar. This is a bildungsroman about an Indian violinist. This book has got translated to Hindi, Tamil, English and other languages. Subbanna's father is highly respected scholar in royal court of Mysuru and he hopes his son also follow his footsteps. However, Subbanna likes music and the story goes through the conflict Subbanna faces thought his life.
