= Victoria Gouramma =

Indian princess (1841–1864)

Princess Victoria Gouramma
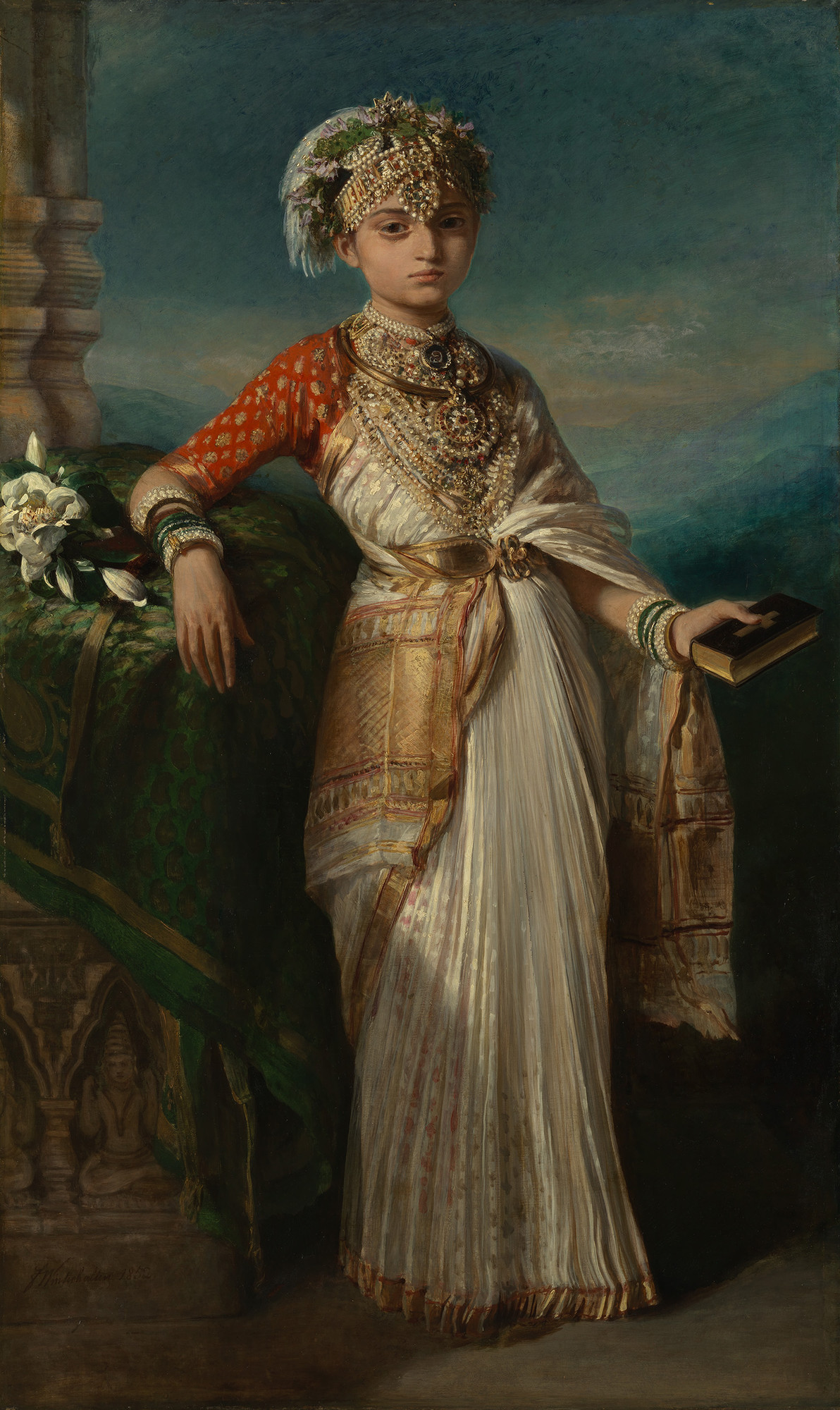
- Princess Victoria Gouramma Portrait,(1854), by Franz Xaver Winterhalter
- Born: Gowramma Virarajendra; 4 July 1841; Benares State, India, Native Kodagu, South India
- Died: 30 March 1864 (aged 22); London, United Kingdom
- Burial: Brompton Cemetery
- Spouse: Lt.Col.John Campbell (1860–1864)
- Issue: Edith Victoria Gouramma Campbell
- House: Haleri dynasty
- Father: Chikka Virarajendra
- Religion: Hinduism (1841–1852); Christianity (1852- Death)

Princess Victoria Gouramma ,(4 July 1841 – 30 March 1864), was an Indian Princess from the erstwhile Kingdom of Kodagu in India. She was the daughter of the last ruler Vira Rajendra of the Kodagu kingdom in South India.

== Early life ==
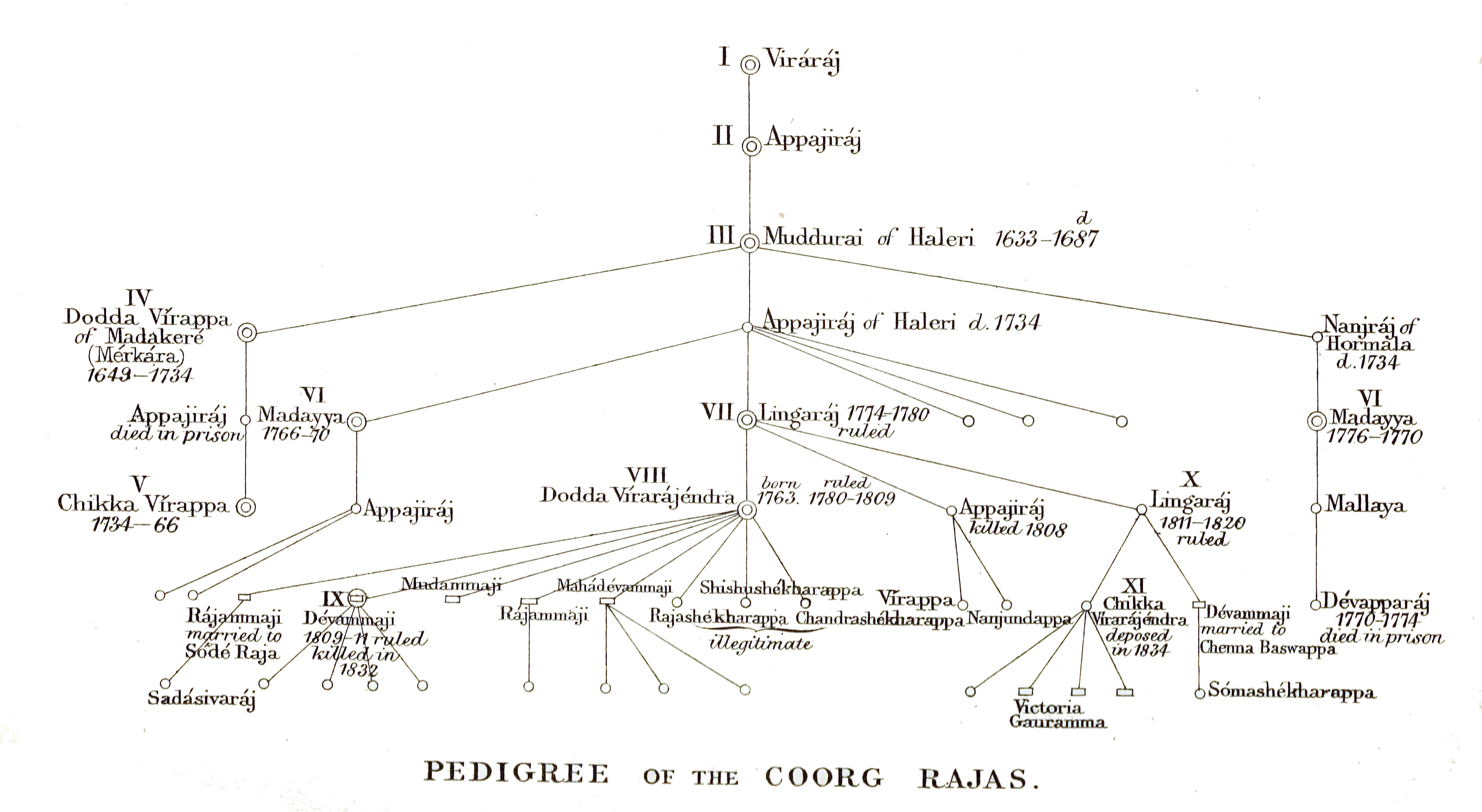
Family tree of Princess Gouramma.

She was born in city of Benares, in northern India. to Chikka Virarajendra (spelt "Veer Rajunder Wadeer" in English court proceedings), the ruler of Coorg who was deposed by the British in the Coorg War under the command of James Stuart Fraser. King Virarajendra surrendered on 24 April 1834, and was taken to Benares as a political prisoner. He went to England in March 1852 to demand in court that the British East India Company return his wealth. Queen Victoria received the deposed king, and his daughter was taken away from him. Princess Gowramma was then placed under the care of Major Drummond and his wife, who had travelled by ship along with the Raja. Princess Gowramma was baptised into the Church of England on 5 July 1852 in a ceremony at Buckingham Palace, by John Bird Sumner, Archbishop of Canterbury. The Queen stood as godmother (sponsor), giving her the name “Victoria”. In 1865, the Queen commissioned German painter Franz Xaver Winterhalter to paint a portrait of Gouramma for the Princesses’ (now Principal) corridor at Buckingham Palace. In 1858, Queen Victoria asked Lena, Lady Login to find a suitor for her goddaughter. Ever since the princess was too young to be married there was an expectation that she would be a suitable wife for Duleep Singh, another deposed member of royalty, but he announced he intended to marry an Englishwoman.

== Personal life ==
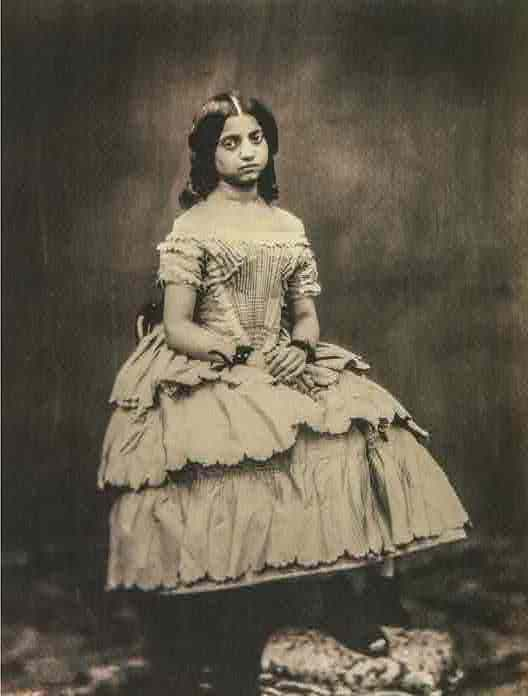
Princess Victoria Gouramma by Roger Fenton

Lady Login tried to find a suitable European nobleman to become Gowramma's husband, but later Princess Gowramma was married to Lt. Col. John Campbell in July 1860, who was 30 years her senior, despite the serious age gap. They had a daughter, Edith Victoria Gouramma Campbell born on 2 July 1861. Edith Victoria married Henry Edward Yardley, son of Sir W. Yardley, and together had a son named Henry Victor Rajendra Yardley. Later her son immigrated to Australia and died in the year 1936. Her grandson Henry Victor Rajendra’s descendants there include a great-granddaughter, Natashya, who has since visited their ancestral seat.

== Death ==
Princess Gouramma died of tuberculosis in 1864 and was buried at Brompton Cemetery. A marble bust of her by Baron Marochetti is now at the Osborne House on the Isle of Wight.

== Other sources ==
- Belliappa, C.P. (2009) Victoria Gowramma: The Lost Princess of Coorg. Rupa Publications.
