= History of Kodagu =

Kodagu: home of the Kodavas shown above in the map of Karnataka, India (in orange)

The district of Kodagu in present-day Karnataka comprises the area of the former princely state of the same name.

== Early history ==
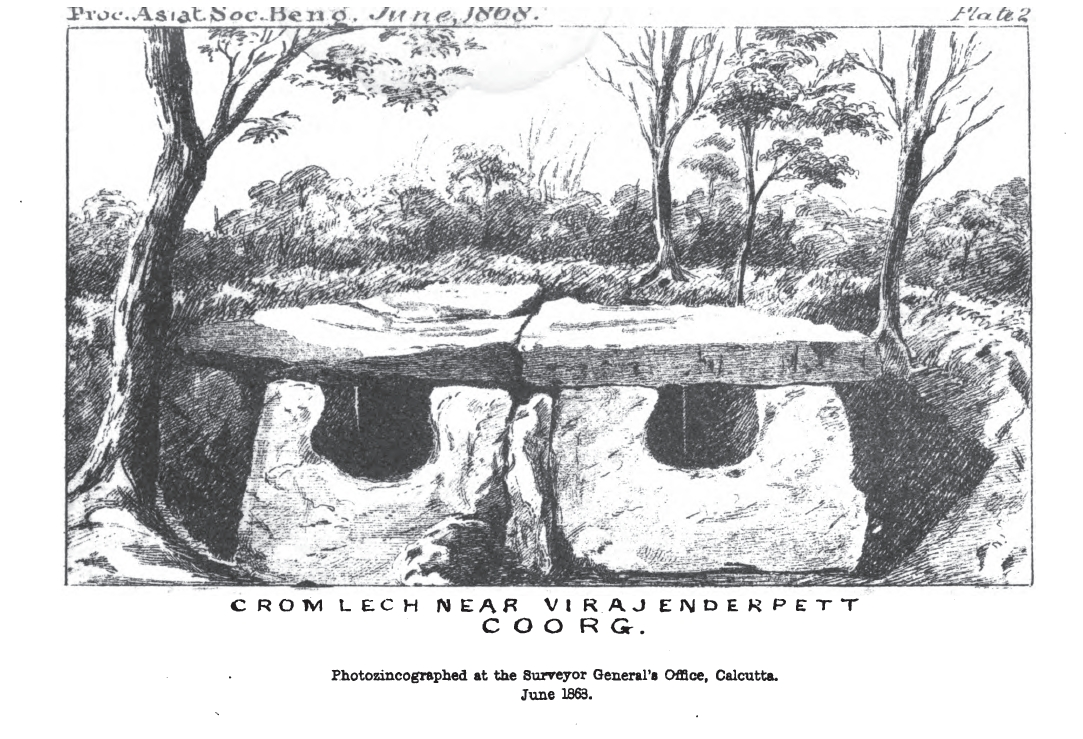
A Megalithic burial or "cromlech" near Virarajendrepet, Joshika in 1868

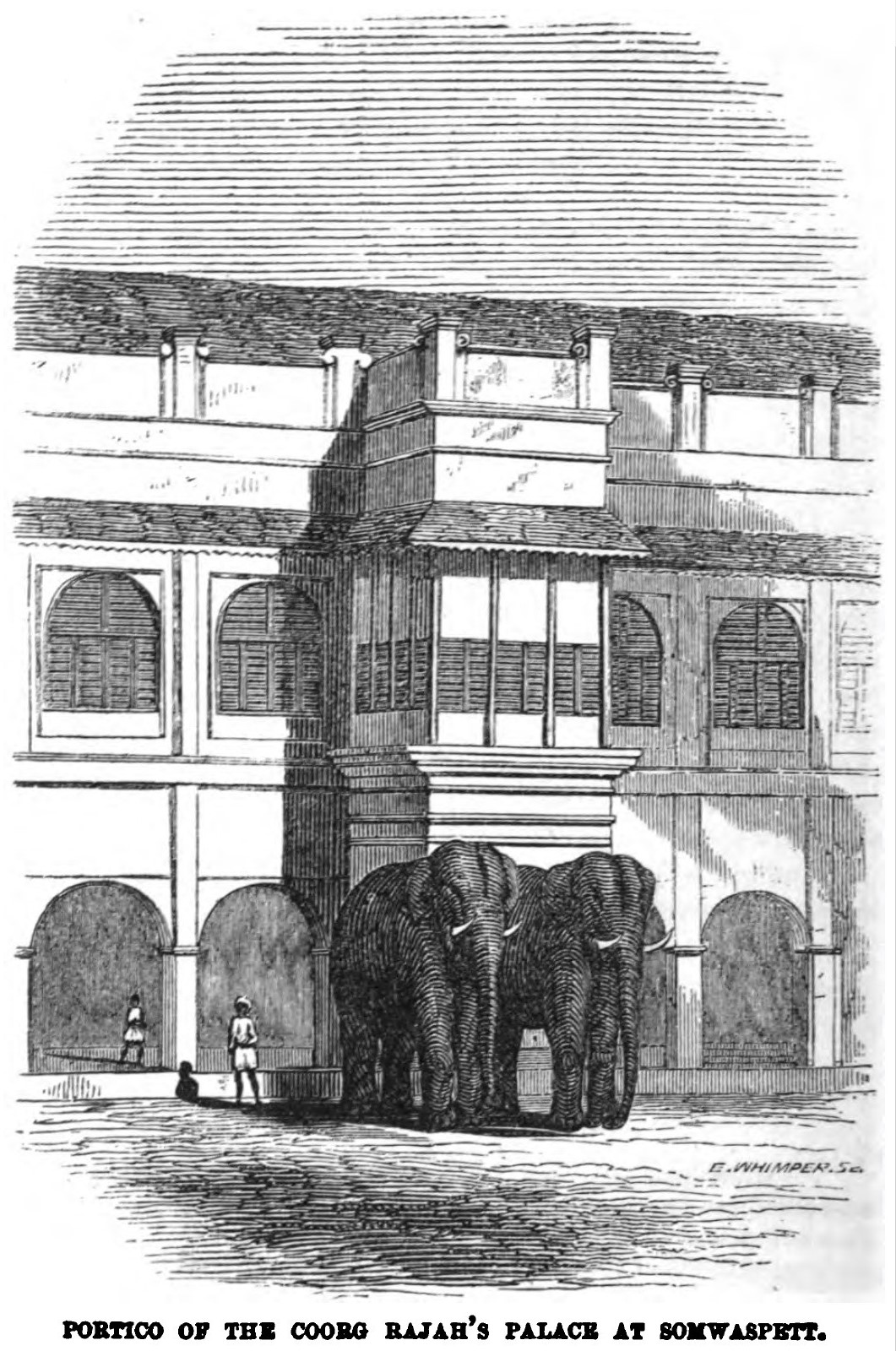
Portico of the Coorg Rajah's Palace at Somwaspett (May 1853, X, p.48)

The earliest mention about Coorg can be seen in the works those date back to Sangam period (300 BCE – 300 CE). The Ezhimala dynasty had jurisdiction over two Nadus – The coastal Poozhinadu and the hilly eastern Karkanadu. According to the works of Sangam literature, Poozhinadu consisted much of the coastal belt between Mangalore and Kozhikode. Karkanadu consisted of Wayanad-Gudalur hilly region with parts of Kodagu (Coorg). Kannada inscriptions speak of Kudagu nad (parts of Kodagu, Western Mysore and Kerala) as well. Both the name of the natives and of the region are synonymous (Kodava-Kodavu; Kodaga-Kodagu; Coorgs-Coorg).

== The Haleri dynasty ==
=== Early Haleri ===
The Haleri dynasty was an offshoot of Keladi Nayakas also called Ikkeri Arasu dynasty. Kodagu was independent of Mysore, which was hard pressed by enemies, and a prince of the Ikkeri or Bednur family (perhaps related to the Changalvas) succeeded in bringing the whole country under his sway, his descendants continuing to be Rajas of Kodagu till 1834. The capital was removed in 1681 by Muddu Raja to Madikeri (Mercara).

=== Mysore Sultan ===
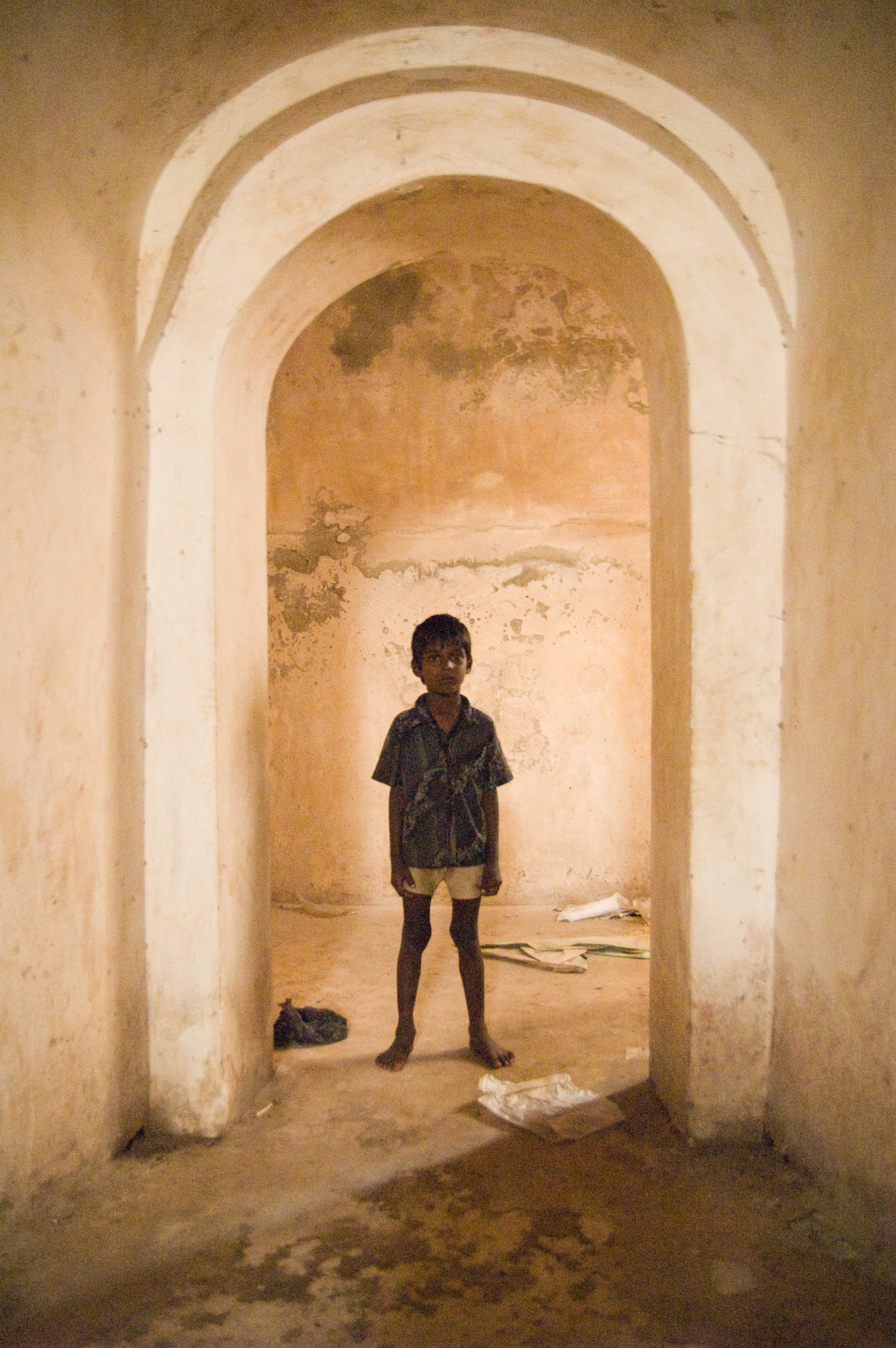
A dungeon at Seringapatam. Prisoners of war were imprisoned into such dungeons.

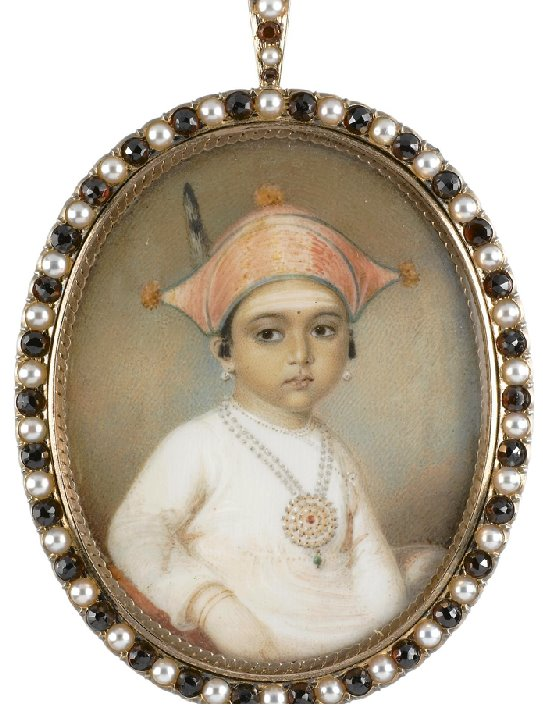
A daughter of Dodda Vira Rajendra

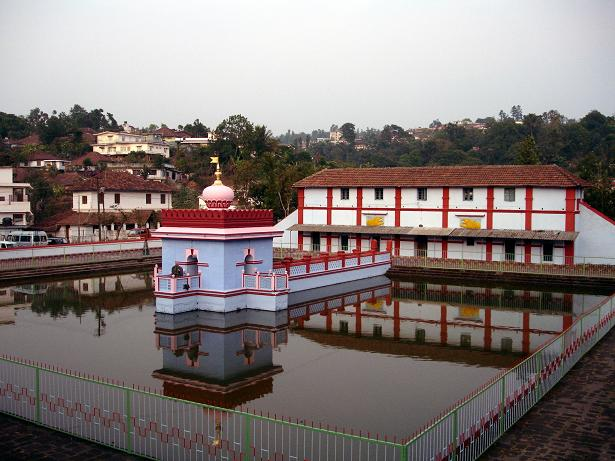
Omkareshwara Temple built by Linga Raja in Madikeri

In the late 1760s, Hyder Ali tried to invade Kodagu thrice and was defeated by the then general of Kodagu Kannanda Doddayya. In 1770 a disputed succession led to the intervention of Hyder Ali of Mysore in favour of Linga Raja, who had fled to him for justice, and whom he placed on the throne benevolently. As a gesture of his gratitude, the Raja ceded certain territories and offered to pay tribute. On Linga Rajas death in 1780 Hyder Ali interned his sons, who were minors, in a fort in Mysore, and installed a governor as their guardian at Mercara with a Mysore garrison. In 1782, however, the Kodava rose in rebellion and drove out the Mysore troops.

Tipu Sultan first negotiated with the Coorgs, worked an amicable settlement and made them feel secure. But then a surprise attack was launched upon the Kodavas following which 500 were killed and over 40,000 Kodavas fled to the woods and concealed themselves in the mountains. The Coorgs were defeated and a large number of them (including women and children) were taken captive. The territories seized were held down by garrisons in four forts. The captured Coorgis were subjected to forcible conversions to Islam. The prisoners were converted into Muslim Ahmadees. The young men were all forcibly circumcised and incorporated into the Ahmadee Corps. They were trained and made to form 8 Assad Ilahi (Asadulai) and Ahmadi Risalas (or regiments).

In 1788, however, Dodda Vira Raja (or Vira Rajendra Wodeyar), with his wife and his brothers Linga Raja and Appaji, succeeded in escaping from his captivity, at Periapatam and, placing himself at the head of a Kodava rebellion, aligned with the British and succeeded in driving the forces of Tipu (who had aligned with the French) out of the country. On the spot where he had first met the British commander, General Abercromby, the Kodagu Raja founded the city of Virarajendrapet (this is now usually called Virajpet).

=== Later Haleri ===
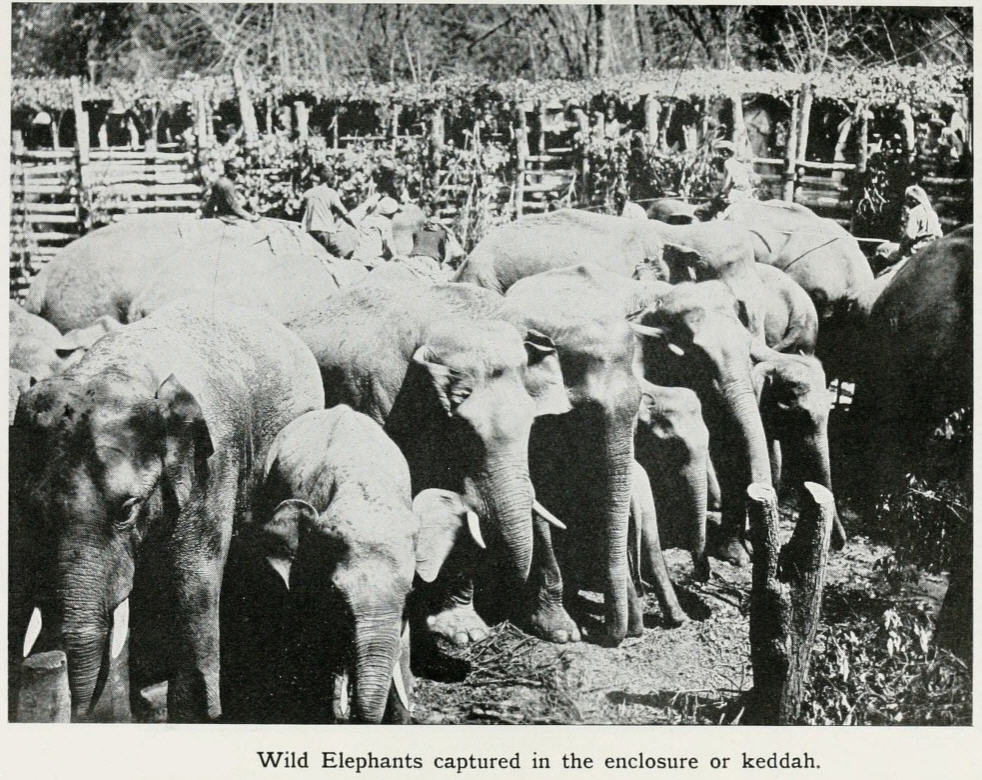

Dodda Vira Raja, who, in consequence of his mind becoming unhinged, was guilty towards the end of his reign of hideous atrocities, died in 1809 without male heirs, leaving his favourite daughter Devammji as Rani. His brother Linga Raja, however, after acting as regent for his niece, announced in 1811, his own assumption of the government. He died in 1820 and was succeeded by his son Chikka Veera Raja, a youth of twenty. He had members of the families of his predecessors, including Devammaji put to death.The last few Rajas and their family members married members of the Mukkatira and Palanganda Kodava families. At last, in 1833, overnight production of evidence of treasonable designs on the Raja's part led to inquiries on the spot by the British resident at Mysore, as the result of which, and of the Raja's refusal to amend his ways, a British force marched into Kodagu in 1834 after a medium-sized war, when the Raja surrendered. It was a short but bloody campaign that occurred in which a number of British men and officers were killed. Near Somwarpet, where the Coorgs were led by Mathanda Appachu the resistance had been most furious, by the Kodava warriors. But this Coorg campaign came to a quick end when the Rajah had to surrender to the British.

== British rule ==
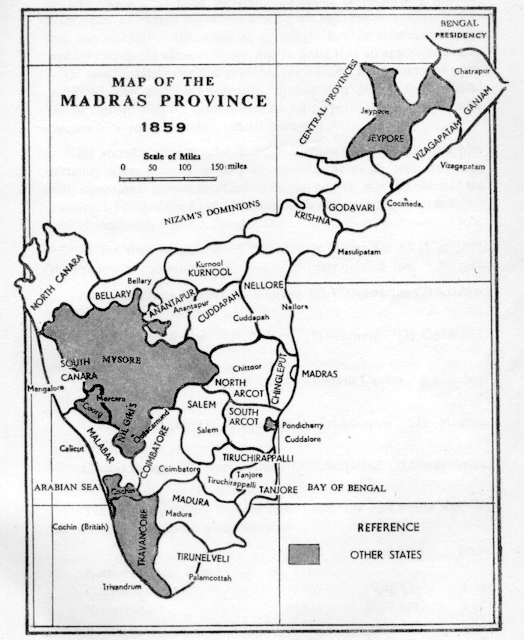
Coorg in 1859

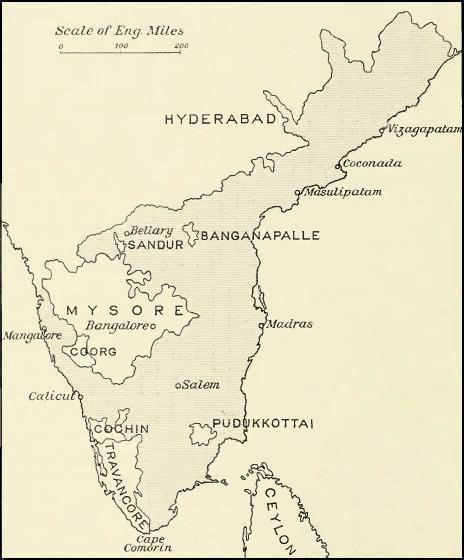
Coorg province in British India in 1913

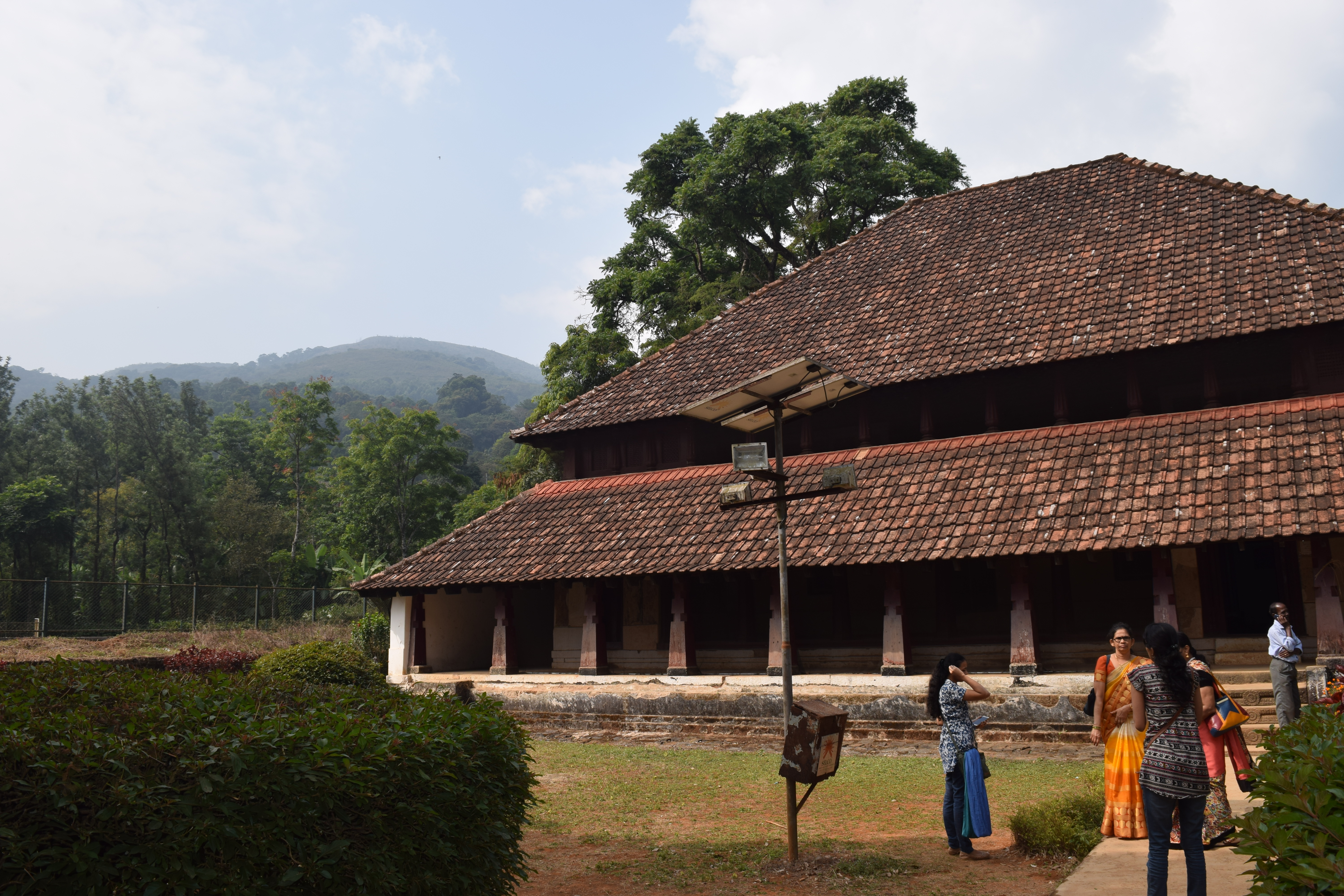
Nalknad Palace

On 11 April 1834, the raja was deposed by Colonel Fraser, the political agent with the force, and on 7 May the state was formally annexed to the East India Company's territory, as Coorg. In 1852 the Raja, who had been deported to Vellore, obtained leave to visit England with his favourite daughter Gauramma, to whom he wished to give a European education. On 30 June she was baptised, Queen Victoria being one of her godmothers; she afterwards married a British officer who, after her death in 1864, mysteriously disappeared together with their child. Vira Raja himself died in 1863 and was buried in Kensal Green Cemetery.

The Amara Sulya Movement of 1837 began when the British bifurcated Amara Sulya from Kodagu Samsthaana and demanded agricultural tax to be paid in the form of money by Sulya residents. The British had also deposed the Raja. The freedom movement to reinstate tradition over English Hegemony was led Sri Kedambadi Ramè Gowda, Coorgs, Koojugodu Mallayya Gowda and Chetty Kudiya among others.
After the rebellion the British presented Coorg chiefs who had remained loyal with gifts including horses, while a special Coorg Medal was awarded to chiefs, local leaders and those Kodavas who had supported the British during the conflict.

Coorg (Kodagu) was the smallest province in India, with an area of only 1,582 square miles (4,100 km^{2}). As a province of British India, it was administered by a commissioner, subordinate to the Governor-General of India through the resident of Mysore, who was also officially chief commissioner of Coorg. Later freedom fighters from Kodagu supported the National Independence Movement. One of them, Pandyanda Belliappa was known as Kodagu's Gandhi.

== Independent India ==
Map of South Indian states prior to the States Reorganisation Act,1956. Kodagu (then called Coorg) is in dark green.

After India's independence in 1947, Coorg became a province, and in 1950 a state by name of Coorg State of Republic of India. In 1952 elections to the Coorg Legislative Assembly were held. In 1956, when India's state boundaries were reorganized along linguistic lines, it became a district of the then Mysore state.

The Chief commissioners of Coorg were;

1947 – 1949 Dewan Bahadur Ketolira Chengappa
1949 – 1950 C.T. Mudaliar
1950 – 1956 Kanwar Daya Singh Bedi

The Chief minister 1952-1956 was C.M. Poonacha.

Mysore state later became the modern state of Karnataka, and the formal name of the district returned to the original, Kodagu.

Many Coorgs joined the Indian army, the Indian hockey team and other sports. Prominent among them were Field Marshal K. M.Cariappa, General K.S.Thimayya, Lt. Gen. Iyappa (BEL chairman Aiyappa), Sqdn Leader Ajjamada B. Devaiah (war martyr), hockey captain M P Ganesh, tennis player Rohan Bopanna, CAG C. G. Somiah, etc., Kodagu district#Notable people

Historical overview of the Kodava people

== See also ==
- Haleri Kingdom
- Kodagu
- Kodava
