= Linga Rajendra II =

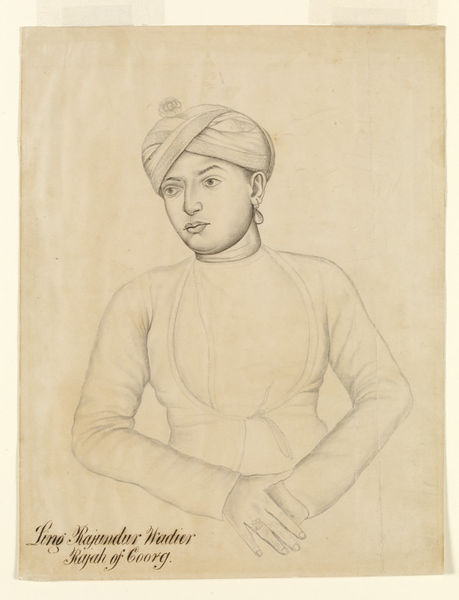
Linga Rajendra II

Linga Rajendra II or Linga Raja II was the ruler of Kodagu Kingdom (r.1811–1820). He renovated Madikeri Fort's Palace between 1812 and 1814.

He was succeeded by his son Chikka Vira Rajendra in 1820.
