= Coorg War =

Conflict between the British East India Company and the State of Coorg in 1834

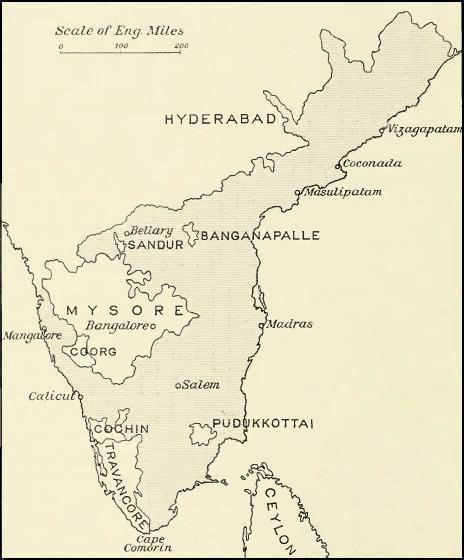
Coorg during the British Raj

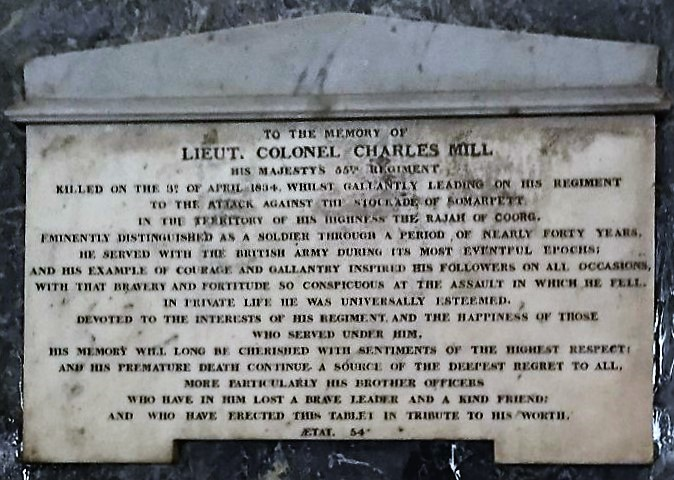
Memorial of Lieut. Col. Charles Mill, Coorg War, 1834, St. Mary's Church, Madras

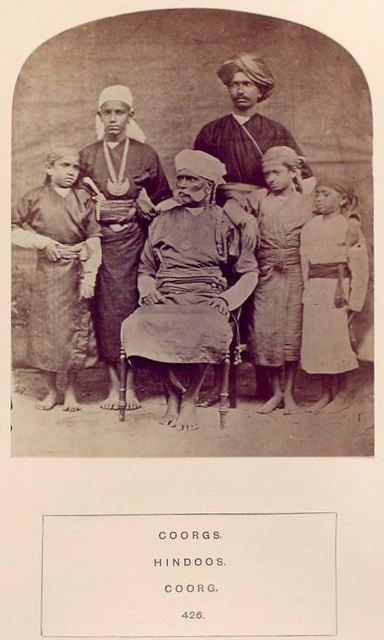
Kodava clansmen at home, 1875, by J. Forbes Watson (from NY public library)

The Coorg War was fought between the British East India Company and the Kingdom of Coorg in 1834. Defiance of the Raja of Coorg (Chikka Virarajendra), a small state in South India, led to a short but bloody campaign in 1834. In February 1834, a force of 7,000 was assembled under the command of Brigadier General Lindsay to commence operations against the Raja, who had begun hostilities against the British. Due to the poor state of roads, the force was divided into four columns, which were to enter Coorg from different directions and converge on the capital of Mercara. On 11 March, the Northern Division under the command of Colonel Gilbert Waugh entered the territory of Coorg and on 3 April, the leading troops made contact with the enemy. At noon, the advanced guard arrived in front of the fortified position of Soamwar Pettah (now called Somwarpet). The force launched an attack on the position but was forced to retreat after a severe mauling. The leader of the Coorg resistance was 'Madanta' (Mathanda) Appachu. A similar fate was suffered by another column.

On 4th April, Diwan Lakshminarayana and Mahomed Taker Khan, a friend of the Raja, carried a peace flag to the British camp. Kulputty Karnikara Manoon who had been held prisoner by the Raja was handed over to the British. The Raja's surrender was demanded. Instead, on 5th April, Diwan Bopu surrendered to Col Fraser the British agent. Fraser was led to the Madikeri fort on 6th April. On 10th April, the Raja who was in Nalknad palace entered Madikeri fort with his wives and surrendered to the British.

Some of the British officers who served in the Coorg campaign against the Coorgs and survived were Robert Cannon, Colin Mackenzie and William Anson McCleverty. The British losses during the campaign were 93 killed and 200 wounded.

== See also ==
- Coorgs (Kodavas)
- History of Coorg (Kodagu)
