= Kingdom of Coorg =

Independent kingdom in India (16th century-1834)

Kingdom of Coorg Kodagu
- 16th century C.E.–1834
- Kingdom of Coorg
- Status: Independent Kingdom (1500s-1780); Subordinate to Kingdom of Mysore (1780-1788); Princely state under the suzerainty of the British Crown (1790-1834)
- Capital: Madikeri
- Common languages: Kodava, Kannada, Arebhashe
- Religion: Hinduism
- Government: Monarchy
- Maharaja
- History
  - Established: 16th century C.E.
  - Disestablished: 1834
Preceded by	Succeeded by
Vijayanagara Empire	Coorg Province

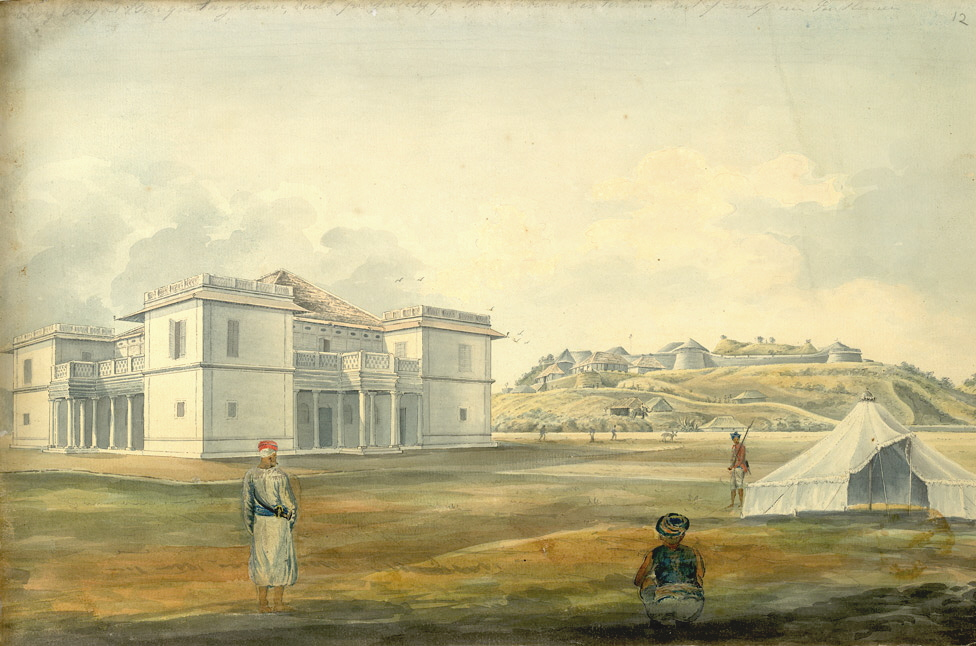
Watercolour of the guest house of the Raja of Coorg with the fort in the background, 1795

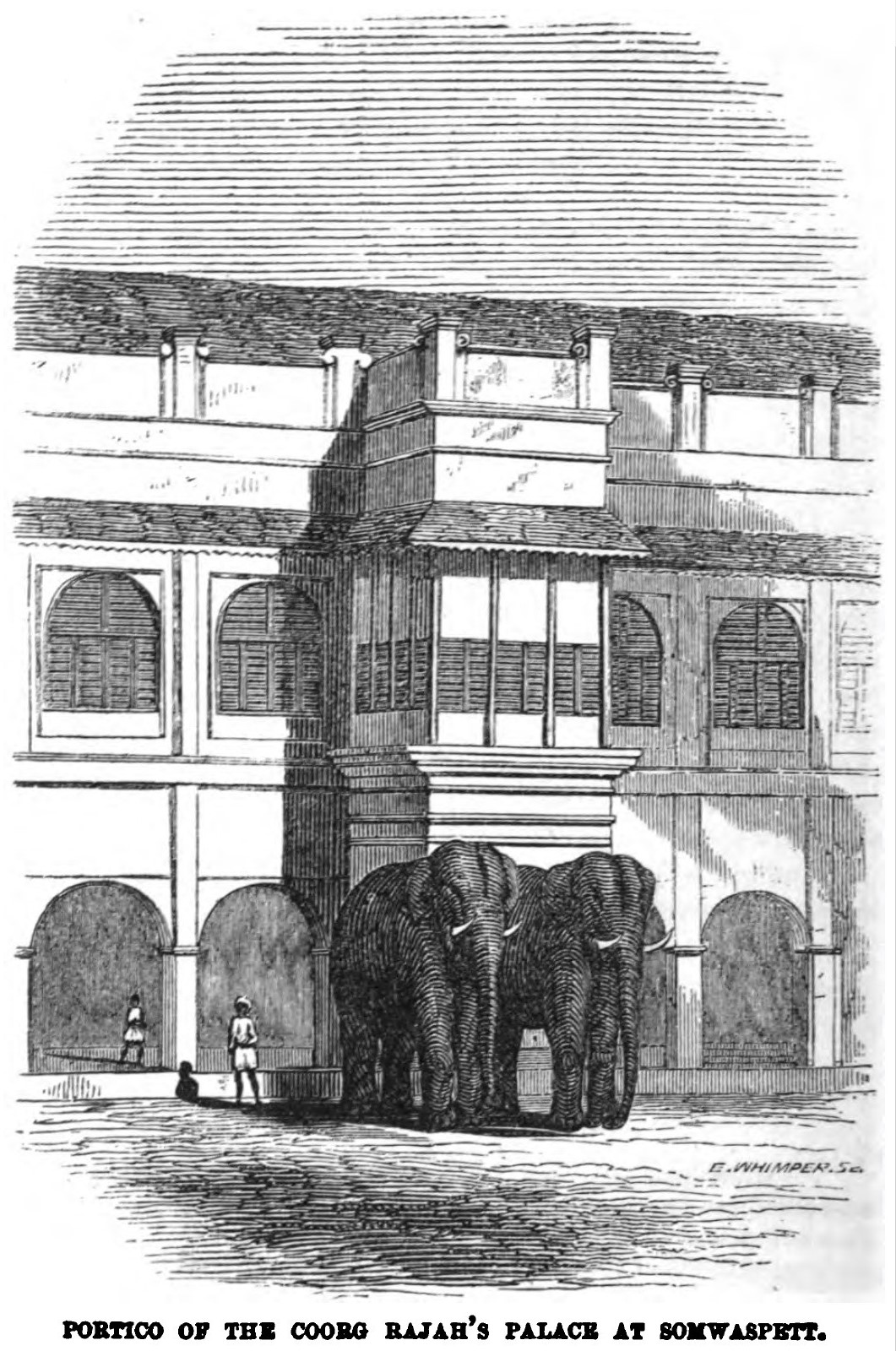
Portico of the Coorg Rajah's palace at Somwaspett (May 1853, X, p.48)

The Kingdom of Coorg (or Kingdom of Kodagu) was an independent kingdom that existed in India from the 16th century until 1834. It was ruled by a branch of the Ikkeri Nayaka. From 1780 to 1788, the kingdom was occupied by neighbouring Mysore but the Rajah of Coorg was restored by the British and became a protectorate of the British East India Company on 26 October 1790. In 1834, the then Raja of Coorg rebelled against British authority, sparking the Coorg War. The brief conflict resulted in the British annexing the kingdom in the same year, with the region then becoming Coorg Province, a province of British India.

== Early history ==
Although Rājendranāme, a royal genealogy of the rulers of Coorg written in 1808, makes no mention of the origin of the lineage, its reading by historian Lewis Rice led him to conclude that the princely line was established by a member of the Ikkeri Nayaka family, who first settled in Halerinard. Having moved south to the town of Haleri in northern Coorg in the disguise of a wandering Jangama monk (or, by some recounting, a Lingayat monk), he soon began to attract followers; with their help, or their acquiescence, he took possession of the town, and in such manner came to rule the entire country. According to the genealogy, the Coorg rajas who ruled from the early 17th century to the mid-19th century were:

Rulers of Coorg (Haleri Dynasty) and Historical Details
Ruler	Period of Rule	Details
Vira Rāja	c. 1580–1620	Founder of the Haleri dynasty; an Ikkeri prince who established control over local Coorg chieftains.
Appaji Rāja	c. 1620–1633	Son of Vira Raja; continued the consolidation of the Haleri clan's authority in Northern Coorg.
Muddu Rāja I	1633–1687	Notable for moving the capital from Haleri to Madikeri (Mercara) in 1681 and building the Madikeri Fort.
Dodda Virappa	1687–1736	Longest-reigning monarch; successfully defended Coorg against the Kingdom of Mysore and the Chikkadevaraja Wodeyar.
Chikka Virappa	1736–1766	His reign saw increasing pressure from Mysore, led by Hyder Ali, who began eyeing Coorg's strategic territory.
Muddu Rāja II	1766–1770	Ruled during a period of intense internal succession disputes and external threats from Mysore.
Devappa Rāja	1770–1774	Defeated by Hyder Ali's forces; he died in captivity, leading to the first period of Mysore occupation.
Linga Rāja I	1774–1780	Installed by Hyder Ali as a puppet ruler; his death triggered the captivity of the royal family in Periyapatna.
Dodda Vira Rajendra	1780–1809	Escaped Mysore captivity in 1788; liberated Coorg from Tipu Sultan and became a key British ally.
Devammaji (Rani)	1809–1811	Daughter of Dodda Vira Rajendra; her brief reign was cut short by her uncle's successful bid for the throne.
Linga Rāja II	1811–1820	Known for his administrative reforms and the construction of the Omkareshwara Temple in Madikeri.
Vira Rāja II	1820–1834	The last ruler of Coorg; deposed and exiled by the British after the Coorg War, leading to annexation.

Muddu Raja, the Coorg ruler from 1633 to 1687, initially ruled from the town of Haleri, but later moved his capital to Mercara, which he fortified and where he built a palace in 1681. Early during the rule of his successor, Dodda Virappa (1687–1736), the army of the neighbouring kingdom of Mysore, under the orders of Wodeyar Chikka Devaraja, attacked and seized Piriyapatna, a territory which abutted Coorg (see Map 11), and which was then being ruled by a kinsman of Dodda Virappa. Buoyed by the victory, the Mysore army soon attacked Coorg itself; however, it had advanced only a short distance, when, while camping overnight on the plain of Palupare, it was surprised by a Coorg ambush. In the ensuing massacre, the Mysore army lost 15,000 men, and the survivors had to beat a hasty retreat. For most of the next two decades, the western reaches of Mysore remained vulnerable to attacks by the Coorg army. In the border district of Yelusavira, the Coorg and Mysore forces fought to a stalemate and, in the end, had to work out a tax sharing arrangement.

In 1724, major hostilities resumed between Coorg and Mysore.Changing his modus operandi from guerrilla skirmishes in the hilly Coorg jungle to open field warfare, Dodda Virappa, attacked the Mysore army in the plains. Catching it off guard, he took in rapid succession six fortresses from Piriyapatna to Arkalgud. The resulting loss of revenue, some 600,000 gold pagodas, was felt in Mysore, and several months later, in August or September 1724, a large army was sent from Seringapatam, the Mysore capital, to Coorg. Upon the Mysore army's arrival in the western region, however, the Coorg forces, returning to guerrilla warfare, retreated into the woods. Emboldened by the lack of resistance, the Mysore forces next mounted an attack on the Coorg hills. There too, they met no resistance. However, a few days into this invasion, the Mysore forces, recalling their ignominious ambush in the 1890s, panicked and retreated during the night. Soon, the Coorg army was attacking the Mysore outposts again. This pattern of back and forth was to continue until the Mysore army was recalled, a few months later, to Seringapatam, leaving the region again vulnerable to the periodic raids of the Coorg army. According to historian Sanjay Subrahmanyam,

The entire episode yields a rare insight into one aspect of war in the 18th century: the (Coorg) forces, lacking cavalry, with a minimum of firearms, lost every major battle, but won the war by dint of two factors. First, the terrain, and the possibility of retreating periodically into the wooded hillside, favoured them, in contrast to their relatively clumsy opponents. Second, the Mysore army could never maintain a permanent presence in the region, given the fact that the Wodeyar kingdom had several open frontiers.

The ruler was succeeded by his grandson, Chikka Virappa, whose unremarkable rule lasted until 1768, when Coorg was conquered by Haidar Ali, the new sultan of Mysore.

== Later history ==
In 1780, Coorg was invaded by Hyder Ali of Mysore and the state was annexed. For eight years, Coorg was a part of Mysore. In 1788, through British intervention, the Raja of Coorg regained his kingdom. He signed a treaty bringing Coorg under the protection of the British.

From 1790 to 1834, Coorg remained a protectorate of British India. In 1834, the then Raja of Coorg tried to shake off his allegiance to the British which resulted in the Coorg War. The state was eventually annexed and became the Coorg Province.

== British rule ==
Under British rule, the natives of Coorg were encouraged to join the Indian army. Even today most of the soldiers from Karnataka are from this land.

== Legacy ==
The present day Madikeri was formerly known as Muddu raja keri (meaning Mudduraja's town) and was named after the prominent king, Mudduraja who ruled Coorg from 1633-1687. The present day Virajpet derived from Virarajendrapete was the town established by Haleri king Dodda Veerarajendra, after whose name the city derives its name.

Chikka Virarajendra was the last ruler of Coorg. Kannada litterateur and Jnanpith Award recipient, Masti Venkatesha Iyengar, wrote a critically acclaimed book, Chikavira Rajendra, based on the life and times of that ruler. King Dodda Veerarajendra built the Nalknad Palace.

== Gallery ==
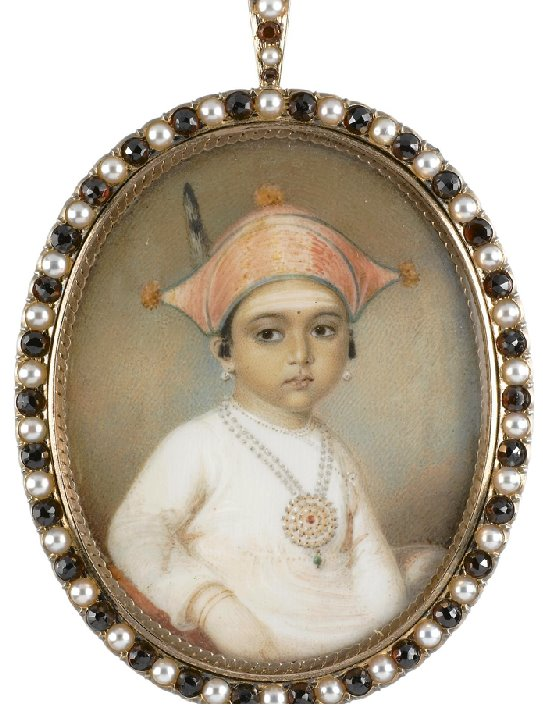
A daughter of Dodda Vira Rajendra

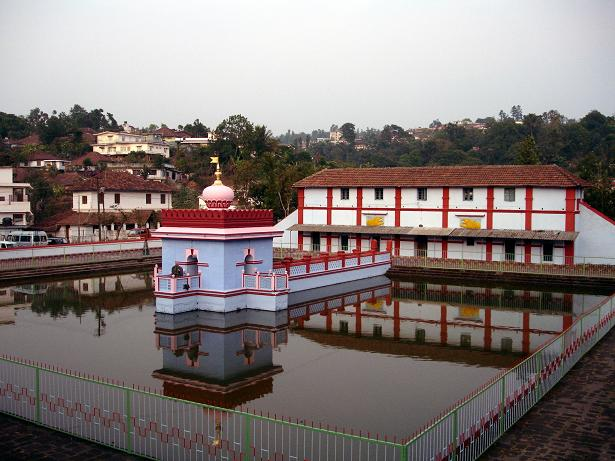
Omkareshwara Temple built by King Linga Raja in Madikeri

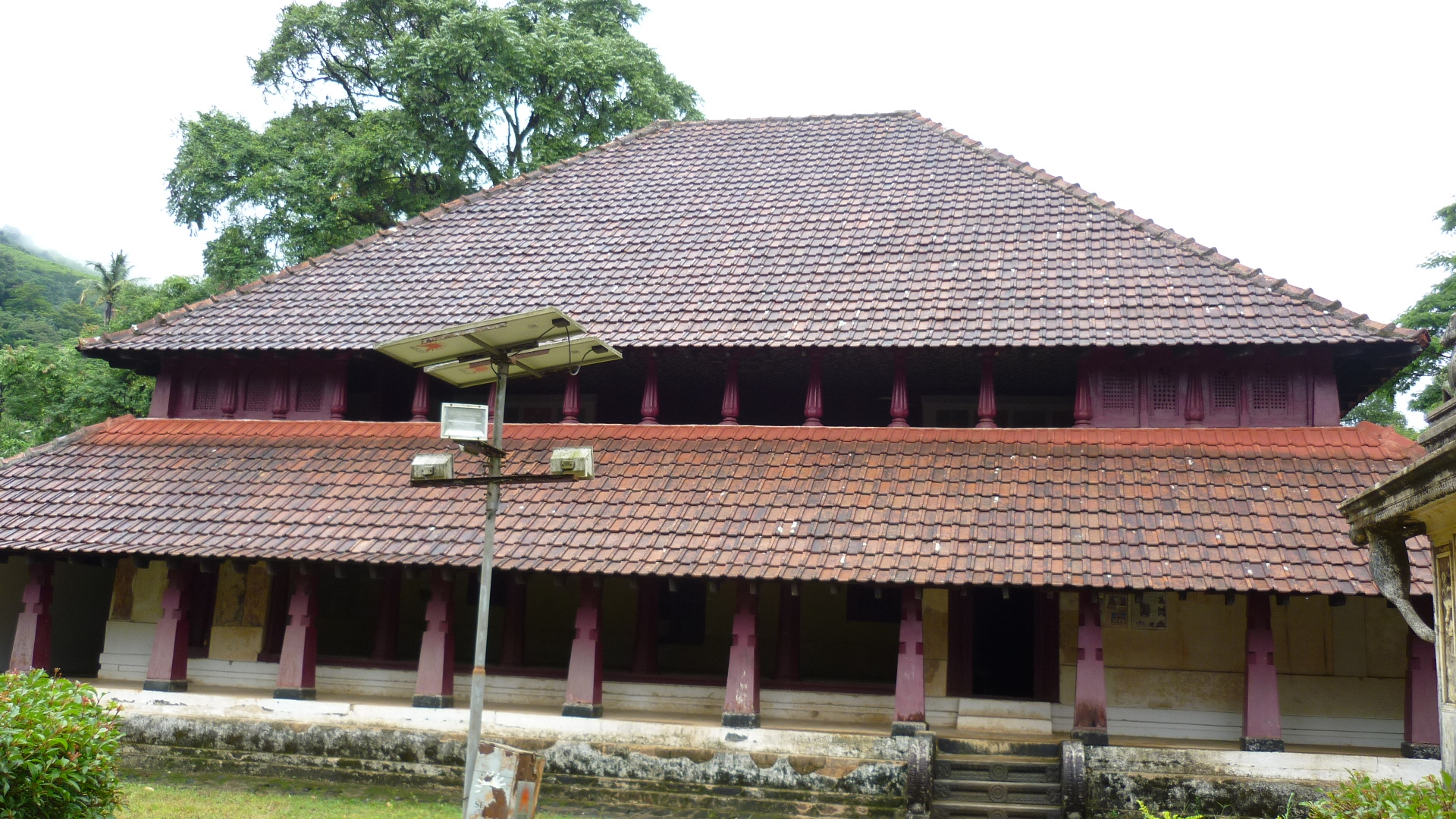
Nalknad Palace at Madikeri

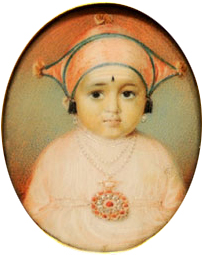
Chikka Vira Rajendra, The last King of Coorg (circa 1805)

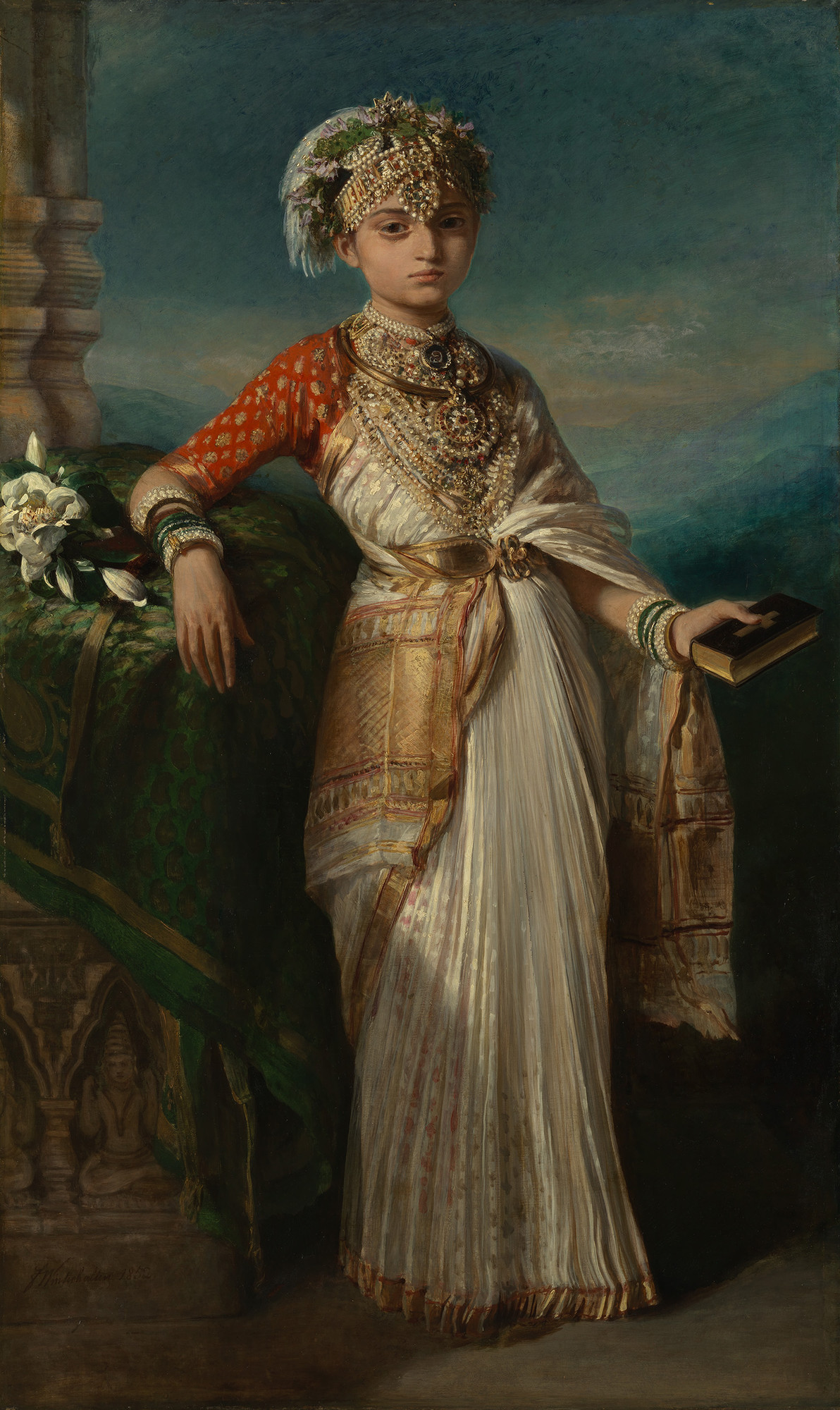
Princess Gouramma, who would later become Victoria Gouramma, the daughter of Chikka Virarajendra, the last king of Coorg, was adopted to be taken care by Queen Victoria.
