= Chikka Virarajendra =

Last ruler of the Kodagu (Coorg) kingdom in India

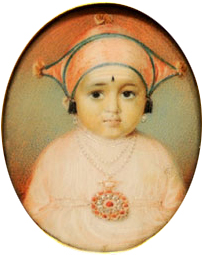
Chikka Vira Rajendra (circa 1805)

Chikavira Rajendra or Chikka Vira Rajendra (Kannada: ಚಿಕವೀರ/ಚಿಕ್ಕವೀರ ರಾಜೇಂದ್ರ, cika/cikka vīrarājendra) (also in other variations, including Chikkaveera Rajendra) was the last ruler of the Kodagu (Coorg) kingdom in South India. His actual name was Vira Rajendra, but this was the name of his uncle as well; as both of them were rulers of Kodagu, the prefix Chikka (Kannada and Kodava Takk for Younger) is used as a distinguisher. He was a son of Linga Rajendra II.

== Annexation of the kingdom ==
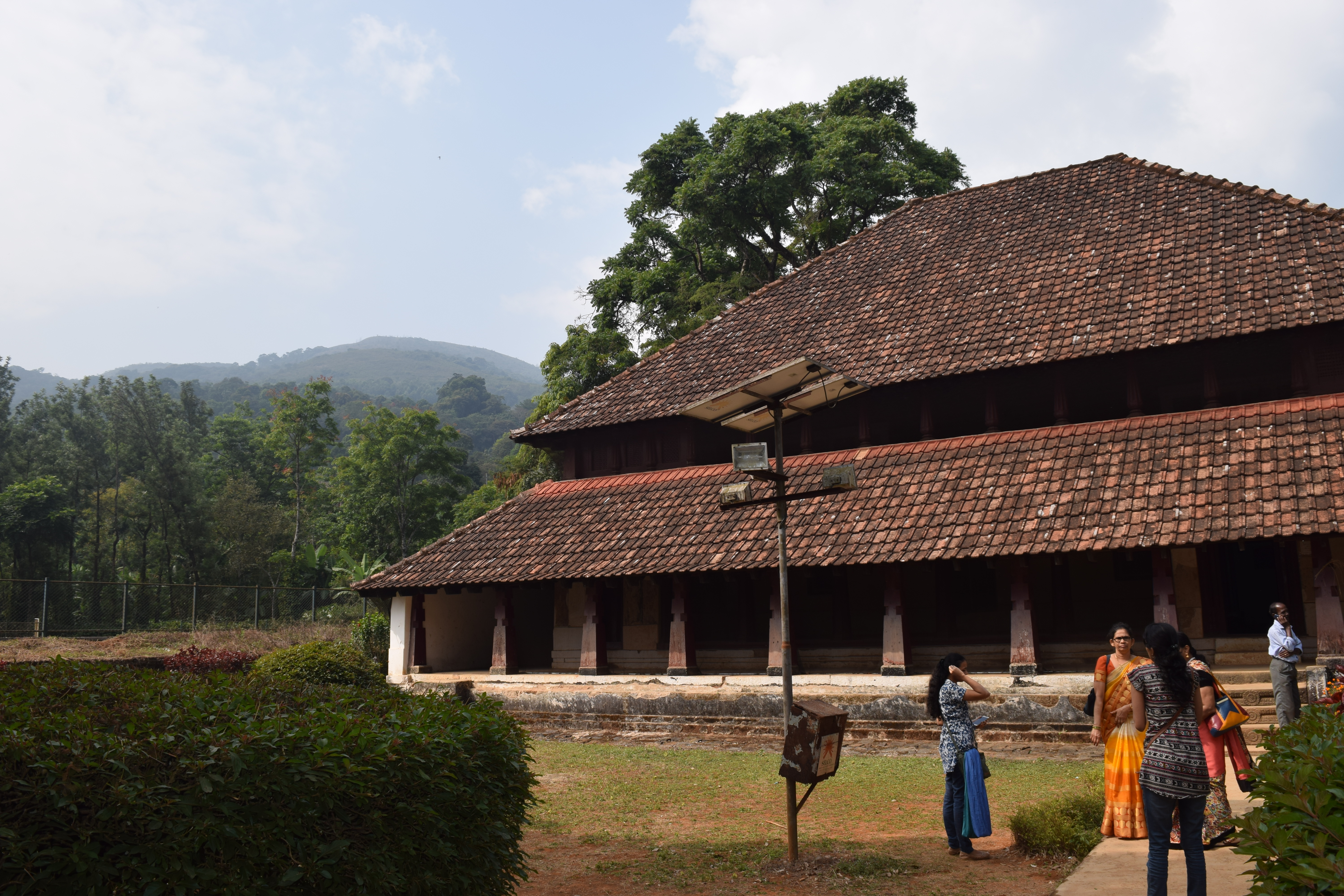
Nalknad Palace, Kodagu, where Chikka Veerarajendra took refuge before surrendering

On 24 April 1834 CE, he was deposed and exiled by the British; his kingdom was annexed into British India as a separate chief commissionership. He spent some years in Benares before going to England along with his favourite daughter Gouramma to plead in court for the return of his kingdom.

Chikkaveera Rajendra was deeply fascinated by literature and general knowledge, and he himself used to compose poems. He was proficient in Kannada and Persian languages, and he could speak Hindi, Tulu, English, and Urdu.

== London ==
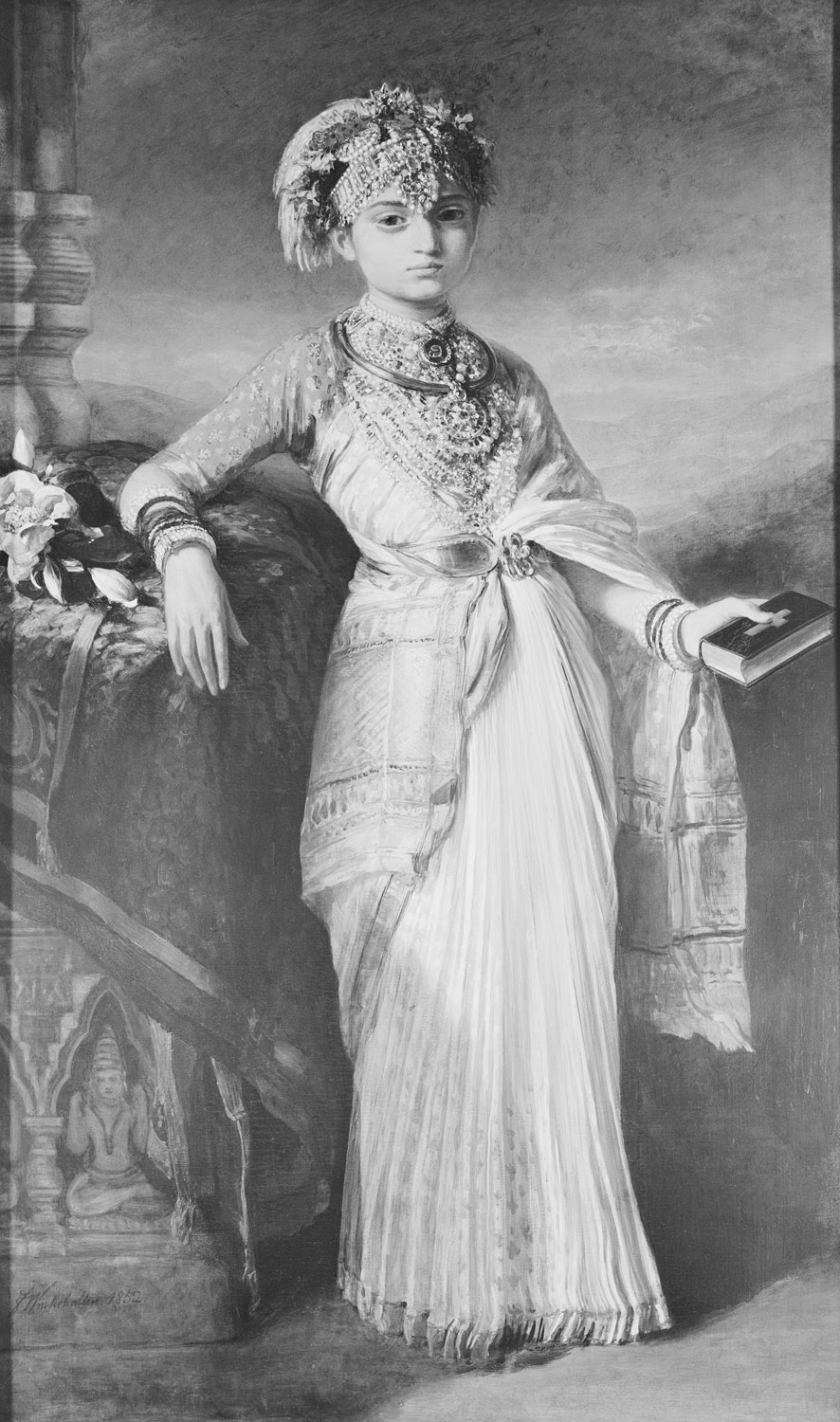
Gouramma, who would later become Victoria Gouramma, the daughter of Chikka Virarajendra, was adopted to be taken care by Queen Victoria.

The Rajah had lived in Benares for 14 years on an annual allowance of £12,000. One of his daughters, Muddama Mussamat (Ganga Maharani), became the third wife of Jung Bahadur Rana marrying at Benares in December 1850. He travelled to England by the Euxine, reaching Southampton on 12 May 1852 with two wives and his daughter accompanied by Major Drummond. They were moved to Radley's Hotel after dark and then on to London the next day by train. A local newspaper noted that the Rajah had given up his caste but his six servants were vegetarian and teetotalers who cooked in the open air behind the hotel and slept in the passages or under tables in the hotel.

Reaching London, the Ex-Rajah of Coorg made several pleas. On 18 November 1853, a letter was published in the London Standard where he described his situation. He pointed out that his uncle had helped General Abercrombie and the Bombay Army to pass through Coorg and join Cornwallis in 1799 and thereby helped the East India Company in its campaign against Tipoo Sultan. He also wrote about his brother-in-law Chen Busawah who made away to Mysore against the family in 1830. Chikka Rajendra had then requested the British to deliver Chen Busawah, who had also murdered some officers in the course of his escape into Mysore. The East India Company had responded that they could not deliver Chen Busawah as he had sought their protection. Some time later an East India Company messenger passing from Malabar to Mysore was detained by Chikka Rajendra. When he was not released, the Company forcibly took over the palace (taking away possessions that he claimed were worth £160,000). He had been held at Benares for 14 years and claimed that he was to be returned £180,000. He then went on to set the record right:

"To make the already overflowing cup of bitterness more galling, I am described in "Thornton's History of British India" as tyrannical, haughty, and everything that a prince or ruler ought not to be; in fact, that my whole life was one of vice and infamy;... not knowing or thinking that the party on whom he had lavished so many disgraceful epithets would ever be in this country to confront him, and not only to deny the truth of the statement, but to be willing, ready, and able to prove that there is no foundation for that which he has written"

His health declined and he died on 24 September 1859 at his residence 20, Clifton Villas, Warwick Road, Maida Hill West. His body was buried in Kensal Green Cemetery.

== In literature and media ==
The famous Kannada litterateur and Jnanpith Award recipient, Masti Venkatesha Iyengar, wrote a critically acclaimed book, Chikavira Rajendra, based on the life and times of that ruler. This book is widely noted for its balanced handling of the subject; it neither comprises a litany of the supposed misdeeds of the protagonist, nor emerges as a tract against the British. The book is redolent with the culture and ethos of its milieu, being Kodagu in the mid-19th century.

In the novel, Iyengar portrays Chikka Virarajendra as having had only one close confidant – his childhood friend, [Kunta 'lame'] Basava. In one instance, the king is depicted as having killed his sister's infant child (the son of his sister Devammaji and his brother-in-law Chenna Basava) in a fit of rage. With support for his rule rapidly diminishing, Chikka Virarajendra is on course for an all-out conflict with the British Raj and takes refuge in Nalknad Palace. The king kills Basava, charging him with sedition. (In reality Kunta Basava dies later when the British enter Kodagu, he is killed by unknown people) Chikka Virarajendra is unable to resist the British attack and with the invasion complete, is sent to exile in 1834. Iyengar won India's literary Jnanpith Award in 1983.

A television show based on this Kannada novel, named Anthimaraju, was scheduled to be broadcast in 1992 by Doordarshan, India's state run television network. The show was withdrawn by the network following protests from the Veerashaiva community and Kodavas over the depiction of this king as "devil incarnate".

== See also ==
- History of Kodagu
- Coorg War
