= Masti Venkatesha Iyengar =

Indian Kannada-language writer (1891–1986)

Masti Venkatesh Iyengar
- Born: 6 June 1891; Hungenahalli Malur taluk, Kolar district, Kingdom of Mysore
- Died: 6 June 1986 (aged 95); Bengaluru, Karnataka, India
- Occupations: Civil Servant; professor; writer
- Writing career
- Pen name: Srinivasa
- Genre: Fiction
- Subject: Kannada literature
- Movement: Navodaya

Masti Venkatesha Iyengar (6 June 1891 – 6 June 1986) was a well-known writer in Kannada language. He was the fourth among Kannada writers to be honored with the Jnanpith Award, the highest literary honor conferred in India. He was popularly referred to as Maasti Kannadada Aasti which means "Maasti, Kannada's Treasure". He is most renowned for his short stories. He wrote under the pen name Srinivasa. He was honoured with the title Rajasevasakta by then Maharaja of Mysore Nalvadi Krishnaraja Wadeyar.

== Early life and education ==
Maasti was born in 1891 at Hungenahalli in Kolar district of Karnataka in a Tamil speaking Sri Vaishnavite Iyengar Brahmin family. He spent his early childhood in Maasti village. He obtained a master's degree in English literature (Arts) in 1914 from Madras University. After joining the Indian Civil Service (Known as the Mysore Civil Service in the days of the Maharaja of Mysore), he held various positions of responsibility in different parts of Karnataka, rising to the rank of District Commissioner. After 26 years of service, he resigned in 1943, as a protest when he did not get the post equivalent to a Minister, which he felt that he deserved, and a junior was promoted ahead of him. He wrote some pieces in English and then switched to writing in the Kannada language. He often used the pen name Srinivasa.

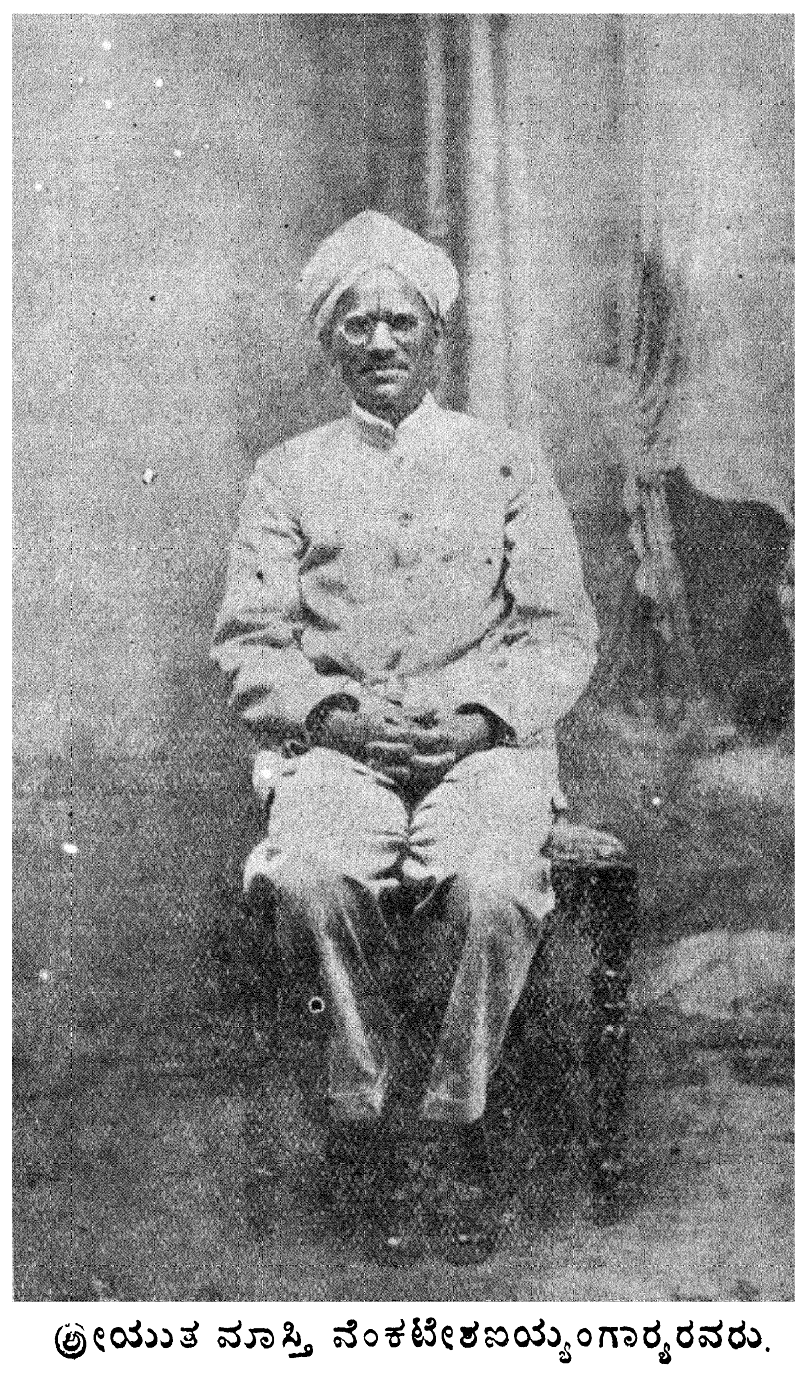
Masti Venkatesh Iyengar

Bust of Masti Venkatesha Iyengar at Dr. Rajkumar Children Park (Jinke Park), Bengaluru (2026)

== Works ==
He published his first work, Rangana Maduve in 1910. His last work was Maatugara Ramanna, from 1985. Kelavu Sanna Kathegalu (Some Short Stories) was his first notable work in modern Kannada literature. Maasti also crafted a number poems on various philosophic, aesthetic and social themes. He composed and translated several important plays and was the editor of the monthly journal Jivana (Life) from 1944 to 1965.

A prolific writer, he wrote more than 123 books in Kannada and 17 in English, over the course of seventy years. He won the Jnanpith Award in 1983 for his novel Chikka Veera Rajendra. The story was about the last Rajah of Kodagu.

== Demise ==
Masti Venkatesh Iyengar died on his 95th birthday in 1986.

== Commemorations ==
Since 1993, an award in his name, the "Masti Venkatesha Iyengar Award" is presented to well-known writers from Karnataka. His house is located in Basavanagudi area in Bangalore. His house, located in Maasti village, Maluru Taluk (Kolar District) has been converted into a library and maintained by the Government of Karnataka. Masti Residential School was started in his memory in 2006–07, at a nearby location.

== Bibliography ==
Epics

- Shri Rama Pattabisheka (Coronation of Shri Ram)

Novels

- Chikaveera Rajendra
- Channabasava Nayaka
- Subbana
- Sheshamma

Stories and Anthologies

- Kelavu Sanna Kathegalu (Some Short Stories)
- 100 Short stories in a number of volumes
- Ranga's Marriage
- Venkatashami's Love Affair

Plays

- Kakanakote
- Manjule
- Yashodhara
- Purandaradaasa
- Bhattara Magalu
- Shanthaa

Autobiography

- Bhaava (Three Volumes)

Other

- Subbanna (1928)
- Sheshamma (1976)
- Shanta (1923)
- Talikoti (1929)
- Yashodhara (1933)
- Kannadad Seve (1930)
- Arun (1924)
- Tavare (1930)
- Sankranti (1969)
