= IIHR =

IIHR may refer to:

- Indian Institute of Horticultural Research in Bengaluru, India
- Inter-American Institute of Human Rights in San José, Costa Rica
- International Institute of Human Rights in Strasbourg, France
- Iowa Institute of Hydraulic Research, part of the University of Iowa in Iowa City, United States
