= Mathkur =

Village in Karnataka, India

Mathkur is a village in India located near Bangalore North. It is part of the Shivakote Grama panchayat. Mathkur has a total population of 1,065, most of whom are farmers. The lake in this village is about 67 acres.

The village is close to the Indian Institute of Horticultural Research (IIHR) and an Indian Centre for Theoretical Research (ICTS) which is located near Kalenahalli.

Neighboring villages include Linganahalli, Kalenahalli, Ivarakandapura, Seethakempanahall and Kakol.

== Places of Worship ==
- Veerabhadraswamy temple
- Lord Shiva Temple
- Venkataramana Swamy temple
- Anjaneya Swamy Temple
- Poojamma Temple

== Educational institutions ==
- Government primary school

== Public Transport ==
- 266A from Mathkur to Market
- 266J from Mathkur to Majestic
- 285DA from Majestic to Hessaraghatta via Mathkur
- 253LA from Doddaballapur to Hessaraghatta via Mathkur
- 251G from Mathkur to Majestic
