= Sundaram Verma =

Indian environmentalist

- Born: Sikar, Rajasthan
- Education: Indian Agricultural Research Institute
- Occupation: Environmentalist
- Awards: Padma Shri

Sundaram Verma is an Indian environmentalist. He was awarded Padma Shri, India's fourth-highest civilian award in 2020, for developing the agricultural technique called ‘dryland agroforestry' which was developed to help tree plantation efforts in arid regions of India.

== Early life and career ==
Verma is a resident of the village called Danta located in Sikar, Rajasthan. After completing his graduation in 1972, Verma decided to pursue farming as a career. Verma studied dryland farming at the Indian Agricultural Research Institute in New Delhi through Krishi Vigyan Kendra (KVK). After working for 10 years, Verma developed a farming technique for arid regions wherein all kind of trees can be planted with just one litre of water. To date, Verma has planted over 50,000 trees.
