= Groundwater recharge =

Groundwater that recharges an aquifer

Water balance

Groundwater recharge or deep drainage or deep percolation is a hydrologic process, where water moves downward from surface water to groundwater. Recharge is the primary method through which water enters an aquifer. This process usually occurs in the vadose zone below plant roots and is often expressed as a flux to the water table surface. Groundwater recharge also encompasses water moving away from the water table farther into the saturated zone. Recharge occurs both naturally (through the water cycle) and through anthropogenic processes (i.e., "artificial groundwater recharge"), where rainwater and/or reclaimed water is routed to the subsurface.

The most common methods to estimate recharge rates are: chloride mass balance (CMB); soil physics methods; environmental and isotopic tracers; groundwater-level fluctuation methods; water balance (WB) methods (including groundwater models (GMs)); and the estimation of baseflow (BF) to rivers.

== Processes ==
=== Diffused or focused mechanisms ===
Groundwater recharge can occur through diffuse or focused mechanisms. Diffuse recharge occurs when precipitation infiltrates through the soil to the water table, and is by definition distributed over large areas. Focused recharge occurs where water leaks from surface water sources (rivers, lakes, wadis, wetlands) or land surface depressions, and generally becomes more dominant with aridity.

=== Natural recharge ===
Natural processes of groundwater recharge. Adjustments affecting the water table will drastically enhance or diminish the quality of groundwater recharge in a specific region.

Water is recharged naturally by rain and snow melt and to a smaller extent by surface water (rivers and lakes). Recharge may be impeded somewhat by human activities including paving, development, or logging. These activities can result in loss of topsoil resulting in reduced water infiltration, enhanced surface runoff and reduction in recharge. Use of groundwater, especially for irrigation, may also lower the water tables. Groundwater recharge is an important process for sustainable groundwater management, since the volume-rate abstracted from an aquifer in the long term should be less than or equal to the volume-rate that is recharged.

Recharge can help move excess salts that accumulate in the root zone to deeper soil layers, or into the groundwater system. Tree roots increase water saturation into groundwater reducing water runoff. Flooding temporarily increases river bed permeability by moving clay soils downstream, and this increases aquifer recharge.

==== Wetlands ====
Wetlands help maintain the level of the water table and exert control on the hydraulic head. This provides force for groundwater recharge and discharge to other waters as well. The extent of groundwater recharge by a wetland is dependent upon soil, vegetation, site, perimeter to volume ratio, and water table gradient. Groundwater recharge occurs through mineral soils found primarily around the edges of wetlands. The soil under most wetlands is relatively impermeable. A high perimeter to volume ratio, such as in small wetlands, means that the surface area through which water can infiltrate into the groundwater is high. Groundwater recharge is typical in small wetlands such as prairie potholes, which can contribute significantly to recharge of regional groundwater resources. Researchers have discovered groundwater recharge of up to 20% of wetland volume per season.

=== Artificial groundwater recharge ===
Managed aquifer recharge (MAR) strategies to augment freshwater availability include streambed channel modification, bank filtration, water spreading and recharge wells. A facility in Orange County, California cleans and injects 100 million gallons per day; or 90 billion gallons per year.

Artificial groundwater recharge is becoming increasingly important in India, where over-pumping of groundwater by farmers has led to underground resources becoming depleted. In 2007, on the recommendations of the International Water Management Institute, the Indian government allocated ₹1,800 crore (equivalent to ₹54 billion or US$640 million in 2023) to fund dug-well recharge projects (a dug-well is a wide, shallow well, often lined with concrete) in 100 districts within seven states where water stored in hard-rock aquifers had been over-exploited. Another environmental issue is the disposal of waste through the water flux such as dairy farms, industrial, and urban runoff.

Pollution in stormwater run-off collects in retention basins. Concentrating degradable contaminants can accelerate biodegradation. However, where and when water tables are high this affects appropriate design of detention ponds, retention ponds and rain gardens.

=== Depression-focused recharge ===
If water falls uniformly over a field such that field capacity of the soil is not exceeded, then negligible water percolates to groundwater. If instead water puddles in low-lying areas, the same water volume concentrated over a smaller area may exceed field capacity resulting in water that percolates down to recharge groundwater. The larger the relative contributing runoff area is, the more focused infiltration is. The recurring process of water that falls relatively uniformly over an area, flowing to groundwater selectively under surface depressions is depression focused recharge. Water tables rise under such depressions.

Depression focused groundwater recharge can be very important in arid regions. More rain events are capable of contributing to groundwater supply.

Depression focused groundwater recharge also profoundly effects contaminant transport into groundwater. This is of great concern in regions with karst geological formations because water can eventually dissolve tunnels all the way to aquifers, or otherwise disconnected streams. This extreme form of preferential flow, accelerates the transport of contaminants and the erosion of such tunnels. In this way depressions intended to trap runoff water—before it flows to vulnerable water resources—can connect underground over time. Cavitation of surfaces above into the tunnels, results in potholes or caves.

Deeper ponding exerts pressure that forces water into the ground faster. Faster flow dislodges contaminants otherwise adsorbed on soil and carries them along. This can carry pollution directly to the raised water table below and into the groundwater supply. Thus, the quality of water collecting in infiltration basins is of special concern.

== Estimation methods ==
Rates of groundwater recharge are difficult to quantify. This is because other related processes, such as evaporation, transpiration (or evapotranspiration) and infiltration processes must first be measured or estimated to determine the balance. There are no widely applicable method available that can directly and accurately quantify the volume of rainwater that reaches the water table.

The most common methods to estimate recharge rates are: chloride mass balance (CMB); soil physics methods; environmental and isotopic tracers; groundwater-level fluctuation methods; water balance (WB) methods (including groundwater models (GMs)); and the estimation of baseflow (BF) to rivers.

Regional, continental and global estimates of recharge commonly derive from global hydrological models.

=== Physical ===
Physical methods use the principles of soil physics to estimate recharge. The direct physical methods are those that attempt to actually measure the volume of water passing below the root zone. Indirect physical methods rely on the measurement or estimation of soil physical parameters, which along with soil physical principles, can be used to estimate the potential or actual recharge. After months without rain the level of the rivers under humid climate is low and represents solely drained groundwater. Thus, the recharge can be calculated from this base flow if the catchment area is already known.

=== Chemical ===
Chemical methods use the presence of relatively inert water-soluble substances, such as an isotopic tracer or chloride, moving through the soil, as deep drainage occurs.

=== Numerical models ===
Recharge can be estimated using numerical methods, using such codes as Hydrologic Evaluation of Landfill Performance, UNSAT-H, SHAW (short form of Simultaneous Heat and Water Transfer model), WEAP, and MIKE SHE. The 1D-program HYDRUS1D is available online. The codes generally use climate and soil data to arrive at a recharge estimate and use the Richards equation in some form to model groundwater flow in the vadose zone.

== Factors affecting groundwater recharge ==
=== Climate change ===
The impacts of climate change on groundwater may be greatest through its indirect effects on irrigation water demand via increased evapotranspiration. There is an observed declined in groundwater storage in many parts of the world. This is due to more groundwater being used for irrigation activities in agriculture, particularly in drylands. Some of this increase in irrigation can be due to water scarcity issues made worse by effects of climate change on the water cycle. Direct redistribution of water by human activities amounting to ~24,000 km^{3} per year is about double the global groundwater recharge each year.

Climate change causes changes to the water cycle which in turn affect groundwater in several ways: There can be a decline in groundwater storage, and reduction in groundwater recharge and water quality deterioration due to extreme weather events. In the tropics intense precipitation and flooding events appear to lead to more groundwater recharge.

However, the exact impacts of climate change on groundwater are still under investigation. This is because scientific data derived from groundwater monitoring is still missing, such as changes in space and time, abstraction data and "numerical representations of groundwater recharge processes".

Effects of climate change could have different impacts on groundwater storage: The expected more intense (but fewer) major rainfall events could lead to increased groundwater recharge in many environments. But more intense drought periods could result in soil drying-out and compaction which would reduce infiltration to groundwater.

=== Urbanization ===
Further implications of groundwater recharge are a consequence of urbanization. Research shows that the recharge rate can be up to ten times higher in urban areas compared to rural regions. This is explained through the vast water supply and sewage networks supported in urban regions in which rural areas are not likely to obtain. Recharge in rural areas is heavily supported by precipitation, and this is the opposite for urban areas. Road networks and infrastructure within cities prevent surface water from percolating into the soil, resulting in most surface runoff entering storm drains for local water supply. As urban development continues to spread across various regions, groundwater recharge rates will increase relative to the existing rates of the previous rural region. A consequence of sudden influxes in groundwater recharge includes flash flooding. The ecosystem will have to adjust to the elevated groundwater surplus due to groundwater recharge rates. Additionally, road networks are less permeable compared to soil, resulting in higher amounts of surface runoff. Therefore, urbanization increases the rate of groundwater recharge and reduces infiltration, resulting in flash floods as the local ecosystem accommodates changes to the surrounding environment.

== Adverse factors ==
- Drainage
- Impervious surfaces
- Soil compaction
- Groundwater pollution

== See also ==
- Aquifer storage and recovery
- Bioswale
- Contour trenching
- Depression focused recharge
- Dry well
- Groundwater model
- Groundwater remediation
- Groundwater recharge in California
- Hydrology (agriculture)
- Infiltration (hydrology)
- International trade and water
- Peak water
- Rainwater harvesting
- Soil salinity control by subsurface drainage
- Subsurface dyke
- Watertable control
