= List of agricultural centres established by CCS HAU =

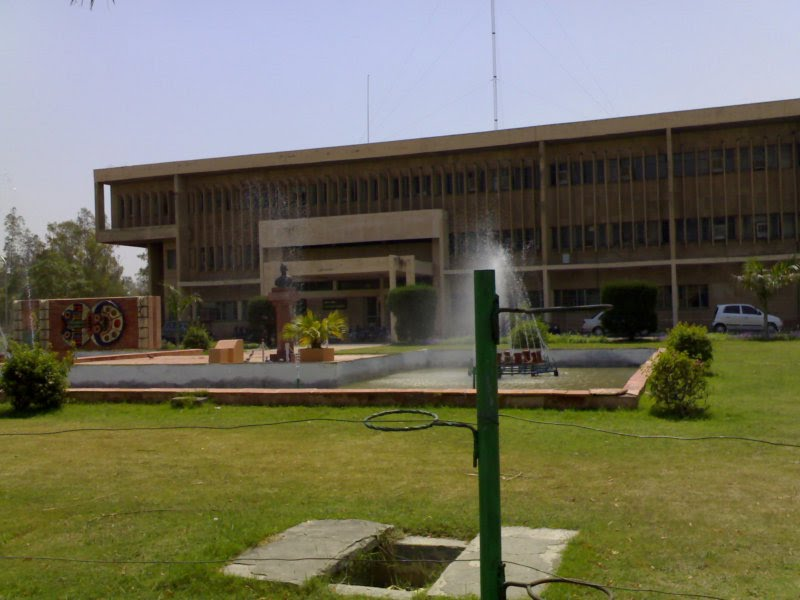
Fletcher Bhawan, administrative office of the university.

Chaudhary Charan Singh Haryana Agricultural University (CCS HAU) is a public funded agricultural university located at Hisar in the Indian state of Haryana. It is one of the biggest agricultural universities in Asia. It is named after India's seventh prime minister, Chaudhary Charan Singh.

It was initially a satellite campus of Punjab Agricultural University at Hisar. After formation of Haryana, it was declared as an autonomous institution. It was established as a university by Haryana and Punjab Agricultural Universities Act, ratified 2 February 1970 and was named as Haryana Agricultural University. On 31 October 1991, it was renamed as Chaudhary Charan Singh Haryana Agricultural University. A. L. Fletcher was the first Vice-Chancellor of the university.

The university publishes the largest number of research papers among agricultural universities in India. It won the Indian Council of Agricultural Research's Award for the Best Institute in 1997. It contributed significantly to Green Revolution and White Revolution in India.

The Directorate of Extension Education started establishing Krishi Gyan Kendra (Agricultural Knowledge Centres) in districts of the state of Haryana from 1966. A total of eleven Krishi Gyan Kendra (KGK) were established till 1979. In 1989, the process was remodelled and the new centres have been named as Krishi Vigyan Kendra (Farm Service Centres). One Krishi Vigyan Kendra (KVK) has been established in each district of Haryana. They have been established to spread information about relevant technologies among farmers, rural youth and rural development agencies. They were established with funding from Indian Council of Agricultural Research. As of 2012, there are a total of 11 KGKs and 19 KVKs. They also provide vocational training on agriculture related courses.

The first Kisan Sewa Kendra (Agricultural Technology Information Centre) was established at the university main campus in 2002. As of 2012, there are a total of three Kisan Sewa Kendra (KSKs). Seeds of various crops, fruits, vegetables, fertilisers and Animal products are provided to farmers at subsidised rates through these centres. Toll-free helpline agricultural services are also provided to farmers through the KSKs.

== Krishi Gyan Kendra ==
Name	Location	Founded	References
Krishi Gyan Kendra	Ambala	1966	
Krishi Gyan Kendra	Bhiwani	1972	
Krishi Gyan Kendra	Faridabad	1979	
Krishi Gyan Kendra	Gurgaon	1966	
Krishi Gyan Kendra	Hisar	1966	
Krishi Gyan Kendra	Karnal	1966	
Krishi Gyan Kendra	Kurukshetra	1974	
Krishi Gyan Kendra	Mahendragarh	1966	
Krishi Gyan Kendra	Rohtak	1966	
Krishi Gyan Kendra	Sirsa	1972	
Krishi Gyan Kendra	Sonipat	1974	

== Krishi Vigyan Kendra ==
As of July 2023, HAU has 20 Krishi Vigyan Kendras in Haryana.

Name	Location	Founded	Awards	Staff	References
Krishi Vigyan Kendra, Ambala	Ambala	2002	Farmer Study Tour Award by NABARD (2001–02); Farmer Study Tour Award by NABARD (2002–03)	-	
Krishi Vigyan Kendra, Bhiwani	Bhiwani	2002	-	-	
Krishi Vigyan Kendra, Bhopani	Faridabad	1992	Best presentation of Progress Report by CCS HAU (2005–06)	-	
Krishi Vigyan Kendra, Fatehabad	Fatehabad	2002	-	-	
Krishi Vigyan Kendra, Sadalpur	Hisar	1989	-	-	
Krishi Vigyan Kendra, Jhajjar	Jhajjar	2002	-	-	
Krishi Vigyan Kendra, Pandu Pindara	Jind	1992	-	-	
Krishi Vigyan Kendra, Kaithal	Kaithal	1992	-	-	
Krishi Vigyan Kendra, Uchani	Karnal	2002	-	-	
Krishi Vigyan Kendra, Kurukshetra	Kurukshetra	1992	Pandit Deen Dayal Upadhyay Krishi Protsahan Puruskar 2017	-	
Krishi Vigyan Kendra, Mahendragarh	Mahendragarh	2002	-	-	
Krishi Vigyan Kendra, Chappera	Nuh^{[a]}	2023	-	-	30 acres campus.
Krishi Vigyan Kendra, Mandkola	Nuh^{[a]}	1970	-	-	
Krishi Vigyan Kendra, Panchkula	Panchkula	2002	-	-	
Krishi Vigyan Kendra, Ujha	Panipat	1994	-	-	
Krishi Vigyan Kendra, Bawal	Rewari	2001	-	-	
Krishi Vigyan Kendra, Rohtak	Rohtak	2002	-	-	
Krishi Vigyan Kendra, Sirsa	Sirsa	2002	-	-	
Krishi Vigyan Kendra, Jagdishpur	Sonipat	1992	-	-	
Krishi Vigyan Kendra, Damla	Yamunanagar	1992	-	-	

== Kisan Sewa Kendra ==
Name	Location	Founded	References
Kisan Sewa Kendra, Hisar	Hisar	2002	
Kisan Sewa Kendra, Uchani	Karnal	2002	
Kisan Sewa Kendra, Bawal	Rewari	2002	

== Notes ==
- ^{a} Krishi Vigyan Kendra was established at Gurgaon in 1970 and was shifted to Mewat in 2002.

== See also ==
- Centres of Excellence in Horticulture in Haryana, established across various districts of Haryana under Maharana Pratap Horticultural University
- List of agricultural universities and colleges
- Agricultural Universities (India)
- Indian Council of Agricultural Research
- Krishi Vigyan Kendra, Kannur
- Krishi Vigyan Kendra, Jalgaon Jamod
