= Creative Extension =

The Krishi Vigyan Kendra, Kannur under Kerala Agricultural University near Taliparamba has pioneered a new branch of agricultural extension called creative extension.

== What is Creative Extension ==
Creative Extension uses art forms for agricultural communication. It calls for the involvement of people with histrionic talents. Creative Extension is the brainchild of Dr. K. Abdul Kareem, an agricultural extensionist of India Art as a medium for extension is hardly a novel experiment. What makes the initiative of Krishi Vigyan Kendra Kannur to disseminate agricultural information through entertainment different is that it seeks to preserve Kerala's vanishing folk song tradition in the agrarian culture. In an attempt to preserve this rural song tradition, the KVK has brought out an audio cassette with 10 songs and an audio CD with 11 songs that draw on the folk songs that used to reverberate in the paddy fields in the State.

== Folk songs ==
The tunes of these songs have been used to tune the songs in the cassette entitled `Vayalkili-vol I.' and CD entitled, `Vayalkili-vol II.' "We are losing our cultural heritage and our folk songs, which are the pulse of our rural culture," says K. Raghavan Master, veteran music director, in his introduction to the songs. The KVK's objective is to popularise the songs among farmers in the region and to introduce the indigenous cultural legacy to the new generation. The farmers' response to the songs vindicates the initiative. Collecting the traditional agrarian songs is a difficult task, but worth doing. M.P. Giridharan, Associate Professor at Regional Agricultural Research Station at Pilikode in Kasaragod, has written the lyrics of two songs in the cassette and four songs in the CD. The songs have been set to tune by former KVK employee and singer M.P. Jayasree, who along with M.A. Rajivkumar, has sung the songs.

== Mushroom songs (Koonpattukal) ==
As part of its Creative Extension series the Krishi Vigyan Kendra has conceived and produced an audio CD containing songs on Mushroom production

== Thenkili (songs on animal rearing) ==
As part of its Creative Extension series the Krishi Vigyan Kendra, Kannur has conceived and produced an audio CD containing songs on animal (cow, goat, Japanese quail, rabbit) rearing

== Video albums ==
As part of its Creative Extension series the Krishi Vigyan Kendra, Kannur has conceived and produced video CD containing songs and visual on scientific animal (goat, Japanese quail) rearing

== Tele-cine-drama ==
The Kendra has also brought out a tele-cine-drama `Thengukalude Nilavili' to disseminate awareness about the importance of group action, compact area group approach (CAGA) to solve problems like coconut mite. The central character in it is an aged coconut grower who treats coconut palms in his homestead as his children. Thanks to the intervention of an agricultural officer, who exhorts that the farmers should treat all coconut palms in the area as their children and not just the ones in individual homestead. The KVK seeks to satisfy the farmers' entertainment needs in its communication for development. Information in the forms of songs and tele-cine-drama and their dissemination through cassettes and CDs will make an impact.
