= H. C. Javaraya =

Indian horticulturist (1889–1946)

H. C. Javaraya (1889-1946) was an Indian horticulturist who was the first Indian superintendent at the Lal Bagh Botanical Gardens in Bangalore. He also set up the Fruit Research Station in Hessarghatta, which is now the Indian Institute of Horticultural Research.

== Life and work ==
Javaraya was born in Madikeri, Kodagu district, and his schooling was at St Joseph's European High School, Bangalore and Central High School, Madikere. He then joined Central College, Bangalore where he pursued a degree in Arts. In 1913, he completed his formal education in agriculture from the Coimbatore Agricultural College. Soon after graduating, he married his wife Nagamma, who hailed from a village in Hassan district. On 18 July 1913, he joined the Mysore Horticultural Society as assistant superintendent, where he worked under Gustav Hermann Krumbiegel. In the late 1910s, Javaraya went on to train at the Royal Botanic Gardens, Kew.

In the early 1930s, Javaraya came back to India. Gustav Hermann Krumbiegel, who was then the superintendent of Lal Bagh, recommended Javaraya as his 'worthy successor'. In 1934, Javaraya was appointed as the senior marketing officer at the newly formed Agricultural Produce Department of Greater India. During his time there, he helped start the Agmark certification mark. As part of his duties as the director of horticulture, he was entrusted with managing the Brindavan Gardens and the Royal Fruit Orchard, 'Madhuvana'.

== Later years and honours ==
In 1935, Javaraya extended the Lal Bagh glasshouse by adding a fourth, eastern wing using steel from Bhadravathi Iron and Steel.

Javaraya founded the Government Fruit Research Station (FRS) in Hessaraghatta (now the Indian Institute of Horticultural Research), the Maddur Fruit Orchard, and the Ganjam Fig Garden.

During his time at Kew, Javaraya received the Kew Garden Fellowship, the Royal Horticultural Society (FRHS) fellowship, and was a fellow of the Linnean Society of London (FLS).

In 1940, he was given the title “Rao Bahadur” by the then viceroy of India. The roundabout outside the main gate of Lal Bagh is known as Rao Bahadur HC Javaraya Circle.
