= Groundwater recharge in California =

Groundwater recharge is the process of water being absorbed into the ground from precipitation, snowmelt, or artificial processes. Intentional groundwater recharge uses large, open basins that allow water to slowly seep into the ground. This water is filtered by sediment while traveling underground and is pumped back to the surface as a source of freshwater. In California, groundwater accounts for around 41% of the state's total water supply, although this number varies between wet and dry years. During years of greater than average rainfall, less groundwater is used to allow for reserves to be available during dry years. Up to 60% of all water can be sourced from groundwater during dry years. The amount of water in underground aquifers is carefully monitored by the State Water Resources Control Board and other regional water resource boards.

== Benefits ==
Groundwater recharge is primarily utilized as a method of water storage to safeguard against water scarcity during prolonged years of drought. California's dry climate makes droughts a common occurrence, especially in Southern California. Surface water sources like reservoirs, lakes, and rivers can quickly run low during dry years. Storing water underground during years of increased rainfall relieves pressure from the surface water sources and lessens the need for imported water during dry years.

Another advantage of groundwater recharge is that it is one of the cheapest sources of water available when compared to desalination, recycled water, imported water, or reservoir expansion. As a result, investment into groundwater recharge basins has been steadily increasing in recent years. Groundwater projects are planned to provide an increase of 500,000 acre-feet annually to the water supply. With 2023 being an extreme wet year, California achieved a record-setting 8.7 million acre-feet of groundwater to aquifers.

== Legislation ==
Passed in 2014, the Sustainable Groundwater Management Act (SGMA) regulates the amount of water being received and taken from groundwater basins. The goal of this act is to develop sustainability plans for each groundwater basin in order to keep the groundwater supply balanced. The plans are put in place to avoid overdrafted basins, where the amount of water being taken out is greater than the amount sustainable in the long term. This can be harmful to groundwater because overdrafting makes it more susceptible to contamination from naturally occurring arsenic deposits or chemical pesticides. Overdrafting can also cause underground sources of seawater to leach into aquifers, making the freshwater impure and brackish. Aquifers in the southern Central Valley have become some of the most overdrafted in the state due to the water-dependent agricultural economy of the region. The progress of groundwater sustainability plans by region are supervised by the California Department of Water Resources.

== Notable basins ==
Groundwater aquifers are distributed throughout all of California, with a large density of recharge basins located in Southern California around Los Angeles, Riverside, Orange, and San Bernardino counties. Surface water is more prevalent in the north, where residents generally rely less on groundwater for their total water supply. Bay area residents acquire around 20% of their total water from groundwater.

=== Chino Basin ===
The Chino Basin is situated along the Santa Ana River Watershed in San Bernardino County. This watershed extends over a large area from the inland mountains surrounding Big Bear all the way to Huntington Beach. The Chino basin program draws water from runoff and snowmelt in the region containing Mount Baldy, Mount San Jacinto, and Big Bear. Water is supplied throughout cities located in southern San Bernardino County including Ontario, Chino Hills, and others.

== Future expansion ==
Groundwater recharge projects are expected to increase in number in future years throughout California due to the comparatively low cost and massive storage capabilities of aquifers. The total volume of groundwater capacity is estimated to be 850 million acre-feet, while there is only around 50 million acre-feet of available surface freshwater in the state. Future groundwater projects plan to exploit this storage capacity and conserve as much water as possible in groundwater sources.

== Impact on agriculture ==
As urban population centers expand throughout California, an increasing amount of groundwater has been diverted to cities and away from agriculture. Around 62% of total water goes to California's large agricultural industry. The most produced products in California include dairy, almonds, and grapes. Producing these products needs a large amount of water and requires farmers to practice efficient farming methods. Agriculture is one of the biggest industries in California and contains some of the most profitable farmland in the United States. Protection of groundwater resources is vital for maintaining California's multi-billion dollar agricultural sector and sustaining the regions that depend on Californian exports.

== Sustainability and environmental impact ==
Water recharge projects maintain close communication with biologists and other researchers to ensure native habitats and species are not negatively impacted by basin construction. Protected species are closely monitored to ensure that projects will not impede on their habitats. Protected species in California include the Santa Ana Suckerfish and the Kangaroo Rat.
