= Krishi Vigyan Kendra, Jalgaon Jamod =

Indian research institute

Krishi Vigyan Kendra, Jalgaon Jamod is established in Buldhana district, Maharashtra, India during 1994 by the Indian Council of Agricultural Research, New Delhi. It is hosted by Satpuda Education Society, a Non-Government Organisation based in Jalgaon Jamod As of 2018, it is one of 680 KVKs in India."

== See also ==
- Van Vigyan Kendra (VVK) Forest Science Centres
- Krishi Vigyan Kendra
