= Subsurface dyke =

A subsurface dyke is a structure that is built in an aquifer with the intention of obstructing the natural flow of ground water, thereby raising the ground water level and increasing the amount of water stored in the aquifer. Acting as an underground barrier impermeable to water, it controls the groundwater flow in an aquifer and raises the water table.

== Introduction ==
Although the total amount of water on Earth is generally assumed to have remained virtually constant, the rapid growth in population, together with the extension of irrigated agriculture and industrial development, are putting stress on the quality and quantity aspects of natural system. Several institutions have experimented with the use of subsurface dykes to conserve water in water-scarce areas. The ideal location for a dyke is a well defined, wide, greatly sloping valley with a narrow outlet having limited thickness of loose soil or porous rock on the top with massive or impervious rock below. A subsurface dyke has many advantages. It does not require additional surface reservoir, there is no loss of agricultural land, there is minimum evaporation loss since the storage is subsurface, there is no siltation and loss of reservoir capacity, the cost of maintenance is negligible, and it is relatively environment-friendly.

One such example was a recent sub-surface dyke constructed in India. For more information about this project, see Krishi Vigyan Kendra Kannur.

== Other water harvesting technologies ==
Other rainwater harvesting technologies include stone pitched contour bunds, dry rubble check dams, protection of seasonal spring by afforestation, moisture conservation pits, sprinkler and drip irrigation and roof water harvesting system.
