= Krishi Vigyan Kendra Kannur =

Agricultural research institute in Kerala, India

- Industry: Agriculture
- Founded: 30 March 2004; 22 years ago in Panniyoor, Kerala, India

Krishi Vigyan Kendra Kannur is a front-line agricultural extension center and one of the 700 KVKs financed by the Indian Council of Agricultural Research (ICAR). It opened on 30 March 2004 on the premises of Pepper Research Station, Panniyoor under Kerala Agricultural University. KVK primarily works to influence the other extension systems of the district, caters to the training needs of the farmers and extension functionaries, and facilitates the spread of technologies tailored to the diverse environment of farmers.

== Thrust areas ==
The activities of the Kendra are focused to address the prioritized agricultural problems of the district and identified thrust areas.

=== Integrated and sustainable homestead farming and soil and water management ===
- Replenishment of soil fertility especially in high land area
- Processing and value addition
- Integrated disease and Pest management (IPDM)
- Women empowerment
- Increasing production/income
- Market-led extension
- Promotion of location specific HYVs/breeds
- Scientific management of livestock
- Promotion of micro enterprises/overcoming rural unemployment
- Mechanization/development of skilled labour

== Location ==
The station is at the Pepper Research Station Campus at Poovam, which is 8 km from Taliparamba towards Alakkode route in Kannur district.

== On farm testing (OFT) ==
=== Mite control ===
KVK has carried out field trials of a compact area group approach (CAGA) for mite control at Vellavu in Pariyaram panchayat. Limits against coconut mite was discussed in the state assembly. Under a Creative Extension programme, the Krishi Vigyan Kendra Kannur produced a tele-cine-drama titled Thengukalude Nilavili (Screaming coconut palms) as part of a Compact area group approach (CAGA) implemented at Vellavu under Pariyaram grama panchayat limits. The film gained wide acceptance, and the Director of Agriculture in the government of Kerala accorded sanction for the purchase of 1088 CDs of Thengukalude Nilavili by the principal agricultural officers of all districts from the KVK, Kannur for screening in all Grama Panchayaths of the state through Krishi Bhavanas. The telefilm is the first of its kind aimed at bringing about changes in the mindset of farmers.

=== Phytophthora ===
Crop loss due to severe incidence of Phytophthora foot rot disease of black pepper and poor adoption of the technological recommendations against the disease — as they are labour- and cost-intensive — is a major problem for the pepper farmers of Kannur district. Hence, an OFT was undertaken to tackle this problem.

== Front-line demonstrations (FLDs) ==
=== FLD on stem bleeding of coconut ===
Technologies to control stem bleeding disease of coconut was convincingly demonstrated to the farmers of Sreekandapuram area. Farmers accepted the technology and the Panchayat included the technology in their annual plan. The message spreads through mass media.

=== Coir pith compost for the management of moisture stress in rain-fed coconut ===
To demonstrate the benefits of coir pith compost in combating the moisture stress in coconuts, this FLD was implemented at Kudiyanmala. It created a great impact on the local coir industry. In Kannur district, there are 36 cooperative societies and 25 private coir industries. The coir pith waste from these industries creates serious environmental problems. KVK, Kannur recognized the potential of coir pith and implemented this FLD. One of the cooperative societies, Kudiyanmala Coir Vyavasaya Sangham approached KVK for training on coir pith compost making. After the training the society initiated the composting by producing 12 tons of quality compost. The society became rejuvenated and this small intervention brought considerable benefits through waste disposal, soil enrichment, moisture conservation and employment generation.

=== Subsurface Dyke ===
The sub-surface dyke constructed at Krishi Vigyan Kendra, Kannur at Panniyur near Taliparamba under Kerala Agricultural University with the support of ICAR as part of demonstrating rain water harvesting technologies has become a living example for an effective method for ground water conservation. A trench was made across the valley portion of the undulating topography of the farm down to the bed rock. Three layers of plastic sheets were spread on the wall of the trench from ground level to the bed rock level. The plastic sheet on the wall measured 40m in length with a maximum depth of 8 m. It obstructs the flow of sub surface water raising water table in the catchment area.

The dyke was constructed in the 25 hectare farm of Krishi Vigyan Kendra Kannur in 2007 to solve the problem of water scarcity. The experience of KVK indicated that subsurface dyke was an efficient barrier to arrest the subsurface flow of water and conserve ground water. The rate of depletion of drainable water in the catchment area due to the typical undulating topography could be efficiently arrested by the dyke. The dyke resulted in the maintenance of higher water table in the catchment area for a longer period of time. There is an existing dug out pond with top length of 12 m, width 8m a depth 5m in the upstream side of the dyke. The pond is the only source of water in the KVK farm. The pond, which usually gets dried up in the summer is now maintaining a high water table throughout the year as the dyke ensures an incessant supply of water to the pond. Weekly data on the ground water level were recorded using water level recorder. The data showed that significantly higher level of water table was maintained in the catchment area (upstream area) compared to down stream area. Taking into account the mean depth of soil as 2 m the catchment area as 1.5ha (the actual area is 15 ha) and the drainable porosity as 10%, the total water storage capacity of the dyke would be 3000 m3. The crops cultivated in the catchment area would be benefited by way of constant capillary feeding of the rhizosphere. Kerala receives, on an average, more than 3000mm of rainfall per annum which is concentrated to the months of June to October. Due to the typical undulating topography of the state, the excess rain received is mostly lost through runoff. Immediately on cessation of rains subsurface water drains off along the slope resulting in poor retention of water in the catchment area. In spite of the heavy rainfall received in Kerala, the state experiences severe drought during summer months due to inefficient utilisation of rain water. In a state like Kerala, where the pressure on land is very high surface storage of water in large reservoirs with their adverse ecological impact is not an economic proposition. Alternatively, structures like subsurface dyke are most ideal for in situ conservation of rainfall received in a watershed.

== Training ==
=== Nursery techniques ===
A number of groups and individuals who received vocational training subsequently started horticultural nurseries.

=== Mushroom production ===
The KVK conducts vocational training on mushroom cultivation, spawn production and value addition. After completion of the training programme a group of trainees formed a club under the patronage of KVK and registered with the name Malabar Mushrooms.

=== Trichoderma production ===
KVK formed a women's self-help group (SHG) with 17 ex trainees, who have undergone training on trichoderma, nursery techniques and banana fibre extraction. The group was named Pulari and they are a human resource to KVK production units.

=== Cashew apple processing ===
An ex-trainee, Tomochan Syriac, started the first-ever cashew apple processing unit in the district under the brand name TOMCO.

=== Coconut climbing ===
To address the paucity of coconut climbers in the district, KVK conducts vocational training for rural youth in coconut climbing and plant protection. The Kendra also conducts training on coconut climbing using climbing machine developed by Dar. M.J. Joseph.

== Credit facilities ==
To facilitate beneficiary farmers and entrepreneurs Krishi Vigyan Kendra, Kannur (Kerala) took initiative in collaboration with State Bank of India (SBI) and opened a ‘SBI-KVK Loan Window’ at KVK which offers hassle-free credit facilities. This facility was operational 2 March 2009. With this facility, farmers and entrepreneurs who benefited from KVK on technologies in agriculture and allied fields through vocational training and other income generating activities will be able to get credit facilities to start their vocations. In addition, they would be provided with information regarding subsidies from agencies like District Industries Centre. The main target group of the SBI-KVK Loan Window is KVK farm families. With the introduction of this single window facility, trainees could discuss plans of action on reaping harvest of the technologies advocated by KVK trainers with the bankers on the spot. Initially the Loan Window would be open once a week. State Bank of India has deputed an officer to operate the counter so that farmers’ needs could be well-assessed (financially and technologically) under KVK guidance. In addition, support for project preparation and loan processing would also be given at the loan window.

== Plant Health Clinic ==
There is a Plant Health Clinic functioning at the Kendra. Plant and soil samples are analysed for major and minor nutrients at the clinic.

== Other activities ==
KVK has also been involved with Farmers' Science Congress, Subsurface dyke, and the Paddy Task Force.

== See also ==
- Van Vigyan Kendra (VVK) Forest Science Centres
- Krishi Vigyan Kendra
