= Indian Institute of Horticultural Research =

Research institute in Karataka, India

Indian Institute of Horticulture Research
- Other name: ICAR-IIHR
- Type: Constituent establishment under the ICAR/DARE
- Established: 1967; 59 years ago
- Affiliations: Indian Council of Agricultural Research
- Officer in charge: Prof. (Dr.) Tusar Kanti Behera
- Location: Bengaluru, Karnataka, India; 13.135°N 77.493°E
- Colors: Green
- Website: IIHR

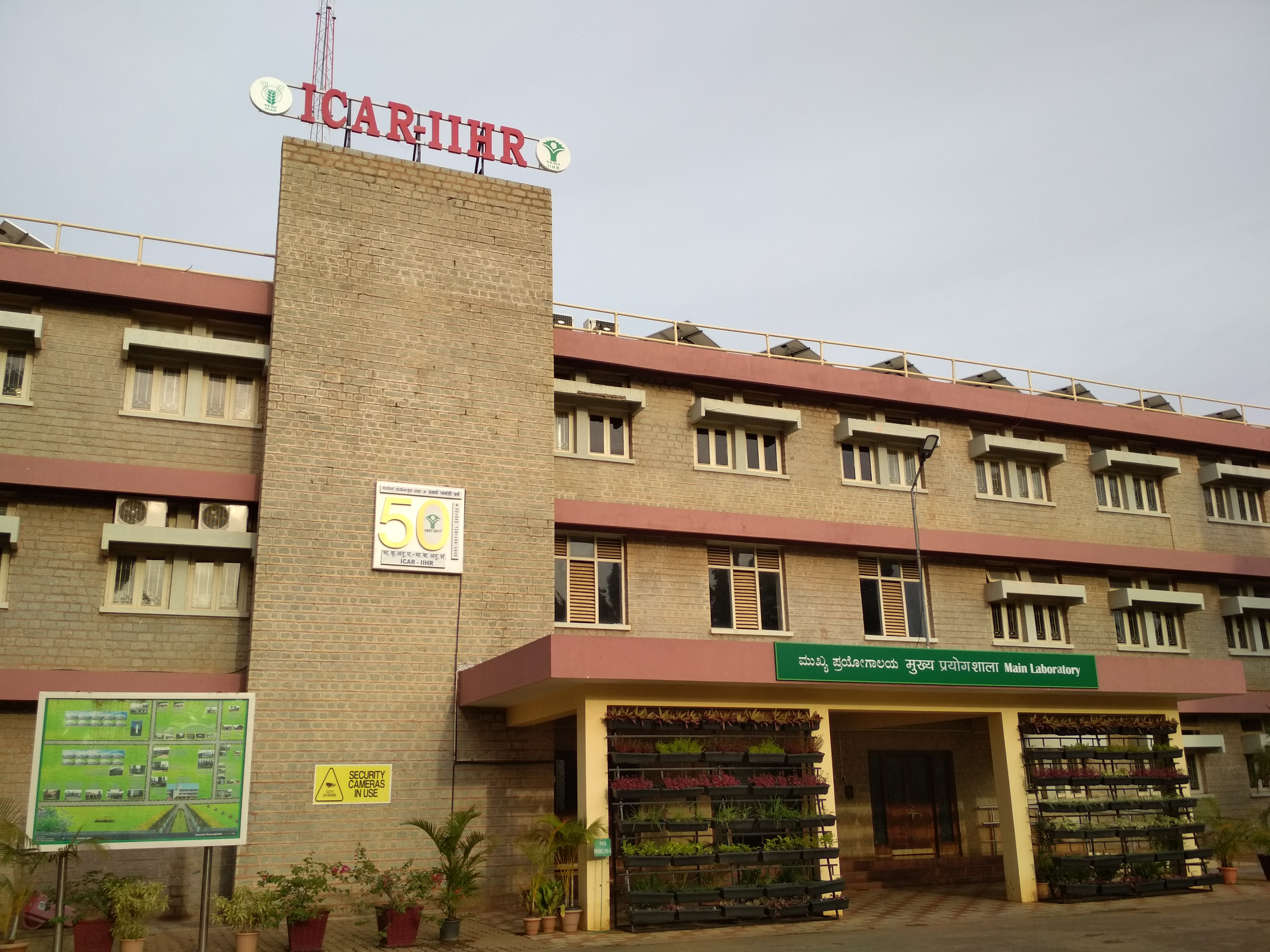
IIHR Main Building

The Indian Institute of Horticultural Research (IIHR) is an autonomous organization acting as a nodal agency for basic, strategic, anticipatory and applied research on various aspects of horticulture such as fruits, vegetable, ornamental, medicinal and aromatic plants and mushrooms in India. The institute has its headquarters in Bengaluru, Karnataka, India and is a subsidiary of Indian Council of Agricultural Research (ICAR), New Delhi, under the Ministry of Agriculture and Farmers' Welfare. It recently has been ranked 1st for the combined years 2019-20 and 2020–21 by the ICAR.

== History ==
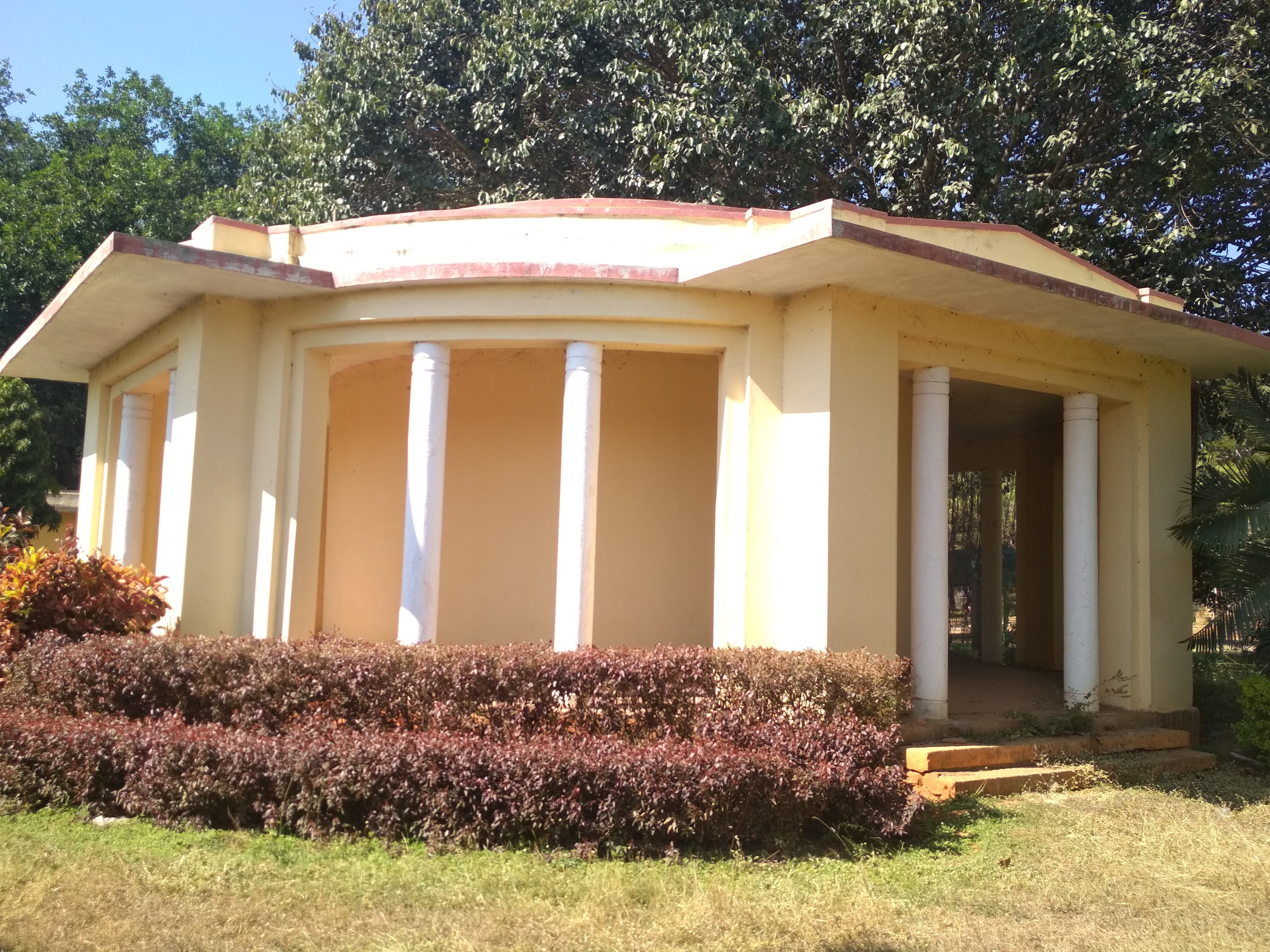
IIHR Water Tank

The IIHR, the first horticultural research institute in the country under the Indian Council of Agricultural Research (ICAR), was established on 5 September 1967 at New Delhi. Later, the base of IIHR was moved to Hesaraghatta located 25 km (16 mi) from Bangalore in Karnataka, on 1 February 1968, by merging the institute with National Horatorium of Govt. of Karnataka which was the premises of the Fruit Research Station, Hesaraghatta established in 1938 by HC Javaraya. The institute is spread over a land area of 263 hectares. Dr. Gurcharan Singh Randhawa was the first founding director of the institute from 1967 to 1980.

== Mandate ==
The institute is mandated to :

1. Undertake basic and applied research for developing strategies to enhance productivity and utilization of tropical and sub-tropical horticulture crops viz., fruits, vegetables, ornamentals, medicinal and aromatic plants and mushrooms.
2. Serve as a repository of scientific information relevant to horticulture.
3. Act as a centre for training for up gradation of scientific manpower in modern technologies for horticulture production.
4. Collaborate with national and international agencies in achieving the above objectives.

== Service profile - Agriculture Technology Information Center ==
The institute offers various services, consolidated under the umbrella of the Agriculture Technology Information Center (ATIC).

Farmers’ Advisory services : The service envisages identification of farmers' problems, analysis and advising suitable corrective measures.

Diagnostics : Diagnosis of diseases of various horticultural crops and advice on their control and management.

Supply of Video Films : Distribution of video films to the farmers and organizations for updating knowledge on modern technologies.

Supply of Publications : The institute has published many illustrated leaflets and bulletins for dissemination of crop information to the farmers. The publications are made in English, Hindi, Kannada, Tamil, Malayalam and Telugu.

Supply of Computer floppies and print outs : The institute has also made information available on floppy disks and as print-outs.

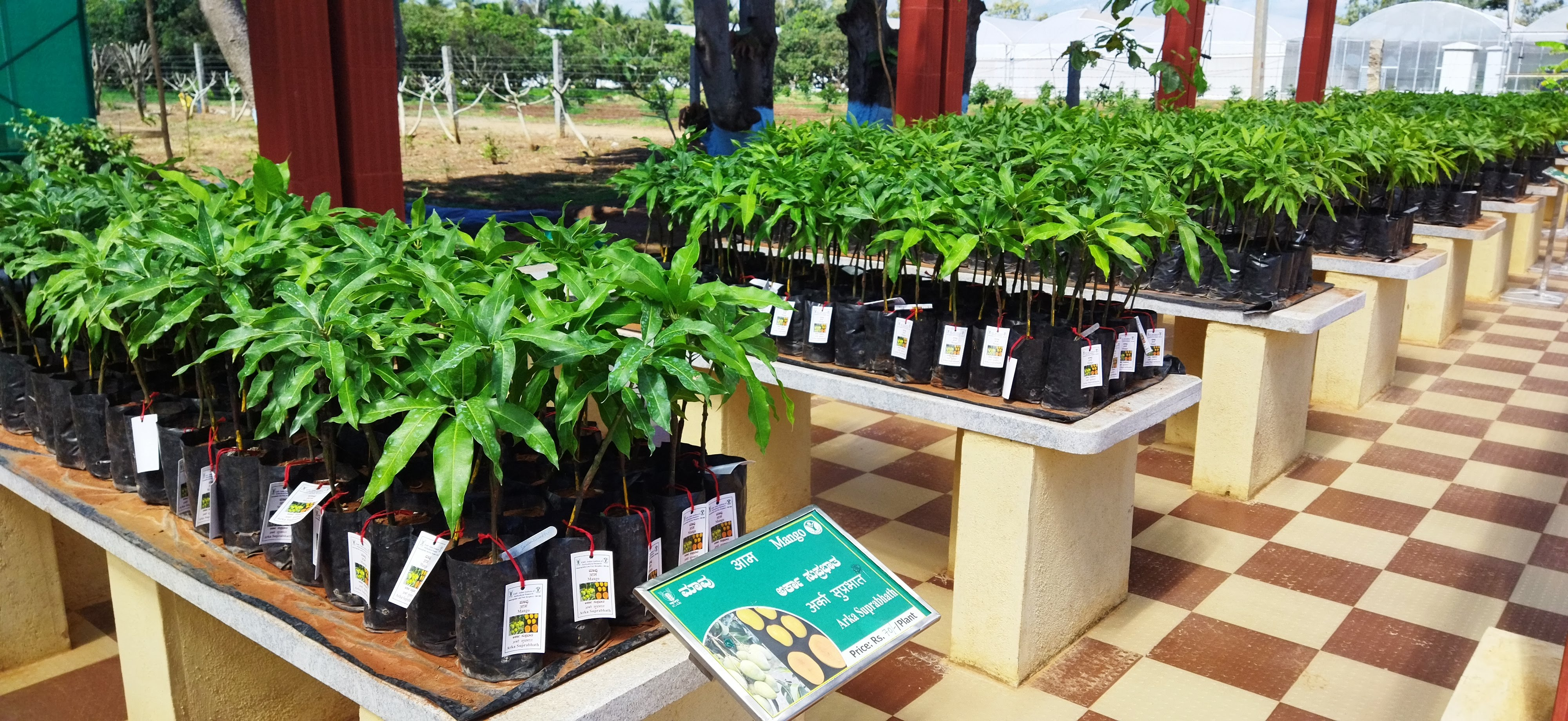
Nursery plants at display

Supply of seeds: Supply of seeds in packets are also undertaken by the institute.

== Divisions ==
=== Fruit Crops ===
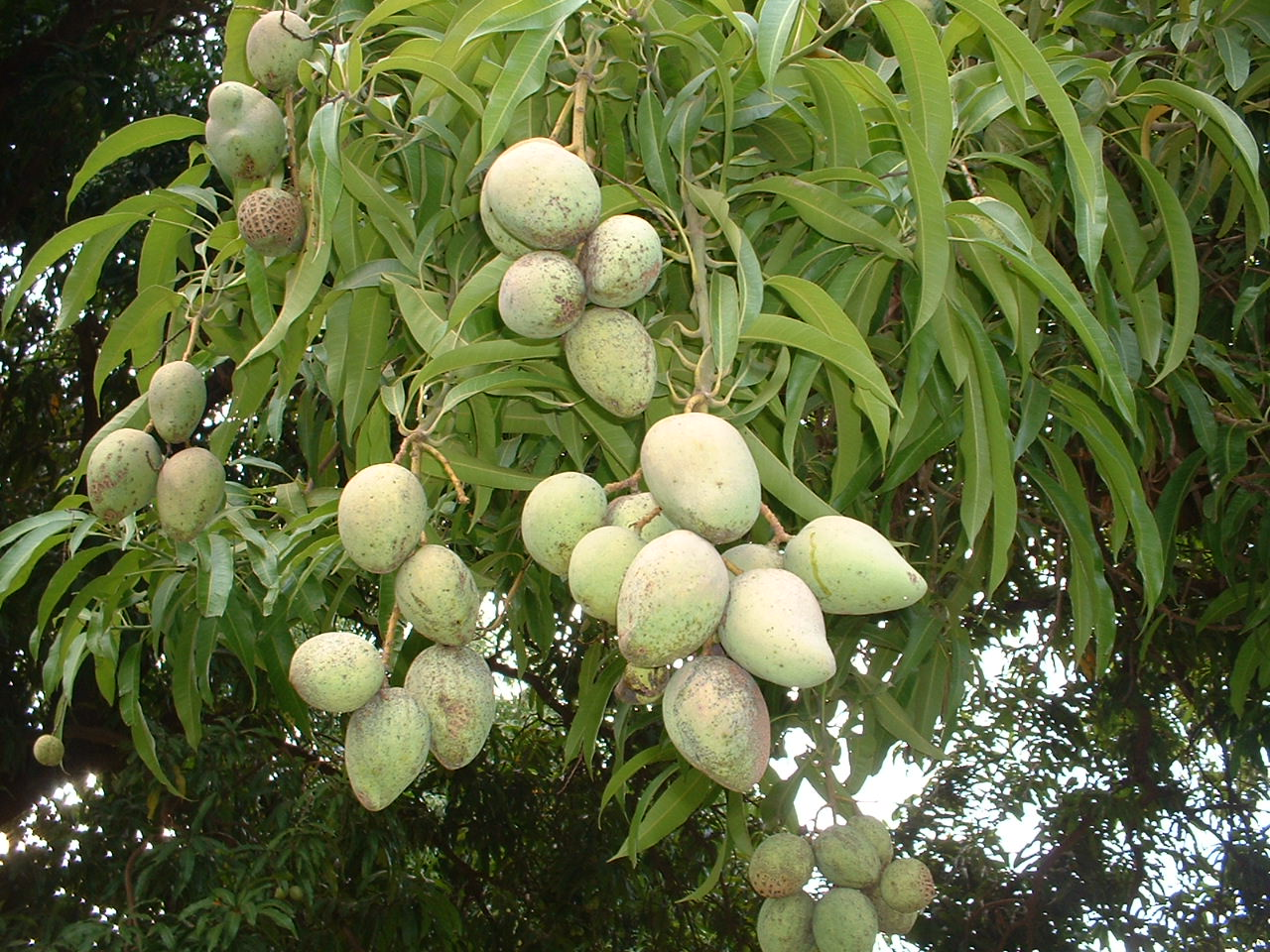
Mangoes

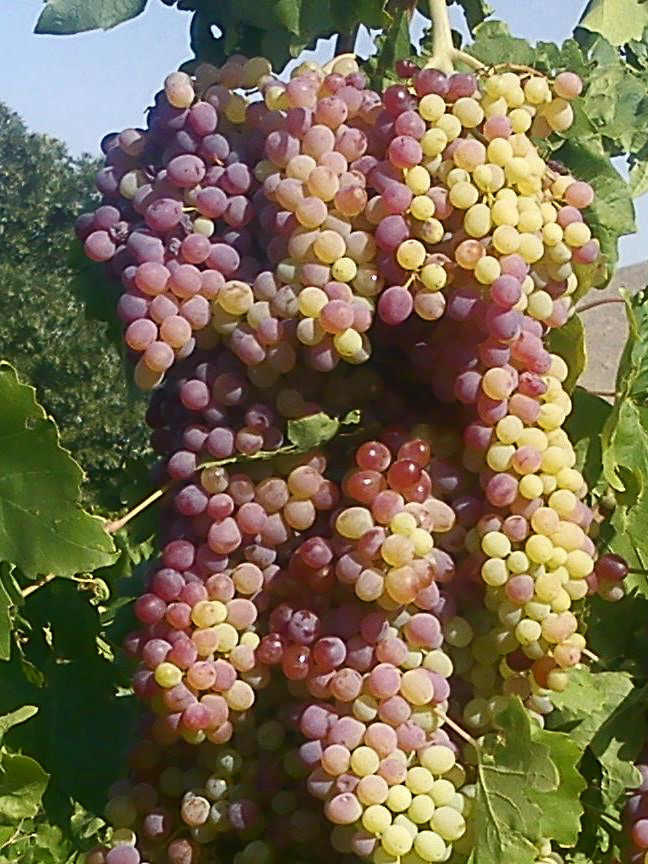
Grapes

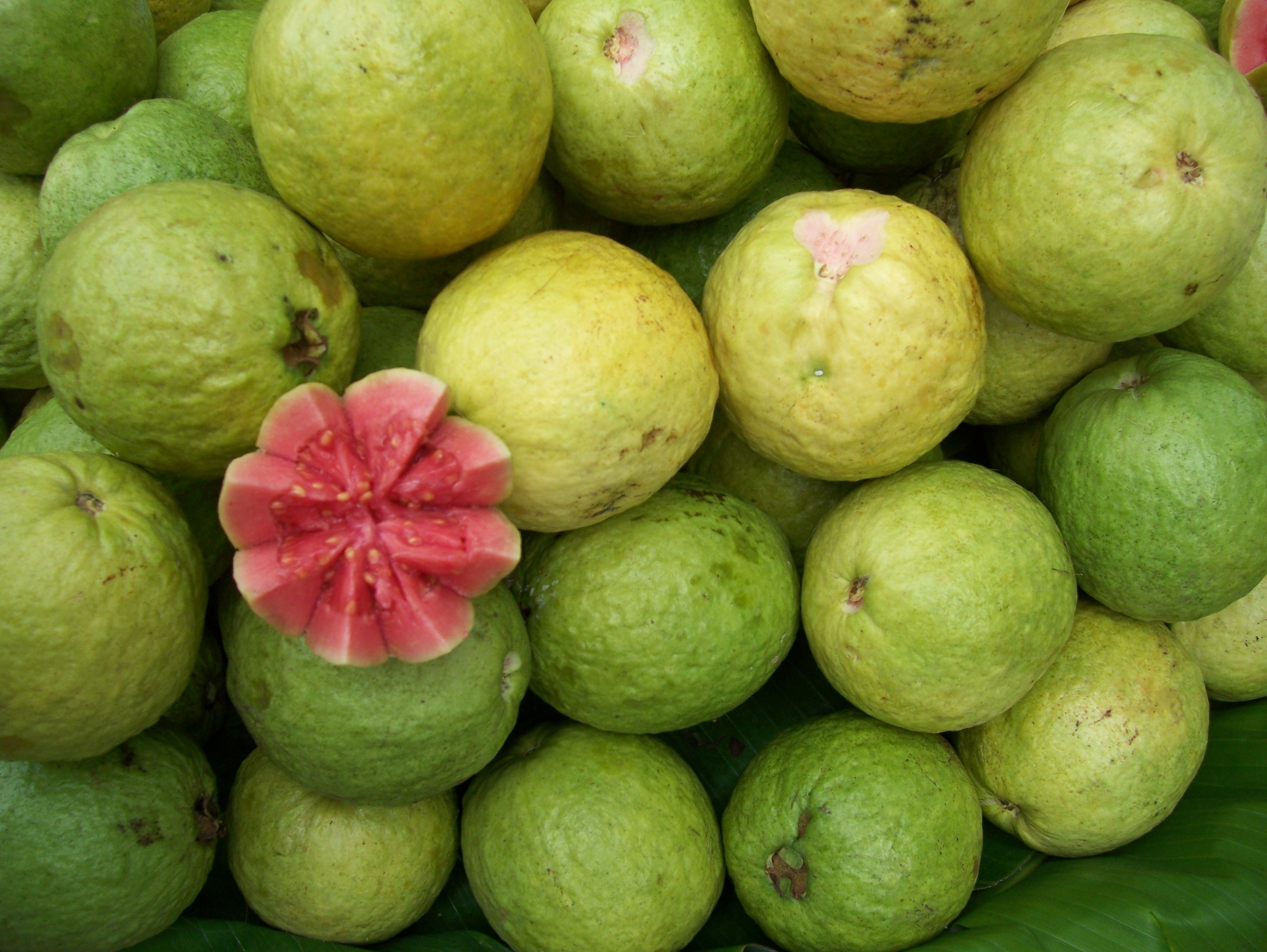
Apple guavas

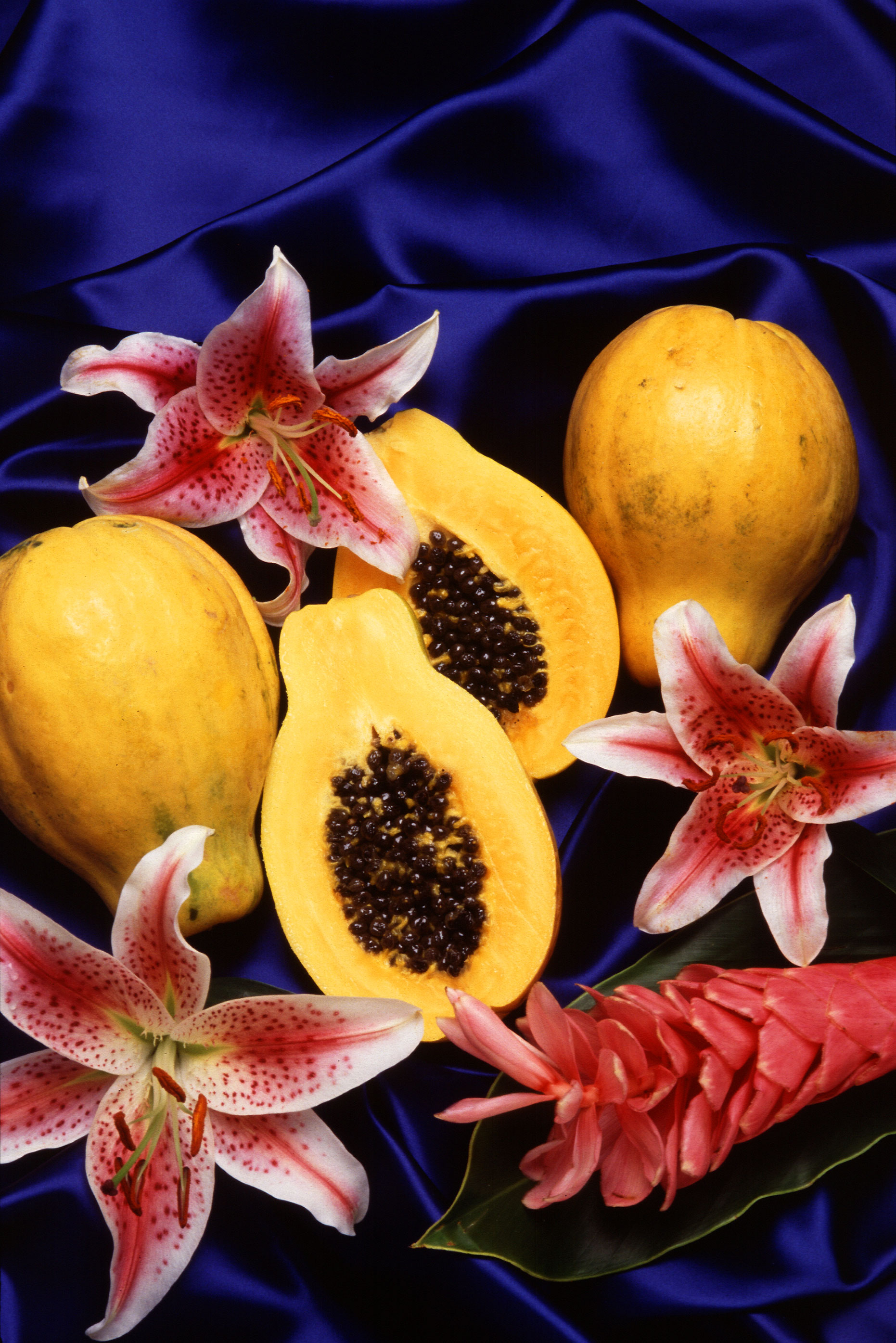
Papayas

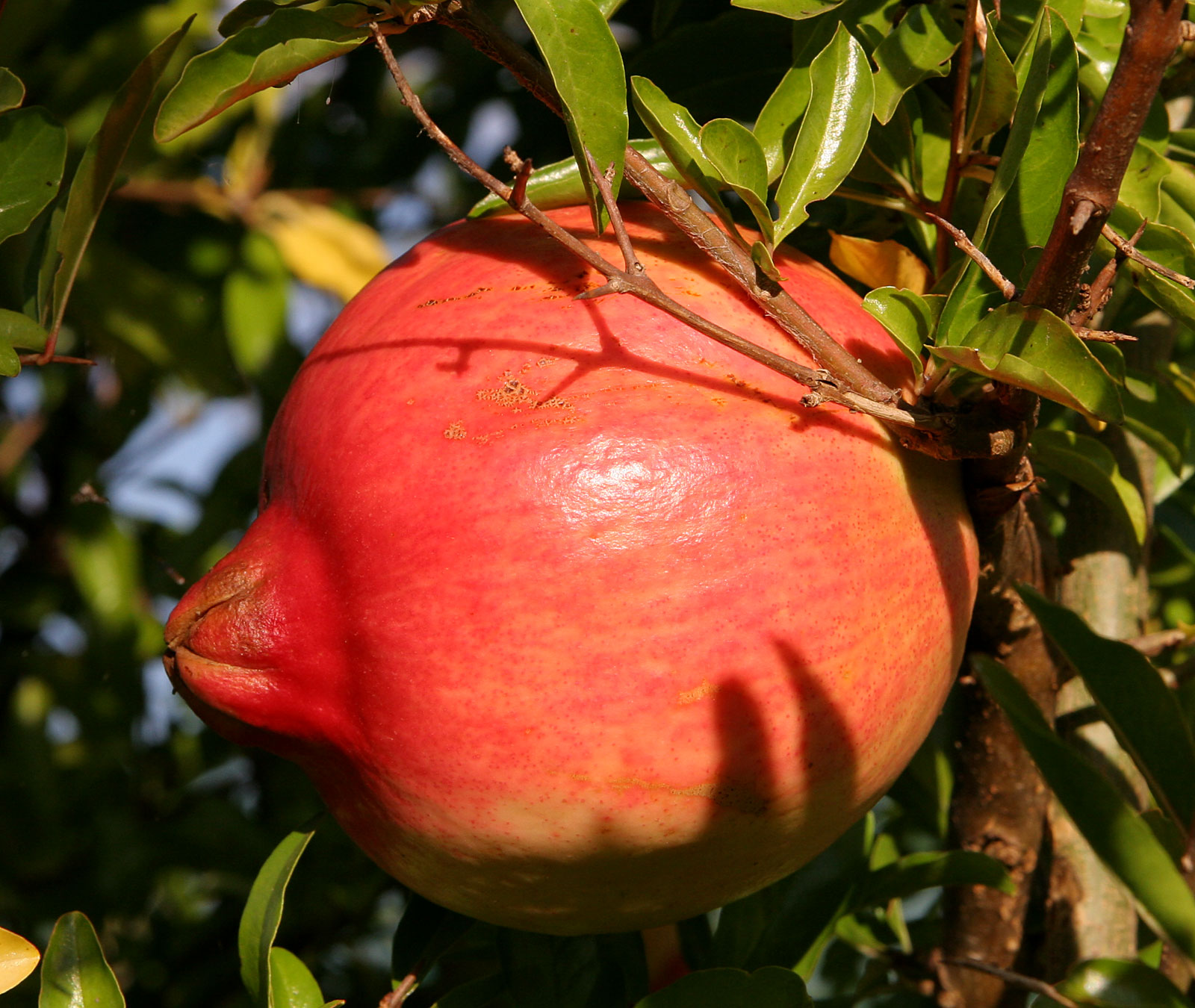
Pomegranate

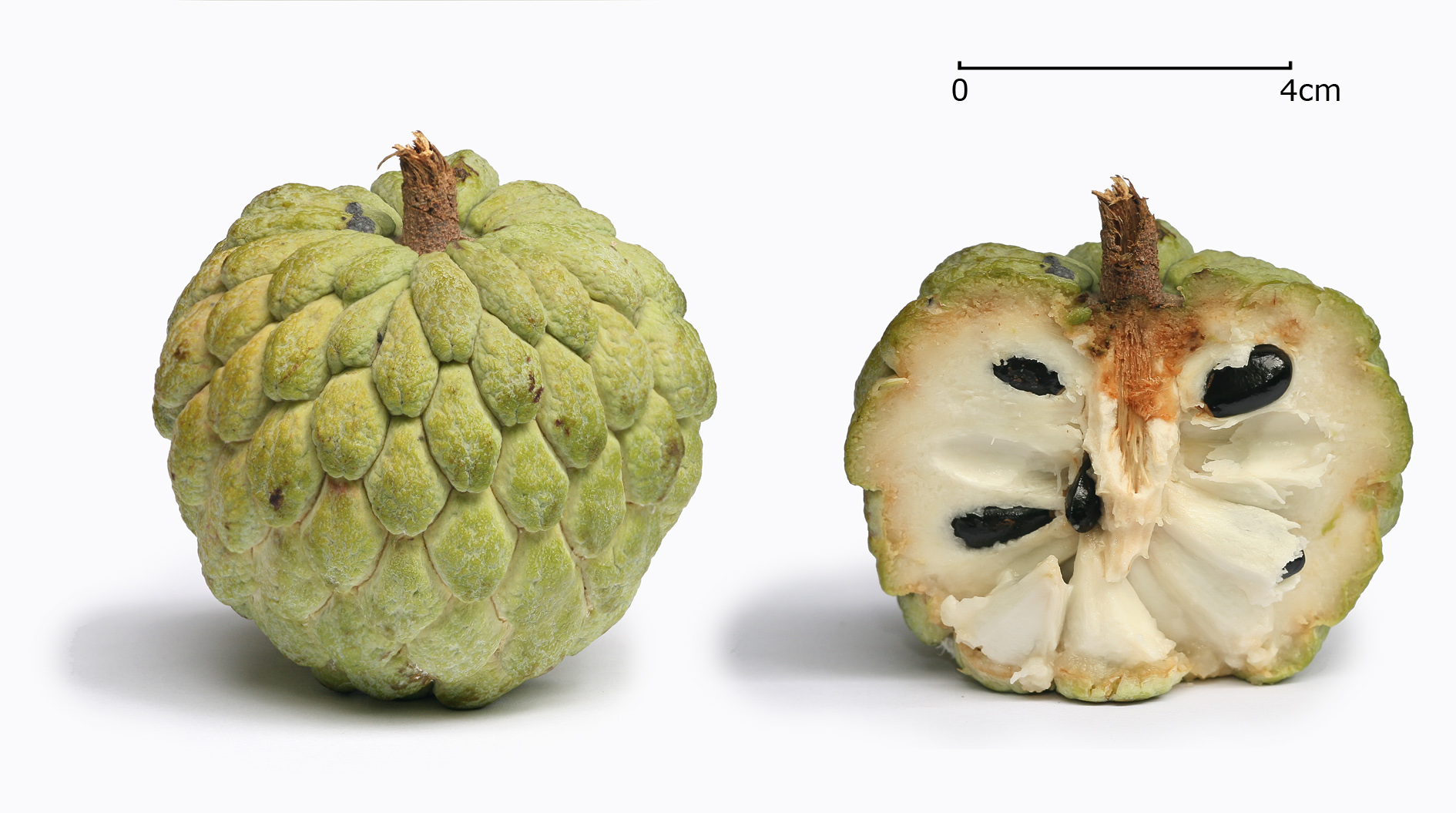
Annona

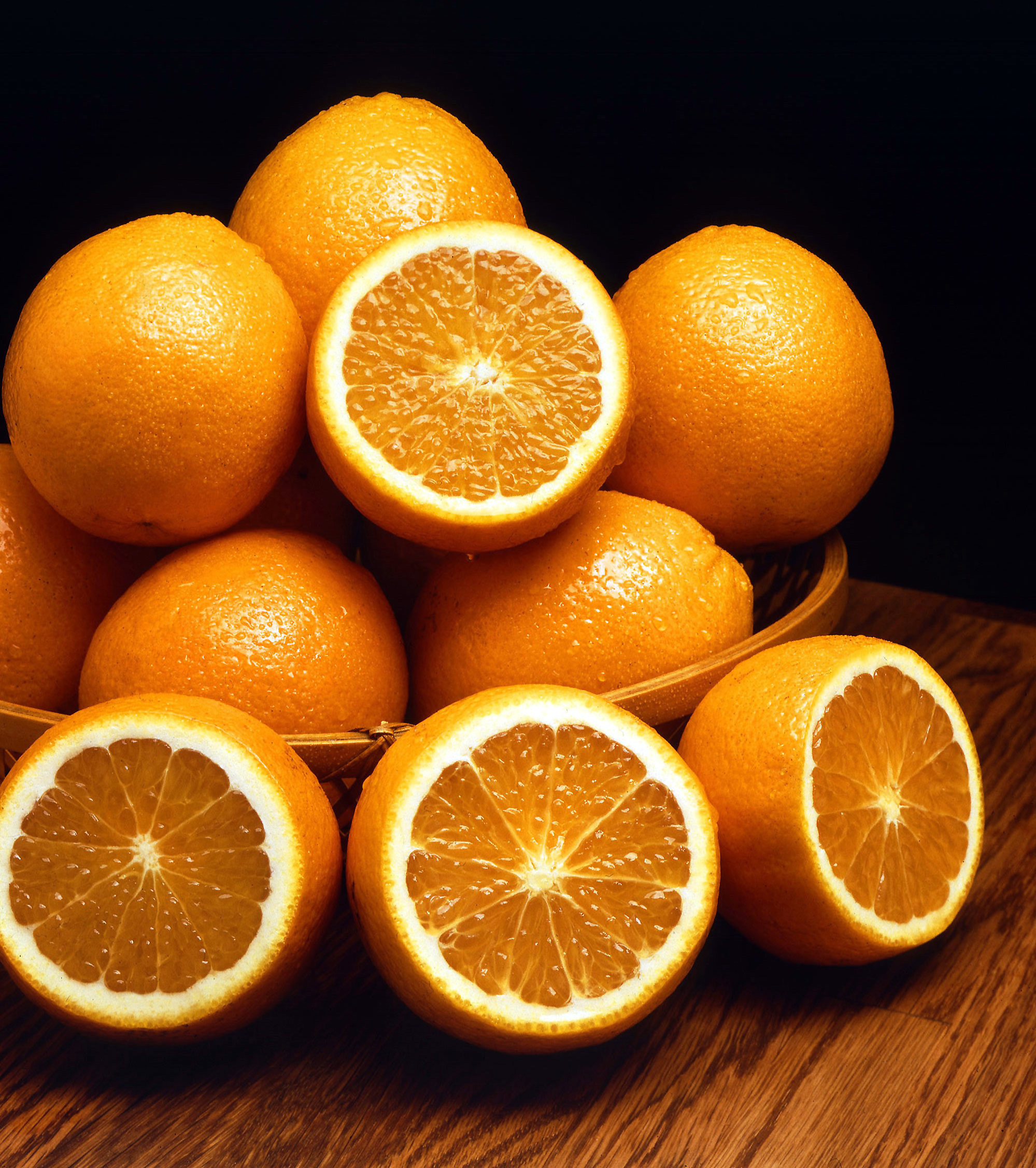
Sweet orange

The division deals with improvement of production technology of mango, grapes, pineapple, guava, papaya, pomegranate, ber, annona and citrus.

Mandate

- Carry out basic and strategic research, for enhancing productivity, quality and utility of fruit crops in tropical agro-climatic zones of India.
- Act as Repository of fruit genetic resources and their management.
- Transfer of technologies and study their impact.
- Conduct teaching and training programs for development of human resources.
- Use ICT in scientific information and knowledge.

=== Vegetable Crops ===
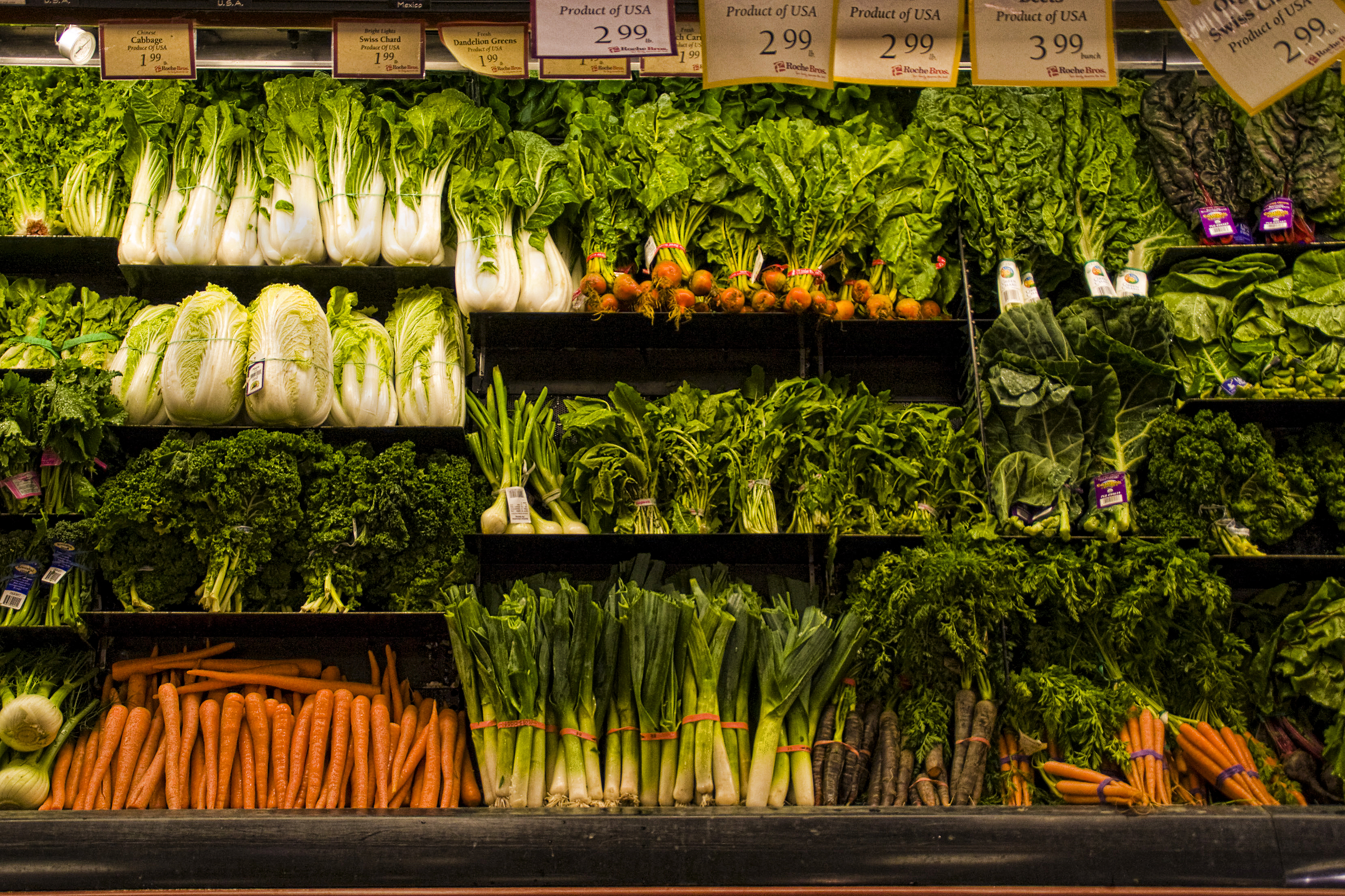
Vegetables

The vegetable Crops division carries out research, developing high yielding vegetable varieties / hybrids through crop improvement programmes with an emphasis on minimizing the cost. The division has five breeding laboratories and a production technology laboratory.

Mandate

- Breeding for high yield, resistance to biotic and abiotic stresses in vegetable crops
- Breeding for improved quality attributes like extended shelf life, processing and nutritional qualities
- Developing improved production technology, including organic farming in vegetable crops and off season vegetable production in open field and in poly house / protected cultivation.

=== Flower and Medicinal Crops ===
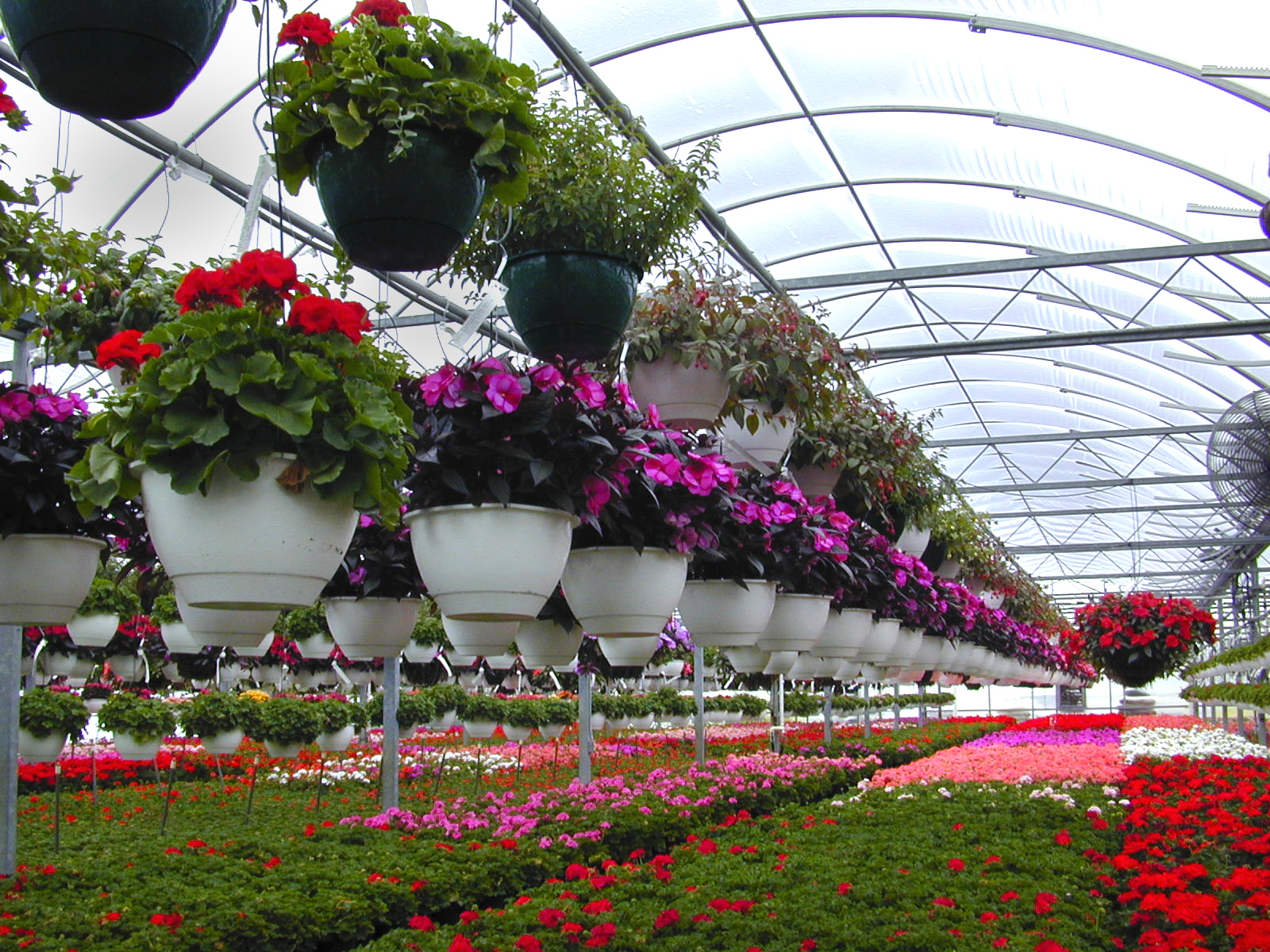
A floriculture greenhouse

The focus of the division is on development of new varieties of ornamental crops with a view to enhance export earning. The division also addresses issues like Protection of Plant Varieties and Farmers Rights.

Mandate

- Carrying out basic and strategic research, for enhancing productivity and quality of ornamental crops
- To act as a repository of genetic resources in ornamental crops
- To undertake front line demonstration in new technologies evolved and to impart training for upgrading scientific knowledge of technical personnel involved in floriculture enterprises

=== Crop Protection ===
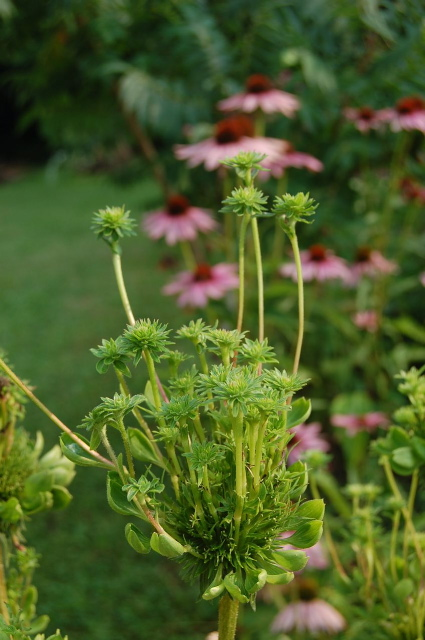
Phyllody induced by phytoplasma infection on a coneflower (Echinacea purpurea

The Plant Pathology division attends to basic and applied research for the management of diseases by microorganisms. Fully equipped laboratories are set up to combat the fungal, bacterial, viral, viroid and phytoplasma diseases of fruit crops, vegetable crops, ornamental and medicinal crops. The division also imparts training to agricultural extension officers and farmers.

Mandate

- Division of Plant Pathology will continue to maintain the vigil to meet emerging challenges due to rapid crop diversification, increased farming, increased germplasm movement and climate change, which are bringing changes to host-pathogen dynamics leading to emergence and reemergence of plant pathogens in horticultural Crops.
- Development of Diagnostics and to offer diagnostic services to SAUs, Farmers and Private seed and Tissue culture industries. Also to severe as a center for quarantine issues and phytosanitary certification.
- Continue to provide solutions and research leads to the plant disease problems in horticultural crops, understand disease epidemiology and develop durable disease management strategies.
- Develop rapid screening methods for identification of resistance sources and to use in breeding for disease resistance.
- Continue our collaboration with international and national institutions for data on the distribution of plant diseases and the emergence of new diseases, essential to develop and/or modify existing methods of diagnosis for effective disease management strategies.
- To provide training and services to farmers, extension agents, researchers in NARS and students to strengthen the human resource development specially for disease management in horticultural crops.
- Agro/ lignocellulosic waste management through the production of edible and medicinal mushrooms.
- Utilization of mushrooms for malnutrition management through the production of mushroom nutraceuticals.
- Enhancing input efficiency of energy, water and manpower in mushroom production processes through mechanization.
- Documentation and conservation of the indigenous macrofungi wealth of the country
- Making mushroom production enterprise zero waste enterprise through the utilization of mushroom cultivation process wastes for various beneficial purposes
- To provide support through training and quality spawn to entrepreneurs, institutions, NGOs, State departments and KVKs.
- To carry out basic and strategic research for the management of pests of Horticultural crops (vegetables, fruits, ornamental, medicinal and aromatic crops).
- To Develop Integrated Pest Management packages and Integrated Nematode Management packages by emphasizing ecofriendly pest management.
- To conduct teaching and training programs for development of human resources in pest management.
- To develop innovative products and commercialize the same through ITMU and public and private partnership (PPP).

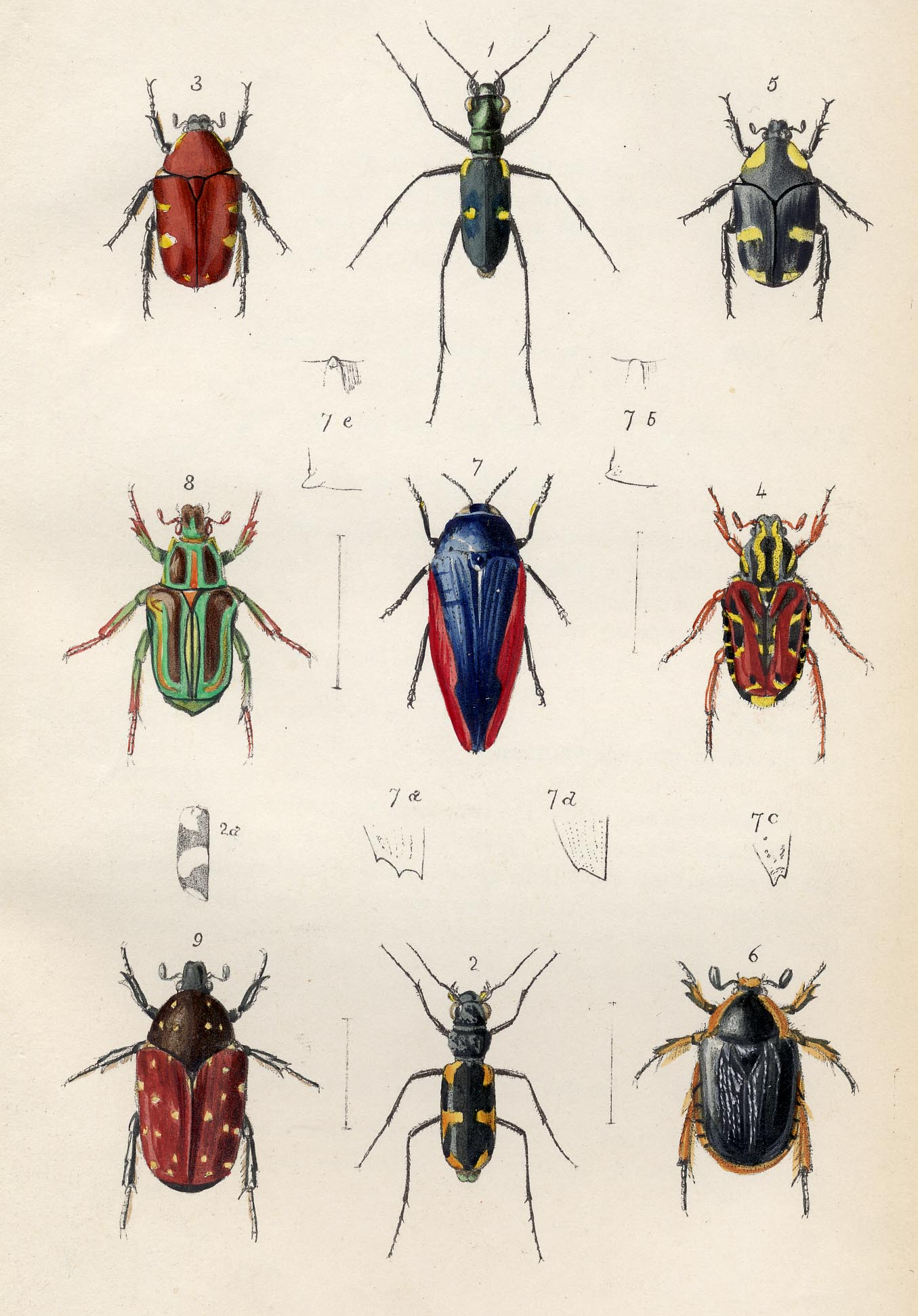
Insects and Pest

=== Basic Sciences ===
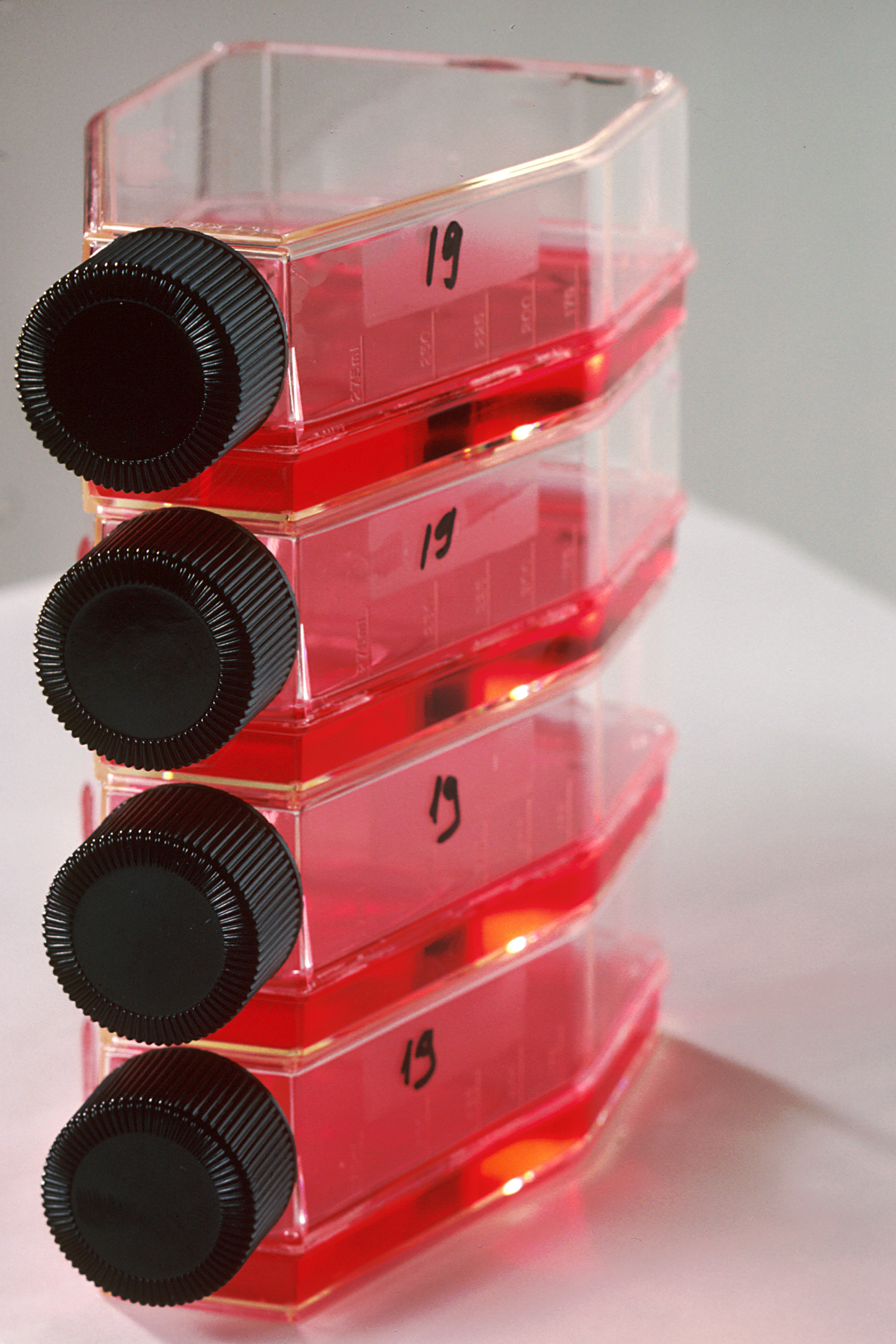
Tissue culture vials

The Division of Plant Physiology and Biochemistry is the arm of IIHR that deal with tissue culture, molecular biology, pesticide residue and food microbiology.

Mandate

- To undertake basic and applied research on physiological and biochemical aspects of horticultural crops with particular reference to physiology of growth, development, yield and quality.
- To assess the impact of climate change on crop productivity and quality.

=== Natural Resources ===
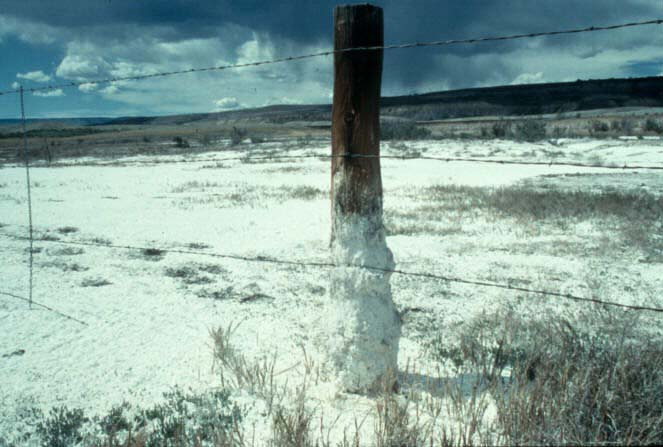
Salt-affected soil

The division studies the nutrient requirement of horticultural crops and to develop suitable agro techniques for vegetable crops. It houses many laboratories viz., Soil Chemistry, Soil Salinity, Micronutrient, Leaf Analysis, Isotope, Water Management, Soil Microbiology, Microbiology and Pesticide Residue Laboratories.

Mandate

- Carry out research on the nutrient requirement and management of different horticultural crops and to develop suitable INM packages for enhancing productivity.
- Carry out the basic and strategic research to sustain soil health in horticultural ecosystems.
- Development of leaf nutrient diagnostic norms and precision farming protocols for need based nutrient management.
- Utilization of microbes for improvement of crop production and residue management
- Pesticide residue management in horticultural crops and related environment.
- Teaching, training and extension of services for students and farming community.

=== Social Sciences and Training ===
E and T division operated as an Advanced Training Center of the Directorate of Extension, Government of India (1997–2003) and was the Trainers Training Center of the Indian Council and Agricultural Research from 1976 to 1997. It looks after the training and extension activities of IIHR.

Mandate

- To disseminate improved horticultural technologies through use of different extension methodologies.
- To provide training to the farmers and horticultural officials in improved horticultural technologies.
- To undertake research on socio-economic issues of horticultural farmers.
- To conduct studies on gender mainstreaming in horticulture.

=== Post Harvest Technology and Agricultural Engineering ===
The division started as the Division of Fruit and Vegetable Processing, Microbiology and Postharvest Technology in 1978 which was later renamed as the Division of Postharvest Technology. The research work in the division focusses on handling and storage, processing, microbiology and cut flowers.

Objectives

- To carry out basic and applied research on postharvest management and extension of self-life of fruits, vegetables, and ornamental crops.
- To develop technologies/processes for value addition, product diversification and waste utilization of fruits, vegetables, and ornamental crops.
- To carry out research to ensure microbiological quality and safety in fresh and processed products.
- To conduct teaching and training for capacity building of scientific manpower and for development of human resources as well as to serve as repository of scientific information in the areas of postharvest horticulture.
- To develop innovative products/processes and commercialize the same through ITMU and Public and Private Partnership (PPP).

== Sections ==
Biotechnology The Division of Biotechnology is now merged with the Division of Basic Sciences, which focusses on research on Gene discovery, regeneration and transgenics, Molecular markers, Marker Assisted Selection, Functional Genomics, Bioinformatics and Endophytic molecular microbiology. Specific areas of work include:

- development of molecular markers for okra and markers for root-stock identification in citrus
- development of BT transgenic brinjal and tomato
- cloning of genes for fungal resistance and transgenic development
- development of embryogenic suspension of banana and GM banana for Fusarium wilt resistance
- development of GM tomato, papaya and watermelon for virus resistance
- development of GM tomato, papaya & watermelon for virus resistance
- elucidation of ubiquitous association of endophytic microorganisms in vivo and in vitro
- discovery of periplasmic bacteria in banana

Plant Genetic Resources

The division is involved in exploration, introduction, exchange, evaluation, characterization and conservation of horticultural plant growth regulators. IIHR claims to have introduced 22,080 accessions in fruits, vegetables, ornamentals & Medicinal and Aromatic Plant species. It also works on enrichment of germplasm from wild sources through exploration missions.

A Pollen Cryobank was established under the division for long term cryogenic preservation of crops which was featured in the Limca Book of Records in 2001. A Field Gene Bank (FGB) also works under the division and the division supports establishment FGBs for Mango, Guava and Jackfruit crops.

Mandate

- To act as a regional center for acquisition and management of indigenous and exotic horticultural plant genetic resources (PGR).
- To carry out related research and human resource development for sustainable growth of horticulture in the country.

Seed Science and Technology: to conduct research on seed production and quality aspects of horticultural crops with a mandate:

- Seed Production
- Seed Quality Testing and Storage
- Seed Protection
- Seed Physiology

Agricultural Engineering: to develop and maintain IIHR farm and to establish workshop for research and development in Farm Machinery with a mandate to:

- Development of cultivation and processing machinery for horticultural crops.
- Development cultivation machinery for horticultural crops inside greenhouses.
- Development suitable greenhouses for cultivation of horticultural crops.
- Imparting knowledge and training to the scientists, farmers, students and stake holders for use of horticultural machinery.

Medicinal Crops: to undertake research work is on the genetic improvement of commercially important medicinal and aromatic crops and standardization of agro-technology. It holds the mandate to:

- Enrichment, documentation and Conservation of diversity in medicinal Crops.
- Genetic amelioration for yield and quality.
- Organic production technologies.
- Photochemical analysis

Economics and Statistics: undertakes research work on economic aspects and statistical models. The section is associated in collaborative or co-investigative research at the institute level as well as in external projects. It is also involved in the post graduate collaboration in education and research with University of Agricultural Sciences, Bangalore, Dr. Y.S.R. Horticultural University, and University of Horticultural Sciences, Bagalkot. The section has a mandate :

- To undertake socio-economic research in horticultural crops. viz., economics of production, marketing and trade.
- To develop statistical models for horticultural crop research and computer application in horticultural crops.

== Regional stations ==
=== Central Horticultural Experiment Stations (CHES) ===
IIHR operates three CHESs under its wing.

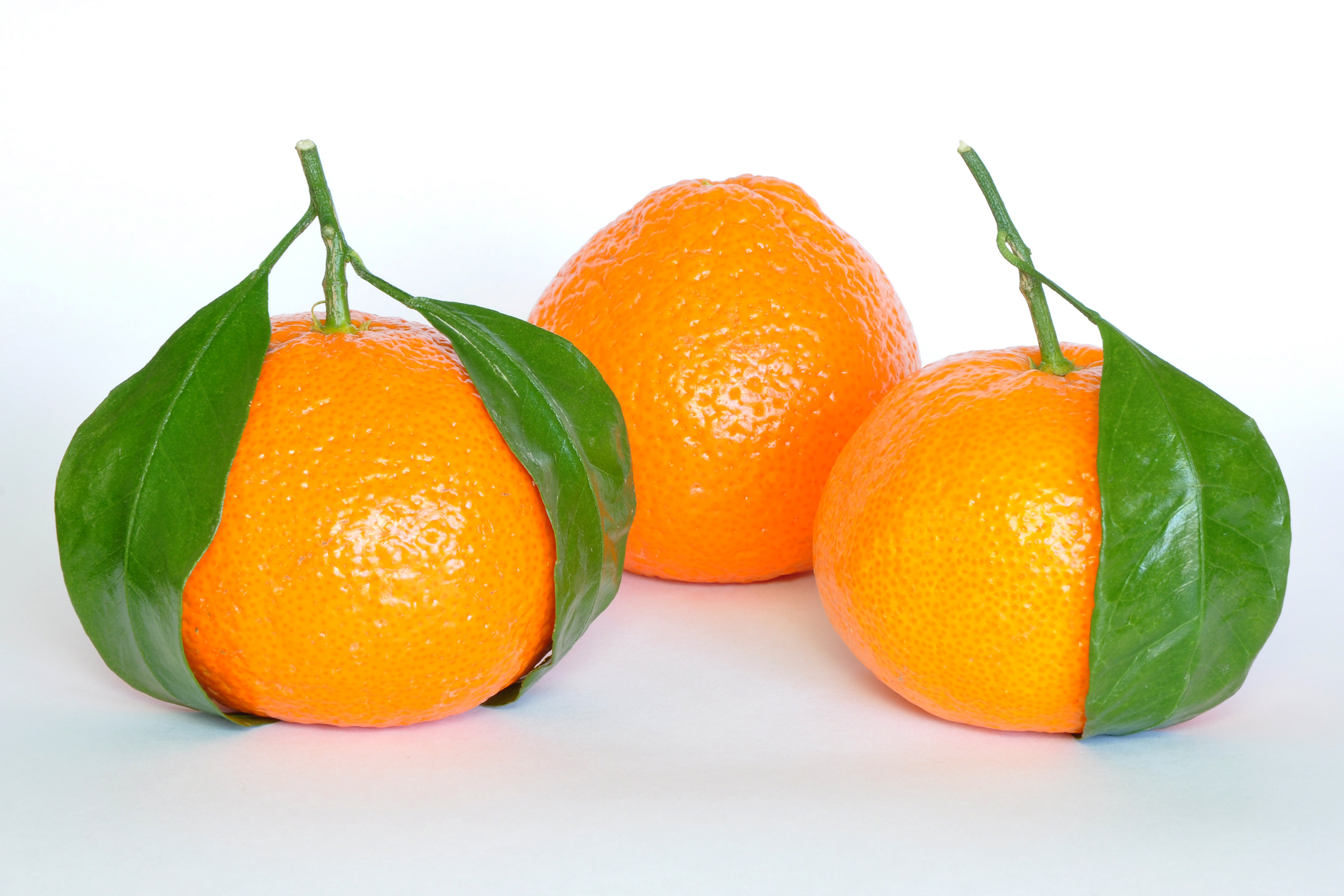

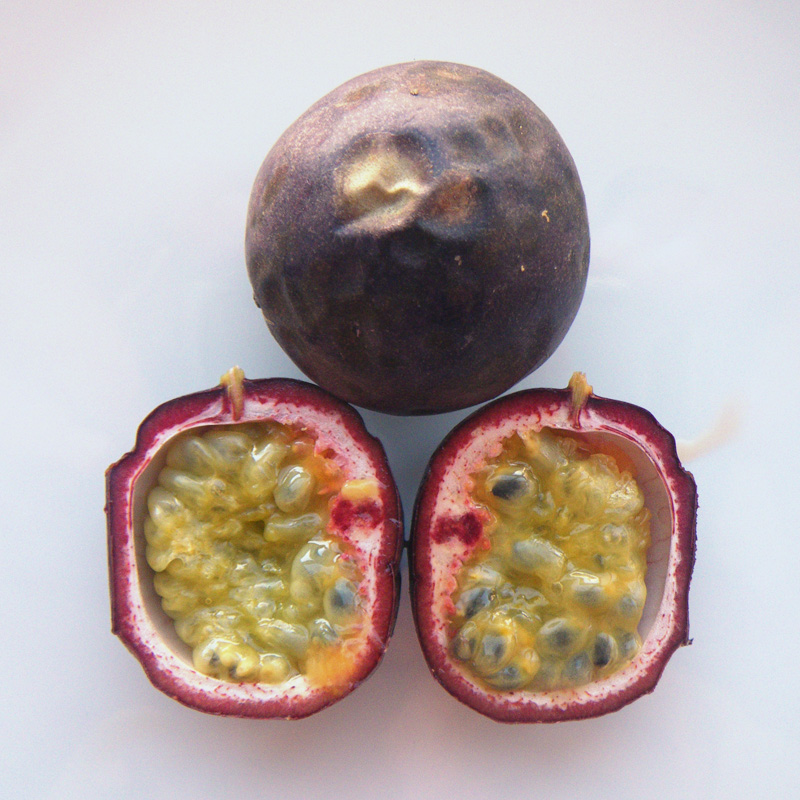

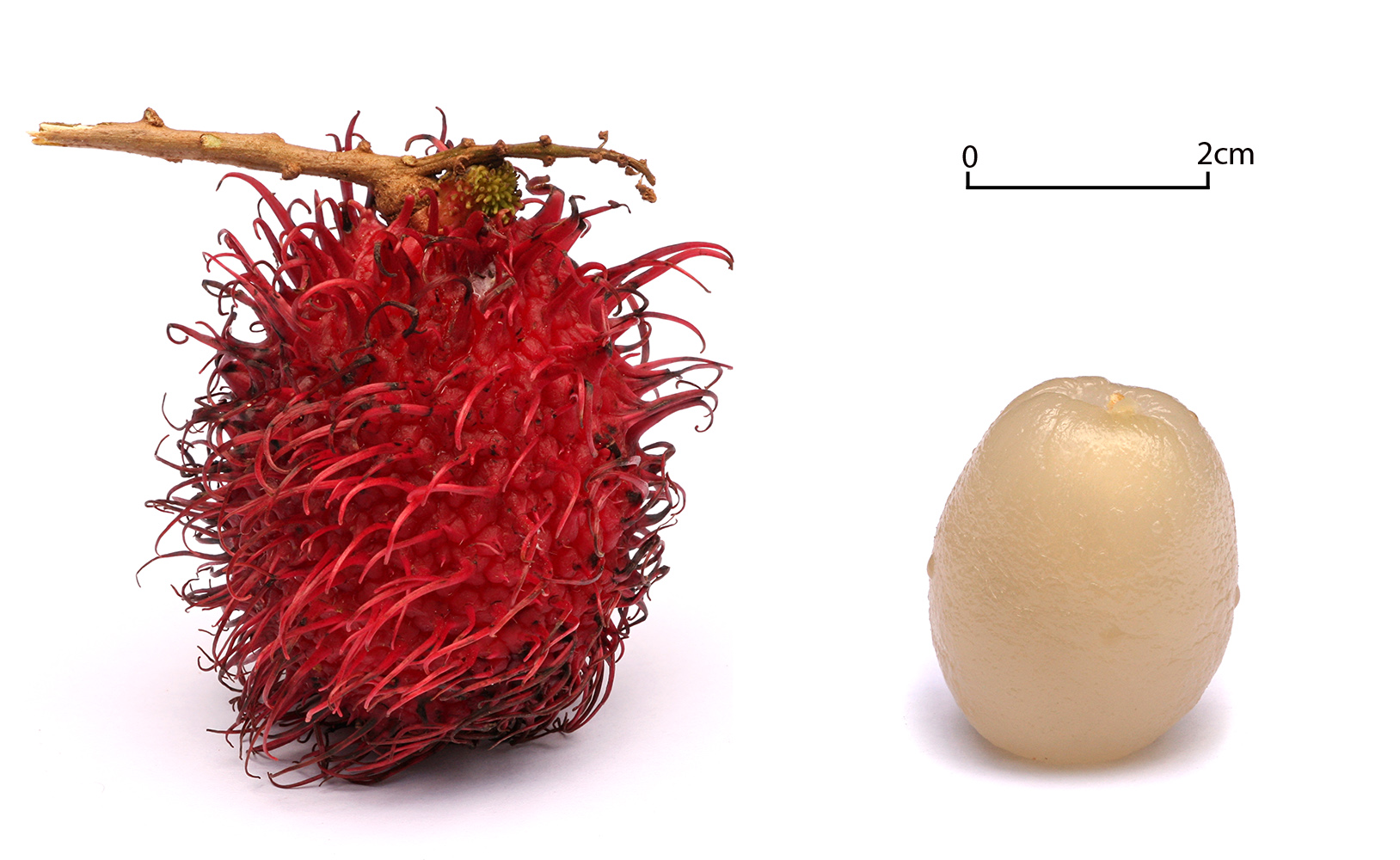

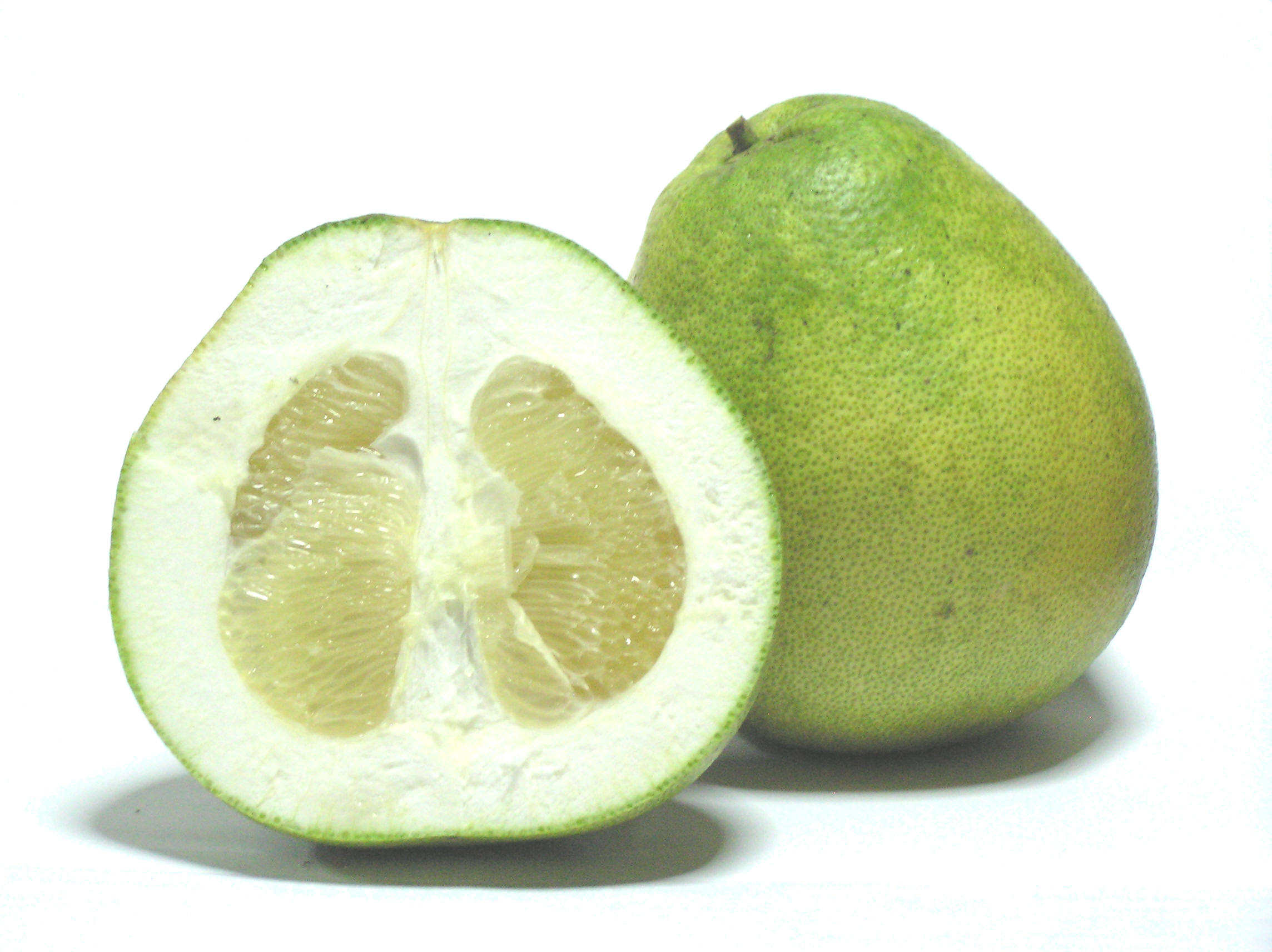

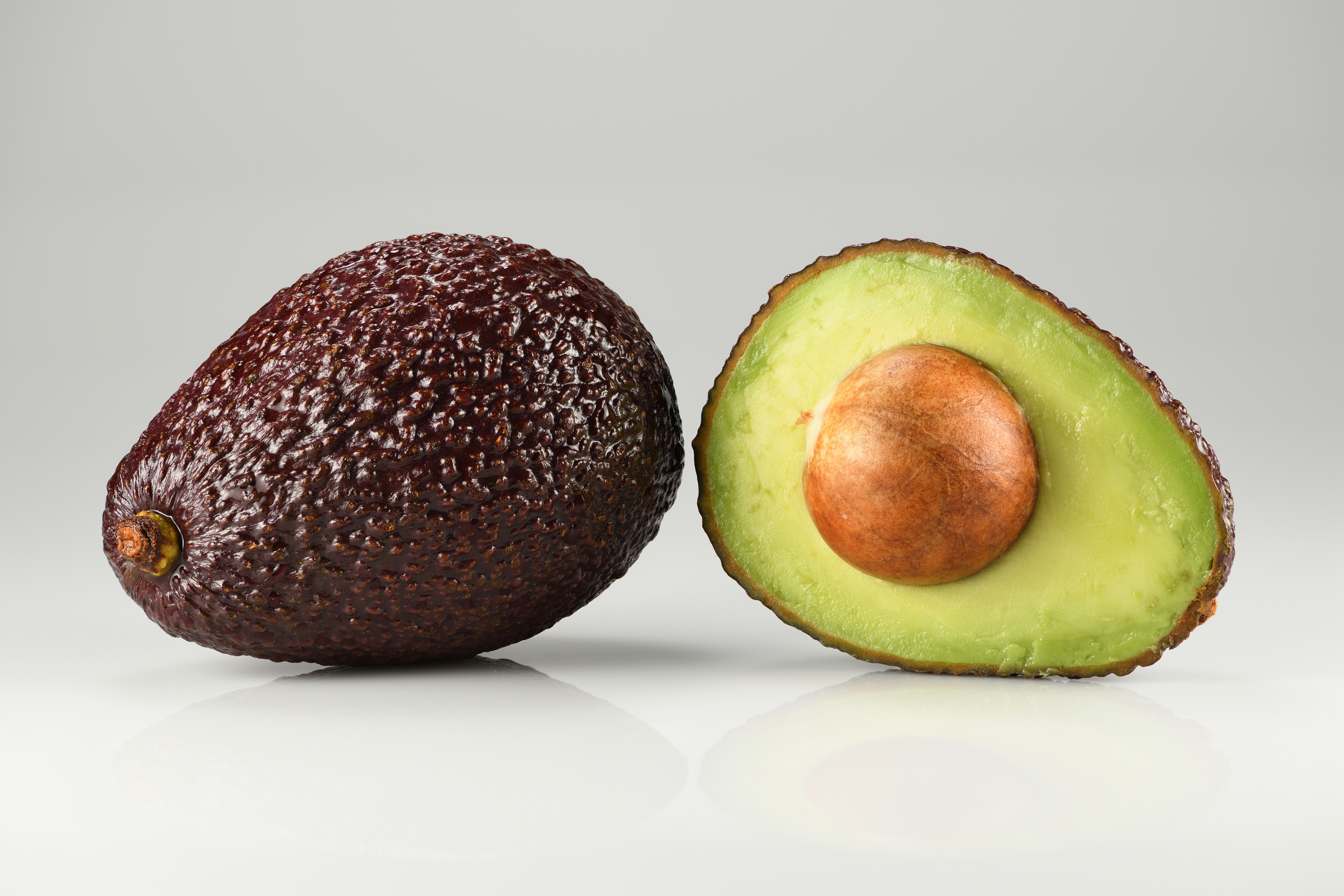

CHES Chettalli: The station works on the mandate crop of mandarin out of an area of 92 hectares in Coorg. The other crops of interest are papaya and passion fruit and minor fruits like rambutan, pummelo, avocado, mangosteen, karonda, Malayan apple and Garcinia. The station is also involved in the floricultural of rose, asters, gladiolus and orchids.

CHES Bhubaneshwar is located at Bhubaneswar, Odisha and conducts research on applied and strategic aspects of horticultural crops. It also develops sustainable technologies suitable for the farmers of eastern region of the country in general and the state of Odisha in particular.

CHES Hirehalli is located at Hirehalli, near Tumkur in Karanataka.

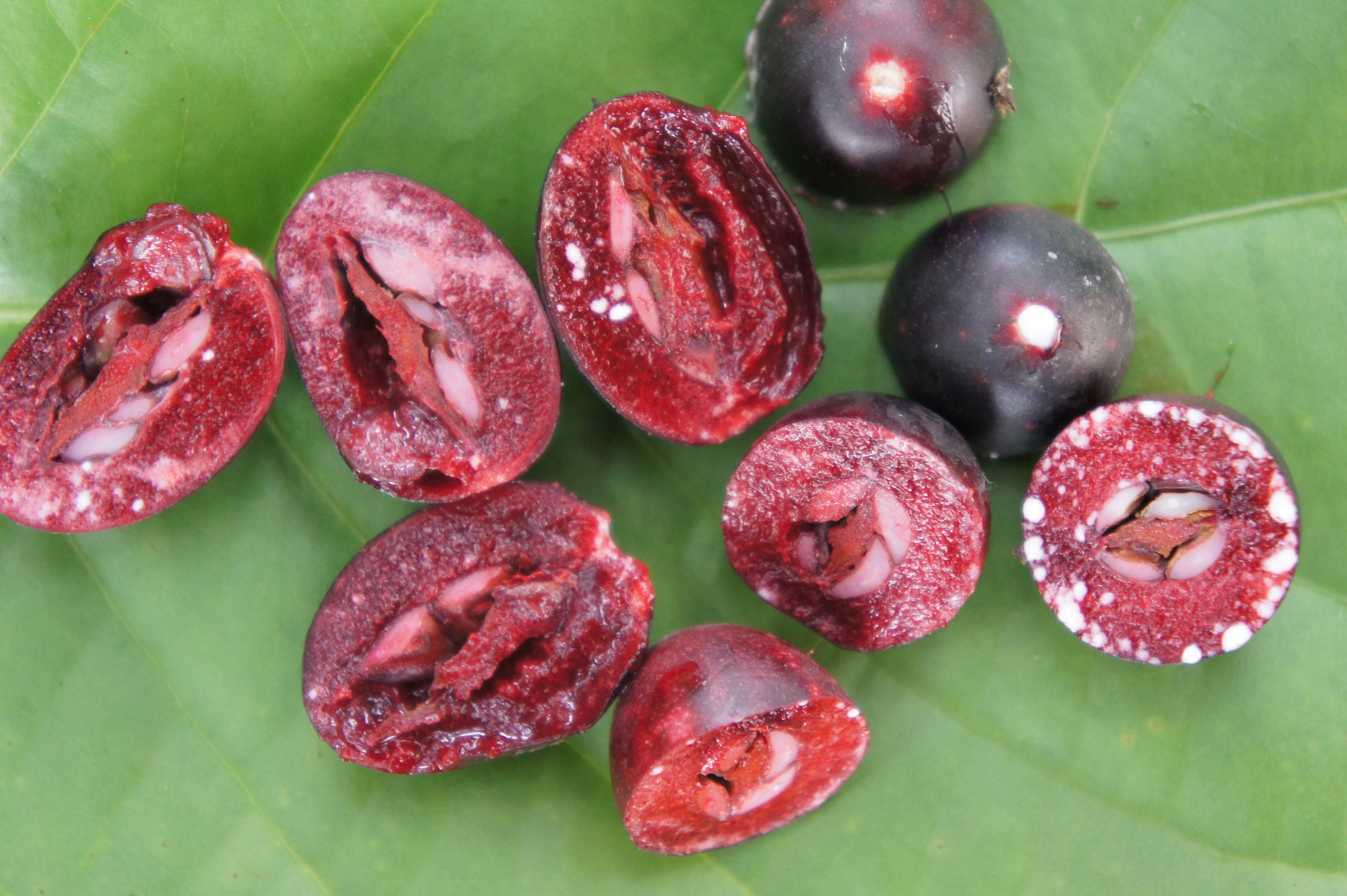

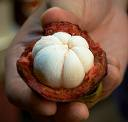

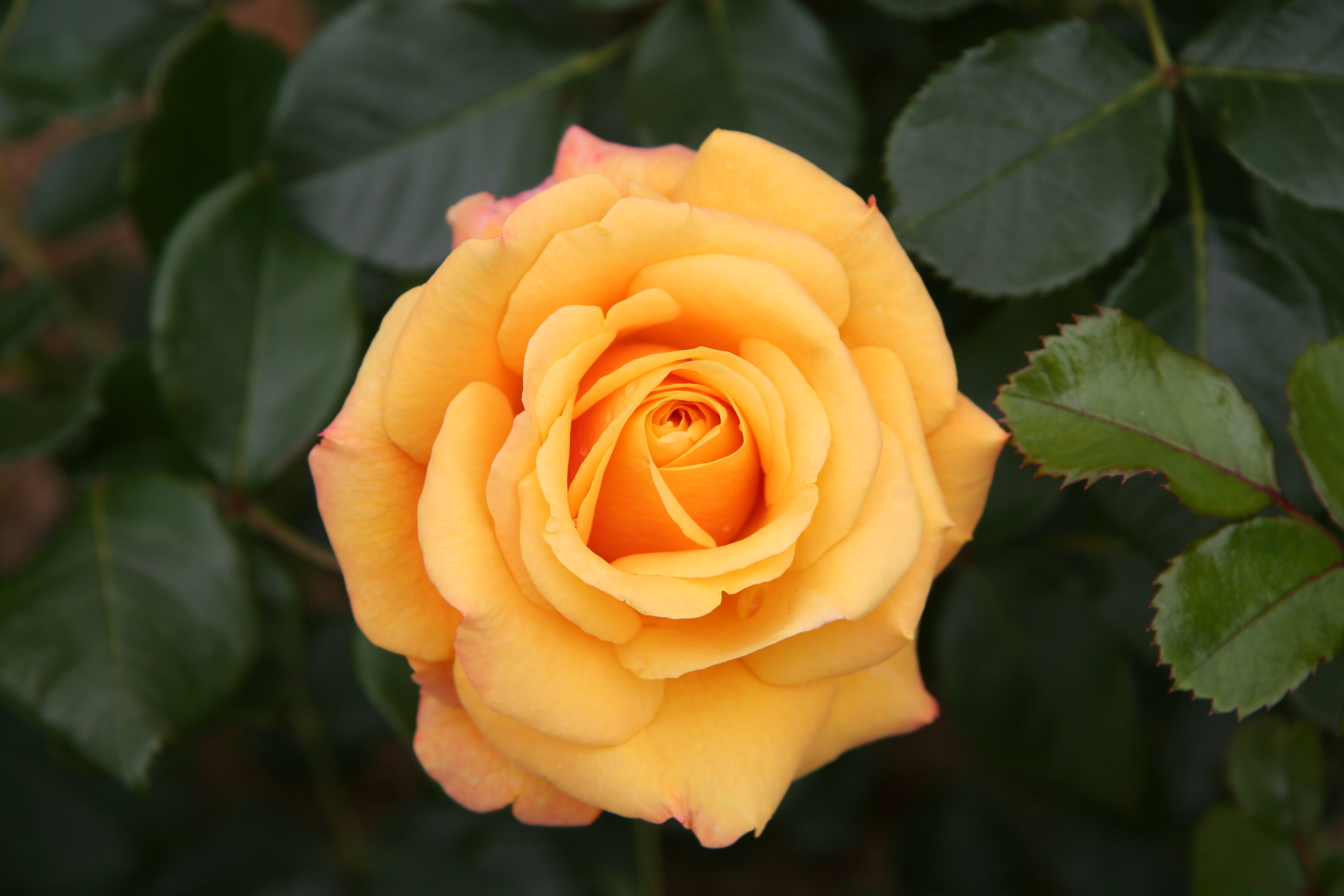

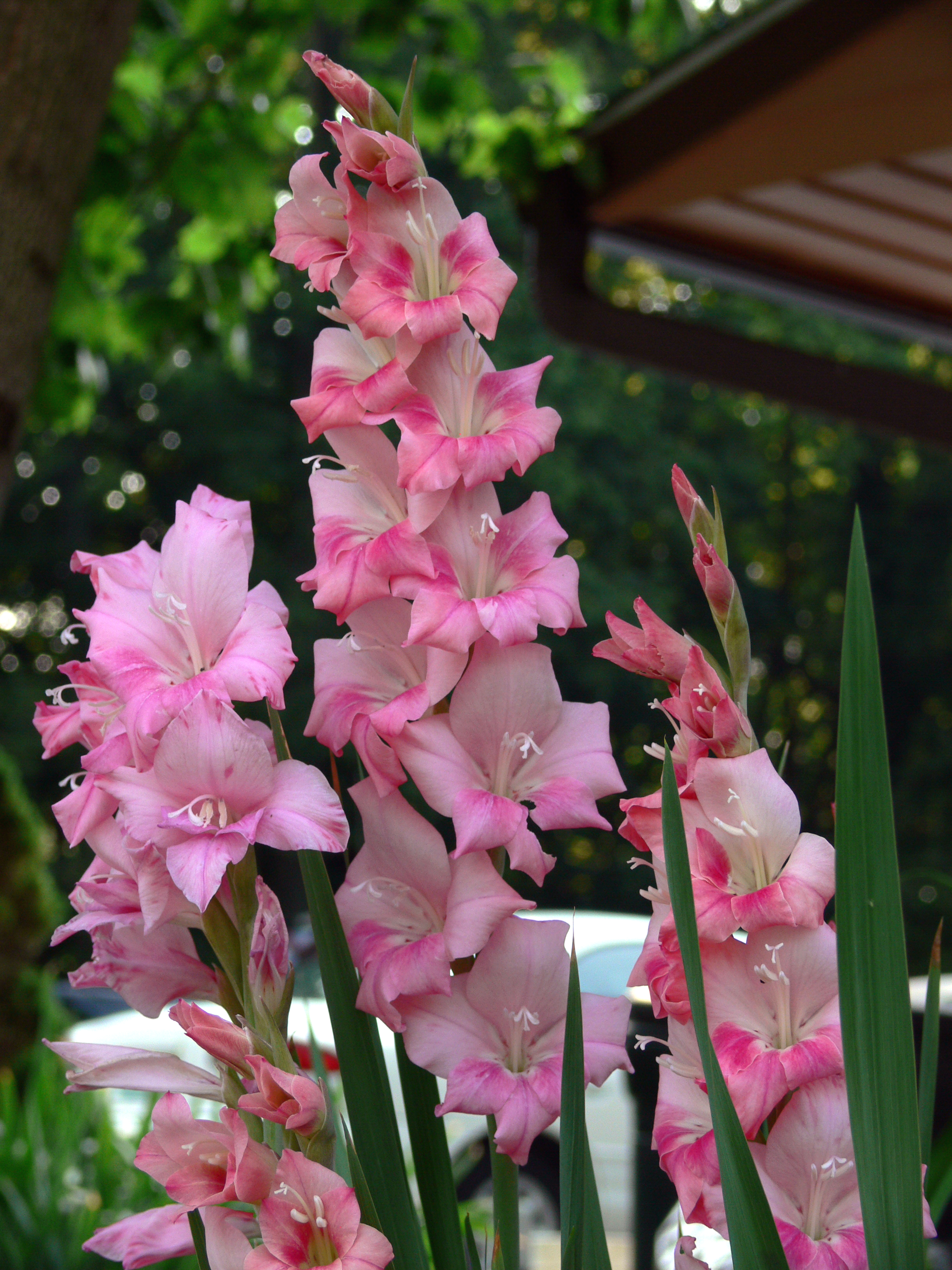

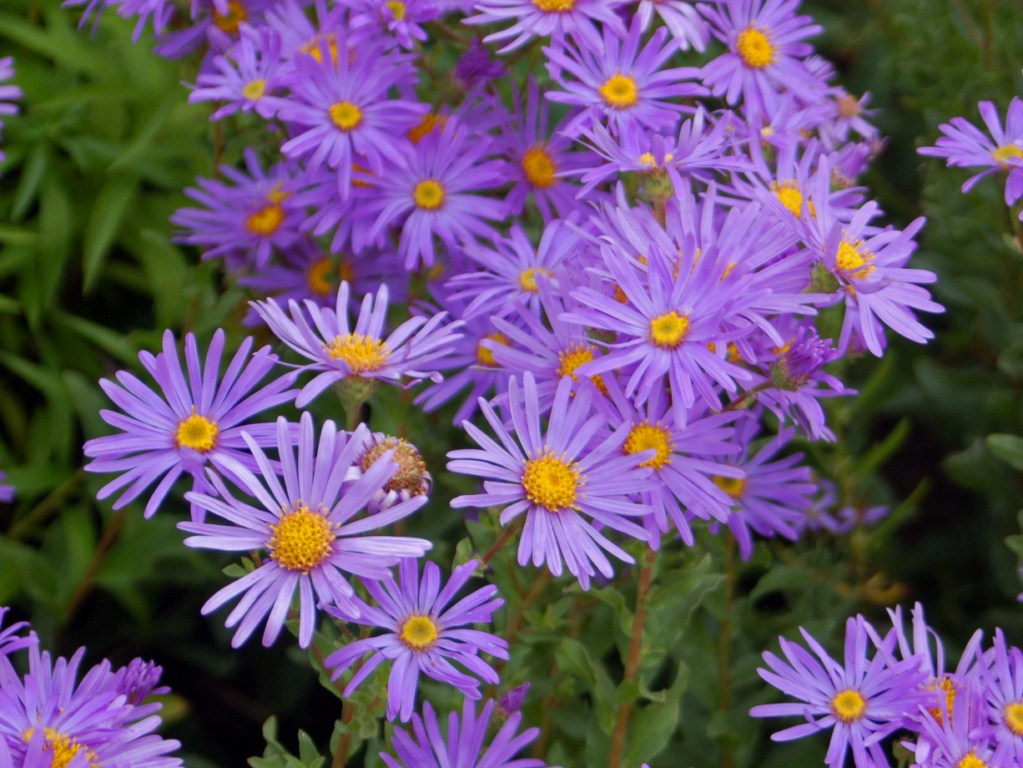

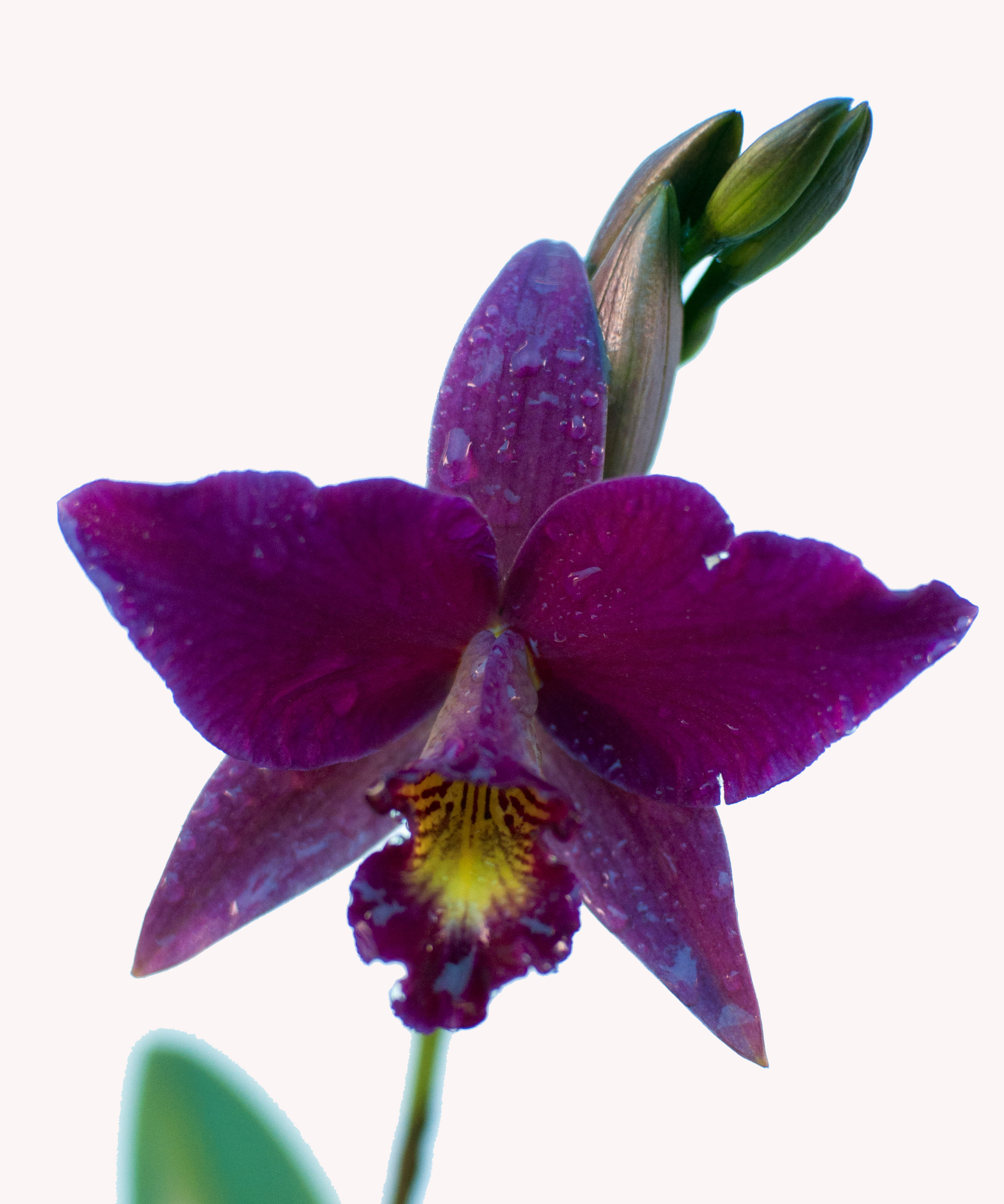

=== Krishi Vigyan Kendras (KVK) ===
There are two KVKs functioning under IIHR.

KVK Gonikoppal: This KVK is located at Virajpet taluk which is 50 km away from Madikeri and 92 km away from Mysore. It covers a total area of 17.5 hectares with office, laboratories, library and staff quarters and has demonstrations units like coffee based cropping system, Arecanut, Banana, Coorg mandarin, Papaya, Sapota, Guava, different vegetables, ployhouse, Piggery, Goatery and fodder block.

KVK Hirehalli: The KVK is located at Hirehalli, in Tumkur District, approximately 58 km from Bangalore on the Bangalore-Poona National Highway (NH-4). The KVK extends to a total area of the Kendra is 16.24 hectares and has an office cum-laboratory building, library, staff quarters, polyhouses, shed nets, threshing yard, nursery and landscaping.

== All India Coordinated Research Project on Fruits ==
The All India Coordinated Research Project on Fruits is a research program where the Central research institutes and the State Agricultural Universities (SAUs) work as a team to find solutions to various problems related to a specific topic. IIHR is the hosting central institute for All India Coordinated Research Project on Fruits

== Seed Portal ==
The institute makes its seeds and planting materials through its exclusive ICAR-IIHR Seed Portal for public. It has also integrated with SBI YONO app.

== National Horticulture Fair ==
Every year since 2018, the institute is organizing National Horticulture Fair (NHF) under various themes for showcasing its technologies to the farmers and entrepreneurs. About 50,000 people had visited the fair in the year 2020 which was organized under the theme 'Horticulture: Making Farming an Enterprise'. In 2021, NHF's theme was 'Horticulture: For Stand-up and Start-up India' and had a footfall of 56,000. In the year 2022, the fair went online. However, the 2023's fair is under the theme, Innovative Horticulture for Self-Reliance and was from Feb 22–25, 2023. This year's NHF 2024 theme was "nextgen technology led horticulture for sustainable development" and it attracted about 70,000 visitors during March 5–7, 2024.

== Arka Samachar ==
The institute broadcasts a monthly program on its YouTube channel[11] in Hindi, Kannada, Telugu, Tamil, Marathi, Malayalam and Odia. Released on the second Friday of each month, the episodes feature current horticultural production technologies and seasonal farming operations.

== Scholarly societies ==
The institute houses two scholarly societies viz., Society for Promotion of Horticulture (SPH]) which publishes Journal of Horticultural Sciences (JHS) and Association for Advancement for Pest Management of Horticultural Ecosystems (AAPMHE) which publishes Pest Management In Horticultural Ecosystems (PMHE) peer-reviewed journals to communicate the latest research outputs publicly in open access mode.

== Facilities ==
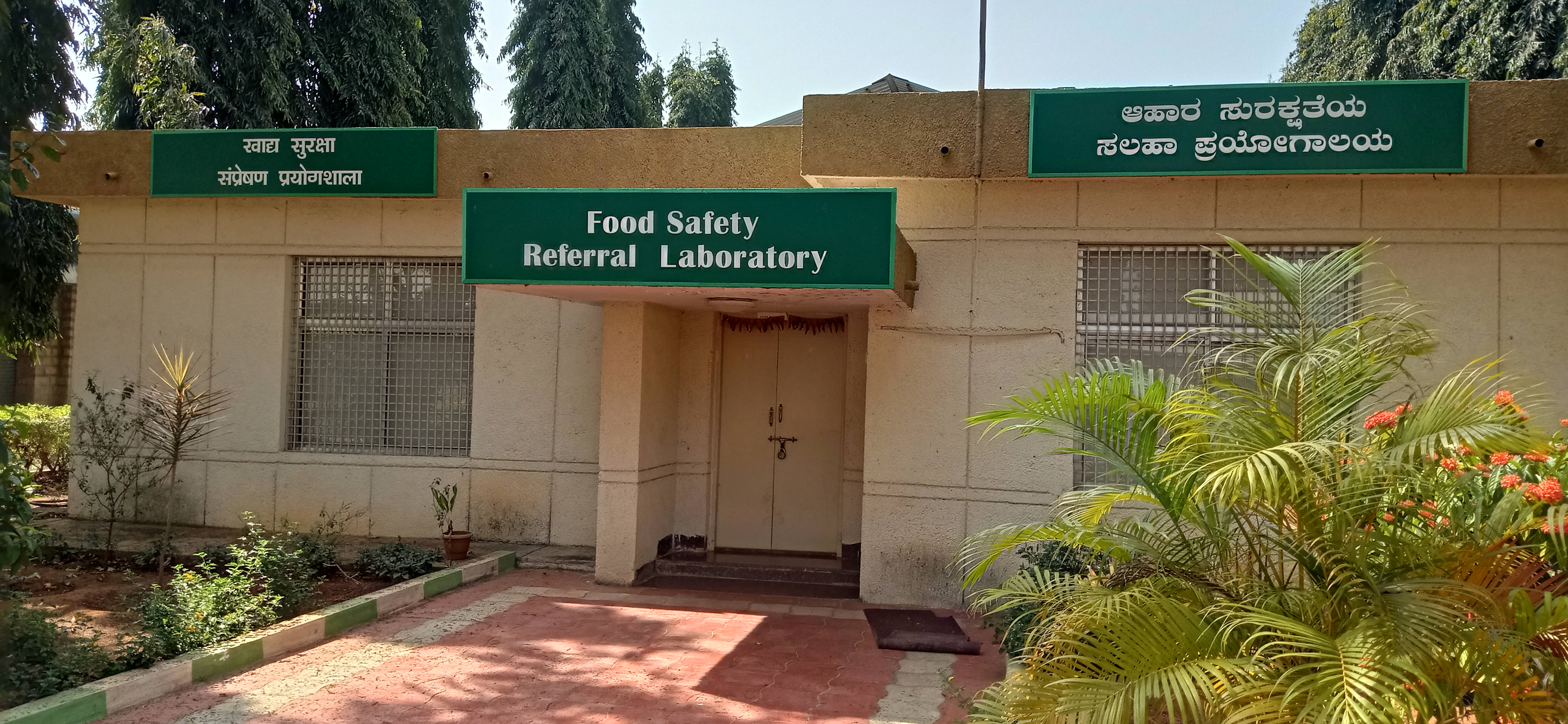
- Food Safety Referral Laboratory
  In addition to dedicated Food Safety Referral Laboratory, 65 purpose oriented laboratories with equipment like electron microscope, ultra centrifuge, HPLC, GLC, LC counter etc.
- Infrastructure facilities such as a series of poly houses and net houses, growth chambers, mist chambers, cold storage facilities, gene bank, local area network with video conferencing facilities, Seed processing and nursery units.
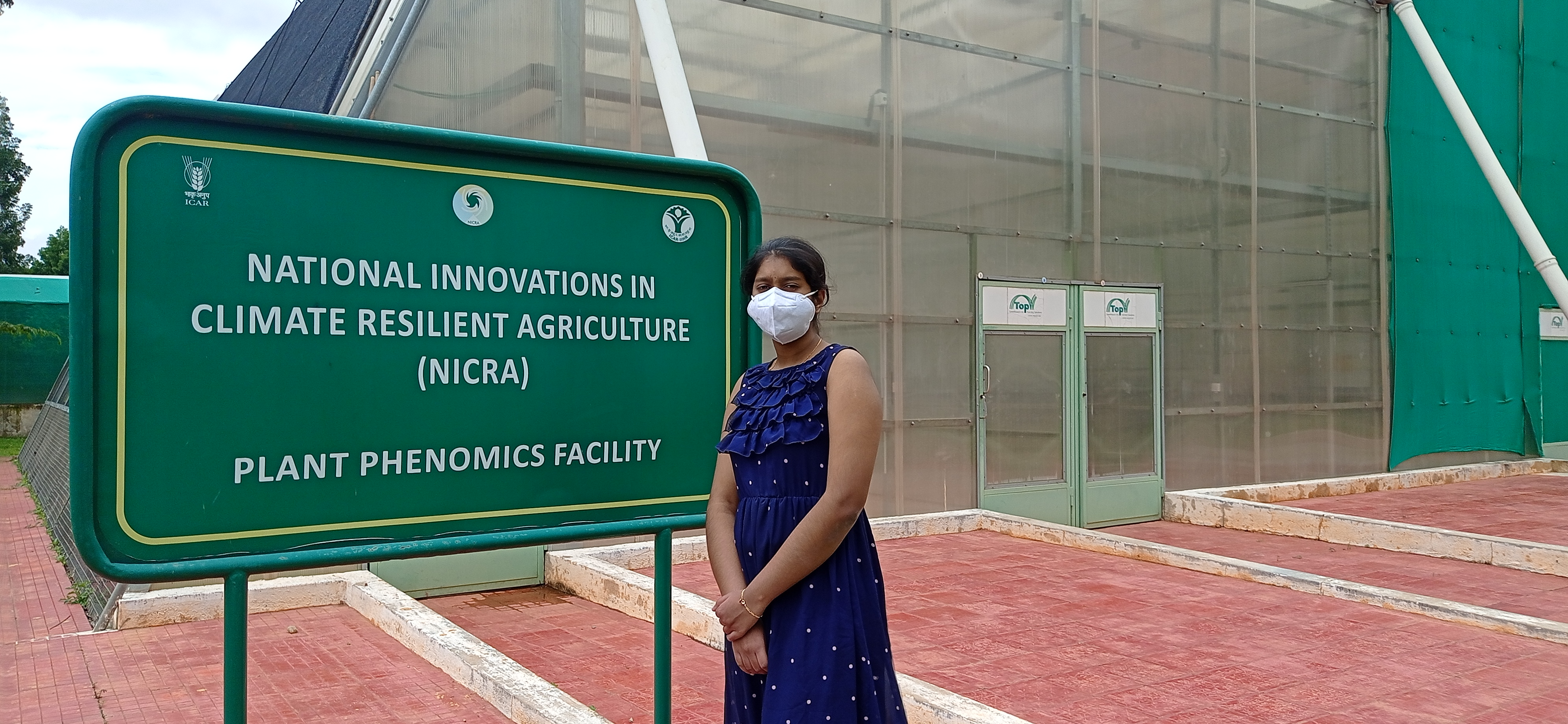
- Plant Phenomics Facility
  Plant phenomics facility
- Modern library
- Conference hall
- Auditorium
- Training hostel

The campus also hosts other amenities like Bank, Hospital and staff quarters.

== Achievements ==
IIHR is credited with the development of 170 varieties and hybrids of horticultural crops and many sustainable production, protection and post harvest management technologies.

Fruit Crops : Three varieties in papaya, five hybrids in mango, three varieties in guava, five hybrids in grapes, one variety each in pomegranate, annona, ber and passion fruit. IIHR has released a high yielding pink fleshed Arka Prabhat papaya hybrid, Arka Kiran, a red fleshed hybrid guava and Arka Sahan, a hybrid of annona with large globules and less seeds.

Vegetable Crops : The institute has developed and released 60 high yielding open pollinated varieties and 15 F1 hybrids in 24 vegetable crops resistant to pests and diseases for commercial cultivation. Some of them are:

- Arka Manik of Watermelon – triple resistant to pests and diseases
- Arka Anamika in okra resistant to Yellow Vein Mosaic Virus.
- Arka Komal of French bean resistant to rust.
- Arka Vikas tomato variety.
- Arka Ananya, a tomato hybrid with combined resistant to Tomato Leaf Curl Virus and Bacterial wilt.
- Arka Niketan and Arka Kalyan in onion.
- Arka Meghana chilli hybrids tolerant to thrips and viruses.
- Arka Suphal of chilli tolerant to powdery mildew.
- Arka Swetha, a high yielding male sterility base chilli hybrid.
- Arka Anand, bacterial wilt brinjal hybrid.
- Arka Lalima and Arka Kirthima, high yielding onion hybrids based on male sterility.

Ornamental Crops : IIHR has evolved improved varieties of gladiolus, chrysanthemum, bougainvillea, hibiscus, tube rose, rose, China aster, carnation, gerbera and crossandra. They have also developed China aster varieties such as Poornima, Kamini, Vilet cushion and Shashank and tube rose cultivars like Shringar, Suvasini, Prajwal and Vibahv and a crossandra variety by name Arka Ambara.

Mushrooms : IIHR is credited with the development of a spore less mutant of oyster mushroom, milky mushroom, Jews ear mushroom and a medicinal mushroom.

Production Technology : Some of the achievements of IIHR in the field of production technology are:

- Standardization of high density planting of bananas and pineapple.
- Grape root dog ridge, a new practice in dry land grape cultivation.
- Standardization of integrated water and nutrient management schedules like drip irrigation, fertigation, application of fertilizer in the active root feeding zone.
- Standardization of leaf and petiole diagnostics.
- Standardization of technology for foliar nutrition of micro nutrients and developed nutrients like mango special, banana special, citrus special and vegetable special.
- Curative efforts against the causative factors for occurrence of Spongy tissue, a major problem in mango.
- Biofertilizers such as PSB, Azospirallium and VAM.

Plant Protection : Plant protection technologies standardized or developed by IIHR are:

- Pest management using trap crops like African marigold for control of tomato fruit borer.
- Mustard for control of DBM in Cole crops.
- Plant products like neem soap and pongamia soap for control of major pests. Pseudomonas fluorescens, Purpureocillium lilacinum etc. for control of soil-borne diseases and nematodes.
- Pheromone trap for the mango fruit fly.
- Integrated disease management protocols and diagnostic kits for viruses.

Post Harvest Technology : IIHR has contributed to the standardization of Post Harvest Technology as:

- Extension the storage life of fruits and crops at various temperatures.
- Protocol for MOP and shrink wrapping technology.
- Protocols for preparation of osmo-dehydrated products.
- Fruit based beverages like mango squash, passion fruit squash, anona squash, passion fruit and banana blends.
- Culinary pastes and purees.
- Lactic acid fermentation of vegetables.
- Protocols for minimally processed foods.
- Technology for production of tomato, colored capsicum, cucumbers and melons under protected conditions.
- The technology for production of nursery seedlings using pro trays.
- Macro propagation protocols for various crops.
- Nucleic acid probes for many viruses.
- DNA fingerprinting techniques for characterization and documentation of germplasm.

Machineries : IIHR has developed machineries the following purposes.

- Nursery raising
- Seed sowing
- Seedling transplanting
- Weeding
- Harvesting of fruit crops
- Pickle making
- Mushroom spawn production

== Awards and recognitions ==
IIHR has been awarded and recognized as:

- Sardar Patel Outstanding ICAR Institution Award 1998 from Indian Council of Agricultural Research (ICAR).
- Sardar Patel Outstanding ICAR Institution Award 2010 from Indian Council of Agricultural Research (ICAR).
- Recognized as the post graduate research and training centre in horticulture by six universities.
- Second Prize in the field of Official Language Implementation for the year 2012-13 from Town Official Language Implementation Committee, Bangalore.
- BAGWANI, the Official Language Magazine of the institute, received the Best in house Magazine Award for the year 2011–2012.
- The pollen Cryo-Bank of the institute features in the Limca Book of Records 2001.
- Recognized as DBT-ICAR National Facility for virus –diagnosis and quality control in tissue culture plants.
- Recognized as the Phyto-sanitary certification agency for seeds and planting materials.
- Ranked No1 for the year 2019-20 and 2020-21 combined by the Indian Council of Agricultural Research (ICAR).

== See also ==
- Van Vigyan Kendra (VVK) Forest Science Centres
