= K. Kunhi Kannan =

Agricultural entomologist

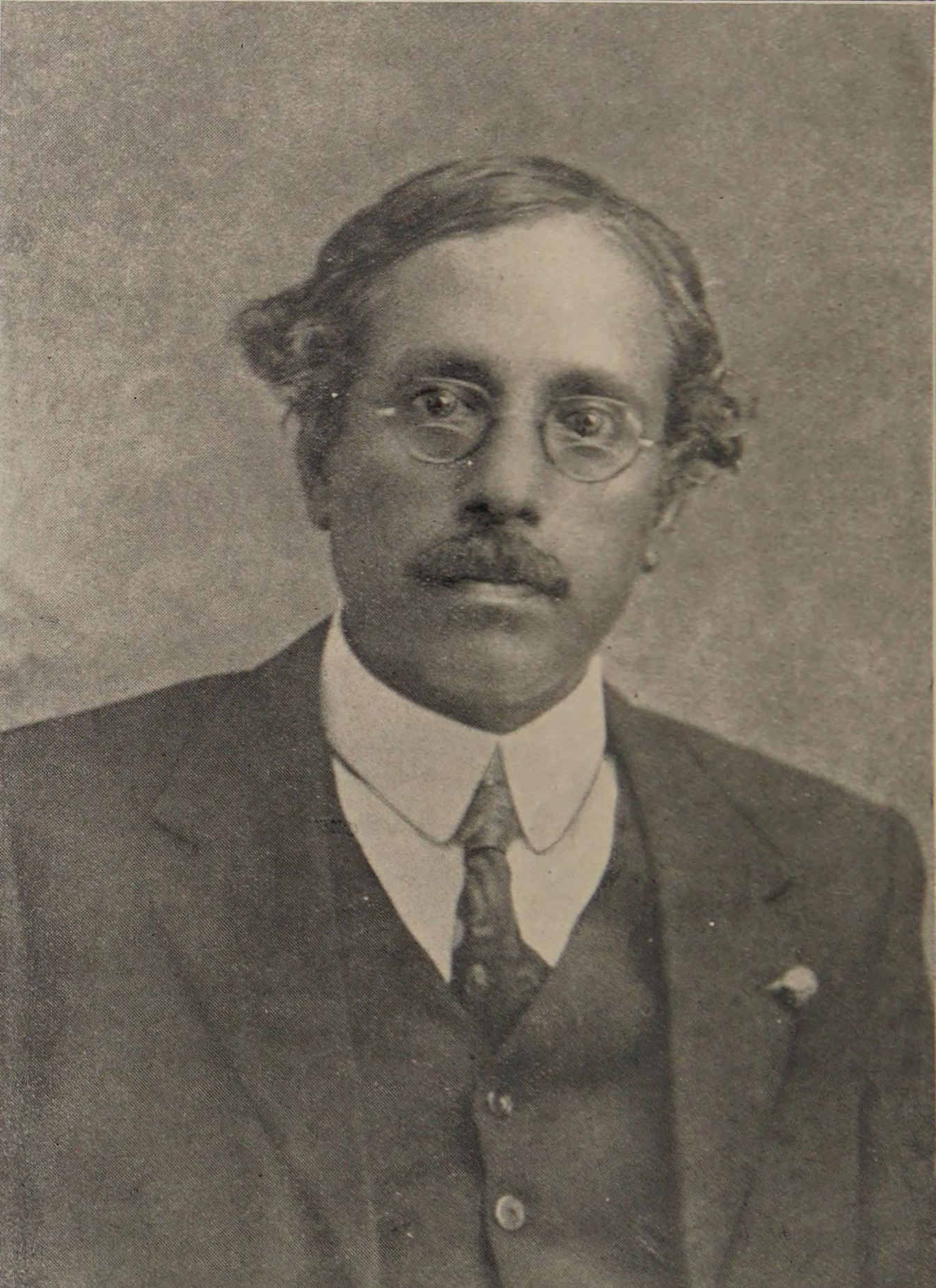

K. Kunhi Kannan also spelled K. Kunhikannan (15 October 1884 – 4 August 1931) was a pioneer agricultural entomologist and the first Indian to serve as an entomologist in the state of Mysore. Aside from entomology related publications, he wrote two books The West (1927) and A Civilisation at Bay (1931, posthumously published). He was a friend and admirer of the humanist Brajendra Nath Seal and the British writer Lionel Curtis who sought a single united world government. As an agricultural entomologist, he innovated several low-cost techniques for pest management and was a pioneer of classical biological control approaches in India.

== Life and career ==
Kunhikannan was born in Kannur in the Kunnathedath family (and the initial "K." would stand for Kunnathidathil). He graduated from the University of Madras and was appointed as an assistant to Leslie C. Coleman, the first government entomologist in the State of Mysore (Coleman was the first entomologist to be appointed in any province or state of India) on 19 November 1908 at a salary of Rs 150 per month. From 1914, with Coleman as director of agriculture, most entomology work was carried out by Kunhikannan. He was sent to study at Stanford University in 1919. This also included visits to several other research centres along the way including meeting Silvestri in Naples, G.A.K. Marshall in London, the Bureau of Entomology at Boston and on his return, stops in Japan and Colombo. His Ph.D. dissertation was an examination of digging adaptations in insect larvae that lacked legs, titled "The function of the prothoracic plate in mylabrid (Bruchid) larvae: (a study in adaptation)" (1923). He visited Hawaii several times between 1920 and 1921 attending meetings of the Hawaiian Entomological Society, examining biological control of Lantana and also collecting the seeds of algaroba. He also served as an Indian delegate (along with Swami Abhedananda) at the First Pan-Pacific Educational Conference from 11–24 August 1921. He returned to work in India on 1 November 1921. In 1923 Kunhikannan was made entomologist to the State of Mysore. Throughout his career, he took a special interest in cost-effective approaches to managing insect damage to crops and stored products. Kunhikannan was appointed to the board of Mysore University on 23 July 1927, the Vice Chancellor at the time being Sir Brajendra Nath Seal. When a proposal was made to offer marine biology at the Mysore University, Kunhikannan opposed it on the grounds that students needed to be able to relate to the environment immediately around them and not be far away from it.

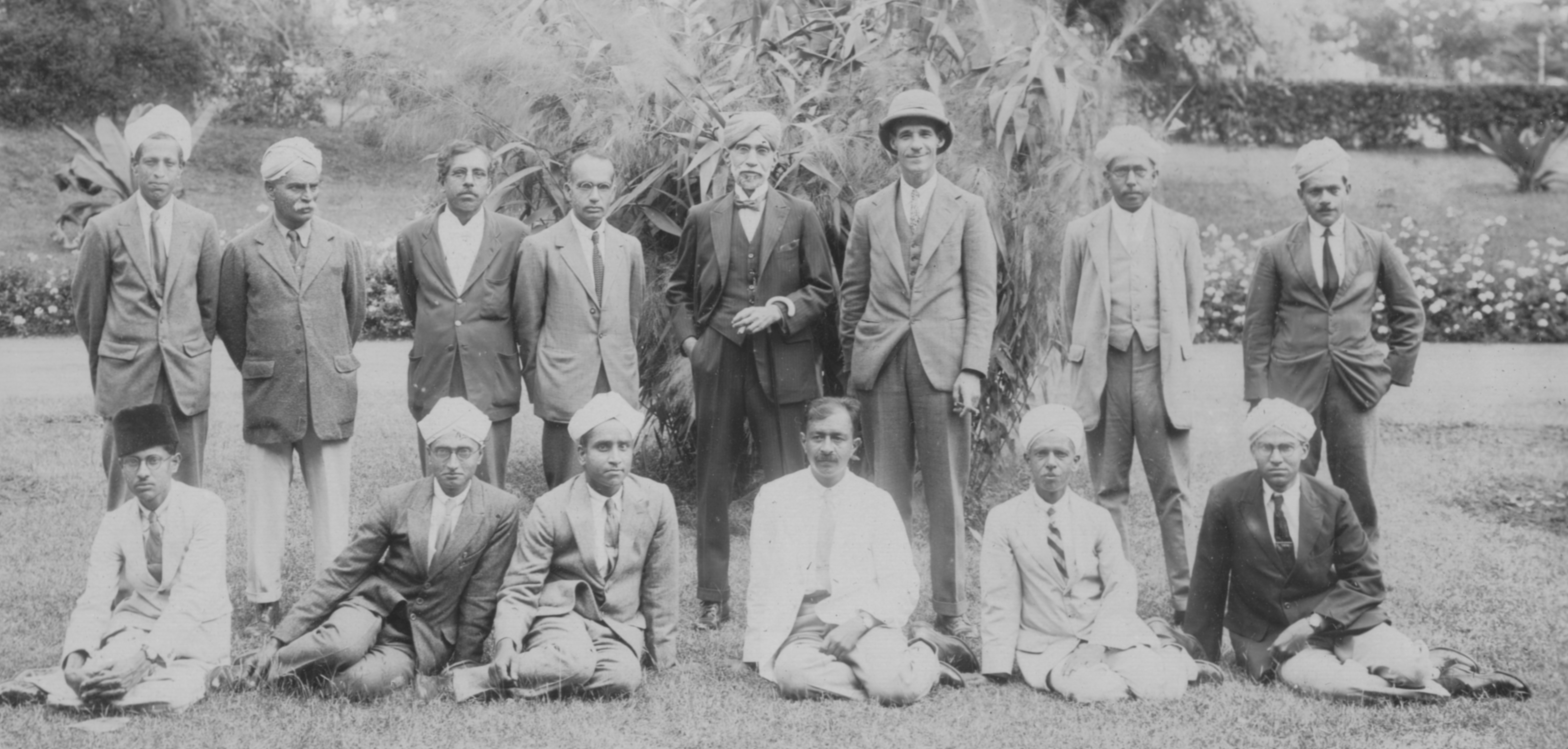
Kunhikannan (standing third from left) with Leslie C. Coleman (standing, sixth from left) and other agricultural scientists in Bangalore, c. 1928

An asthmatic from an early age, he was not physically very active. As a young man he held radical views about which he was outspoken while his father, well read in Sanskrit lore, advised him that "when you consider all aspects, you will feel convinced that your views are hasty." After his stay and travels to the United States and through Europe, he wrote a book called The West (1927), admiring some aspects and criticizing some western practices. He saw, first-hand, the lynching of blacks in the United States which disturbed him greatly and he wrote about the dangers of media control (by William Randolph Hearst in this case) and the fierce individualism that was encouraged by the West. An Indian reviewer considered it one of the fair reviews of the West at a time when eastern criticism had become fashionable. After receiving a lot of interest in his 1927 book he considered several other books, one on India and still others on education and other subjects. His book on India which was to be his commentary on the Round Table Conferences to discuss the future of India was published posthumously as A Civilisation at Bay (1931). The book supported various Indian traditions with a chapter on the merits of the joint family, four chapters covering caste that include theories for its origin and rationalizations for its existence. In a talk delivered at Stanford, he explored the history and development of philosophy and science in India.

C.F. Andrews, friend and follower of Gandhi, quoted Kunhikannan's The West extensively in his book The True India (1939) stating that One of the reasons I have chosen to quote so largely from Dr Kunhikannan in this chapter is because the note of bitterness is absent from his writing. His desire to be fair to the Western system is transparent. D. V. Gundappa recounted that Kunhikannan was a member of a literature study group called Bangalore Study Club that ran in K.S. Krishna Iyer’s Irish Press near Siddikatte. Members included Anantapadmanabha Iyer, brother of Balasundaram Iyer a Municipal Councillor. Kunhikannan signed with his initials as "K. K. K." which was expanded jocularly as ಕ್ರಿಮಿಕೀಟಕಾಲಾಂತಕ (Krimi-Kīṭa-Kālāntaka = "Killer of germs and insects").

== Contributions to applied entomology ==
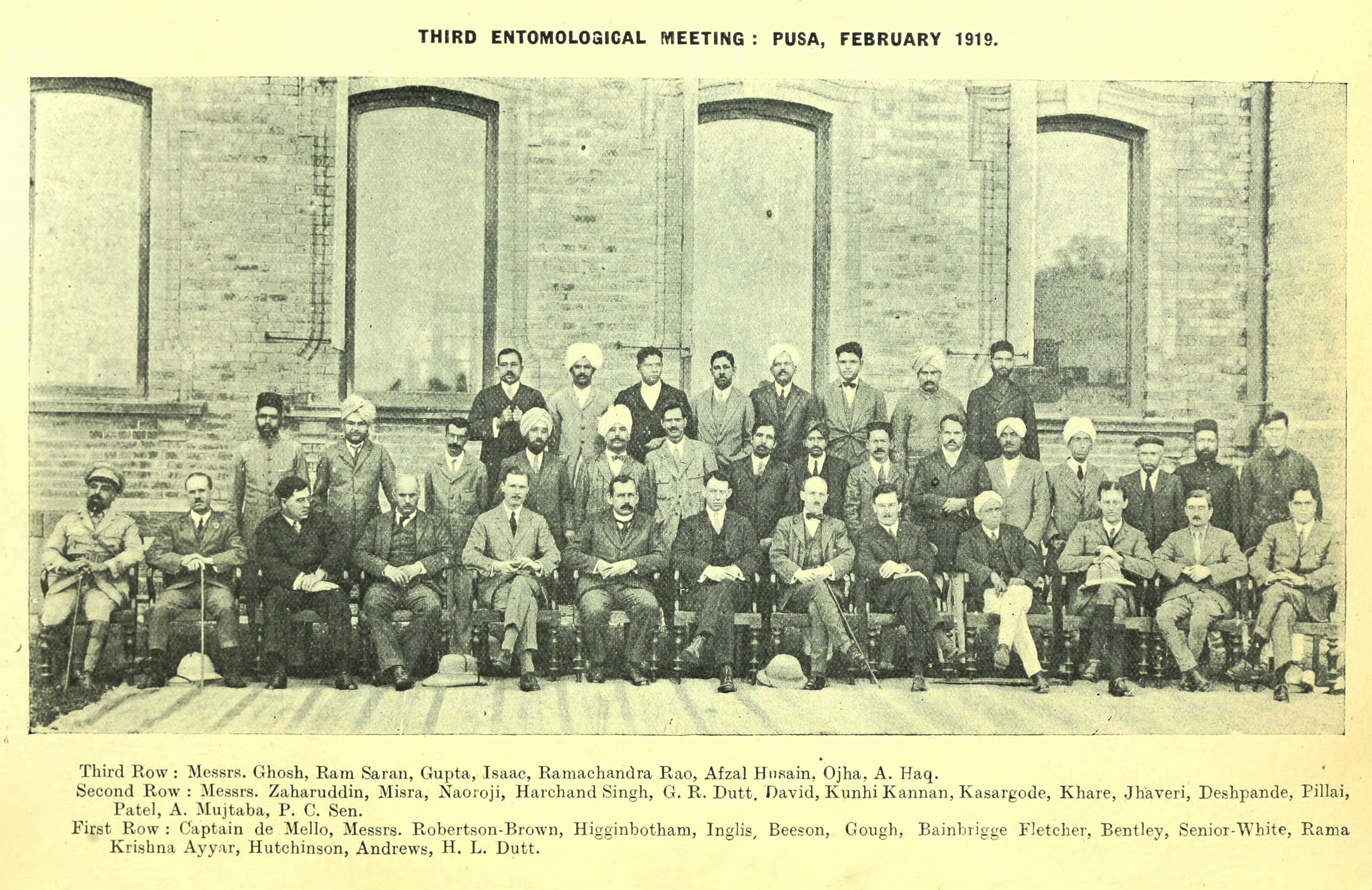
Kunhikannan in 1919 at Pusa with other entomologists (second row, seventh from left)

In his early years, Kunhikannan took an interest in natural history and made several casual observations and notes, in 1907 he observed that bats (Scotophilus kuhli) that roosted in hollows of coconut palms were infested by bedbugs that he identified as Cimex rotundatus. In 1912 he noted that Papilo polytes was trimorphic in Bangalore. As an agricultural entomologist, he was keenly sensitive to traditional practices and the economic situation of farmers. Keeping with the idea of cost efficiency in control measures against insects, he considered the use of a mesh below manure heaps that allowed coconut beetles (Oryctes) to burrow down as larvae but blocked the emergence of hard-bodied adults. Kunhikannan held the view that ancient practices often had their roots in well-founded facts. He examined traditional storage technique which involved the use of bamboo bins and straw. He developed a cultural trapping practice of using sugarcane trash to attract the adult moths of Diatraea sp. in the daytime which could then be physically destroyed by hand. He examined the effect of mercury vapour on the control of pulse beetles in storage, a system used by Malabar farmers for centuries, and found them to inhibit the development of eggs when used in small containers. He also found that some farmers used a layer of castor oil on the top of seeds placed in a bamboo bin along with a few drops of mercury. He found that the castor oil layer did help in keeping down emergence of pulse beetles. He also observed the practice of storing pulses under a layer of ragi. He found that pulse beetles emerge to the surface and do not return below, reducing the damage to pulses. He then found that a layer of sand at least half an inch thick at the top of grains helped in effectively controlling damage at little cost. A similar approach was independently arrived by T.B. Fletcher based on studies in Pusa. Kunhikannan also investigated traditionally used fish-poison plants and identified an alcoholic extract of Mundulea sericea as a treatment of wood against termites. He noted the effectiveness of using a layer of kerosene in rice fields to control Nymphula depunctalis.

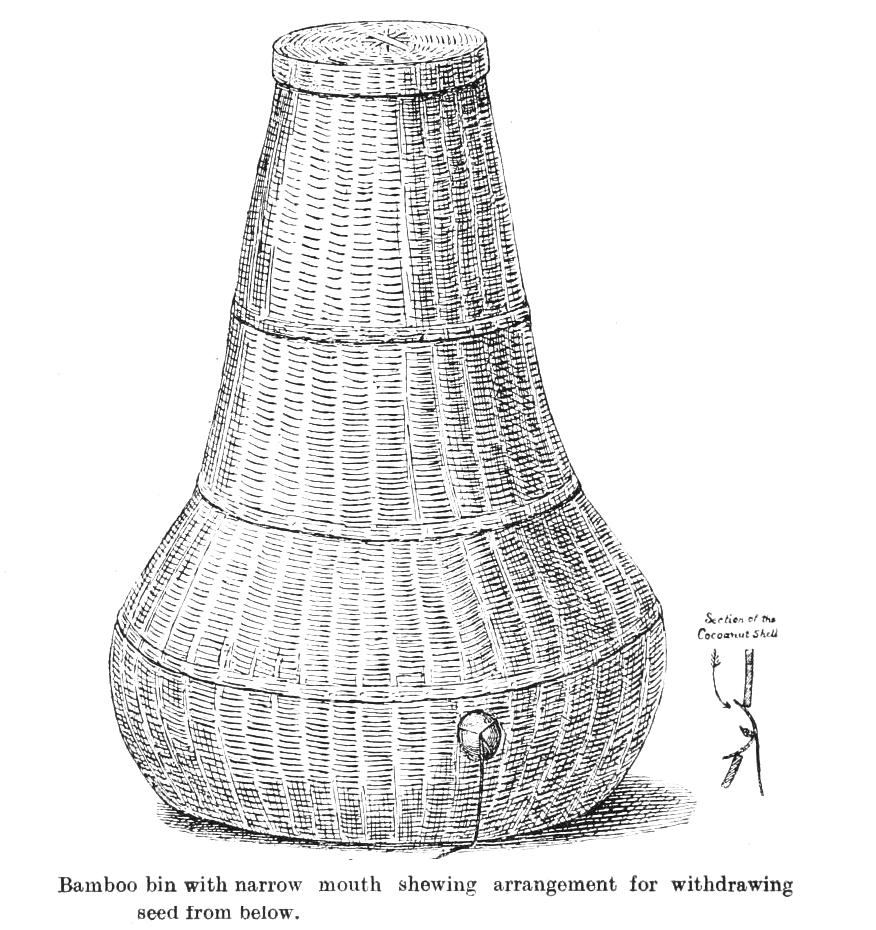
Traditional pulse storage basket ("moodai") with narrow top on which a layer of sand was introduced. This acted as a trap for pulse beetles which after emerging up were unable to return down to the seeds to lay eggs. The pulses are drawn from the bottom without disturbing the sand layer.

Kunhikannan expressed his views on the content for agricultural education at a conference in 1923. He believed that farmers who knew the practices of farming from their traditions ought to be provided short one-year courses to supplement their knowledge rather than be provided with "alien ideas". He examined the effect of the Lantana seed fly (Agromyza (Ophiomyia) lantanae) in Hawaii and was of the opinion that it had little effect in destroying the seeds. The fly was released in Bangalore and although populations established widely, there was no reduction in Lantana. Later studies showed that seed viability is reduced, but not enough to be an effective control. Along with Coleman, he was involved in the introduction of scale insects Dactylopius tomentosa from J.C. Hutson who had used it to control Opuntia dillenii in Ceylon. He introduced techniques for mass-rearing Trichogramma parasites on Corcyra eggs for control of lepidopteran sugarcane pests. He introduced a method of using sugarcane trash to attract and destroy sugarcane shoot borers Chilo infuscatellus. In 1926 Kunhikannan examined the growth of robber-flies Hyperechia xylocopiformis and was able to show that the larvae developed inside the cells of Xylocopa bees, feeding on the bee larvae.

Kunhikannan recorded a variation in Coccus viridis which initially appeared to have a seven segmented antenna in Sri Lanka but he claimed that later generations tended to have a reduction in segments over time to five, four, and finally most had three segmented antenna. He called the new South Indian form Coccus colemani "as a mark of gratitude for the valuable scientific training I have received" from Coleman. It is sometimes treated a subspecies of C. viridis. E.E. Green did not believe that this was a mutation as claimed by Kunhikannan.

Kunhikannan was a promoter of Mesquite (Prosopis juliflora) as a plant for the arid-zone and introduced it to the Hebbal farm. At the time of his death, Kunhikannan was studying the spread of the coffee berry borer in Mysore, then known as Stephanoderes hampei. Kunhikannan claimed that the beetle was first detected in Mysore in June 1930. A scheme for investigating plants used as fish toxins as potential insecticides was proposed by him for funding to the Imperial Council for Agricultural Research and this was approved in 1935. Work on this line was continued by T. V. Subrahmaniam and Magadi Puttarudriah.

== Publications ==
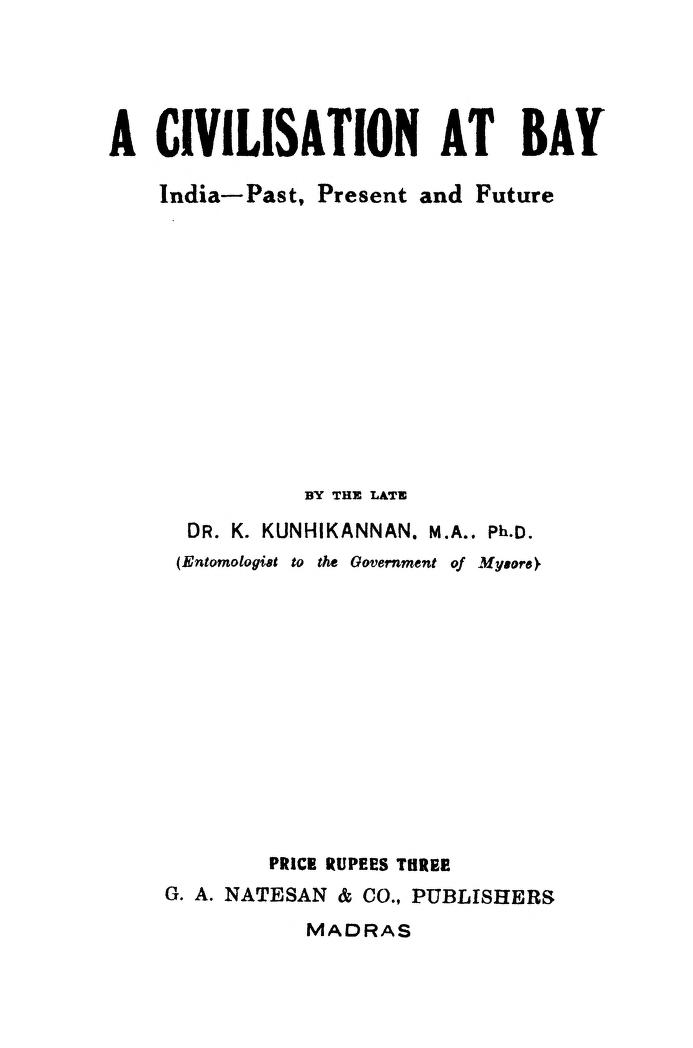
Title page of the book published posthumously in 1931

Apart from the two books and brochures published as part of the Department of Agriculture, Kunhikannan also contributed reports and short papers, mainly on entomology but he also took an interest in farm economics. A partial list of his publications includes:

- A serious Pest of Cardamoms (Planters' Chronicle, XIX. No. 14, pp. 824–836, December 1924—from Journal Mysore Agric. Union; also in Mysore Agricultural Calendar 1925, pp. 32–36).
- The Coffee Borer. (Mysore Agric. Dept. Calendar 1925 pp. 5–8.) [Xylotrechus quadripes.]
- Report of the Entomologist, (Ann. Rept. Agric. Dept. Mysore, pt. II, pp. 10–12, 1925.)
- The Lime Tree Borer (Chelidonium cinctum), (Mysore Agricultural Calendar 1924: pp. 16–18)
- The Coffee Borer (The Planters' Chronicle, XX, pp. 922–924, Dec. 1925.)
- The Jola Ear-head Fly. (Journal of the Mysore Agricultural & Experimental Union, VII, p. 85, 1925.) [Atherigona soccata]

Kunhikannan was a subscriber to the newsletter of the Servants of India Society run from Poona. To this periodical, he contributed reviews of books on a range of topics including:

- A Die-hard on India. Review of Swaraj: The Problem of India by J.E. Ellam. (1931) Servant of India 14(3):34.
- Evolution of Civilization. Review of Civilization in Transition (1789-1870) by H.C. Thomas and W.A. Hamm. (1930) Servant of India 13(19):226.
- The New Faith [dealing with humanism]. Review of A Preface to Morals by Walter Lippman. (1930) Servant of India 13(18):212-213.

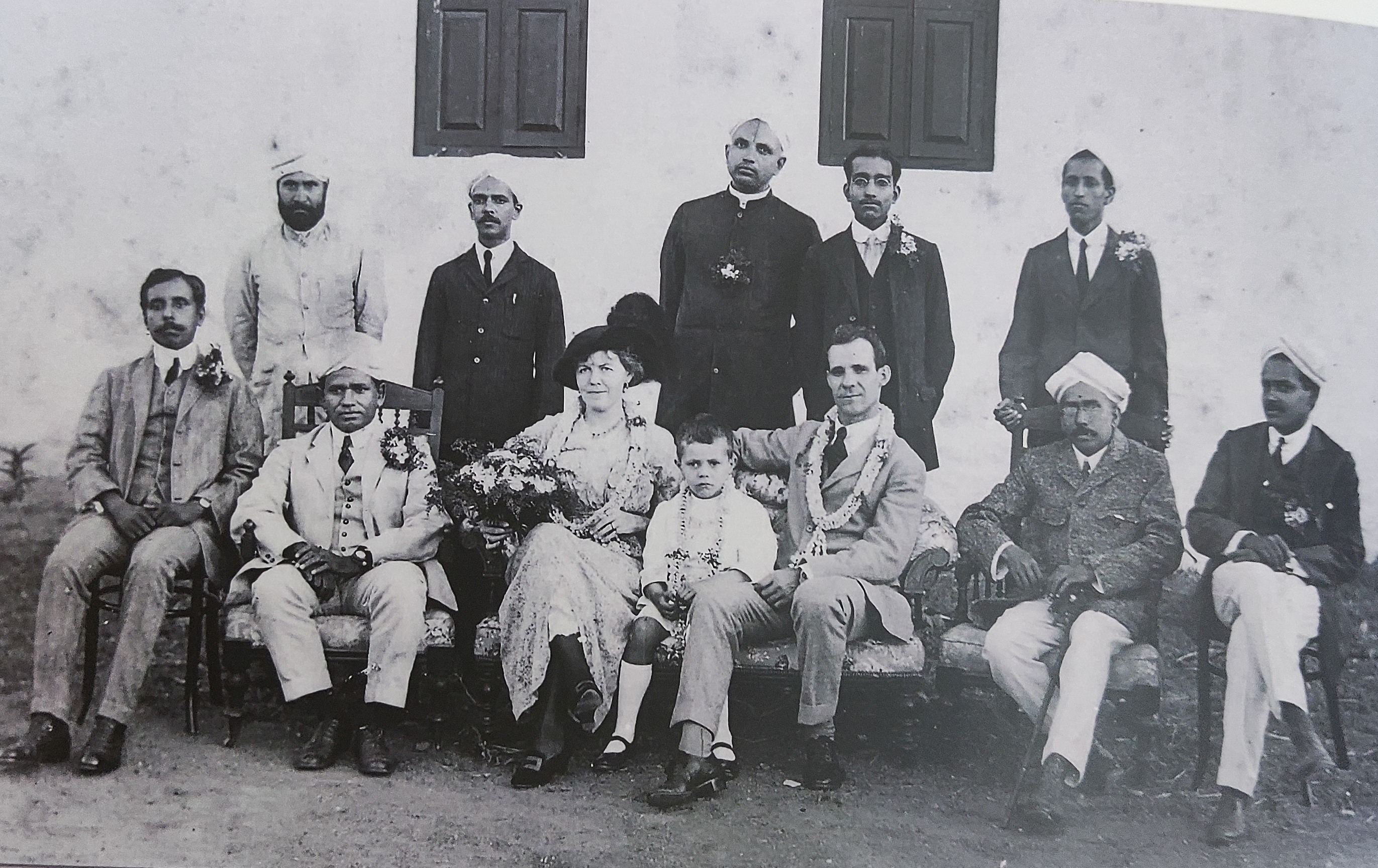
Kunhikannan seated at left with Leslie Coleman and others

== Death ==
Kunhikannan died suddenly from a cerebral haemorrhage at the age of 47. He was married to Koussalia who published his 1931 book posthumously through G.A. Natesan publishers. Coleman stated that Kunhikannan's name "will find enduring association with Entomological investigations in this State, more especially with reference to the devising of methods of insect control adapted to our conditions.... Dr Kunhikannan displayed a real genius and his is a shining example for the Entomologist of the future". Another obituarist noted "the manner in which he broke away from the thraldom of the spray pump". Kunhikannan was succeeded in his position as entomologist to the state of Mysore by T. V. Subrahmaniam, brother of T. V. Ramakrishna Ayyar. Gynaikothrips kannani a thrips species collected on Eugenia from Bangalore was named after him by the Californian entomologist Dudley Moulton in 1929.
