= Magadi Puttarudriah =

Indian entomologist (1903–1983)

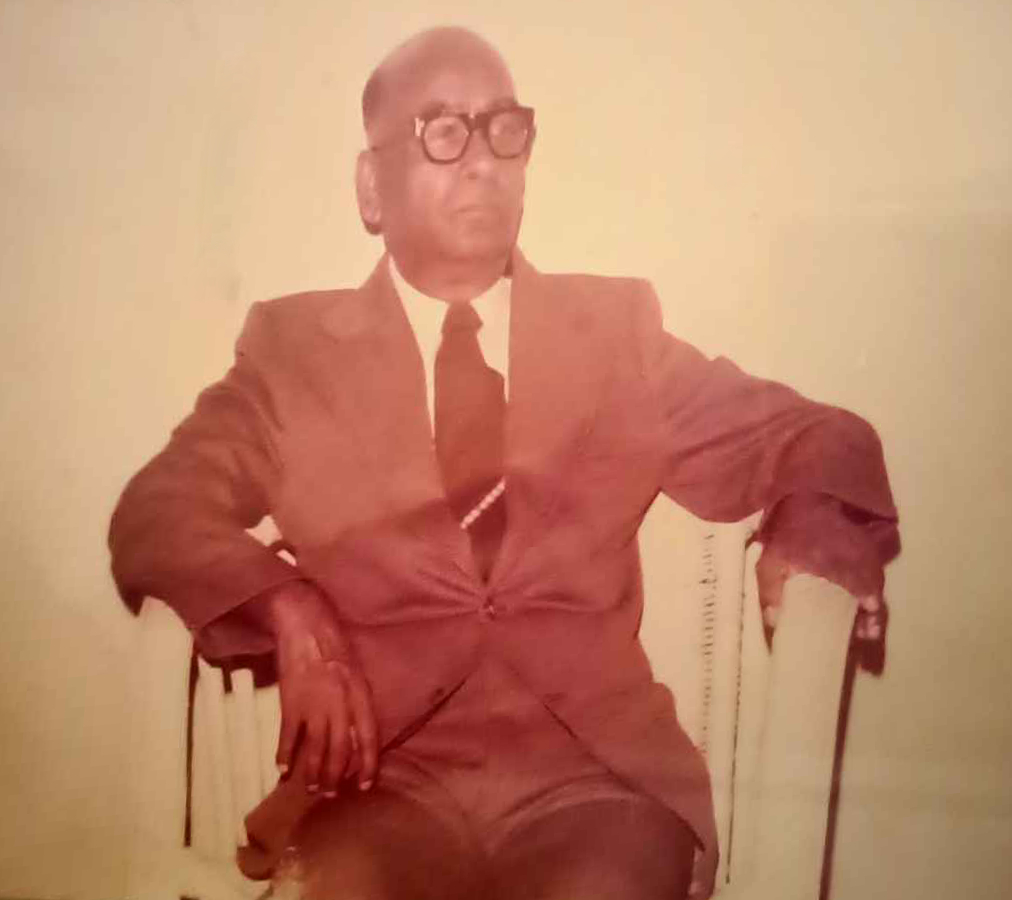
- Born: 16 December 1903; Magadi
- Died: 12 December 1983 (aged 79)
- Education: Central College, Bangalore BSc; University of California, Berkeley MS, PhD
- Occupation: entomologist
- Known for: first professor of entomology at the University of Agricultural Sciences, Bangalore
- Spouse: Saraswathamma (m. 1936)
- Children: 4 daughters

Magadi Puttarudriah (16 December 1903 – 12 December 1983) was an Indian entomologist who worked in the Government of Mysore and after 1957 in the Government of Karnataka. He was the first professor of entomology at the University of Agricultural Sciences, Bangalore when it was established in 1964.

== Life and work ==
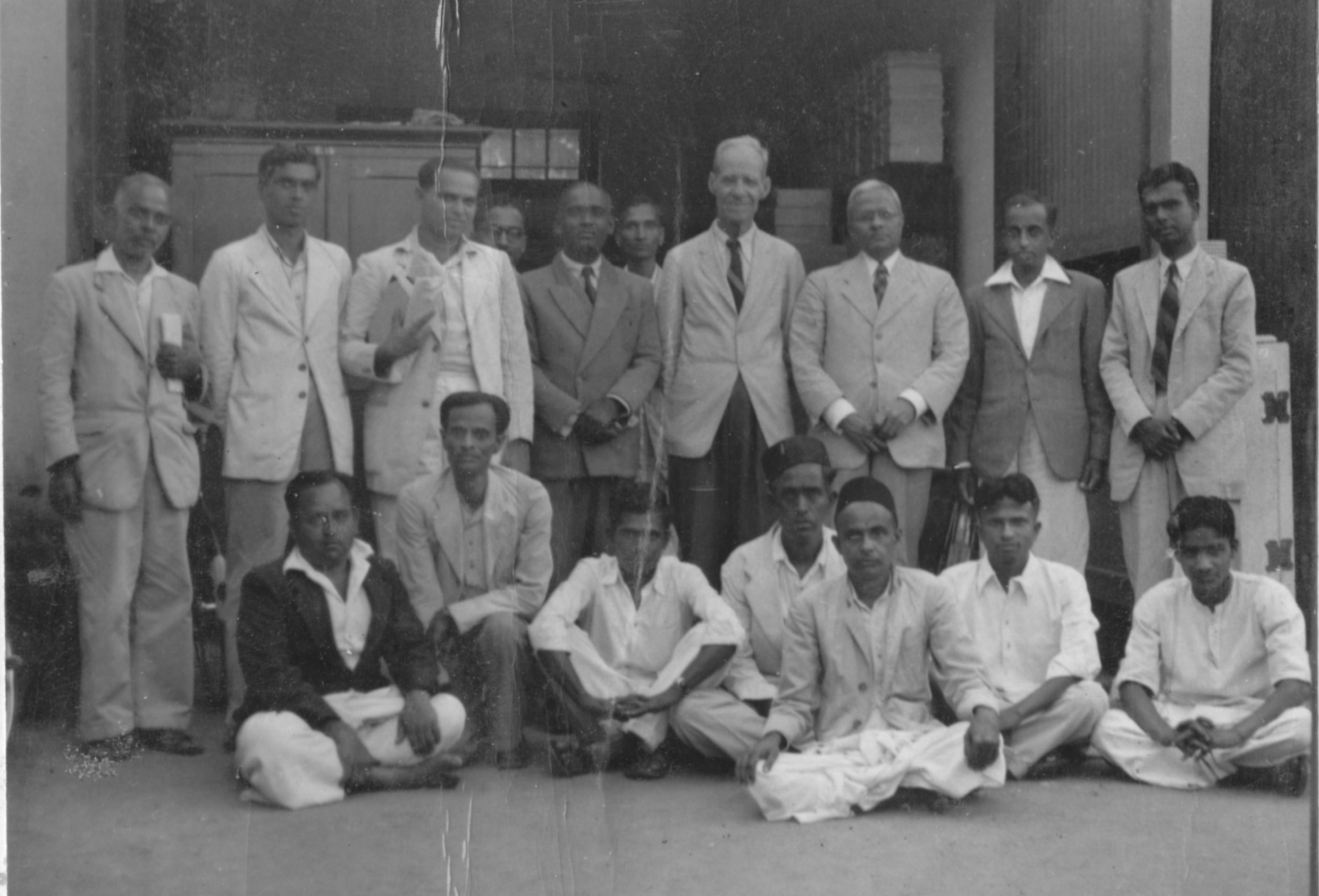
Puttarudriah (standing leftmost) in 1953-54 during a visit of Leslie Coleman

Puttarudriah was born in Magadi in a farming family and obtained his BSc from Central College, Bangalore in 1932–33. He then worked in the Department of Agriculture as part of a scheme to study fish poisons and the potential for their use as pesticides. This continued to be a research interest even later. He was later posted to Chikmagalur to enforce the Pest Control Act to control the coffee white stem borer Xylotrechus quadripes. He was in charge of enforcing control measures against the pest between 1940 and 1944. In 1944 he was transferred to Bangalore and was involved in teaching diploma students at the Agricultural School in Hebbal. In 1948 he was deputed to study at the University of California, Berkeley, obtaining his MS (1949) and PhD (1951) as a student of Ray Fred Smith. Other influences included Edward Arthur Steinhaus and Abraham E. Michelbacher. His MS research was on the biological control of the alfalfa looper in California and PhD work on the biology of Heliothis phloxiphaga. He visited the Commonwealth Institute of Biological Control, Belleville in Canada, the Citrus Experimental Station at Riverside, and the Gill Tract Laboratory at Albany for Biocontrol. He also visited the Rothamstead Laboratory and Edinburgh University. He returned in 1951 and joined the department of agriculture and also served as a professor of entomology in the newly created University of Agricultural Sciences in 1964. He also served as a director of instruction and as principal from 1967 until his retirement in 1971. His studies were influenced by Paul DeBach and he tended to avoid chemical measures, favouring biological control and cultural practices in management. He produced one of the first and most influential guides to pest protection for crops written in Kannada.

Along with G.P. Channabasavanna and others he discovered the existence of the ladybird Cryptolaemus montrouzieri in large numbers on Araucaria in Bangalore in July 1951 and noted that although it had been introduced in India in 1898 to control mealybugs, it had been recorded as not having established. He identified an eriophyid mite causing bunching of leaves in mangoes. The bunchy top symptom had been confused with mango malformation which was also caused by eriophyid mites and noted before by M.J. Narasimhan. He examined ladybird predators and hymenopteran parasites that could be used in the Mysore region. In 1955 he made an attempt to list all the known insects and mite species of Mysore state.

In 1936, he married Saraswathamma daughter of Hanumanthe Gowda of Torehalli who taught at a school in Gubbi taluk and edited the ''Vokkaligara'' magazine. They had four daughters.
