= Kunhikannan =

Kunhikannan or Kunjikannan is a name used in Kerala in India. The diminutive prefix kunji or kunhi refers to a child and kannan, the south Indian name for Krishna. Notable persons with the name include:

- K. Kunhikannan (1884-1931), entomologist
- Keeleri Kunhikannan (1858-1939), pioneer of circus in Kerala
- Mavilodan Kunjikannan (1926–2010), journalist
