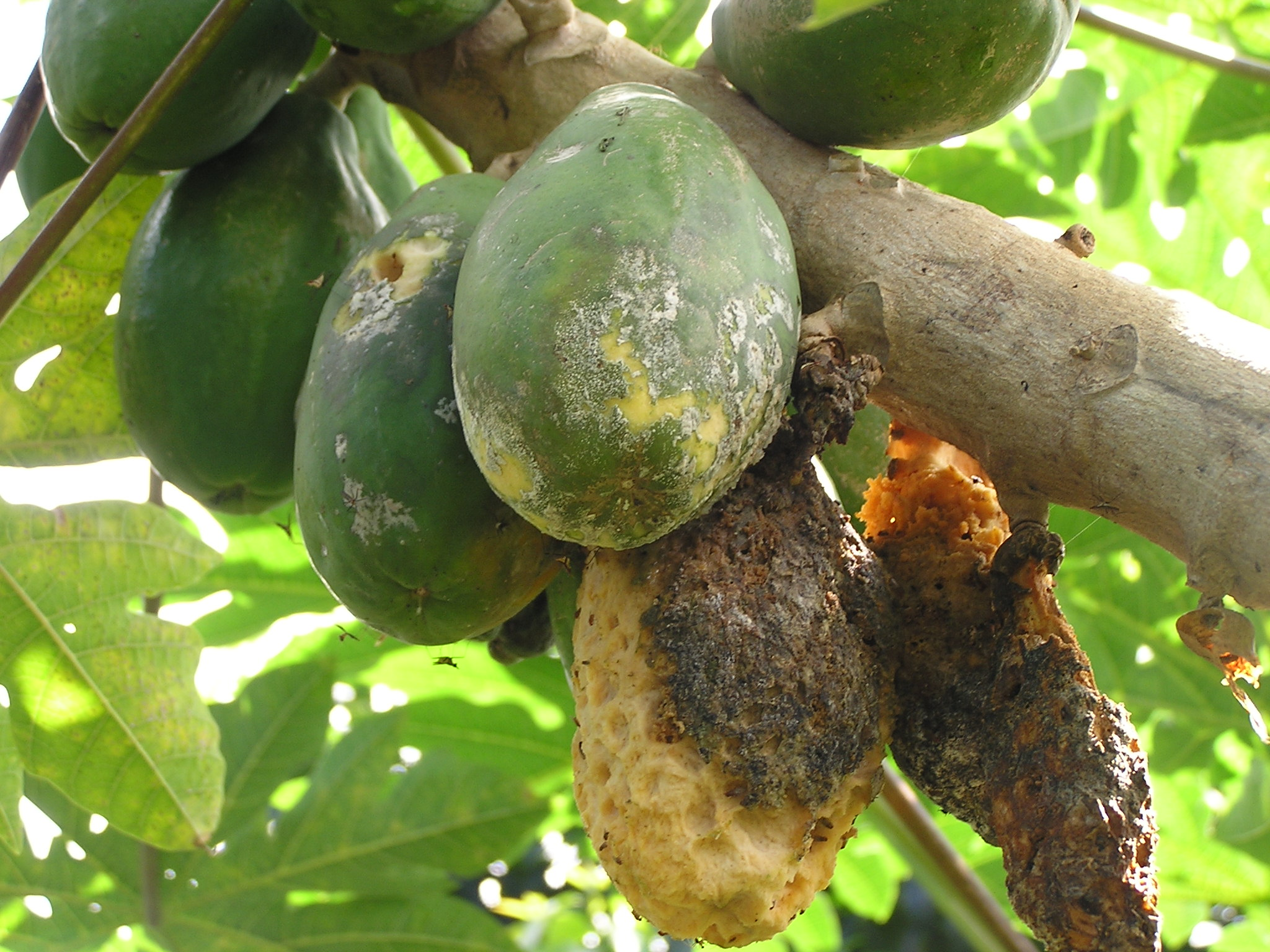
- Mycelium associated with snail or slug feeding and bird feeding injury to papaya near Kainaliu, Hawaiʻi

Scientific classification
- Domain: Eukaryota
- Clade: Sar
- Clade: Stramenopiles
- Phylum: Oomycota
- Class: Peronosporomycetes
- Order: Peronosporales
- Family: Peronosporaceae
- Genus: Phytophthora
- Species: P. palmivora

Binomial name
- Phytophthora palmivora Butler

Synonyms
- Kawakamia carica Hara; Phytophthora arecae (L.C.Coleman) Pethybr.; Phytophthora cactorum var. arecae (L.C.Coleman) Sacc. & Trotter; Phytophthora carica (Hara) Hori; Phytophthora carica (Hara) Hori ex K.Sawada; Phytophthora faberi Maubl.; Phytophthora heveae A.W.Thomps.; Phytophthora omnivora var. arecae L.C.Coleman; Phytophthora palmivora var. heterocystica Babacauh, 1983; Phytophthora palmivora var. heveae (A.W.Thomps.) Orellana; Phytophthora palmivora var. palmivora (E.J.Butler) E.J.Butler, 1919; Phytophthora palmivora var. piperis H.R.A.Muller, 1936; Phytophthora palmivora var. theobromae (L.C.Coleman) Orellana; Phytophthora parasitica var. parasitica Dastur, 1913; Phytophthora parasitica var. sesami Prasad, 1957; Phytophthora theobromae L.C.Coleman; Pythium palmivorum E.J.Butler

= Phytophthora palmivora =

Species of single-celled organism

Phytophthora palmivora is an oomycete that causes bud-rot of palms, fruit rot or kole-roga of coconut and areca nut. These are among the most serious diseases caused by fungi and moulds in South India. Outbreaks occur almost every year in Malnad, Mysore, North & South Kanara, Malabar and other areas. Similar diseases of palms are also known to occur in Sri Lanka, Mauritius, and Sumatra. The causative organism was first identified as P. palmivora by Edwin John Butler in 1917.

== Biology ==
=== Reproduction ===
Phytophthora palmivora produces abundant sporangia on V8 agar under continuous fluorescent light. However, light is not required for sporangia production on infected papaya fruit. Sporangia are usually produced in clusters sympodially. Sporangia are papillate and ovoid with the widest part close to the base. They are easily washed off and each detached sporangium contains a short pedicel. The average size of the sporangia is 50×33 μm with a length of about 1.6 times longer than it is wide. Sporangia germinate directly in a nutrient medium by producing germ tubes that develop into mycelial masses. In water, however, zoospores are released from germinating sporangia. Zoospores aggregate and form distinct patterns at 16 °C (61 °F) in water.

Chlamydospores produced in infected papaya fruit and pure papaya juice are thick-walled. However, chlamydospores produced in papaya juice at lower concentrations or in other kinds of fruit juice are mostly thin-walled. In the presence of nutrients, chlamydospores germinate by producing germ tubes that continue to grow and form mycelial masses. In water, chlamydospores germinate by producing short germ tubes, each with a sporangium at the tip.

Sexual reproduction requires the presence of opposite mating types known as A1 and A2. Both A1 and A2 isolates can produce zoospores by selfing when stimulated by sex hormones produced by A2 and A1. Light is inhibitory to zoospore formation but stimulatory to zoospore germination. Mature zoospores can be induced to germinate by treatment with 0.25% KMnO_{4} for 20 min and incubation under light during germination.

Although sporangia and zoospores may survive in soil for short periods, chlamydospores are the main survival structure in nature. Zoospores are capable of long-term survival but do not play a significant role in the disease cycle because sexual reproduction requires the presence of opposite mating types, and the chance for this to occur in nature is very low.

During rainy periods, chlamydospores in soil may germinate in water to produce sporangia and release zoospores. The impact of falling rain drops may splash zoospores into air in droplets. The zoospore-containing droplets may be further dispersed by wind and become the inoculum for infecting fruit and occasionally stems of papaya in the fields. The pathogen produces abundant sporangia on the surface of infected fruit that are further dispersed by wind-blown rain and cause outbreaks of Phytophthora fruit rot in the same and nearby orchards. Chlamydospores formed in fallen fruit survive in soil and serve as the main source of inoculum for infection of roots of papaya seedling in subsequent plantings.

Phytophthora root rot of papaya seedlings is most serious during rainy periods. Under waterlogged conditions, P. palmivora may attack roots of papaya older than three-months of age, the time at which they become resistant to the pathogen under normal conditions. Therefore, Phytophthora root rot may occur on papaya at any age in poorly drained areas. Waterlogged conditions appear to weaken the defense mechanism of papaya roots against invasion by the pathogen. Mobility of zoospores of P. palmivora under such conditions also may contribute to the severity of the disease due to their attraction by papaya roots.

Favorable temperature is also a contributing factor to the severity of Phytophthora diseases because of its effect on growth and sporulation of the pathogen. P. palmivora has an optimum temperature for growth of 30 °C (86 °F), a maximum temperature of 36 °C (97 °F) and a minimum temperature of 12 °C (54 °F). The pathogen produces the most sporangia at 25 °C (77 °F) but no sporangia are produced at temperatures higher than 35 °C (95 °F) or lower than 15 °C (59 °F).

A 2024 study reported that P. palmivora are attracted to plant roots by the weak electrical field they emit and that an applied electrical field can attract them more strongly, providing some protection for the plants.

== Hosts and symptoms ==
Although the common name of Phytophthora palmivora is bud rot of palms, and its Latin name means "plant destroyer" and "palm eater", it affects many tropical plants and has a moderately broad host range. P. palmivora is well studied in coconuts and papaya trees, however there are multiple hosts that are less commonly studied. One common symptom of P. palmivora is fruit rots which are found in papaya, citrus, coconuts, durian, and cacao. Root rots are another symptom of P. palmivora and can be seen in red maples, citrus, papaya, mango, durian, and black pepper. Another symptom is the presence of cankers which are found in red maple, papaya, rubber, mangos, and cacao. Bud rots can also be seen in papaya and coconuts infected with P. palmivora. Bud rots are also found in Palmyra palms and coconut palms. Collar rots are found on citrus, mango, and black pepper infected with P. palmivora. The signs of P. palmivora are microscopic and can be differentiated from other oomycetes by the presence of oval shaped papillate sporangia with short pedicles and spherical oogonia with narrow stalks (Widmer, 2014).

== Epidemiology ==
Rain and wind are the two major factors in the epidemiology of Phytophthora fruit rot of papaya. Rain splash is needed for liberation of sporangia of P. palmivora from the surface of infected fruit into the atmosphere and for projection of the soil inoculum into air. Wind is required for dispersal of the inoculum once it reaches the air. Therefore, wind-blown rain is essential for initiation of the primary infection and the development of epidemics in papaya orchards. P. palmivora also cause fruit rot, bud rot, etc. in coconut. Bud rot of coconut (Cocos nucifera) is very common in India.

Atmospheric temperature of 18–20 °C (64–68 °F) along with high humidity activates the pathogen.

== Management ==
=== General control ===
Since P. palmivora is an oomycete the simplest management technique is to control the amount of water present in the soil. Techniques for controlling moisture include: monitored watering, pruning to increase airflow and decrease humidity in the soil, as well as making sure that areas where potential hosts are planted are not prone to flooding, oftentimes this includes planting on an incline. Other means of cultural control for P. palmivora include mulching to reduce the number of spores released via rain splash, complete removal of infected host plants and materials, and in some cases the use of companion crops. Companion crops are planted in the same fields as the host plant and are used to divert some of the pathogen away from the hosts, an example being planting bananas and avocados in the same field. Chemical control methods for P. palmivora include: protectant fungicides such as the Bordeaux mixture, phosphonates which control the mycelial growth of the pathogen, dithiocarbamates such as Mancozeb, and phenylamides which control the spread of the pathogen from the roots of the host. Host resistance is also a method of controlling the pathogen, resistant plants generally have thicker cuticles which inhibits the ability of the pathogen to enter the host.

=== Non-chemical control in papaya ===
Root rot of papaya seedlings, caused by P. palmivora, in replant fields can be controlled with the virgin soil technique. Virgin soil (soil in which papaya has never been grown in before) is placed in planting holes about 30 cm (12 in) in diameter and 10 cm (3.9 in) deep with a mound about 4 cm (1 9/16 in) high. Roots of papaya plants are protected by the virgin soil during the susceptible stage, and become resistant to the pathogen when they extend to the infested soil. Trees established with the virgin soil method in the replant fields produce fruit as abundantly as those growing in the first planting fields. The virgin soil method has the advantages of being relatively inexpensive, very effective and nonhazardous.

Cultural practice is also important in the management of Phytophthora diseases of papaya. Incidence of Phytophthora root rot of mature trees in waterlogged areas during the rainy periods can be greatly reduced by improving drainage in the orchards. Infected fruit on the trees and those that have fallen to the ground should be removed to reduce the inoculum for aerial infection of fruit and stems, and infection of seedling roots in subsequent plantings.

=== Genetic management ===
Medicago spp. including alfalfa may be resistant. Wang et al., 2012 discovers an alfalfa mutant ram2 with impaired glycerol-3-phosphate acyltransferase. This impairs its own cutin formation but also provides resistance because P. palmivora uses its products as a virulence signal. P. palmivora suffers disrupted appressorial development due to its failure to receive as much of this signal.

== Importance ==
Because P. palmivora infects multiple hosts that hold an economic significance including cacao, coconut, papaya, mango, olive trees, and black pepper, this is a pathogen of great concern. The pathogen is found in various regions of the planet ranging from Africa, India, South America, and even the temperate regions of North America. It has been estimated that 10-20% of all cacao is lost due to Phytophthora Pod Rots (PPR) which includes P. palmivora. Due to P. palmivora’s dependence on moisture, the annual yield loss fluctuates and in some years losses have been as high as 75% in some regions. This impacts the cost of cacao, and thus the pathogen controls the cost and availability of products such as chocolate. In mangoes, the pathogen is known to kill young plants, specifically nursery plants. This impacts the long-term number of commercially available plants which could lead to potentially lower crop yields. In coconuts, the expected yield losses caused by P. palmivora have been up to 2.5% per month during the rainy season, this can impact coconut product manufacturing such as coconut oil. In the 1970s P. palmivora had such a severe impact on black pepper plants in Brazil that it was no longer commercially grown, and it is considered the most detrimental pathogen of black pepper. As previously stated impacts of P. palmivora commercially cause it to be a pathogen of significant importance.
