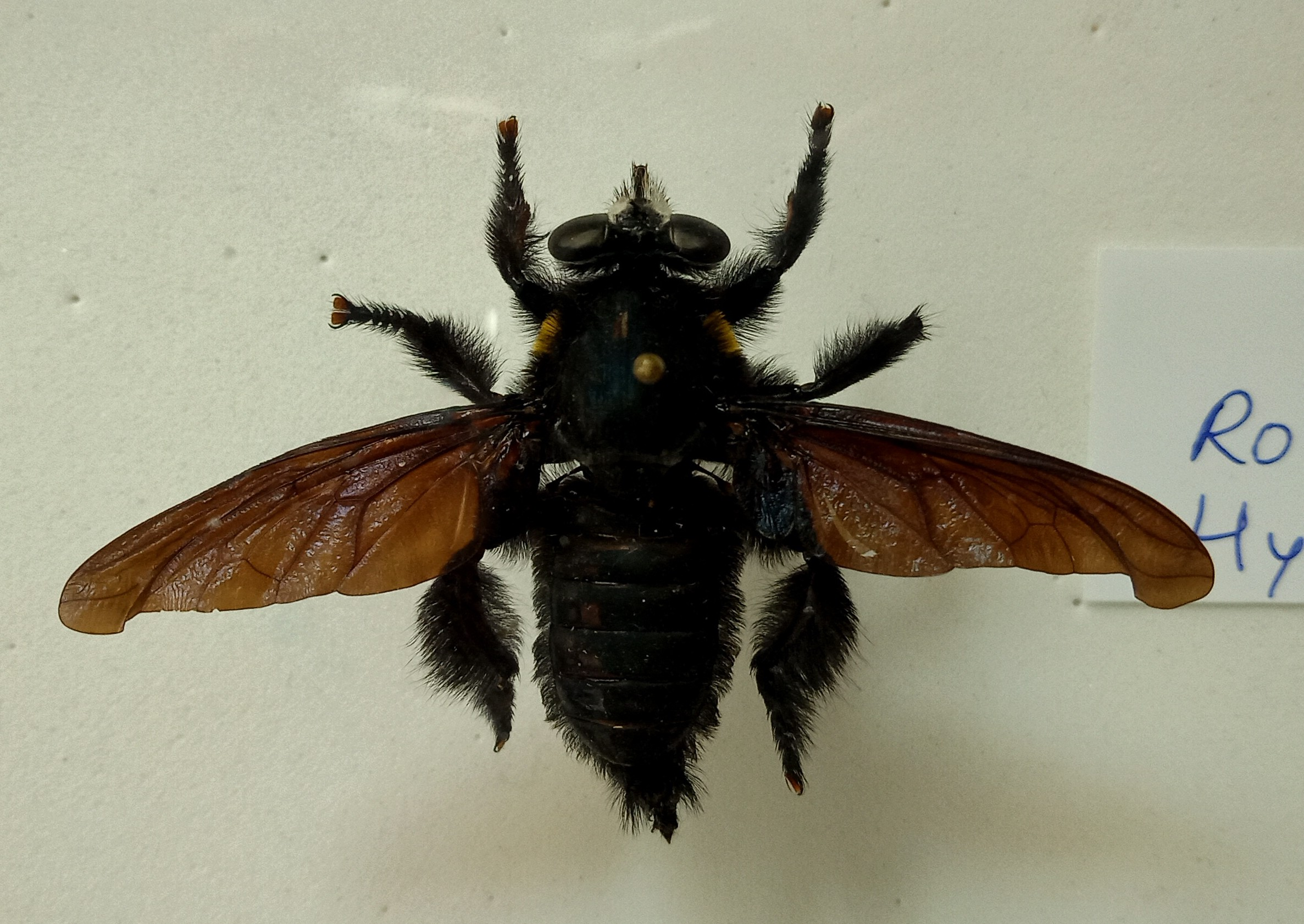

Scientific classification
- Kingdom: Animalia
- Phylum: Arthropoda
- Clade: Pancrustacea
- Class: Insecta
- Order: Diptera
- Family: Asilidae
- Genus: Hyperechia
- Species: H. xylocopiformis

Binomial name
- Hyperechia xylocopiformis (Walker, 1849)

Synonyms
- Laphria xylocopiformis Walker, 1849

= Hyperechia xylocopiformis =

Species of insect

Hyperechia xylocopiformis is a species of robber fly found in India and Sri Lanka. Like other species of Hyperechia they mimic the Xylocopa species of carpenter bees. The type specimen was collected by Walter Elliot from Madras and described by Francis Walker. The larvae live in the nests of carpenter bees and feed on their larvae while adults prey on wasps and bees including carpenter bees.

== Description ==
The fly has a bronze-black body with a purple glossy shine with black hair. The head will be black and crown of the head would have white hair in the front and long black hair around it. The sides of the thorax shows long black hairs and a tuft of bright yellow hair in front of the wings. It has strong hairy legs with black and bluish-purple wings.

== Behavior ==
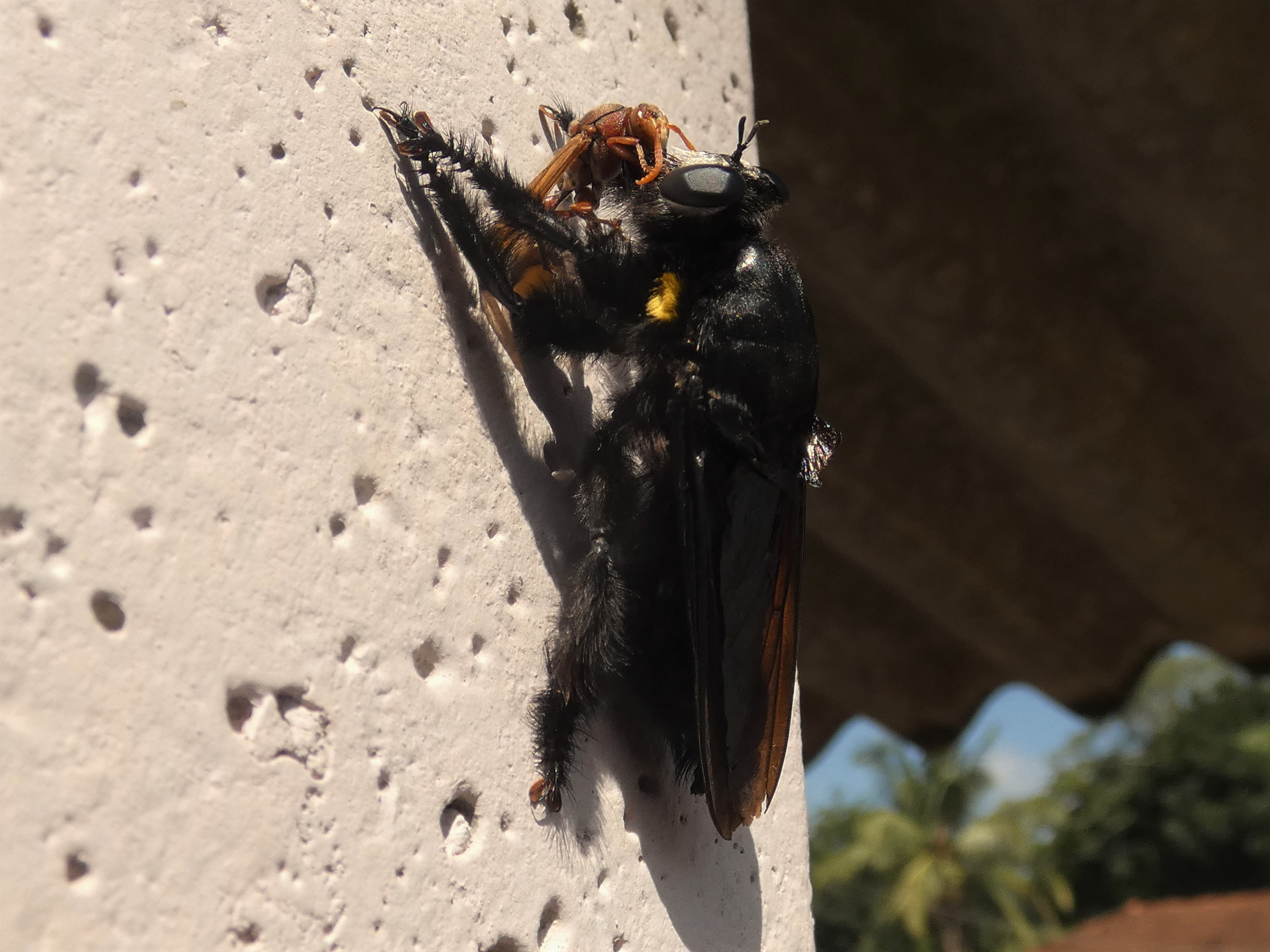
With a paper wasp prey

The larval feeding behavior of Hyperechia species recorded by naturalists from Africa in 1924 showed that the larva tunnels next to the nests of Xylocopa species. However V. G. L. van Someren discovered in 1924 that the Hyperechia larvae in fact prey on the Xylocopa species. Further in February 1925, Kunhikannan shared his unpublished observation from 1911 where he witnessed Hyperechia larvae feeding inside the nest of Xylocopa tenuiscapa species in Bangalore. Later in August 1925, Kunhikannan collected various stages of Hyperechia xylocopiformis and sent them to Entomological Society of London. V. G. L. van Someren also reconfirmed his observations from Nairobi. This led to establishing the fact that Hyperechia xylocopiformis larvae actually feed on Xylocoha larvae by tunnelling into their hosts nest.

The adults of this species have been observed preying on the adult of Xylocopa species. It was also recorded preying on Ropalidia brevita, a species of paper wasp.

== Distribution ==
This species has been recorded from the states of Kerala, Karnataka and from Tamil Nadu, where it was first collected.
