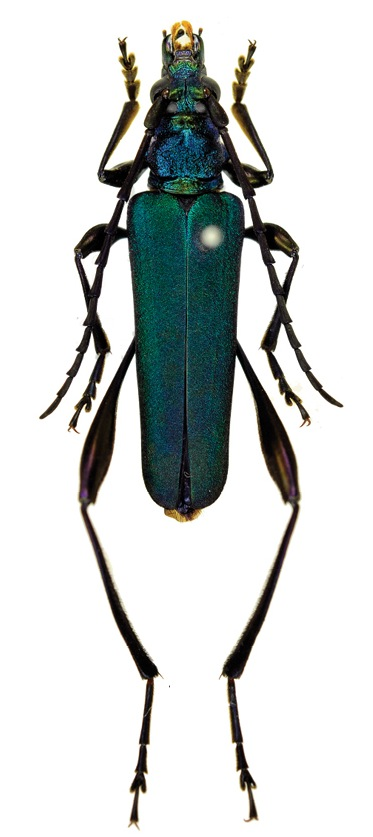
- Chelidonium violaceimembris

Scientific classification
- Domain: Eukaryota
- Kingdom: Animalia
- Phylum: Arthropoda
- Class: Insecta
- Order: Coleoptera
- Suborder: Polyphaga
- Infraorder: Cucujiformia
- Family: Cerambycidae
- Tribe: Callichromatini
- Genus: Chelidonium; Thomson, 1864

Type species
- Cerambyx argentatus Dalman, 1817

= Chelidonium (beetle) =

Genus of beetles

Chelidonium is a genus of long-horned beetles with about twenty known species distributed mainly in Asia. The larvae of most species in the genus bore into trees in the citrus family.

The genus is differentiated from Aphrodisium and Chloridolum by the rounded (untoothed) apex to the scape or base of antenna. Polyzonus also has a rounded scape but it does not have laterally compressed hind tarsi and the antennal segments are toothed from the 5th segment onwards in Chelidonium while in Polyzonus, they are toothed from the 6th segment onwards. The body is slender and cylindrical in Chelidonium and the pronotum lacks any median protrusions and has a central shiny longitudinal line. The shape of the aedeagus is used to differentiate it from the genera Schwarzerium and Anubis. Species in the genus include:

- Chelidonium argentatum (Dalman, 1817)
- Chelidonium binotaticolle
- Chelidonium boessnecki
- Chelidonium bryanti
- Chelidonium buddleiae
- Chelidonium cheongae (Bentanachs & Drouin, 2013)
- Chelidonium cinctum
- Chelidonium citri
- Chelidonium hefferni
- Chloridolum nadleri Skale, 2018
- Chelidonium nepalense
- Chelidonium obscurum
- Chelidonium punctigerum (Pascoe, 1869)
- Chelidonium purpureipes Gressitt, 1939
- Chelidonium semivenereum
- Chelidonium sifanicum
- Chelidonium venereum
- Chelidonium viktora
- Chelidonium violaceimembris
- Chelidonium zaitzevi
