= Narasimhella =

Scientific classification
- Kingdom: Fungi
- Division: Ascomycota
- Class: Eurotiomycetes
- Order: Onygenales
- Family: Gymnoascaceae
- Genus: Narasimhella; Thirum. & P.N.Mathur (1966)

Type species
- Narasimhella poonensis Thirum. & P.N.Mathur (1966)

Genus of fungi

Narasimhella is a genus of fungi in the family Gymnoascaceae.

The genus name of Narasimhella is in honour of Mandayam Jeersannidhi Narasimhan (1891–1970), who was a pioneering Indian plant pathologist and mycologist who worked in the state of Mysore.

The genus was circumscribed by Mandayani Jeersannidhi Thirumalachar and P.N.Mathur in Sydowia vol.19 on page 184 in 1966.
