= Leslie Coleman =

Canadian virologist, entomologist and phytopathologist

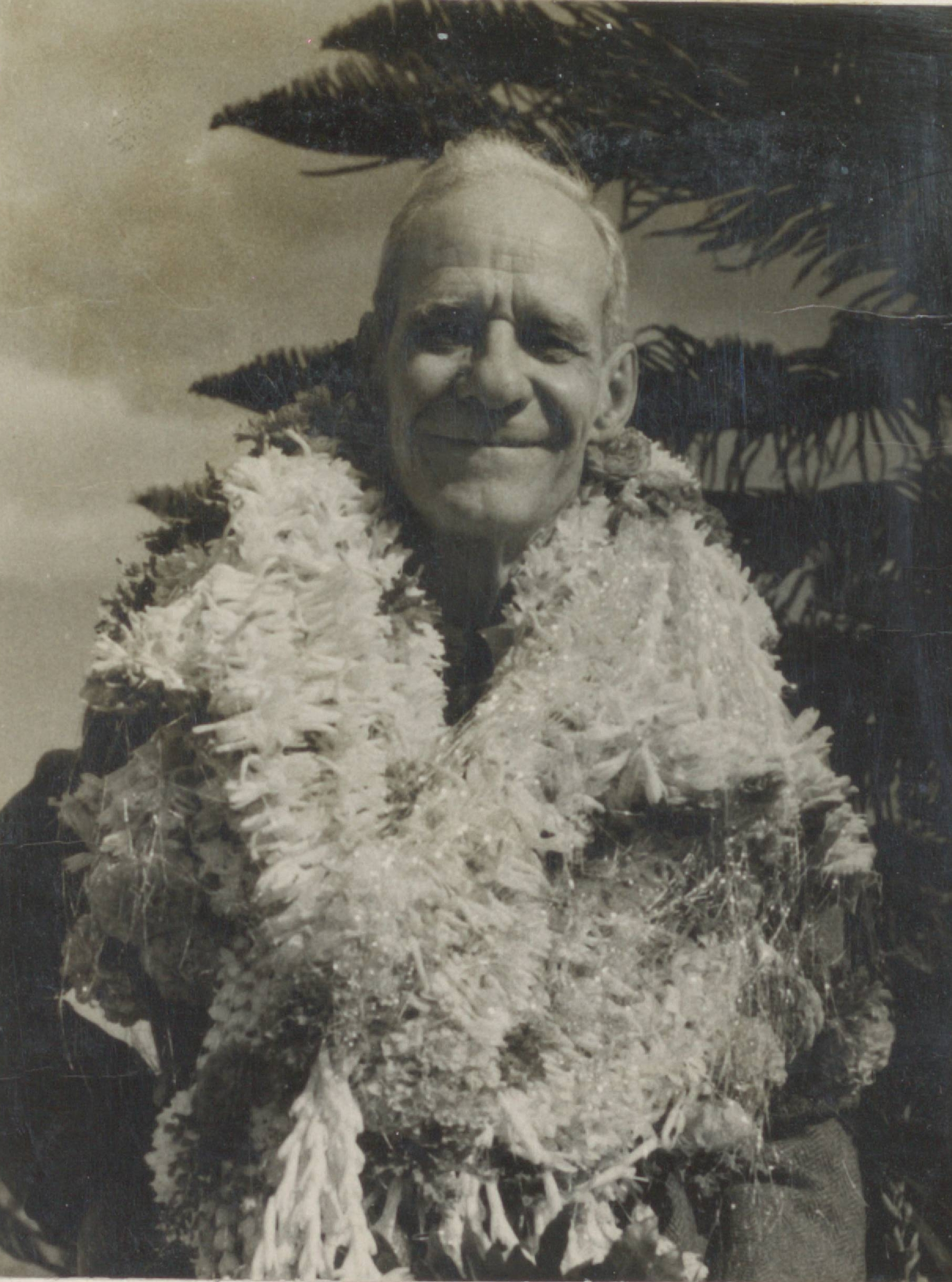
- Coleman with garlands on his 1953 visit to India
- Born: Leslie Charles Coleman; June 16, 1878
- Died: September 14, 1954 (aged 76)
- Scientific career
- Fields: agricultural entomology, pest management, plant pathology

Leslie Charles Coleman CIE (16 June 1878 – 14 September 1954) was a Canadian entomologist, plant pathologist and virologist who worked as the first director of agriculture in Mysore State in southern India. He conducted pioneering research on the pests and diseases affecting agriculture in the region and was instrumental in establishing several agricultural research and educational institutions including the Hebbal Agricultural School which later became a part of the University of Agricultural Sciences, Bangalore and the Coffee Research Station at Balehonnur which became the Central Coffee Research Institute. He introduced improved tillage implements, sprayers, tractors, and played a key role in the establishment of the Mysore Sugar Company in Mandya. His major contributions to plant protection included measures to control a rot disease of coffee caused by Pellicularia koleroga (now Ceratobasidium noxium) known in southern India as koleroga. Coleman established measures for koleroga, a generic name for rot-causing diseases in Kannada, that caused complete destruction in areca plantations. Sprays of inexpensive Bordeaux mixture on the growing crowns helped control infection caused by what he described as Phytophthora arecae (now considered as Phytophthora palmivora).

== Early life ==
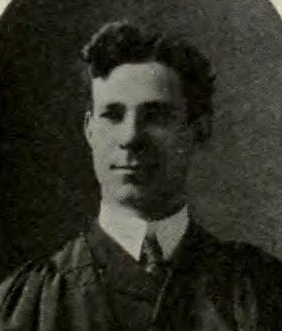
Leslie Coleman as a graduate in 1904

Leslie Coleman was born in Durham County, Ontario, Canada, on 16 June 1878 to Elizabeth Ann née Beer and Francis T. Coleman. He had three brothers and two sisters. The family appears to have moved between Toronto and Spokane, Washington, as Coleman went to the Arthur High School and Harbord Collegiate Institute after which Leslie became a primary school teacher (following his brother Norman Frank Coleman who became a President of Reed College while another brother Herbert was principal of Spokane High School). In 1900 he joined the University of Toronto and graduated in science with a Governor General's Gold medal in 1904. Coleman spent the summer of 1904 at the marine research stations at Malpeque and at Georgian Bay where he studied oyster cultivation. He also trained at the Bureau of Entomology in 1905. He received the Frederick Wyld Prize for English Essay in 1905. He moved to Germany for further study and obtained a doctorate from the University of Göttingen. Here he studied nitrification by soil bacteria. He trained in mycology under Heinrich Klebahn. From 1906, he worked at the Kaiser Wilhelm Institute for Agriculture and Forestry in Berlin for two years before he obtained a five-year appointment as Mycologist and Entomologist in the State of Mysore in India in 1908.

== India ==
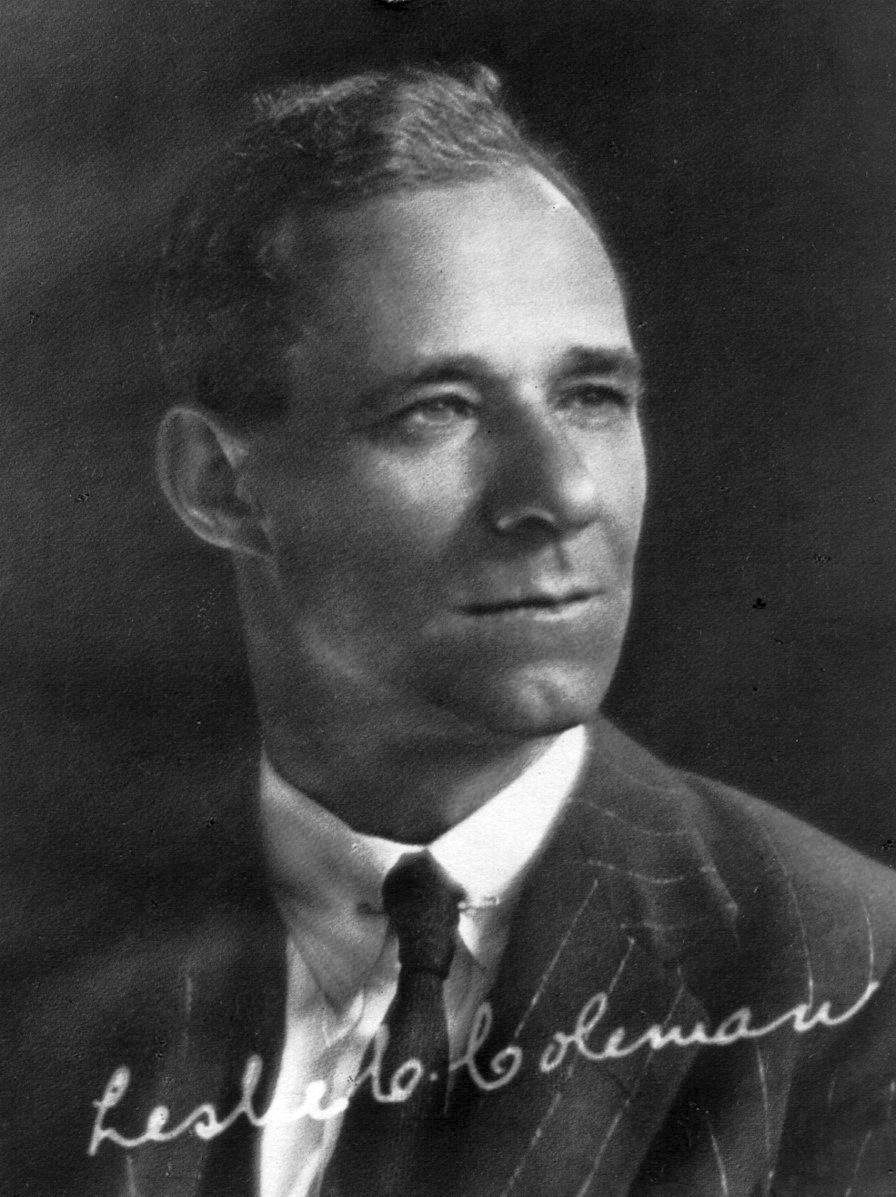
Carte-de-visite

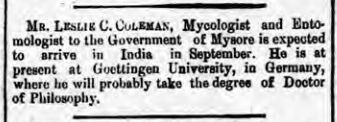
News report on Coleman's arrival. The Bombay Gazette, 27 June 1907

Coleman joined as an entomologist in the agricultural research establishment begun in the State of Mysore by Adolf Lehmann, a Canadian chemist of German descent. Lehmann's appointment as a chemist had followed from the recommendations of the committee headed by Dr J.A. Voelcker to improve agriculture in India and while Lehmann's focus had been on soil fertility but he felt the need for a qualified plant protection expert. Shortly after Coleman's arrival the government of Mysore decided not to renew Lehmann's contract and following the death of his wife, wished to return to Canada. From 1908, Coleman then had to take over management of the chemistry department of the Mysore Agricultural Department while also studying crop pests and diseases. Early studies included the ring disease of potato. The chemist H. V. Krishnayya who had served from Lehmann's time continued to serve as chemist for both the geology and agriculture departments. In 1912, he wrote on agronomic experiments conducted on traditional paddy varieties and their cultivation techniques at the Hebbal research farms. At the 1912 Dasara exhibition in Mysore, Coleman organized an exhibit of insect pests and measures for their management which proved to be immensely popular.

=== Director of agriculture ===
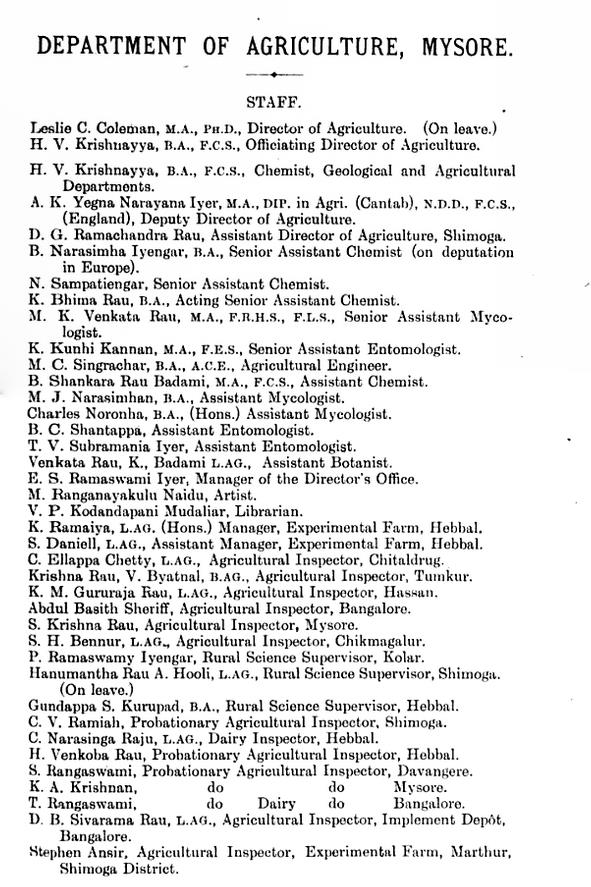
Staff of the agriculture department in 1916

Coleman's five year contract was due to expire on January 7, 1913 and it was reviewed and the government passed a resolution to appoint him in permanent service as Director of Agriculture with a pay of Rs 1200 with annual increments of Rs 50 rising to Rs 1400. An earlier allowance of Rs 75 sanctioned for additionally being in charge of the Agricultural Chemistry Department was abolished. Coleman held the position of director until 1934 with breaks between 1925 and 1928.

=== Agricultural education, research, and outreach ===
One of his first tasks was the establishment of the Hebbal Agricultural School which began in July 1913. He served as its founding principal. This was followed by the establishment of three vernacular agricultural schools at Chikkanhalli, Hassan, and Ramakrishnapur established on land donated by farmers for the purpose. During Coleman's tenure research was conducted by the agriculture department but he foresaw the role of a university as the centre for research. The school at Hebbal later became the Agricultural College at Hebbal in Bangalore (on 14 June 1946) and in 1964 became a part of the University of Agricultural Sciences, Bangalore. Another innovation was the establishment of the Mysore Agricultural and Experimental Union in 1918, consisting of land owning cultivators interested in carrying out experiments and scientific investigations on new methods, conduct manure and crop trials just like the government experimental farms while also popularising new ideas among farmers. A field day was held once a year in November. The Union was based on a similar idea in Ontario and published a quarterly journal in English (Journal of the Mysore Agricultural Experimental Union now called the Mysore Journal of Agricultural Sciences) and a Kannada monthly.

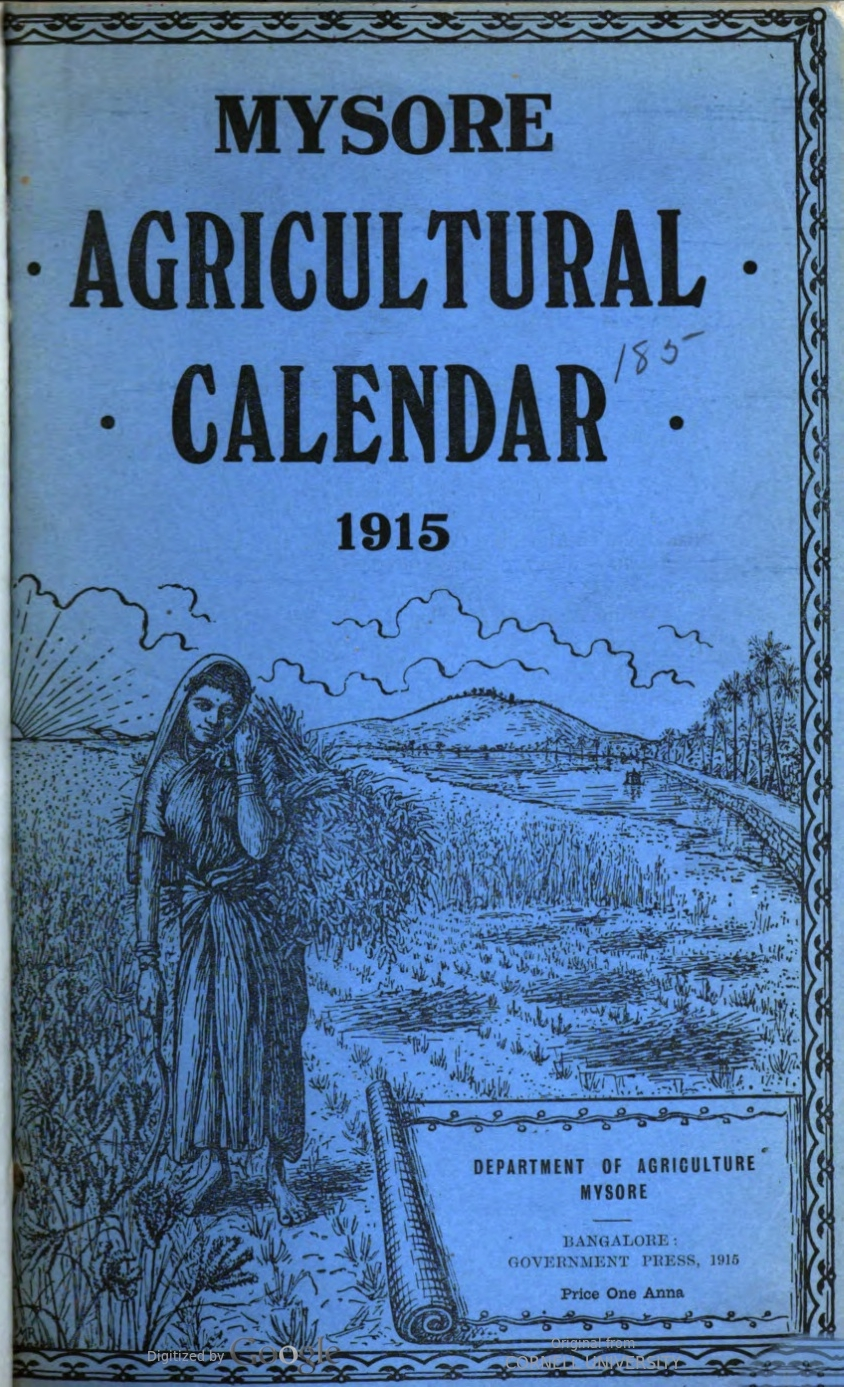
Cover of the Mysore Agricultural Calendar one of several publications issued by the agriculture department

Coleman showed a keen interest in matters of policy and administration from an early period. In 1918, Coleman spoke at the Mysore Economic Conference on the Japanese approach to consolidation of small farmer holdings to reduce wastage of land for boundaries and noted that such an idea would be difficult to implement in India due to the Hindu laws of inheritance. He examined the kinds of changes in Indian agriculture that could be easily mediated and accepted by Indian farmers in the longer term. He pointed out that spreading good practices and efficient instruments from one region to another as an effective exercise and favoured the spread of selections of crop varieties to the use of hybrids.

=== World War I ===
From January 1919 to July, Coleman taught biology to Canadian army personnel returning from the First World War in a makeshift training centre in Ripon, Yorkshire. This six month course at the Khaki University was accepted by Canadian universities as equal to a full year of coursework. Coleman reflected on his experience in education in this setup in a Mysore University publication noting how the lack of a proper building hardly affected the aim of providing education.

=== Sericulture and the Civil Veterinary Department ===
In 1920 Coleman was given the added responsibility of administration of the department of sericulture (but moved back under the director of industries and commerce in 1923), the Civil Veterinary and Amrut Mahal Departments was also placed under the care of his department. In order to assist him, Coleman recruited fellow-Canadian Wilfred Davison as livestock expert in 1920. Davison however resigned in 1925. Coleman oversaw the establishment of the Mysore Serum Institute to produce rinderpest vaccine was established at Hebbal between 1927 and 1930. He helped organized better silk reeling techniques and oversaw the establishment of the Mysore Silk Filature. A cattle breeding farm was established at Parvatrayanakere, Ajjampura in 1929.

=== Coffee research station ===
The Coffee Research Station at Balehonnur was established in 1925 with an original eighteen acres of coffee land and 18 acres of forest leased out by C.S. Crawford. The government added 14 acres of gomal (cattle grazing commons), and 165 acres of forest to it. Still later the government purchase Crawford's land and additional 65 acres to make up a total of 280 acres. Research was conducted here on coffee varieties, studies on pests and diseases. In the 1930s Coleman's personal research related to coffee included studies on the coffee rust, Hemileia vastatrix.

=== Areca and Koleroga ===
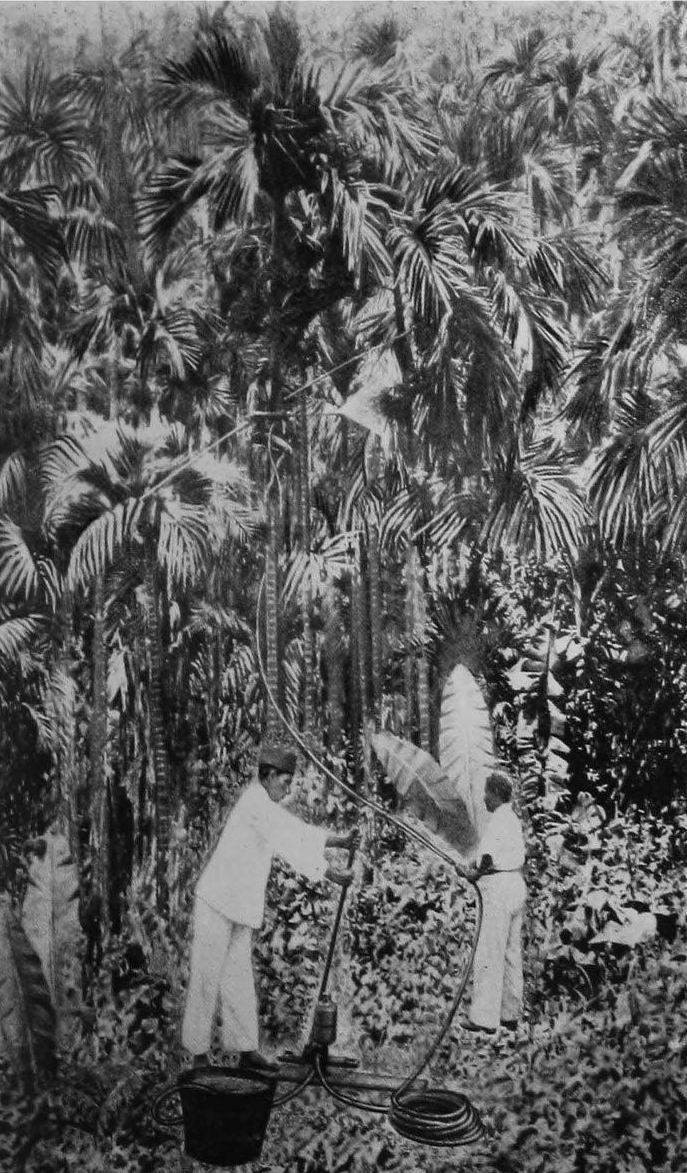
Sprayers for areca

Coleman's major work with the areca farmers was in the management of a major fungal disease of areca caused by multiple species of Phytophthora including Phytophthora palmivora (then called P. arecae). The outbreak of rot began following the rains and the traditional attempts to control them involved climbing the tree and tying what were locally called kotte, a rain protection for the nuts made from the bases of the fronds of the palm. This was a labour intensive process and still resulted in rotten nuts. Additionally the crown of the tree would get infected followed by death of the palm. Coleman experimented with and identified the well-known Bordeaux mixture as an inexpensive solution to control the spread of oospores during the monsoon. Farmers however needed to be trained on how to produce the mixture with careful pH measurement, and to apply it on the growing crown and base of the nuts just prior to the onset of the monsoon. Spray at a height however was a challenge and required new equipment, and Coleman went about organizing import subsidies on sprayers through the agriculture department.

=== Research administration ===
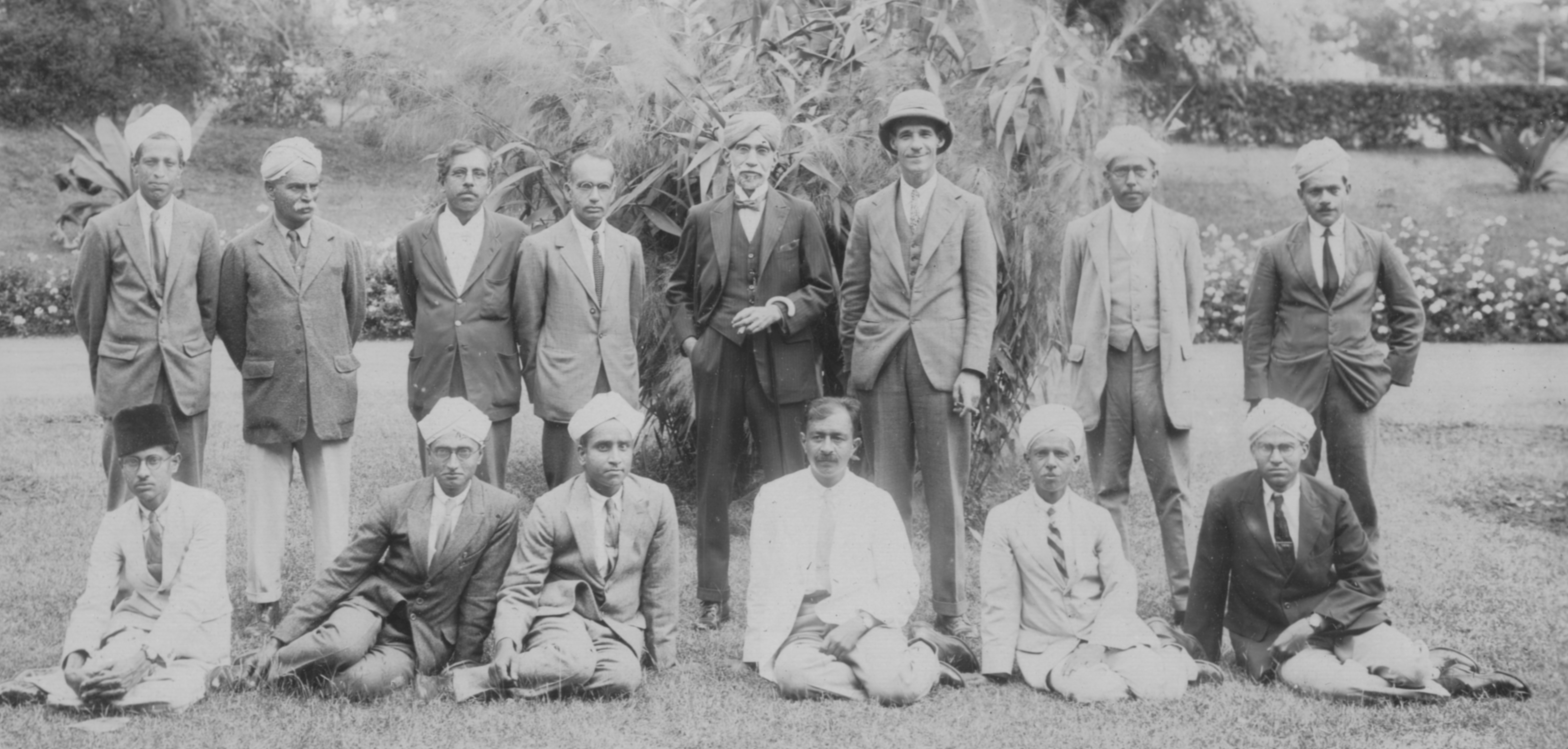
Agricultural scientists from Mysore taken sometime between 1928 and 1930. M. J. Narasimhan first from left, K. Kunhikannan, third from left, Coleman sixth from left, and H. V. Krishnayya seventh. V.K. Badami, sitting, fourth from left.

As a research administrator Coleman recruited and mentored the Indian entomologist K. Kunhikannan, the mycologist M. J. Narasimhan and several others who worked as assistants. Several of his research team were subsequently sent for training and higher education abroad. Coleman continued to take an interest in pathology and entomology research in spite his growing administrative duties. Around 1914, he studied a mycoplasma-like infection that affected sandal and caused sandal spike. Sandalwood spike was said to have spread around Hassan and Bangalore and 2418.5 tons of sandalwood were sold in that year as opposed to 2363 tons the previous year (and earning Rs 22,68,608) but the price per ton had doubled leading to serious economic concerns. In 1930 Coleman spent some time visiting Java. During this visit he examined the coffee berry borer (Hypothenemus hampei) which was suspected to have entered India. On his return he also suggested experiments on X-ray induced mutation for breeding new sugarcane varieties based on observations of similar attempts on tobacco at the Klaten Experimental Station in Java. These mutation experiments were then conducted by the geneticist and plant breeder Venkatrao K. Badami.

A grasshopper genus, Colemania and another species Parahieroglyphus colemani were named after him by Ignacio Bolívar. Coleman made an extensive study of Colemania sphenarioides, a pest in some regions that affected sorghum. The scale insect Coccus colemani found on coffee was named after him by his assistant entomologist Kunhi Kannan in 1918. Coleman was interested in the role of natural parasites and predators for the control of pests. In 1921 and 1933 he was involved in the introduction of Agromyzid flies (Ophiomyia lantanae) from Hawaii for the control of Lantana. The first laboratory for breeding parasites to help control sugarcane stem borer was established in 1935-36 at Mandya following research begun in 1933. The research involved the rearing and study of many species of parasites and in the process several new parasites were discovered with a few named after him - Telenomus colemani, Anastatus colemani, and Tetrastichus colemani. He took up measures to control Opuntia, particularly in Kolar district, that included manual removal, conversion into green manure, and attempts were also made to use scale/cochineal insects for their control.

=== Mechanization and modernization ===
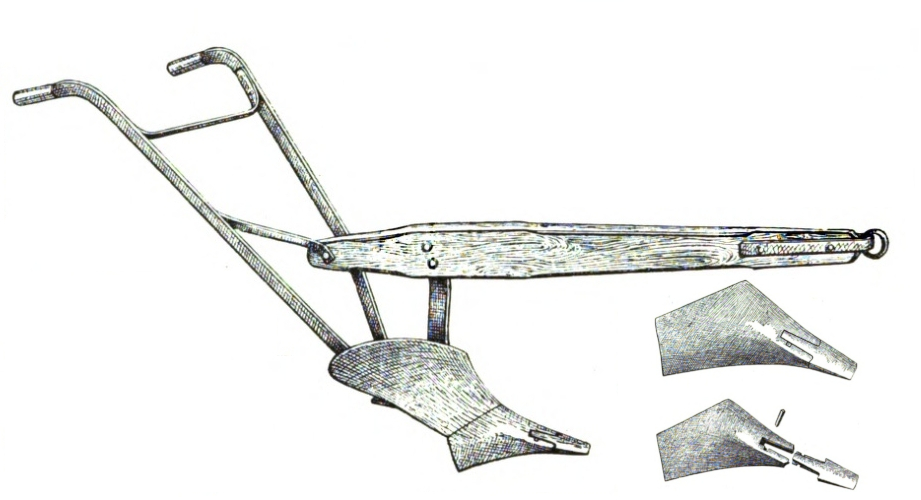
The Kolar Mission Plough

One of Coleman's earliest works was in the replacement of wooden ploughs with more modern versions which aimed to reduce the number of times a plough had to be passed across a field by one-fourth. He chose the Kolar mission plough imported from the United States by the Kolar Mission Institute and later had it modified and locally produced as the "Mysore plough". It was designed so that the fast-wearing tip of share was locally replaceable at a very low cost. The agriculture department stocked these implements and their spares in implements depots across the state and sold them to farmers at minimum cost.

=== Legislation and policy ===
Coleman also examined economic policies and was an advisor to many government bodies both in Mysore State and on deputation to the government of British India. Coleman was involved in the passing of the Diseases and Pests Act (1917), the first attempt in India to manage pests through legislation and was aimed at control of the white stem borer in coffee, a major export commodity from Mysore. The act made it compulsory for planters to take measures to control coffee stem-borer. Mass campaigns involving school children to collect hairy caterpillars for control were also a novel idea introduced by the department under his directorship.

As a member of the board of agriculture in India, Coleman headed various advisory committees and was responsible for approving the establishment of a dedicated statistical unit at the Imperial Agricultural Research Institute.

=== Mysore Sugar Company ===
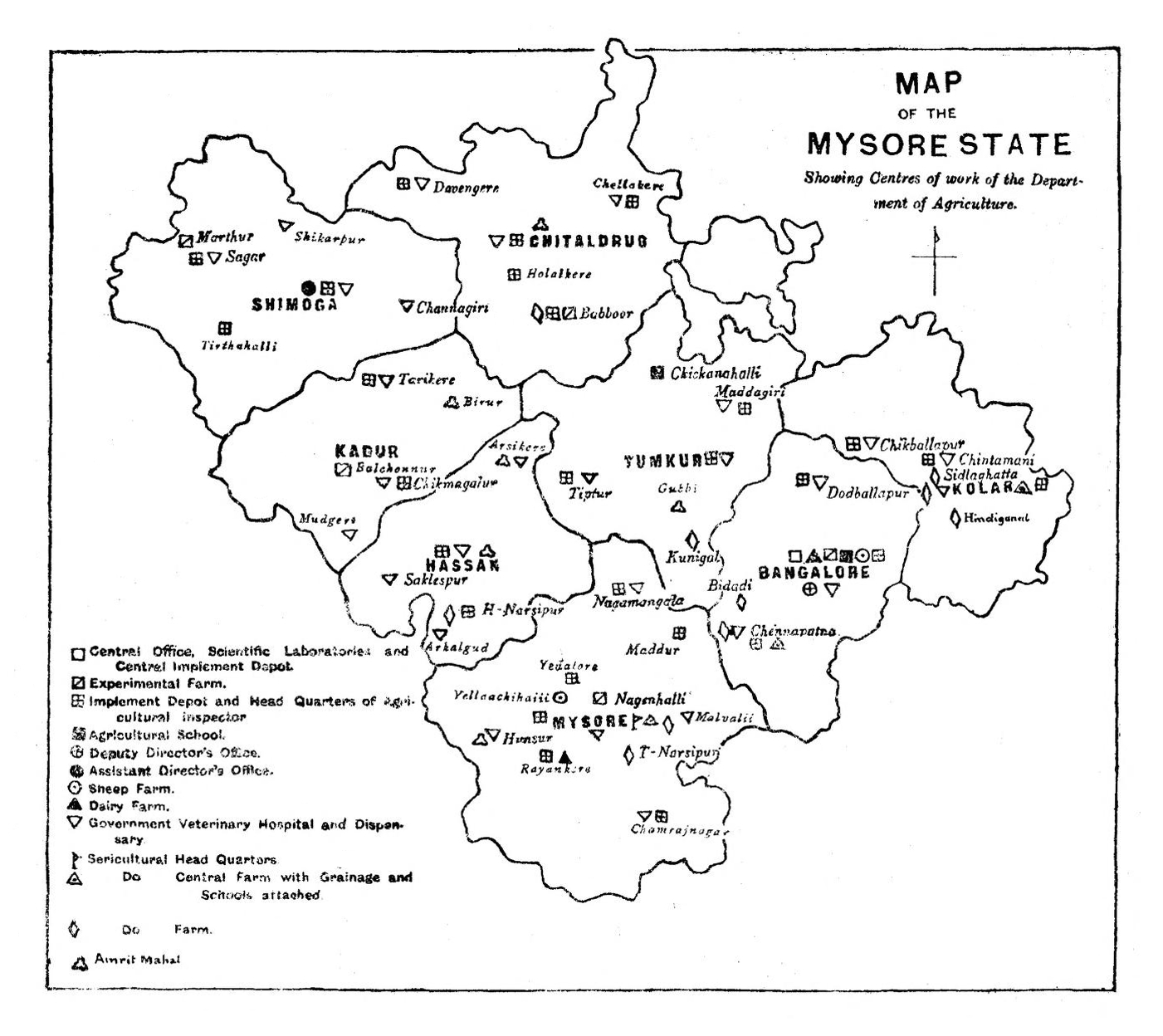
Map of agricultural establishments in Mysore, 1926

In 1933, Mysore Sugar Company (or Mysugar), the first joint-stock private company in India with the government as a majority shareholder was established to process sugar at the Mysore Sugar Factory (begun 15 January 1934) produced by sugarcane farmers in the (then called the Irwin canal, now Visveshwariah) canal irrigated region of Mandya. The farmers were contracted to sell all their produce through what was then a novel "oppige" (Kannada for agreement or contract, making it among the oldest examples of industrial "contract farming") system.

== Return to Canada ==
In 1925 Coleman briefly returned to Canada due to ill health to take up a position in the Toronto University department of botany. In 1927 a part-time position of plant pathologist in Ontario was created. He worked briefly on the dead arm of grapes caused by Cryptosporella viticola. Coleman did not continue for long and resigned to return to India. In 1929 he published a report on the work done in Mysore and how it compared with the recommendations made by the Royal Commission on Agriculture in India. Coleman was made Companion of the Order of the Indian Empire in 1931. After working for three more years in Mysore, Coleman retired, following repeated attacks of amoebic dysentery, from his position as Director of Agriculture. Returning to Canada he began to work at the University of Toronto, teaching and researching genetics. He worked on the cytology of Gasteria and Allium in 1936. In 1948 he studied the cytology of a grasshopper.

== India revisted ==
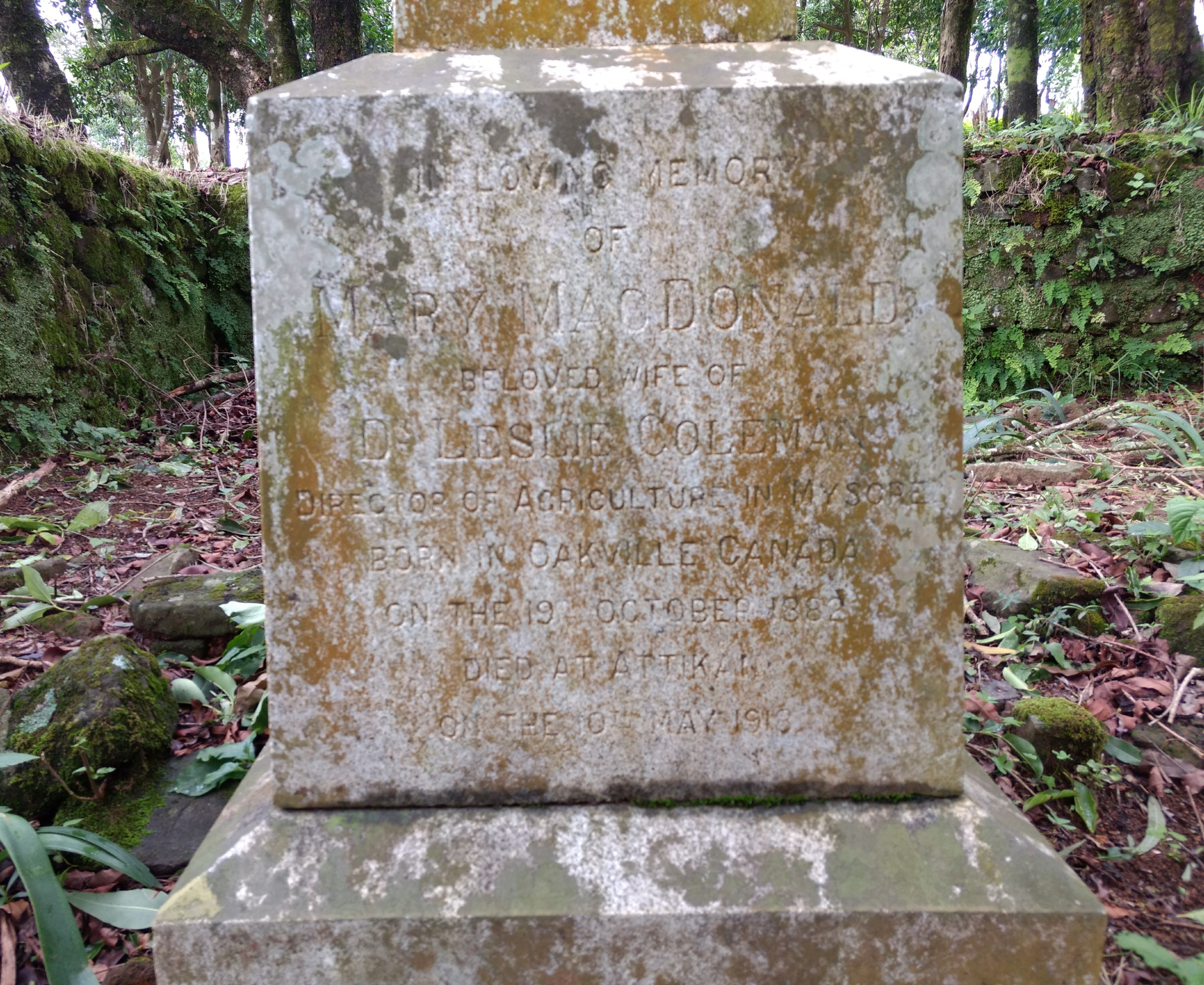
Memorial for Mary Macdonald at Bellaji, Biligirirangan Hills

Towards the end of 1953, Coleman visited Karnataka privately, but upon hearing of the visit, the then chief minister Kengal Hanumanthaiah declared him a state guest and organized a tour of Karnataka to examine the state of agriculture and to visit the places where he had worked. He was welcomed in the places where he worked, and attended a number of special events held in his honour. At the end of his trip he submitted a report of his observations and suggestions for improvement to agriculture. Shortly after returning to Canada in 1954, while driving to his lab in Saanichton through dense fog, his car hit a culvert and he was killed.

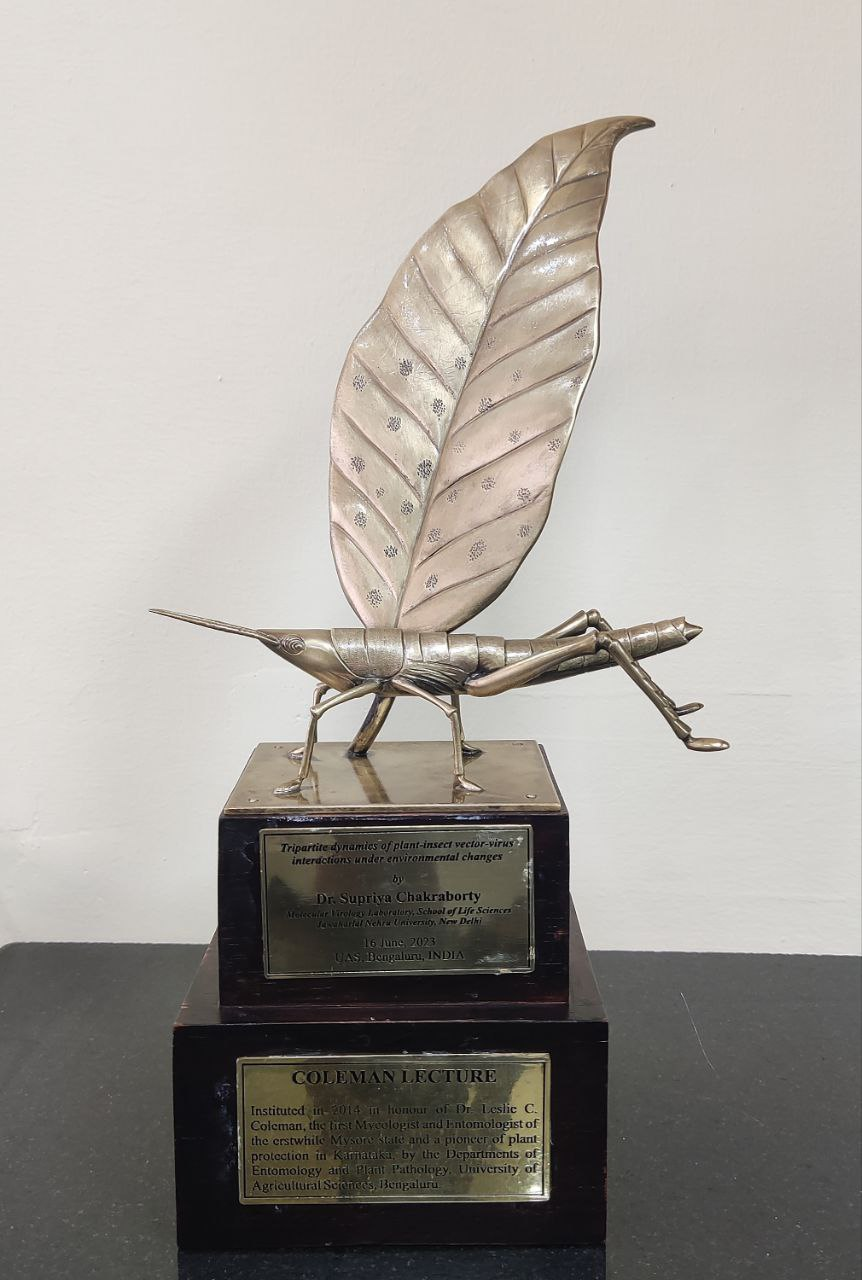
Memento given to speakers at the Coleman lecture with representations of Colemania and a leaf of coffee with rust

== Family and personal life ==
Coleman was married twice. His met his first wife Mary "May" MacDonald Urquhart (born Oct 19, 1882), daughter of a local physician, when she was a student at the University of Toronto and married her shortly before leaving for India. She died on May 10, 1918, in the Biligirirangan Hills from diabetes and was buried in the Attikan estate of R.C. Morris. They had a son John Urquhart Coleman (1909-1980) who became a physician. Coleman married Phebe Ropes (1890-1946), daughter of Willis H. Ropes of Danvers, Massachusetts, an artist trained in Boston, on 23 May 1923. They had two daughters Louisa (1925-?) and Ann (1935-2016); and a son, also Leslie (1926-2019), who became a professor of geology at the University of Saskatchewan.

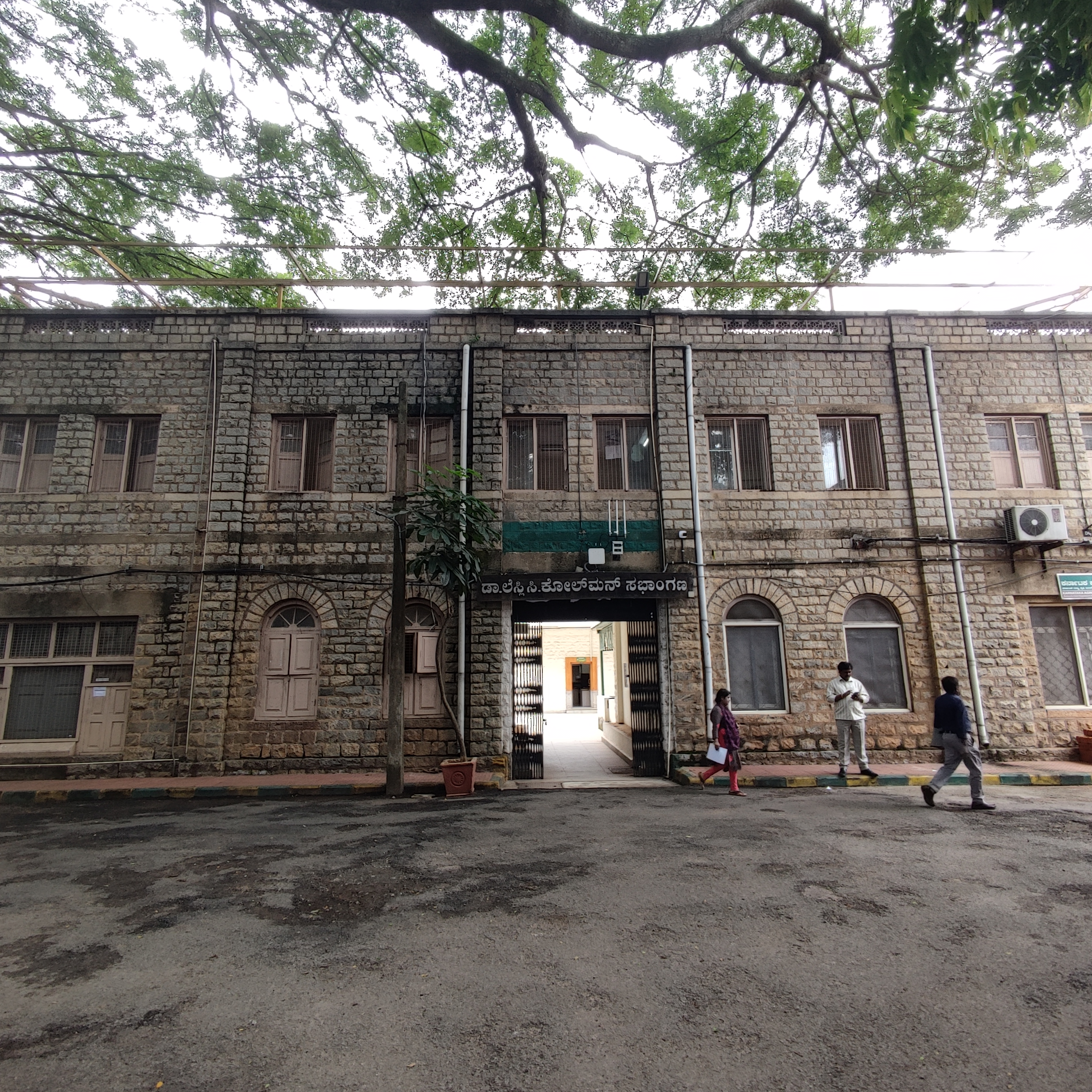
Coleman auditorium at the department of agriculture in Bangalore

Coleman was described as an agnostic by his son Leslie. He was critical of all religions and when invited to speak once at Victoria he declared that "reincarnation makes as much sense as the doctrine of the Virgin Birth".

== Memorials ==
A bust of Coleman stands inside the grounds of the Mysore Sugar Factory at Mandya. An entomology journal called Colemania was begun at the University of Agricultural Sciences in Bangalore but this did not survive long. The University of Agricultural Sciences in Bangalore instituted a Coleman memorial lecture in 2013, hosted by the departments of entomology and plant pathology, the talk is held annually on June 16, Coleman's birthday. In 2014, the memorial lecture was attended by Coleman's daughter Ann and her husband Tom Widdowson.

After the deaths of Ann and her brother Leslie, the family decided that photographs and papers relating to Coleman's life in India belonged in India. They are now held at the archives at the National Centre for Biological Sciences in Bangalore.
