= Venkata Rao K. Badami =

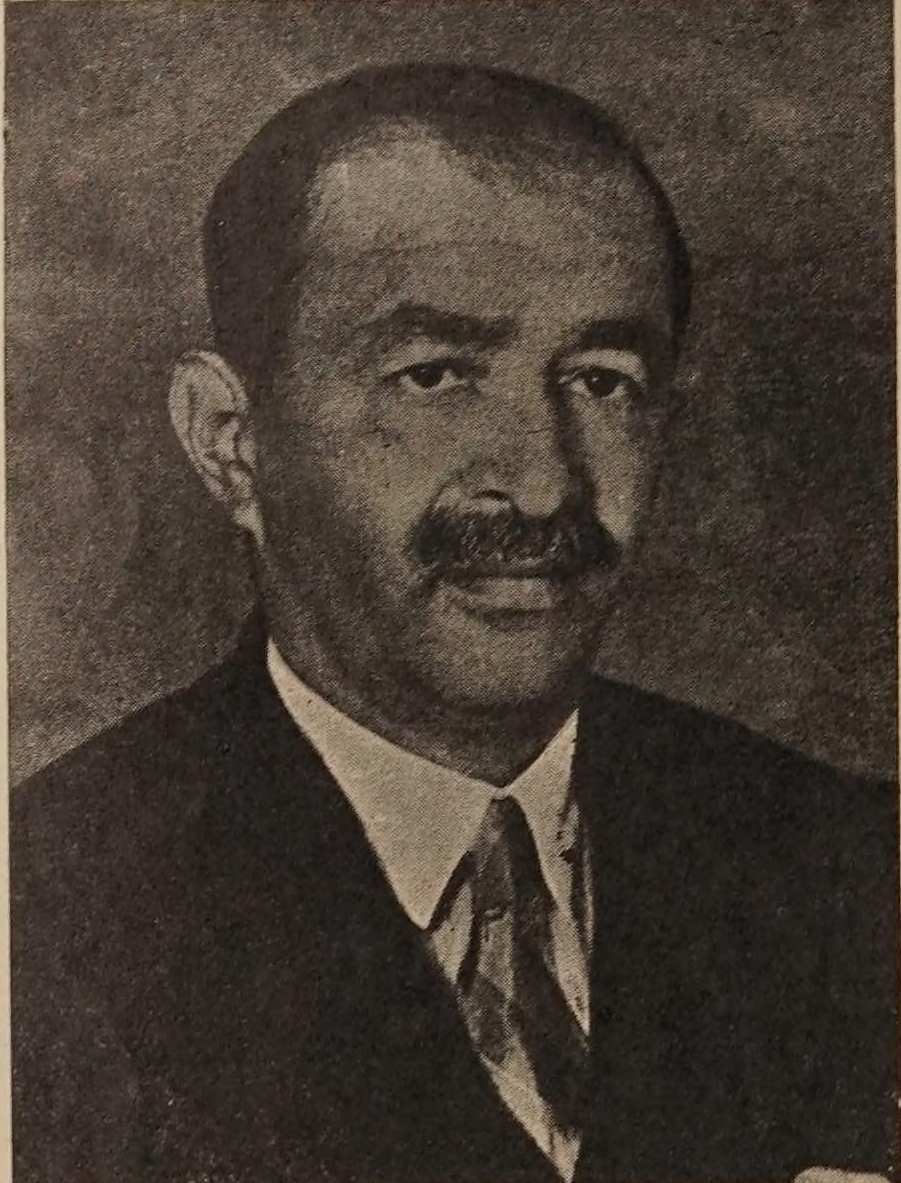

Venkata Rao Krishnaji Badami (12 January 1888 – 27 August 1946) was an Indian agronomist and a pioneer of plant breeding. Working in the Mysore Department of Agriculture, he was among the first to produce groundnut hybrids and to make use of X-ray induced mutations in the search for useful variations for breeding sugarcane varieties in 1933.

== Biography ==
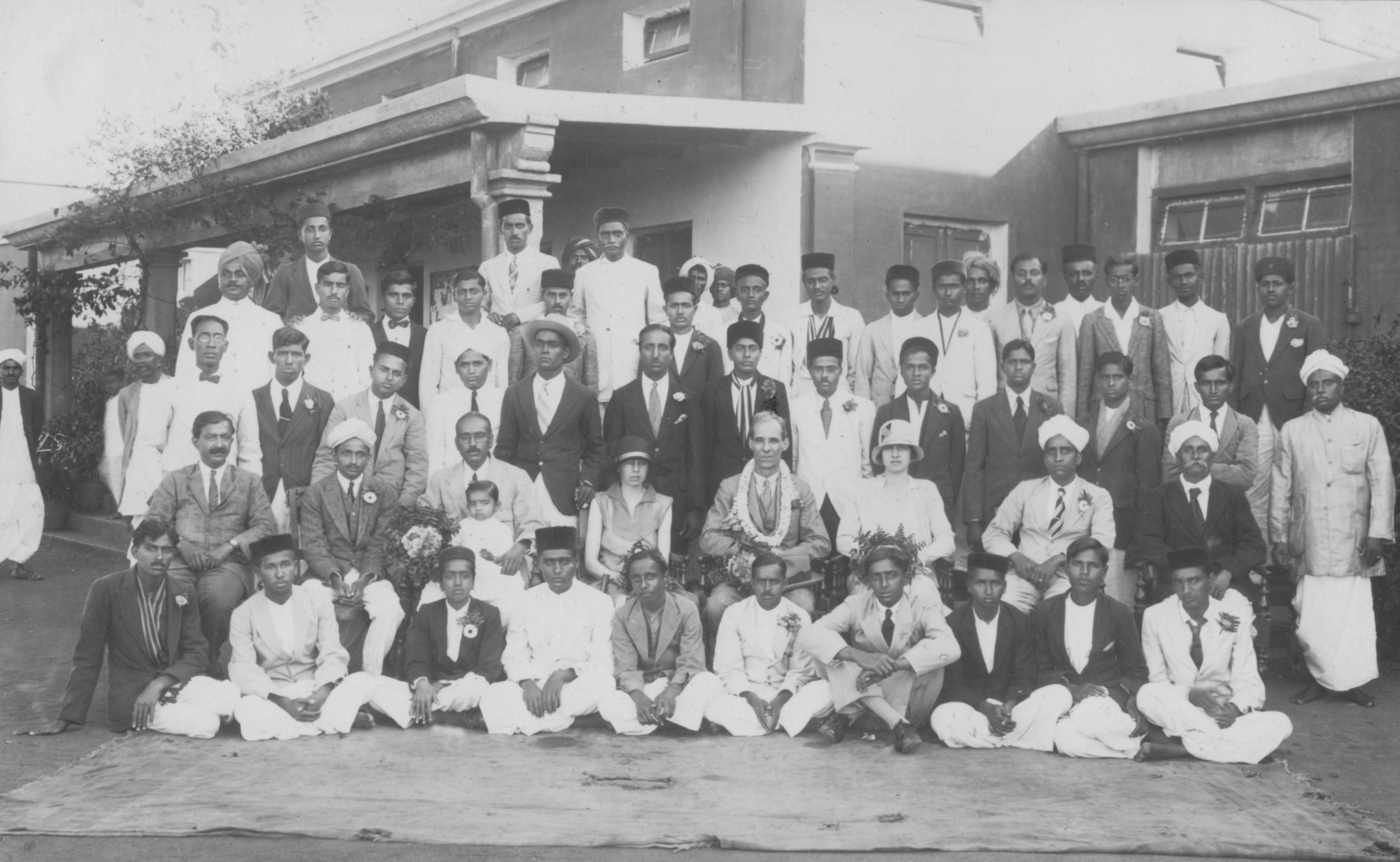
Badami seated leftmost as principal of the Hebbal agricultural college

Badami was born in Mysore, the third and youngest son of Badami Krishna Rao (1851–1937; son of Rao Bahadur Lakshman Rao, he translated Robinson Crusoe into Kannada). An older brother, B.K. Badami, became a veterinarian in Hyderabad. Venkatrao studied at Bangalore and Mysore before going to the College of Agriculture at Coimbatore in 1909. He joined the Mysore Agriculture Department in July 1913 under Leslie C. Coleman as a junior assistant botanist, and later served as the assistant principal of the Hebbal agricultural school. He was deputed for doctoral studies in Cambridge under Sir Rowland Biffen. His PhD thesis in 1929 was on "Inheritance studies in Arachis hypogaea (the groundnut)." He travelled around Europe and met Herman Nilsson-Ehle in Sweden and Wilhelm Johannsen in Denmark. He also interacted with C.A. Barber, Reginald Punnett and William Bateson and returned to India and was posted economic botanist in 1929, principal of the Hebbal agricultural school in 1931, and deputy director of agriculture from 1934. He helped produce the HM 320 and HM 544 varieties of sugarcane, S 661 paddy, conducted studies on selections, and bred many varieties of ragi (H 22) and groundnut (HG 1). After Coleman saw mutation breeding of tobacco at the Klaten Experimental Station in Java, Badami also undertook experiments on X-ray induced mutation of sugarcane. Various sugarcane mutants known as "mys-ray" were evaluated and some found to be useful. Similar experiments had failed elsewhere and Badami attributed his success to the use of seeds from homozygous sugarcane lines. He also examined the diversity of sandal trees. Sir John Russell, noted in his 1937 report on crop research in India that "Dr Badami is an ingenious investigator with a flair for this type of work. So long as he remains in charge some valuable results may be expected." Badami later served as deputy director of Agriculture for Orissa (c. 1942) and as principal of the Institute of Agricultural Research at the Benares Hindu University. He died in 1946.
