= M. J. Narasimhan =

Indian mycologist

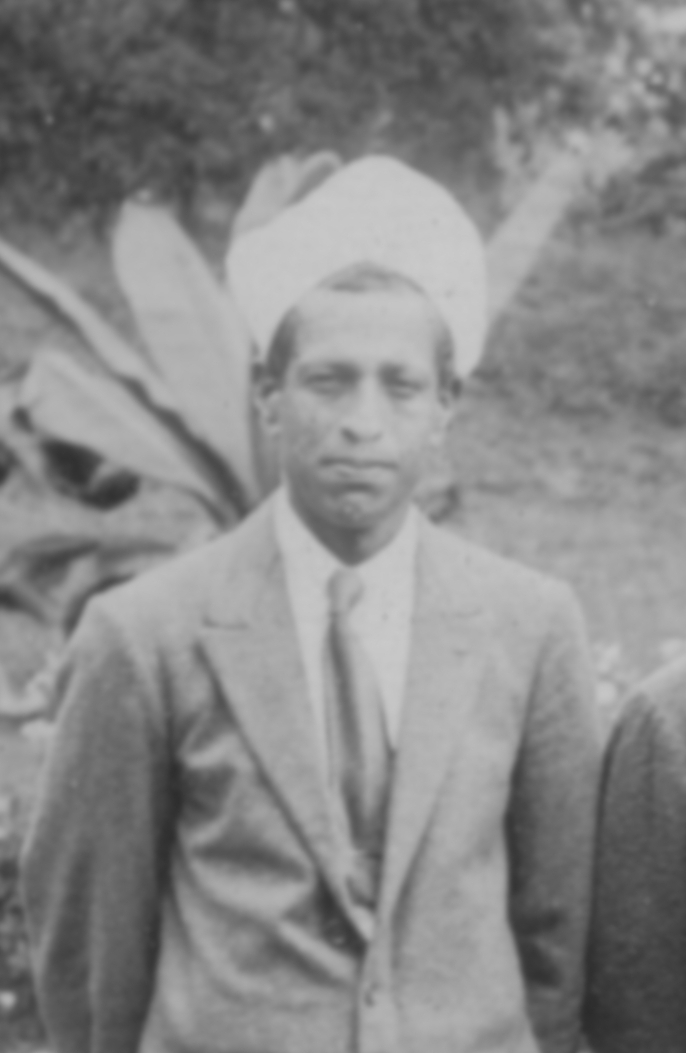
M.J. Narasimhan c. 1928

Mandayam Jeersannidhi Narasimhan (1 July 1891 – 24 September 1970) was a pioneering Indian plant pathologist and mycologist who worked in the state of Mysore.

Narasimhan was born in Madras in a family of scholars, with a grandfather who had collaborated with Max Müller. Narasimhan went to the Madras Presidency College, studying botany under P.F. Fyson, and was also influenced by his cousin M.O.P. Iyengar. He joined as an assistant mycologist under Leslie Coleman in 1913 in Mysore. He was involved in the studies of koleroga of arecanut. He also studied Hemileia vastatrix and its control in coffee. He retired in 1946 as director of agriculture in Mysore. A son, M.J. Thirumalachar also took to mycology and along with him he studied Sclerospora mildews and described the new genus Sclerophthora. The genera Narasimhania (Doassansiales) and Narasimhella (Gymnoascaceae) and the several species including Tilletia narasimhanii, Burrillia narasimhanii, Physoderma narasimhanii, and Cercospora narasimhanii have been named after him. He was elected a Fellow of the Indian Academy of Sciences in 1935.
