= M. Kunjikannan =

M Kunhikannan Master

Journalist, Gandhian, Educational and Social activist

Personal details
- Born: Mavilodan Kunhikannan Kannur, Kerala, British India
- Died: 30 June 2010 (aged 83) Kozhikode, Kerala, India
- Spouse: Kundancheri Narayani

Mavilodan Kunhikannan (25 July 1926 – 30 June 2010), popularly known as Kunhikannan Mash or Kunhikannan Master, was a journalist, Gandhian, and educational and social activist among tribals in Wayanad district of Kerala, India. He wrote for the Malayalam language newspaper Mathrubhumi starting in 1970. He also worked as reporter for Thozhilali, a newspaper published in Thrissur, Kerala. He was president of Kalpetta Girijan Co-Operative Society, and was a member of the Kerala Tribal Board, the State Orphanage Control Board and the Kerala Pradesh Congress Committee.
