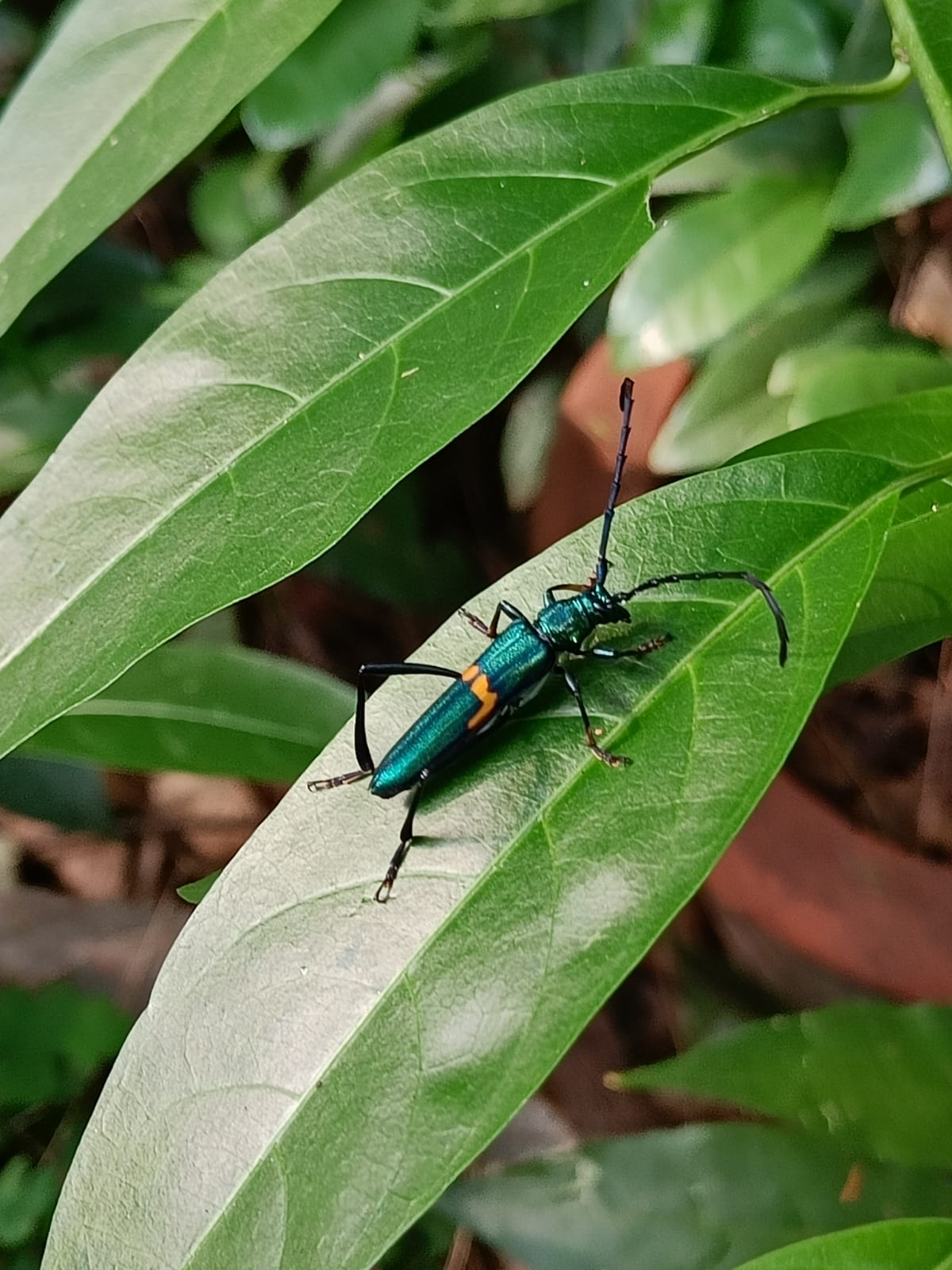

Scientific classification
- Kingdom: Animalia
- Phylum: Arthropoda
- Clade: Pancrustacea
- Class: Insecta
- Order: Coleoptera
- Suborder: Polyphaga
- Infraorder: Cucujiformia
- Family: Cerambycidae
- Genus: Chelidonium
- Species: C. cinctum

Binomial name
- Chelidonium cinctum (Guérin-Méneville, 1844)

Synonyms
- Callichroma cincta

= Chelidonium cinctum =

Species of beetle

Chelidonium cinctum is a species of long-horn beetle found in southern India. The larvae bore into the branches of citrus trees, sometimes causing damage in cultivated citrus crops.

The adult beetles are a bit more than an inch long and are dark metallic blue with a transverse yellow to orange band midway on the elytra. The band is transverse in the inner half of the elytra and extends posteriorly on the outer edge. The adults emerge in May and June after the rains and eggs are laid in the leaf axils of citrus trees. The larvae hatch and bore into the shoots, boring upwards and then girdling the tip of the branch which withers and turns black. It then bores inwards and pupates, emerging in a year. The populations can cause damage in citrus cultivation where they are managed by physical removal of the adults and by cutting of the branches showing girdling damage.
