= Kanesuke Hara =

Japanese botanist and mycologist (1885–1962)

Kanesuke Hara (原 摂祐, Hara Kanesuke, 1885–1962) was a Japanese botanist and mycologist.

== Publications ==
- Miyake, I.; Hara, K. 1910. Fungi on Japanese bamboos. Botanical Magazine Tokyo 24: (331)-(341), (351)-(360)
- Shirai, M.; Hara, K. 1911. Some new parasitic fungi of Japan. Bot.Mag.Tokyo 25: 69-73
- 1911. New genus of fungi on Arundinaria simoni. Botanical Magazine Tokyo 25: (222)-(225)
- 1912. On Coccidiodaceae. Botanical Magazine Tokyo 26: 139-[144]
- 1913. Fungi on Japanese bamboo 2. Bot.Mag.Tokyo 27 (317): (245)-(256)
- 1913. Miscellanea on fungi (2). Bot.Mag.Tokyo 27: (62)-(67)
- 1914. On fungi parasitic on insects found in Gifu prefecture. Bot.Mag.Tokyo 28: (339)-(351), (1 fig.)
- 1914. Journal of Plant Protection. Tokyo 1: inc. 269
- 1915. Über Polystomella kawagoii nov. sp. Bot.Mag.Tokyo 29: (51)-(54)
- 1918. Journal of Plant Protection. Tokyo 5: 805-808
- 1927. Zikken Zyomoku Byogai. Hen. inc. 350
- Shirai, M.; Hara, K. 1927. A List of Japanese Fungi Hitherto Known. Ed. 3. 1-448
- 1954. A List of Japanese Fungi Hitherto Known Edn 4]. 447 pp., 6 pls.
- 1955. Contribution to editing Japanese fungal index and promoting the development of Japanese mycology. Phytopathological Soc. Japan
- 1962. On the sooty mould on Citrus. Trans.Mycological Soc.Japan 3 (1-6): 104–111, 7 figs.
- Matsuda, H.; Maesaki, S.; Yamada, H.; Koga, H.; Kohno, S.; Hara, K.; Rahayu, E.S.; Sugiyama, J. 1992. Electrophoretic enzyme patterns of Aspergillus fumigatus isolated from clinical specimens. En H. Yamaguchi, G.S. Kobayashi & H. Takahashi [eds], Recent Progress in Antifungal Chemotherapy pp. 521–523. New York etc.; Marcel Dekker
