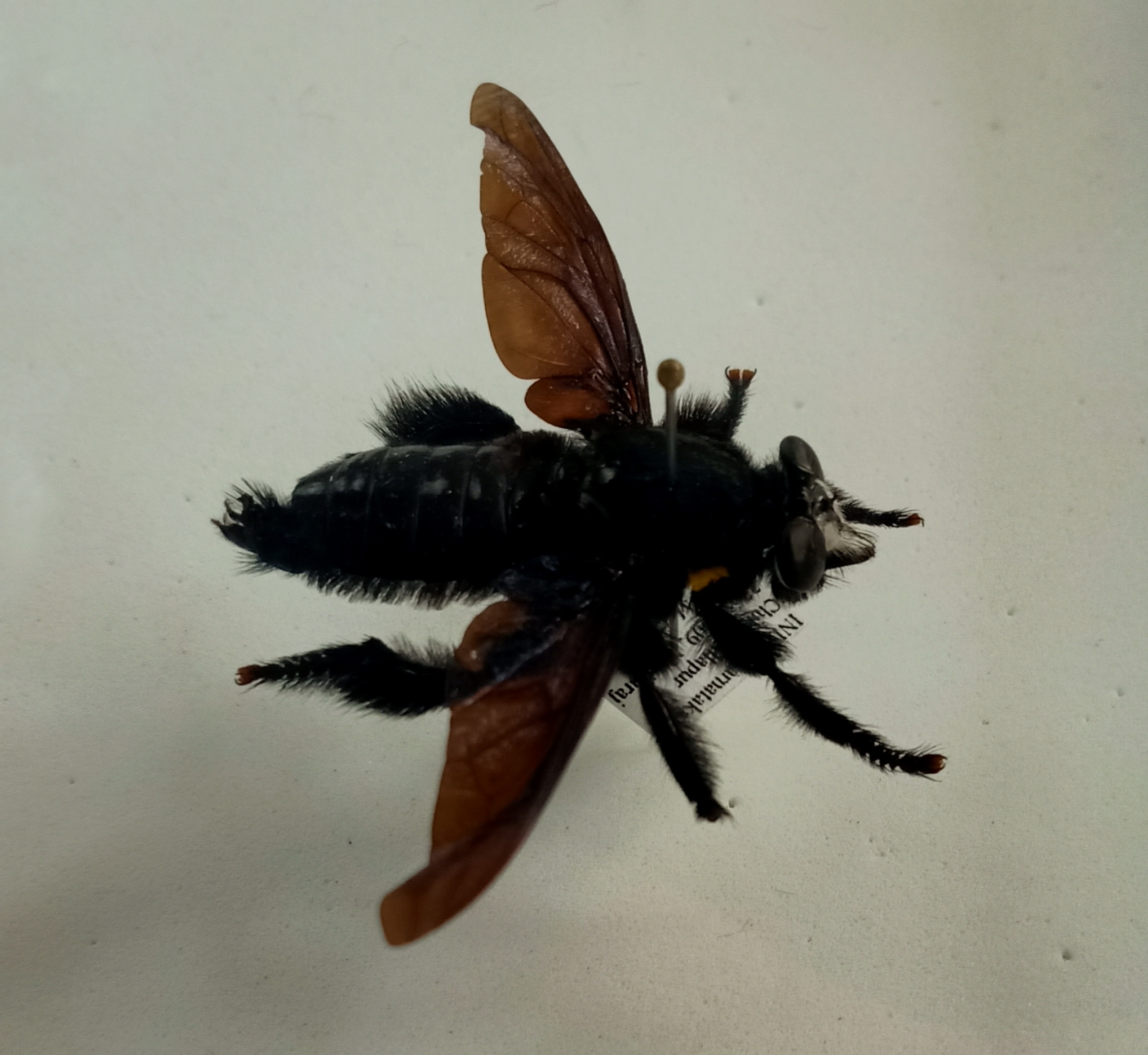
- Hyperechia xylocopiformis from India

Scientific classification
- Domain: Eukaryota
- Kingdom: Animalia
- Phylum: Arthropoda
- Class: Insecta
- Order: Diptera
- Family: Asilidae
- Subfamily: Laphriinae
- Genus: Hyperechia; Schiner, 1866

Type species
- Laphria xylocopiformis Walker, 1849

= Hyperechia =

Genus of flies

Hyperechia is a genus of robber flies in the family Asilidae. They appear large, stout and with legs covered in bristles and appear like carpenter bees in the genus Xylocopa and the resemblance is considered as a case of aggressive mimicry, providing protection from predators. The larvae of the fly feed on the larvae of Xylocopa within their cavity nests in wood. They are mainly found in the African and Madagascan region with about 15 species and two species in Asia.

== Taxonomic description ==
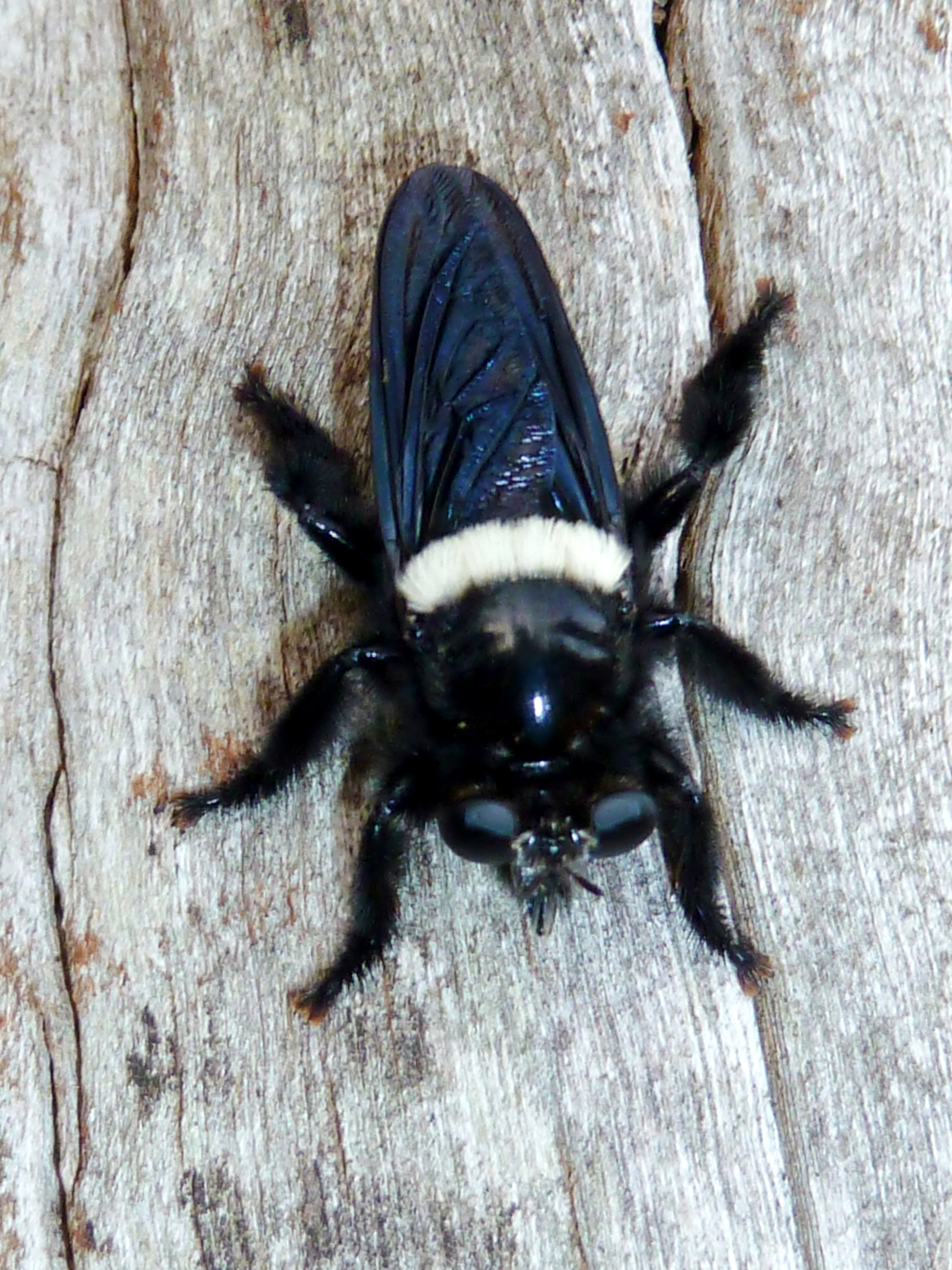
Hyperechia marshalli from South Africa

These robberflies are large with a broad abdomen, with long and dense hairs on the femora, tibiae and basal tarsus segments of the leg. The head is wide. The wing is broad at the base and tapered at the tip. The body is 22 to 35 mm long. The palps have the second segment large, thin and leaflike with bristles on the top. The antennae have a stout basal segment that is longer than the next which is knob-like at the distal end. The third antennal segment is elongated and slender widening towards the middle and becoming spindle shaped. The frons is short and shiny.

Species in the genus include:

Afrotropical realm

- Hyperechia bifasciata Grünberg, 1907
- Hyperechia albifasciata (Enderlein, 1930)
- Hyperechia bomboides (Loew, 1851)
- Hyperechia consimilis (Wood, 1874)
- Hyperechia marshalli Austen, 1902
- Hyperechia madagascariensis (Enderlein, 1930)
- Hyperechia nigripennis (Wiedemann, 1830)
- Hyperechia floccosa (Bezzi, 1908)
- Hyperechia fuelleborni (Grünberg, 1907)
- Hyperechia hirtipes (Fabricius, 1805)
- Hyperechia imitator (Grünberg, 1907)
- Hyperechia nigrita (Grünberg, 1907)
- Hyperechia pellitiventris (Enderlein, 1930)

Indomalayan realm

- Hyperechia xylocopiformis (Walker, 1849) from India
- Hyperechia fera (Wulp, 1872) from Borneo
