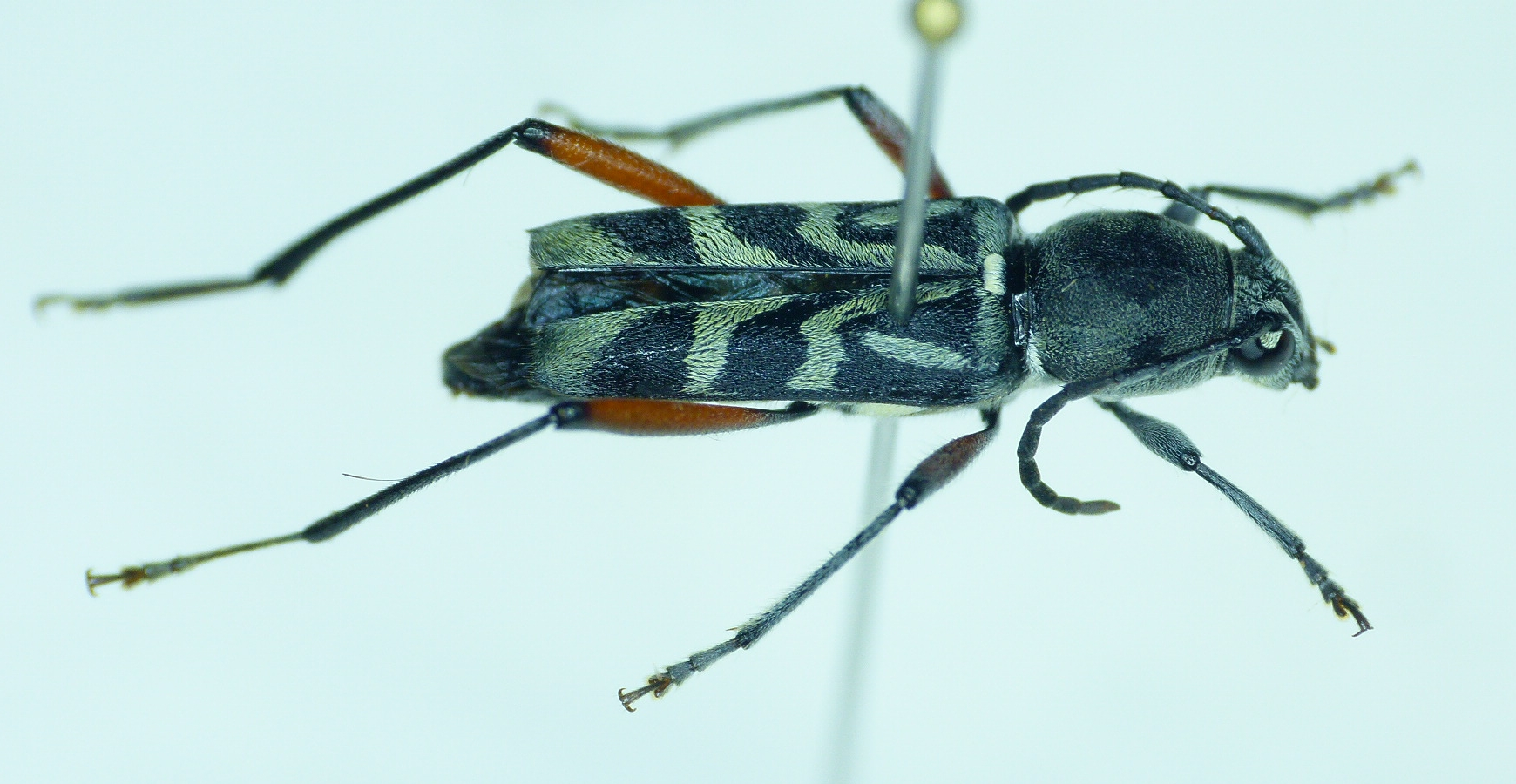
- Male of X. quadripes

Scientific classification
- Kingdom: Animalia
- Phylum: Arthropoda
- Class: Insecta
- Order: Coleoptera
- Suborder: Polyphaga
- Infraorder: Cucujiformia
- Family: Cerambycidae
- Genus: Xylotrechus
- Species: X. quadripes

Binomial name
- Xylotrechus quadripes Chevrolat, 1863

= Xylotrechus quadripes =

Species of beetle

Xylotrechus quadripes is a species of beetle in the family Cerambycidae. It was described by the French entomologist Auguste Chevrolat in 1863. In peninsular India, it is well known for its habit of boring through the stems of coffee plants in plantations and is considered a pest and known by the common name coffee white stem borer. Since the larvae damage the plant while being hidden inside the woody stems, they are extremely difficult to control. The control of shade over the coffee bushes however reduces the incidence.

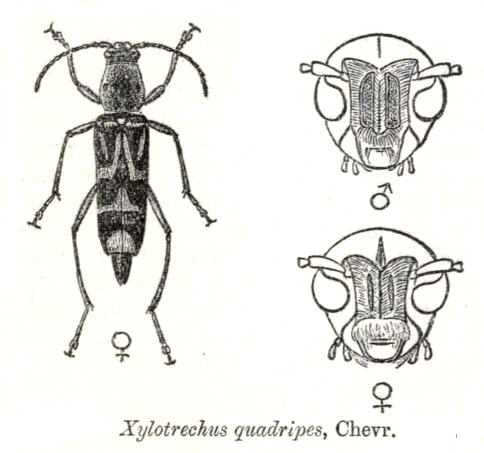
Key features

Males have the hind femur extending beyond the tip of the elytra while females have them falling short. Females have a single raised line or carina on the head while males have a median carina with two lateral ones on each side.
