= University of Agricultural Sciences, Bengaluru =

State University in Karnataka, India

Coordinates: 13.08220°N 77.57627°E

University of Agricultural Sciences
- Type: Public
- Established: 1964; 62 years ago
- Affiliations: UGC
- Chancellor: Governor of Karnataka
- Vice-Chancellor: Dr. S. V. Suresha
- Location: Bengaluru, Karnataka, India
- Campus: Urban
- Website: www.uasbangalore.edu.in

University of Agricultural Sciences, Bengaluru (UAS Bengaluru) is located in Bengaluru, India. It was established in 1964 as UAS Bangalore by a legislative act.

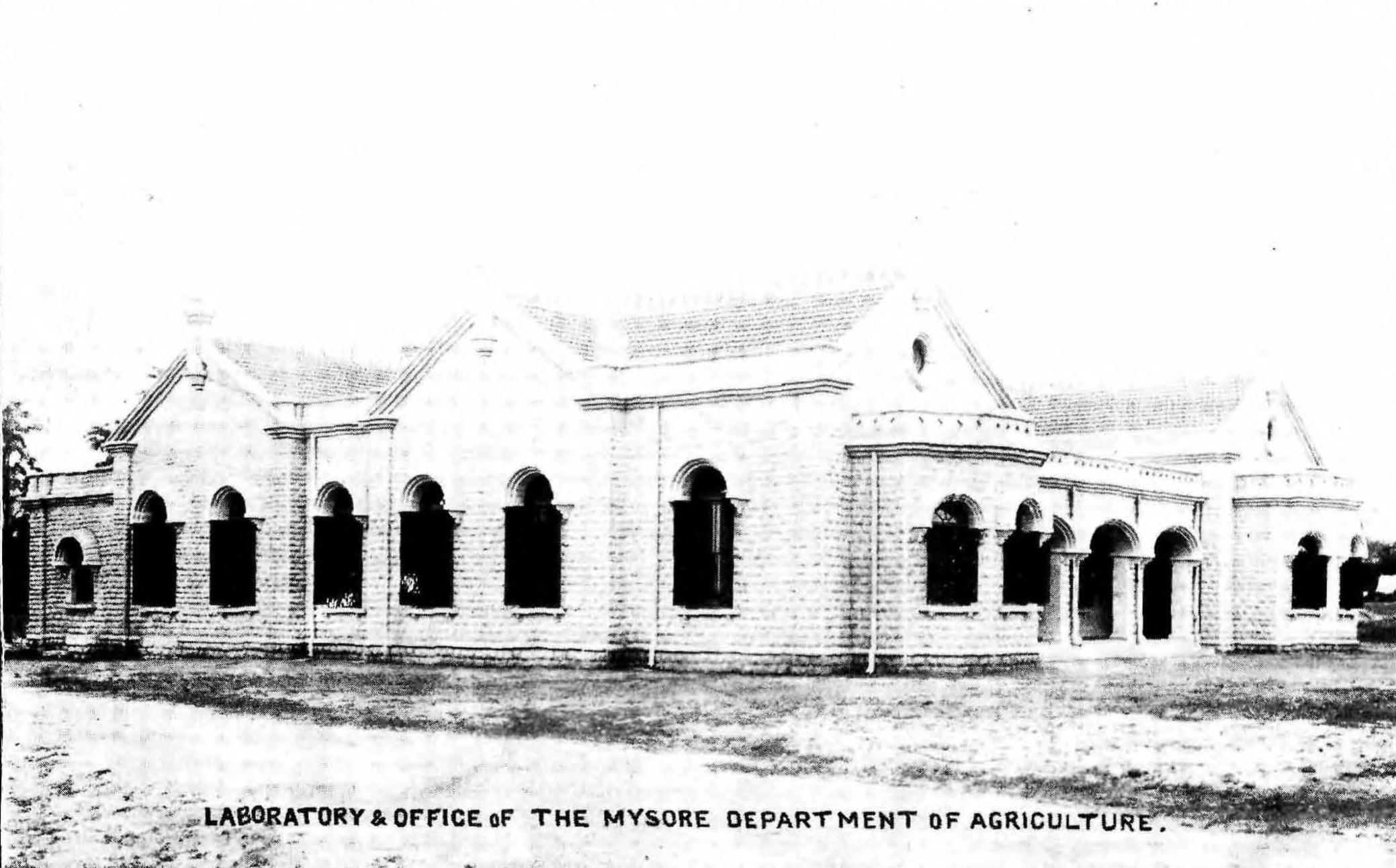
Lehmann's laboratory, now housing the department of agriculture in Bangalore

== Origin ==
The British government in India, shaken by several famines in India, set up a commission to improve the state of agriculture to reduce the impact of famines. This led to the Famine Commission of 1880 and in 1889 a commission was set up with Voelcker to examine agriculture in India. The report led the rulers of Mysore kingdom (The Wodeyars) to establish research units in the field of agriculture and donated about 30 acres (120,000 m^{2}) of land to set up an Experimental Agricultural Station at Hebbal, and appointed German-Canadian chemist Adolf Lehmann in 1900 who began research on soil fertility at a laboratory that now houses the Directorate of Agriculture. About 30 acres of land was then acquired at Hebbal for experimental fields. Later in 1906, Leslie Coleman, a Canadian Entomologist and Mycologist succeeded Lehmann and served for 25 years. Coleman founded the Hebbal Agricultural School which began in July 1913 with him as the founding principal.

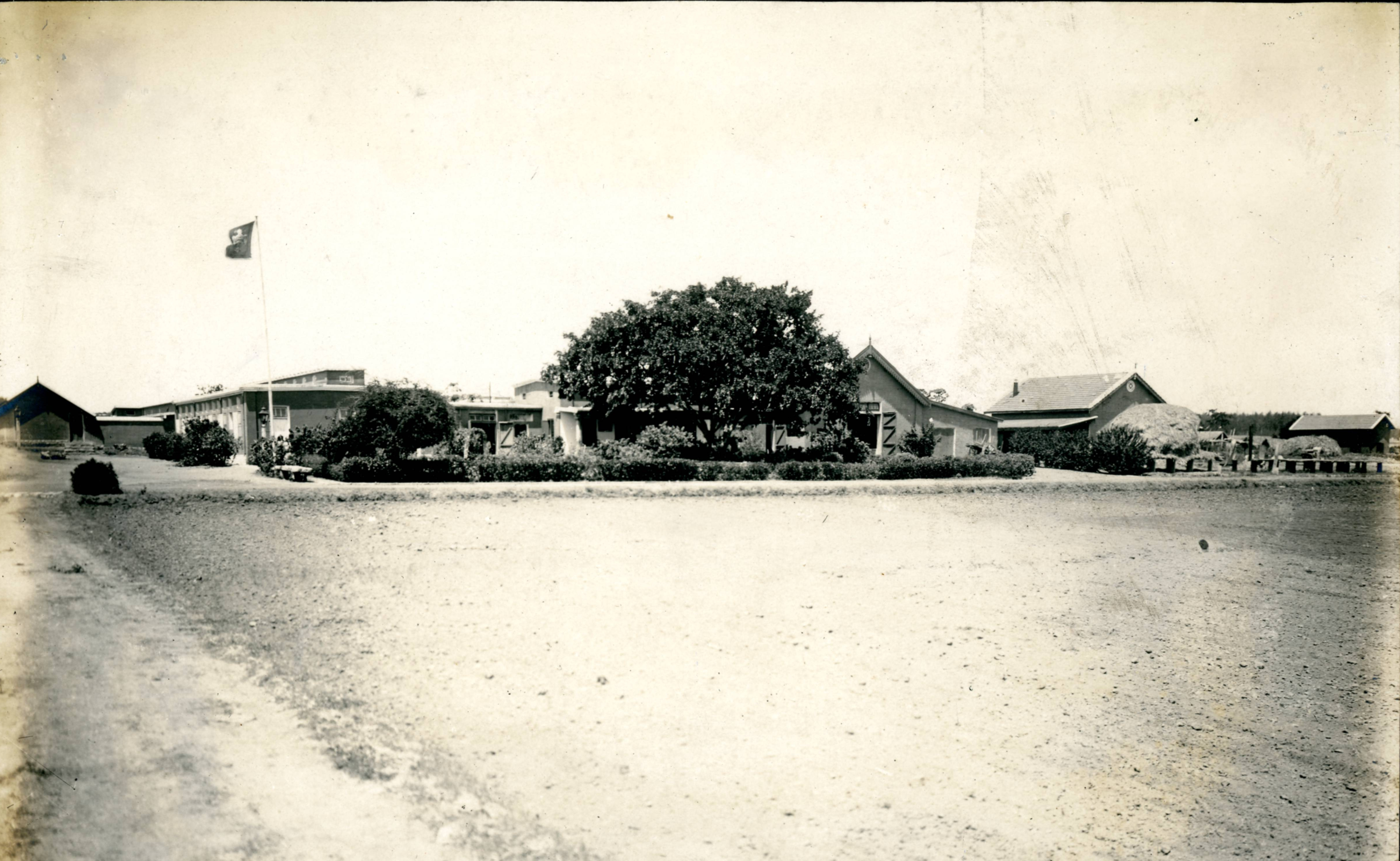
Mysore Agricultural School

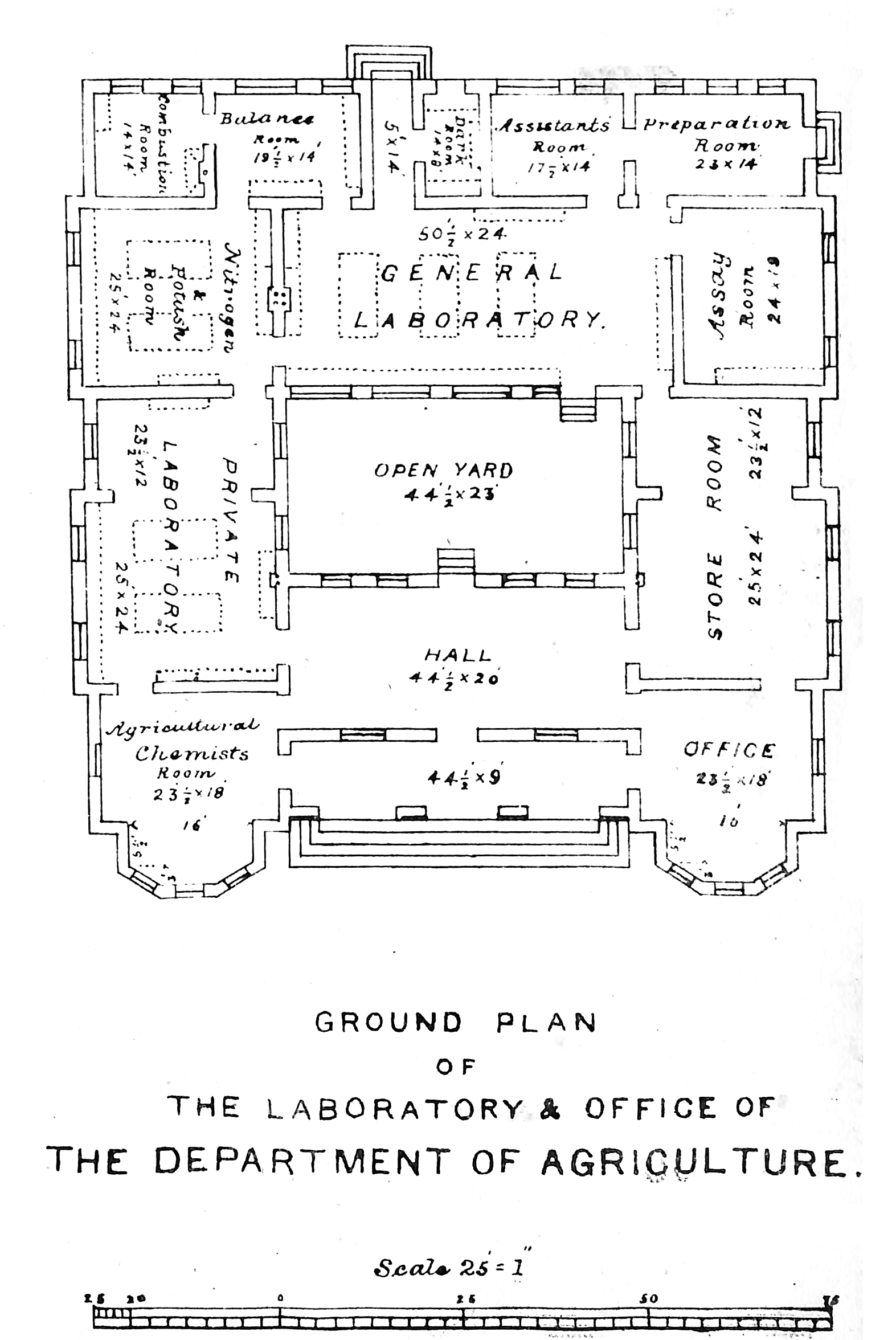
Plan of Lehmann's laboratory

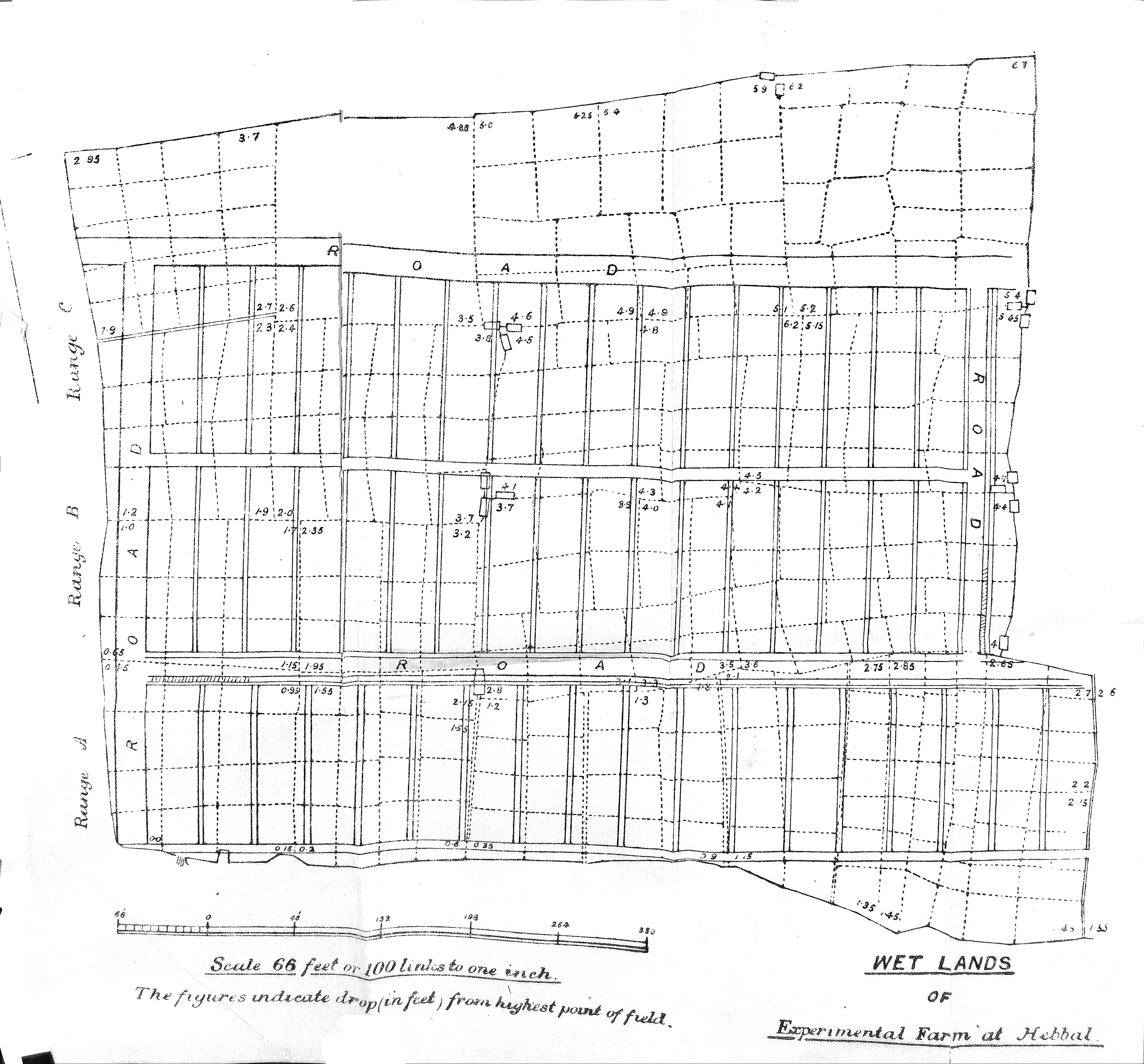
Plan of the wetland experimental plots at Hebbal (now the site of the Hebbal flyover)

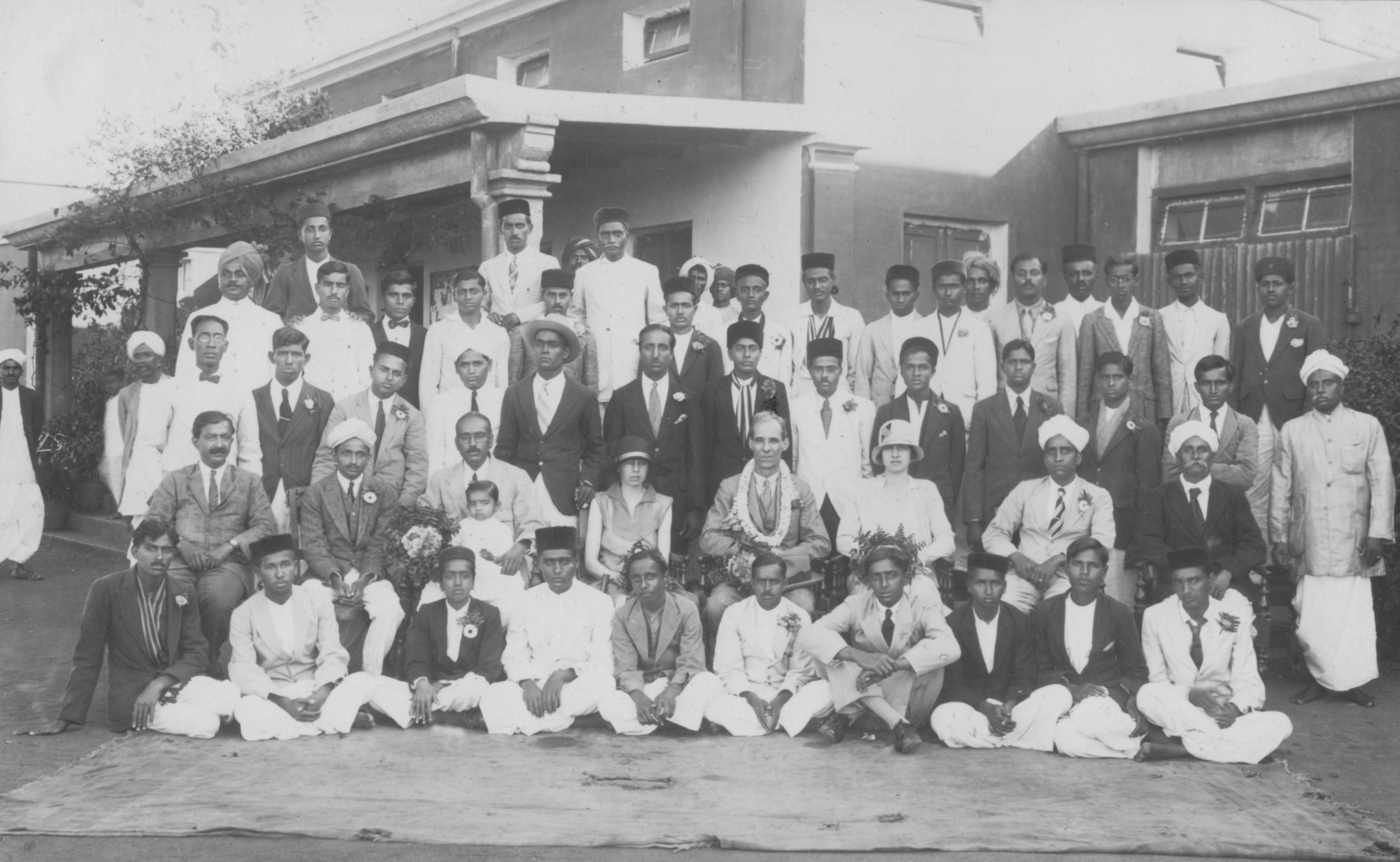
Diploma students in front of the Mysore Agricultural School, c. 1915

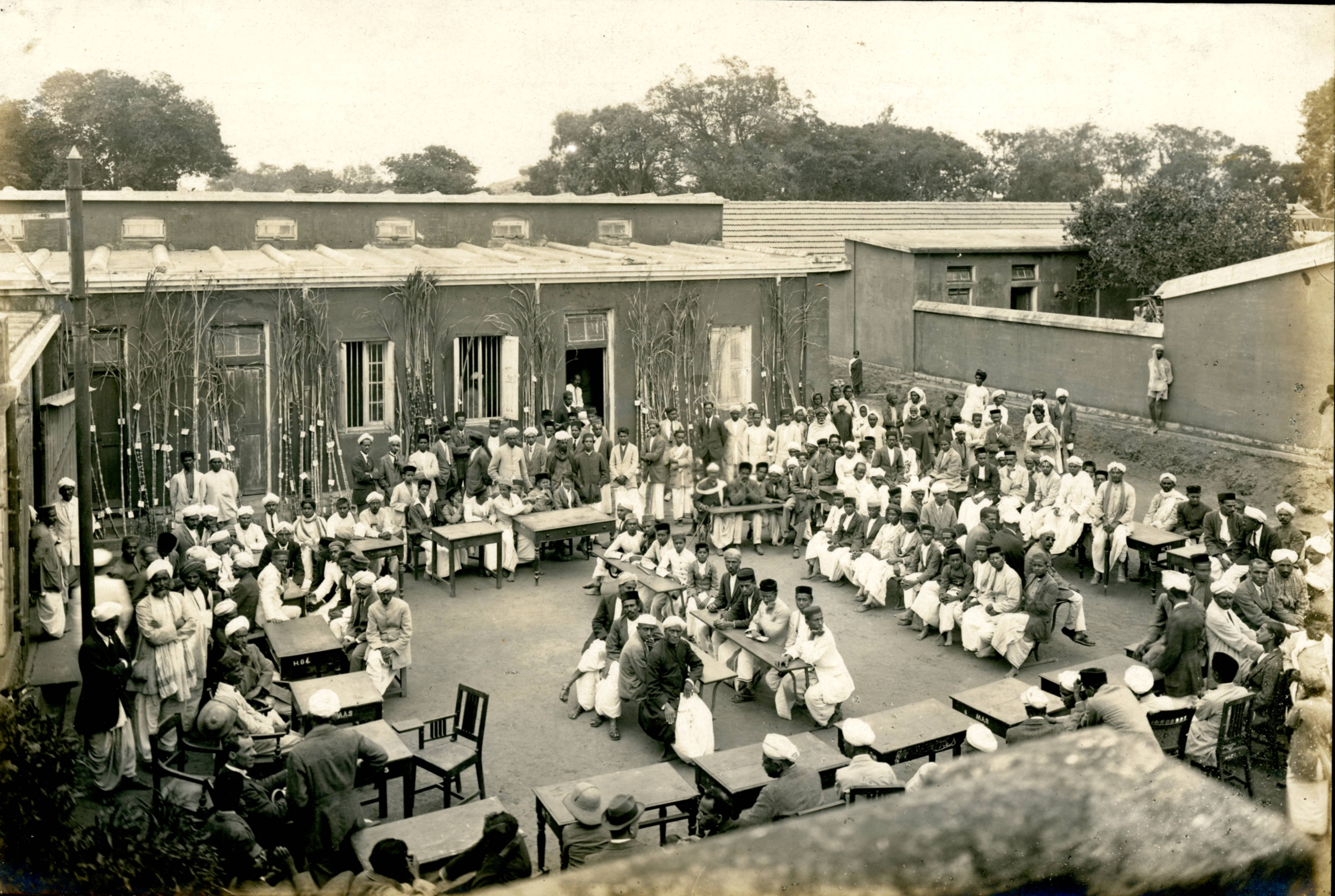
Farm day at the Mysore Agricultural School, c. 1930

What began on a 30-acre (120,000 m^{2}) land was soon extended to about 1,300 acres (5.3 km^{2}). The increasing reputation of this experimental station and school as a training center led to the conversion of the school to the Mysore Agricultural College which in 1946 became affiliated to the Mysore University. This was soon followed by the Agricultural College at Dharwad in 1947 which was then affiliated to Karnataka University. In 1958, veterinary science as a discipline was started with the establishment of the Veterinary College at Hebbal also affiliated to Mysore University.

=== Formation ===
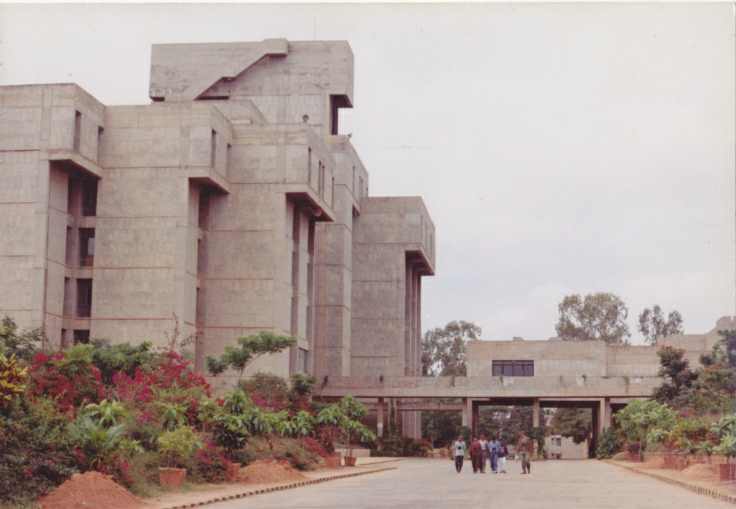
Administrative building of University of Agricultural Sciences, Bangalore, at Gandhi Krishi Vigyana Kendra also known as Naik Bhavan. The buildings were designed by Kanvinde who was trained in the Bauhaus School of Walter Gropius.

In 1948 a University Education Commission had been started under S. Radhakrishnan with members that included Zakir Hussain and the American educationist J.J. Tigert, and Arthur Ernest Morgan. They examined the Land-Grant colleges of the United States as a potential model for rural and agricultural education. This recommendation was taken up in 1961 with the formation of an Indo-American team to develop the universities and their curriculum. This resulted in a first Joint Indo-American team in 1954 that studied American universities leading to US-AID supported collaboration between American and Indian universities. A second team was established in 1959 that made recommendations to make agricultural universities autonomous and to have veterinary, home science, and agricultural education on a single campus with integrated teaching, extension and research. This was followed by a committee headed by Ralph W. Cummings of the Rockefeller Foundation, along with Ephraim Hixon of the USAID, L. Sahai (Animal Husbandry Commissioner) and K.C. Naik as convener. The then Mysore State Government through its Act No. 22 passed in 1963 provided for the creation of the University of Agricultural Sciences. The university came into existence on 21 August 1964 and was meant to serve the agricultural education needs of the state of Karnataka with a campus that included the old experimental stations at Hebbal established by Lehmann and Coleman with an additional campus at GKVK added in 1969. K.C. Naik served as the first Vice Chancellor. The UAS was inaugurated on 21 August 1964 by Vice President of India Zakir Husain in the presence of Chester Bowles, United States Ambassador to India and S. Nijalingappa, Chief Minister of Karnataka. On 12 July 1969, Prime Minister Indira Gandhi inaugurated GKVK campus with its buildings designed by the architect Achyut Kanvinde who was influenced by Walter Gropius. The Ford Foundation made a grant of $331000 in 1966 to develop graduate research in entomology at the university.

The university initially included the agricultural colleges at Hebbal and Dharwad, the Veterinary College at Hebbal, the fisheries college at Mangalore, and 35 research stations located in different parts of the state following agroclimatic zonation and focus on specific crops along with 45 ICAR projects which were with the State Department of Agriculture, Horticulture, Animal Husbandry and Fisheries.

=== Later years and growth ===
Later on the Marine Product Processing Training Centre (MPPTC) at Mangalore and Krishi Vigyan Kendra, Hanumanamatti, Dharwad were also transferred to the university.

The university established the Fisheries College at Mangalore in 1969 to provide degree level training and the Agricultural Engineering Institute at Raichur in the same year to offer a three-year diploma course in Agricultural Engineering. The Home Science College was started to impart education on rural based home science at Dharwad campus in 1974, besides establishing a College of Basic Sciences and Humanities and College of Post Graduate Studies at Hebbal.

The phenomenal growth of the university, the differences in agroclimate in the parts of the state, led to the bifurcation of the university into two agricultural universities. An amendment to the University of Agricultural Sciences Act in 1986 saw the birth of the second university for agriculture in the state. The University of Agricultural Sciences, Bangalore was entrusted territorial jurisdiction over 15 southern districts of Karnataka comprising nearly fifty percent of the total area of the state, while the University of Agricultural Sciences, Dharwad, was given jurisdiction over the remaining area in the northern districts of the state.

In 2005, with the needed to provide better autonomy to the veterinary education and research in the state, the Veterinary and Animal sciences faculty was bifurcated form both the Universities of Agricultural Sciences - Bangalore and Dharwad and placed under the single university - Karnataka Veterinary, Animal and Fisheries Sciences University with its headquarters in the northern district of Karnataka, Bidar by the passing of the Karnataka Veterinary, Animal and Fisheries Sciences University Bill, 2004 in the Legislative Assembly on 10 February 2004.

== Constituent colleges ==
The university has constituent colleges at places of Karnataka:

- College of Agriculture, GKVK, Bengaluru
- College of Sericulture, Chintamani
- College of Agricultural Engineering, GKVK, Bengaluru

== Ranking and notability ==
In 2012, the university was recognised as the best agricultural university in India by the Indian Council of Agricultural Research for which it was conferred the Sardar Patel Outstanding ICAR Institution Award for excellence in teaching, research and extension. In 2021, the university was recognised as the best agricultural university in South India and 3rd best state university in India. As Per Now This University Ranks Top 7 in India. In 2025 it is Accredited with A+ Grade From NAAC

The NIRF (National Institutional Ranking Framework) ranked it 11th among Agriculture institutes in India in 2024.

== Notable people ==
=== Alumni ===
- Subbanna Ayyappan
- Krishna Ella, Cofounder of Bharat Biotech
- K. N. Ganeshaiah
- Sonny Ramaswamy, former director of the USDA's National Institute of Food and Agriculture
- Kalidas Shetty, Professor at North Dakota State University, Fargo, North Dakota
- M. Mahadevappa
- Tapas Kumar Kundu
- K. Puttaswamy

==== Civil service ====
- D. K. Ravi
- S. M. Raju
- J. Radhakrishnan

==== Politics ====
- R. Dhruvanarayana
- G. Parameshwara

== See also ==
- University of Agricultural Sciences, Dharwad
- University of Agricultural Sciences, Mandya
- University of Agricultural and Horticultural Sciences, Shimoga
- University of Agricultural Sciences, Raichur
- University of Horticultural Sciences, Bagalkot
- Karnataka Veterinary, Animal and Fisheries Sciences University
