= Gandhi Krishi Vigyana Kendra =

Headquarters of university in Bangalore

Gandhi Krishi Vignana Kendra, Bengaluru
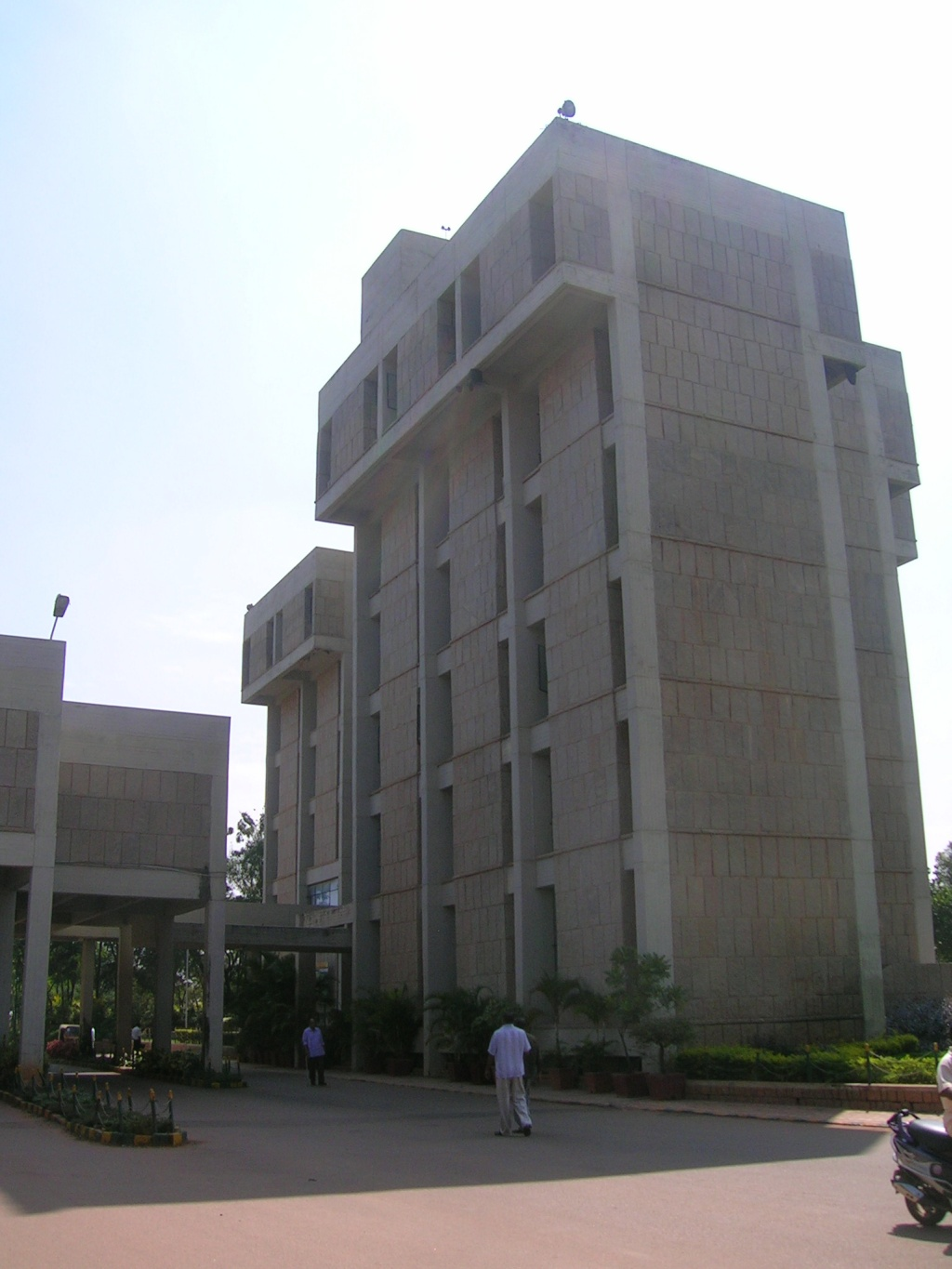
- Other names: GKVK, Bengaluru
- Type: Public research university
- Affiliations: University of Agricultural Sciences, Bengaluru
- Dean: Dr. N. B. Prakash
- Location: Bengaluru, Karnataka, 560065, India
- Campus: 412 acres (167 ha); Urban
- Website: www.uasbangalore.edu.in

Gandhi Krishi Vignana Kendra (GKVK) is the main campus of the University of Agricultural Sciences, Bengaluru. It is located in the suburb of Vignana Kendra, Karnataka, India. In the past the university had a campus at Hebbal and experimental fields where the current Hebbal flyover stands.The university was split into two universities to deal with the animal sciences and agricultural sciences. The colleges within the campus were originally of agriculture, horticulture, forestry sericulture, and with a basic sciences and humanities block. These were reorganized leaving only the college of agriculture on the campus.

== History ==
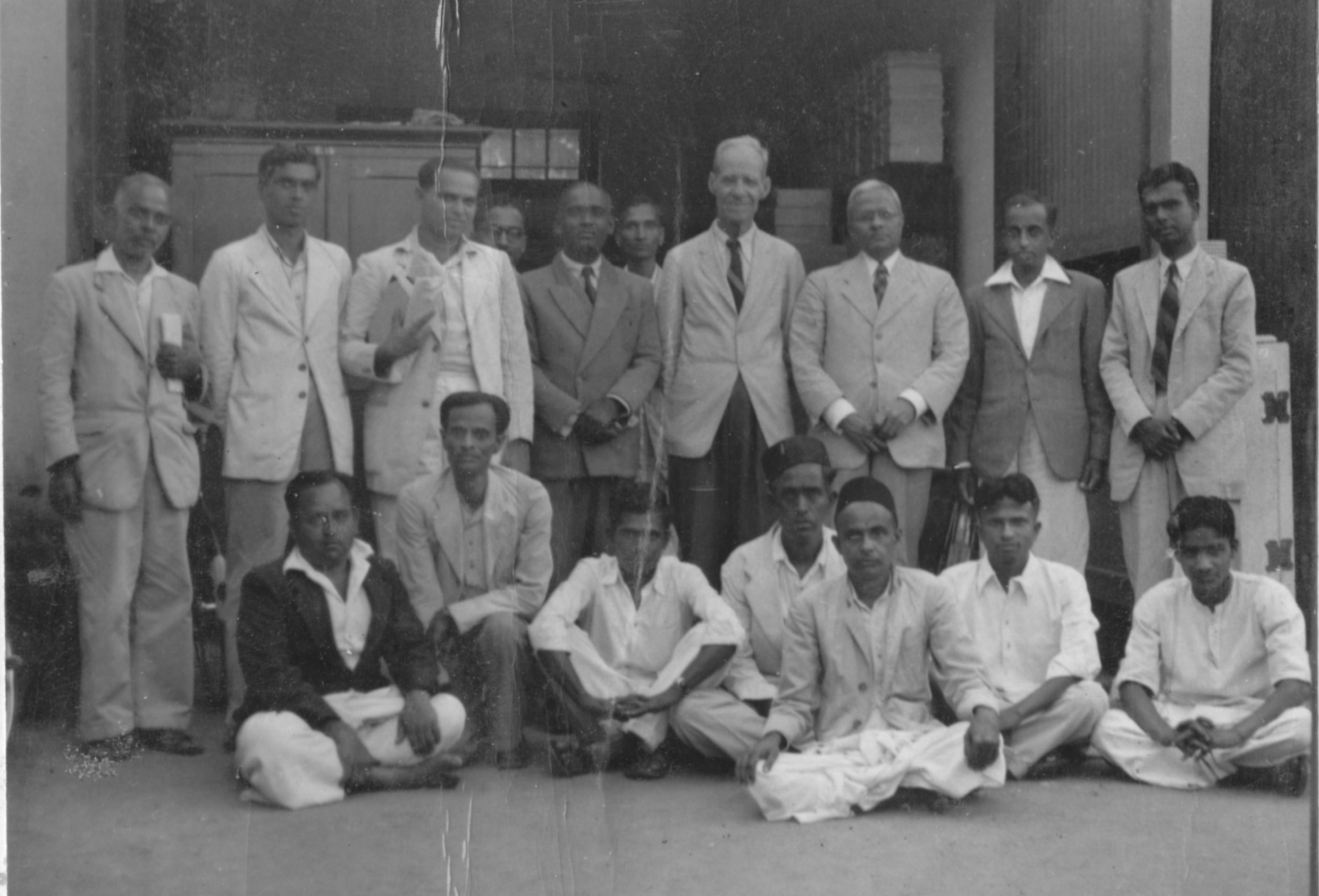
Leslie Charles Coleman with staff and students of the Department of Entomology at UAS Bangalore in 1953/54.

Maharani Kempa Nanjammanni Vani Vilasa Sannidhi, the Regent of Mysore, donated 30 acres of land in 1899 for the Experimental Agricultural Station at Hebbal. Adolf Lehmann, a Canadian scientist, initiated research on soil crop response. In 1906, Dr. Leslie Coleman, a Canadian Entomologist and Mycologist, succeeded Lehmann.

The station expanded to 202 acres, under the Diwan M. Vishveshwaraiah, and Coleman who helped establish the Mysore Agriculture School in 1913. In 1946, Mr. M.A. Srinivasan, Minister of Agriculture, founded Agriculture College, Hebbal, offering a four-year program affiliated with the University of Mysore.

In 1963, the University of Agricultural Sciences (UAS) was established, with 1300 acres granted for the Gandhi Krishi Vigyana Kendra Campus. Dr. K.C. Naik became the first Vice Chancellor in 1964. In 1969, Indira Gandhi inaugurated the GKVK campus. Veterinary College, Hebbal, was established in 1958.

On October 1, 1965, UAS Bangalore absorbed various agricultural colleges and research stations. It expanded its offerings, establishing the Fisheries College at Mangaluru in 1969 and the Agricultural Engineering Institute at Raichur. In 1974, Home Science College was founded at the Dharwad campus, alongside other colleges.

== Campus ==
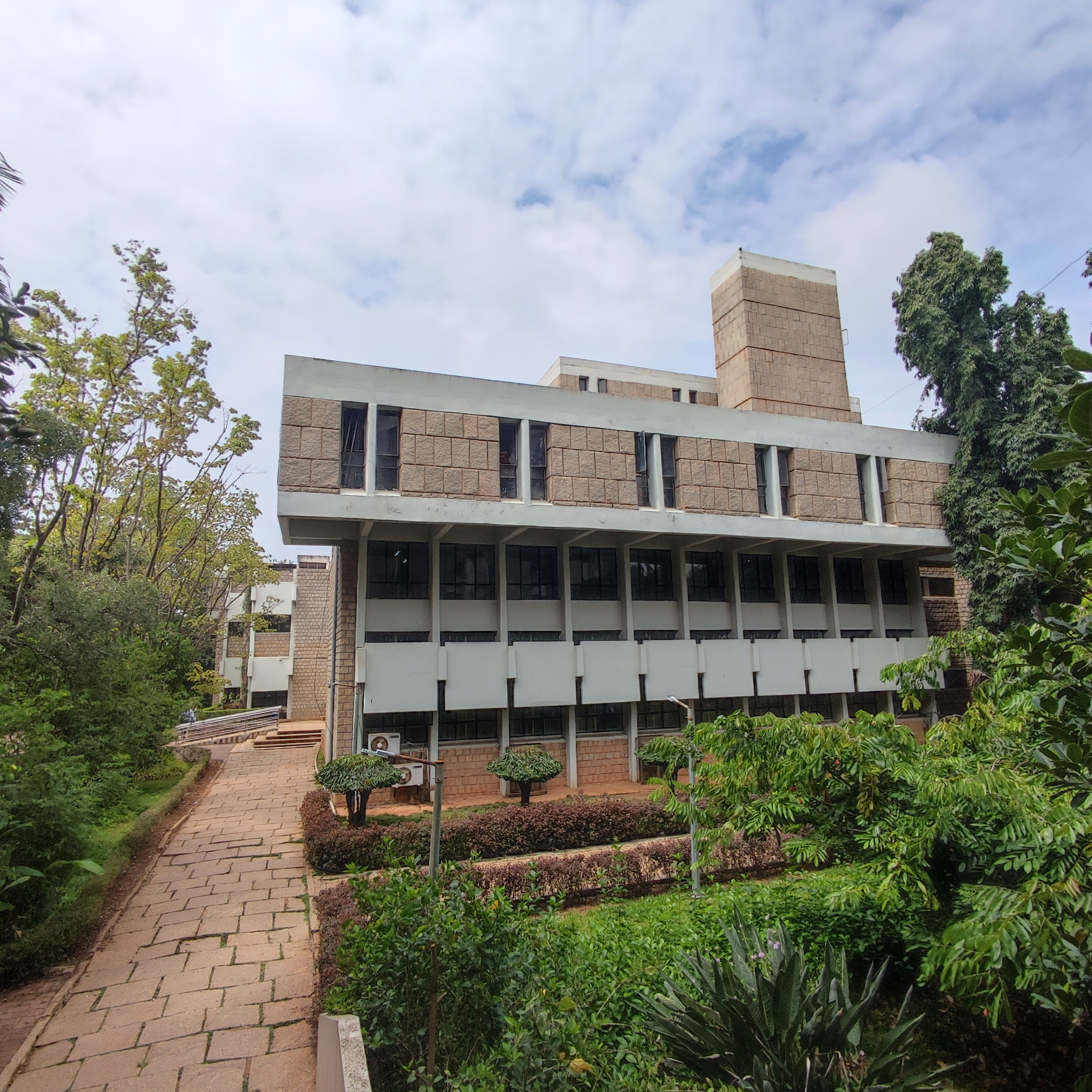
Library

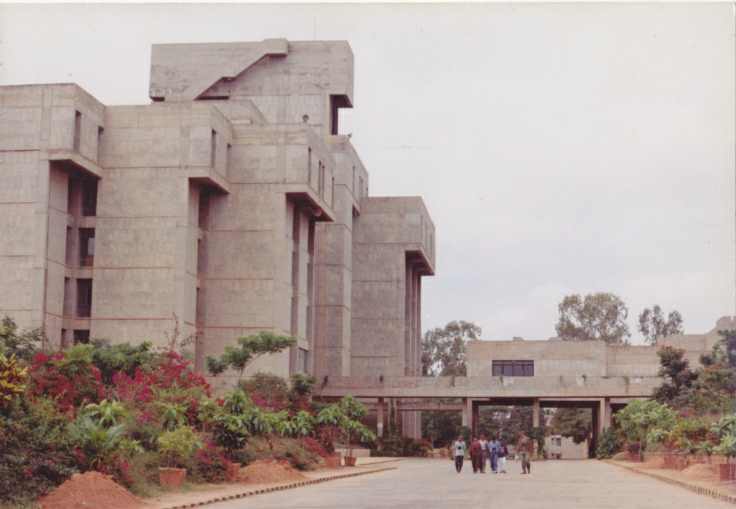
In 2006

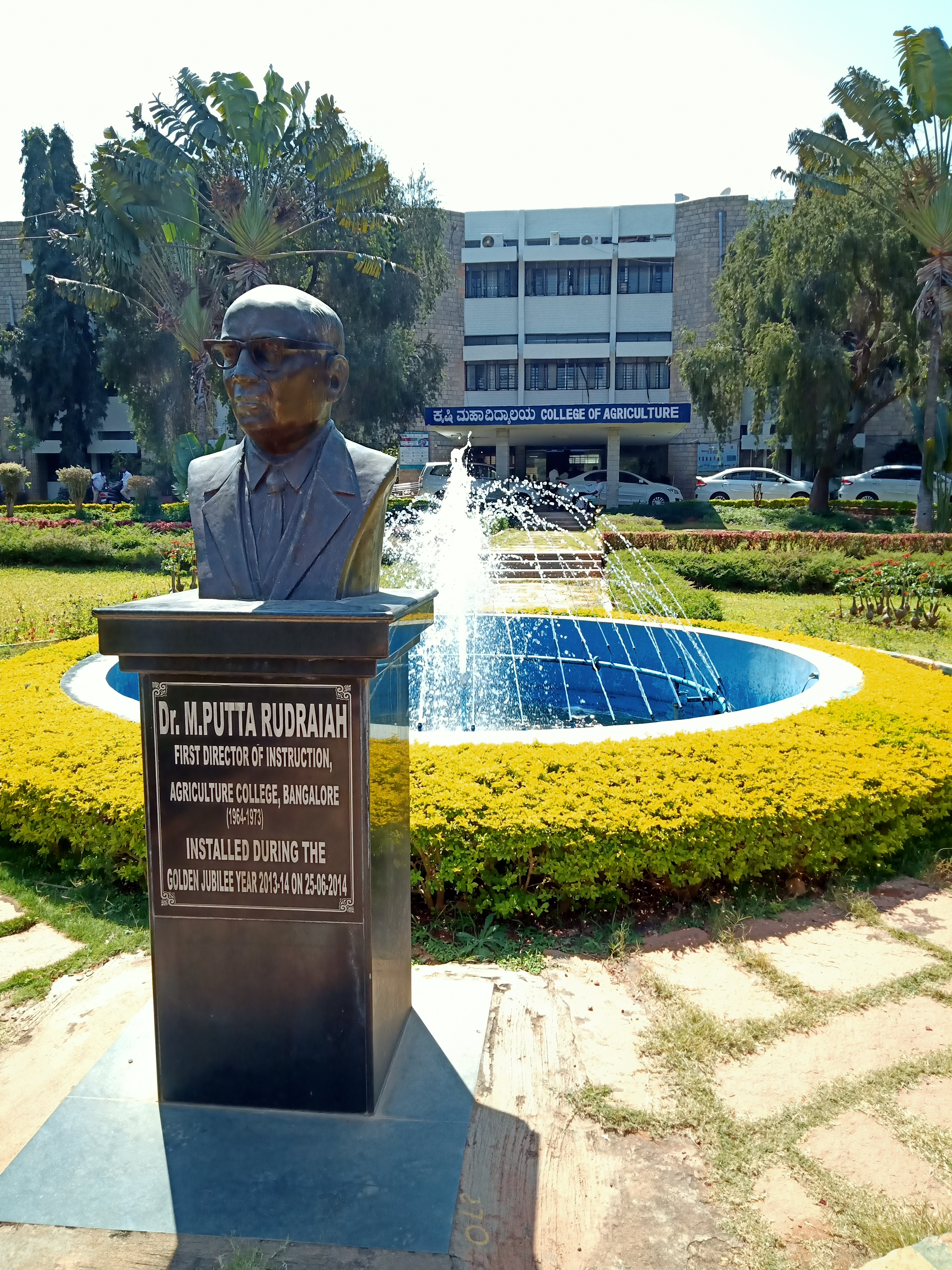
Bust of M. Puttarudriah

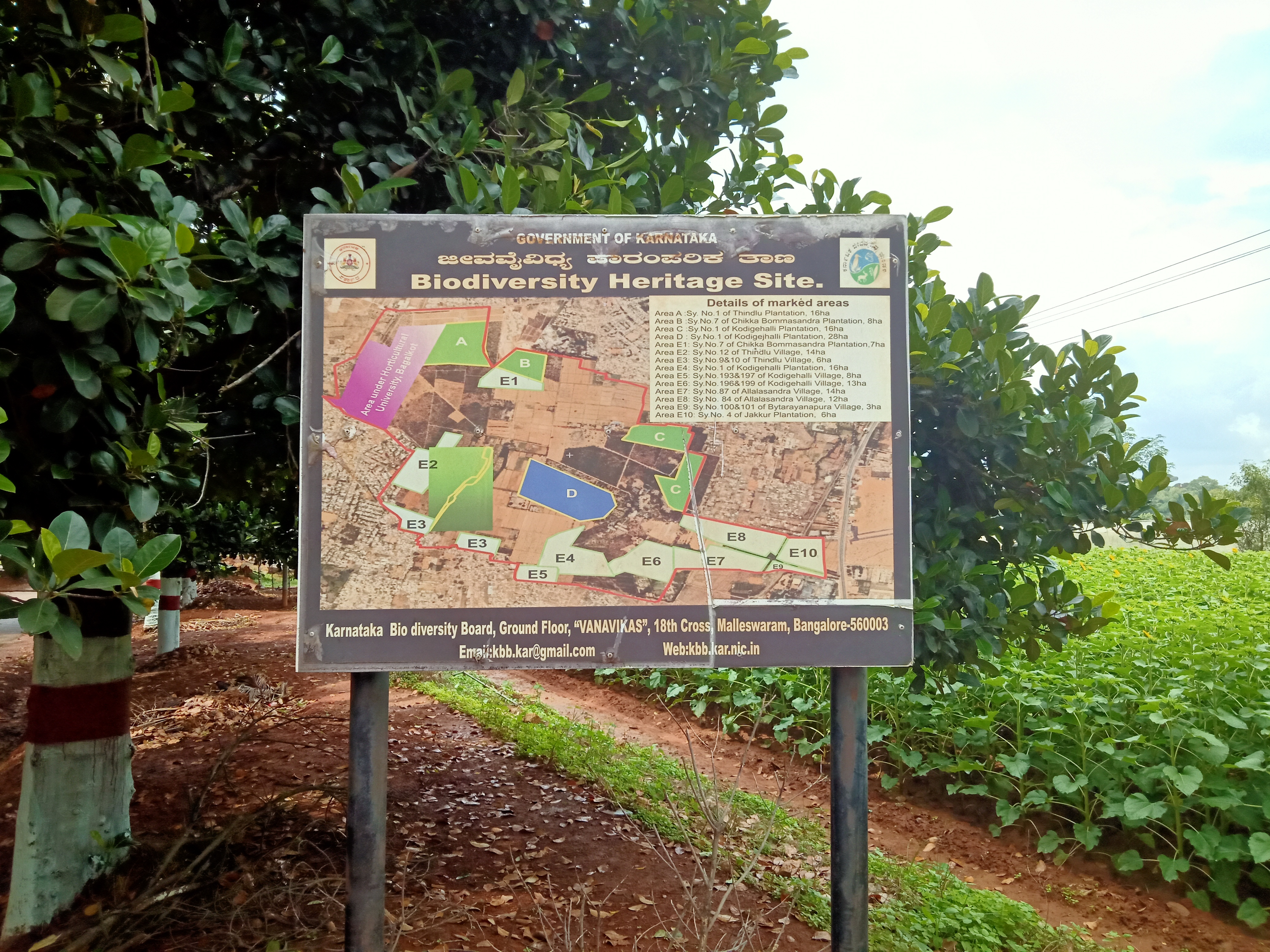
Heritage Site Map

The campus comprises 412 acres of land. The campus was declared as a biodiversity heritage site in 2010 by the Karnataka Biodiveristy Board. The university has engaged in development of various agro and biotech research plots, as well as nurturing its landscape to support a diverse range of flora and fauna. Its campus is said to be known for its efforts towards environmental sustainability, being considered as one of the greenest areas in Bengaluru. In addition to its research endeavors, the university has facilitated the collection of a wide array of germplasms and has established a botanical garden boasting nearly 600 species of important plants. Furthermore, the university has implemented herbal gardens and conducted research on agriculturally significant microbes, among other initiatives. In 2023, About 1000 eucalyptus trees were axed as it was decided to replace them with 10,000 native species of trees. Victoria amazonica is also present in the campus and is grown to distribute to various other institutions among the country. GPS-enabled smart bicycles for students and staff of the University are available in the campus.

=== Fauna Biodiversity ===
The campus has about 13 species of mammals, ten species of reptiles, 165 species of birds and over 500 species of plants according to a survey. eBird lists around 171 species of birds seen in the campus.

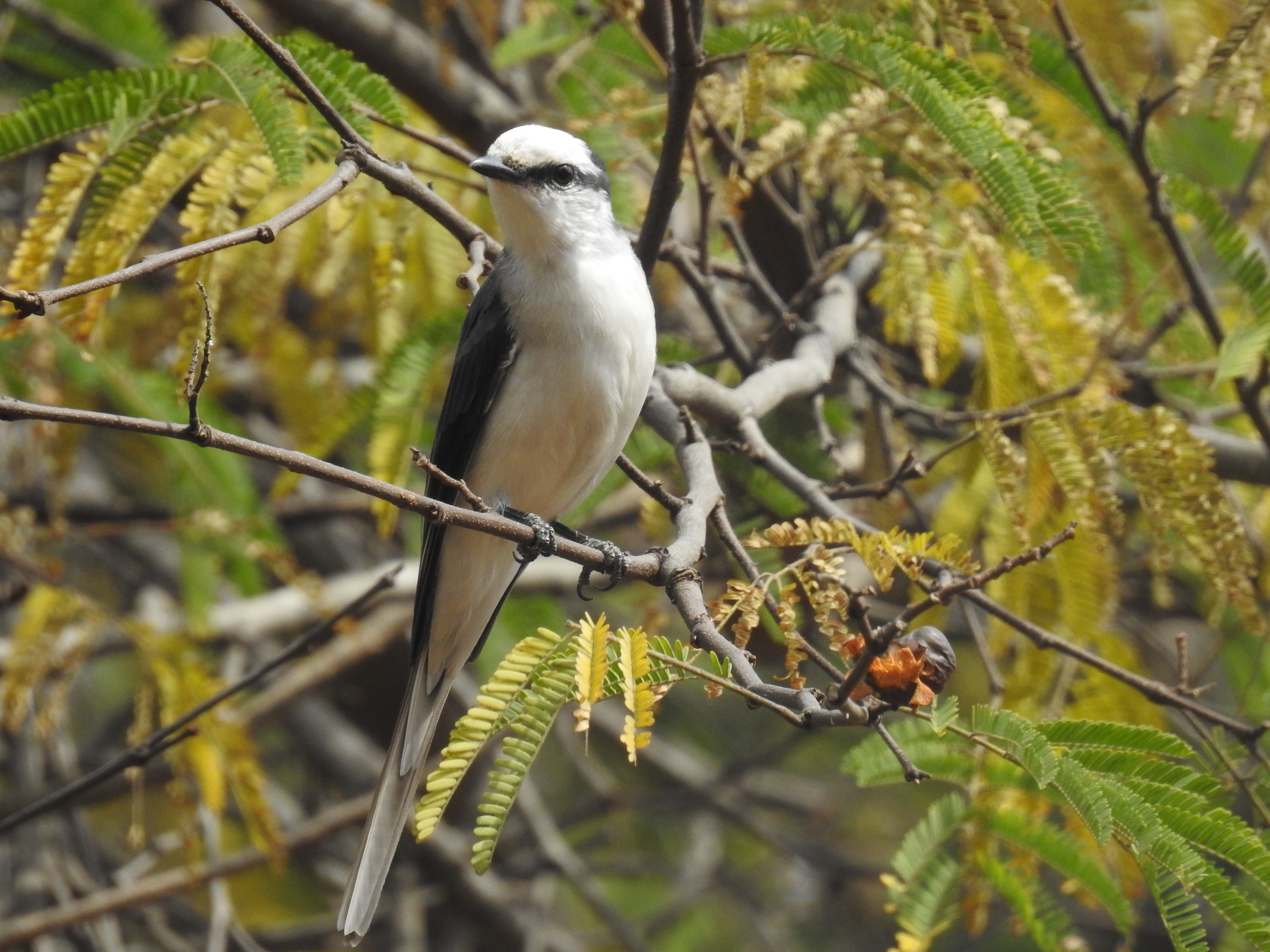
Swinhoe's minivet from the gardens of the campus.

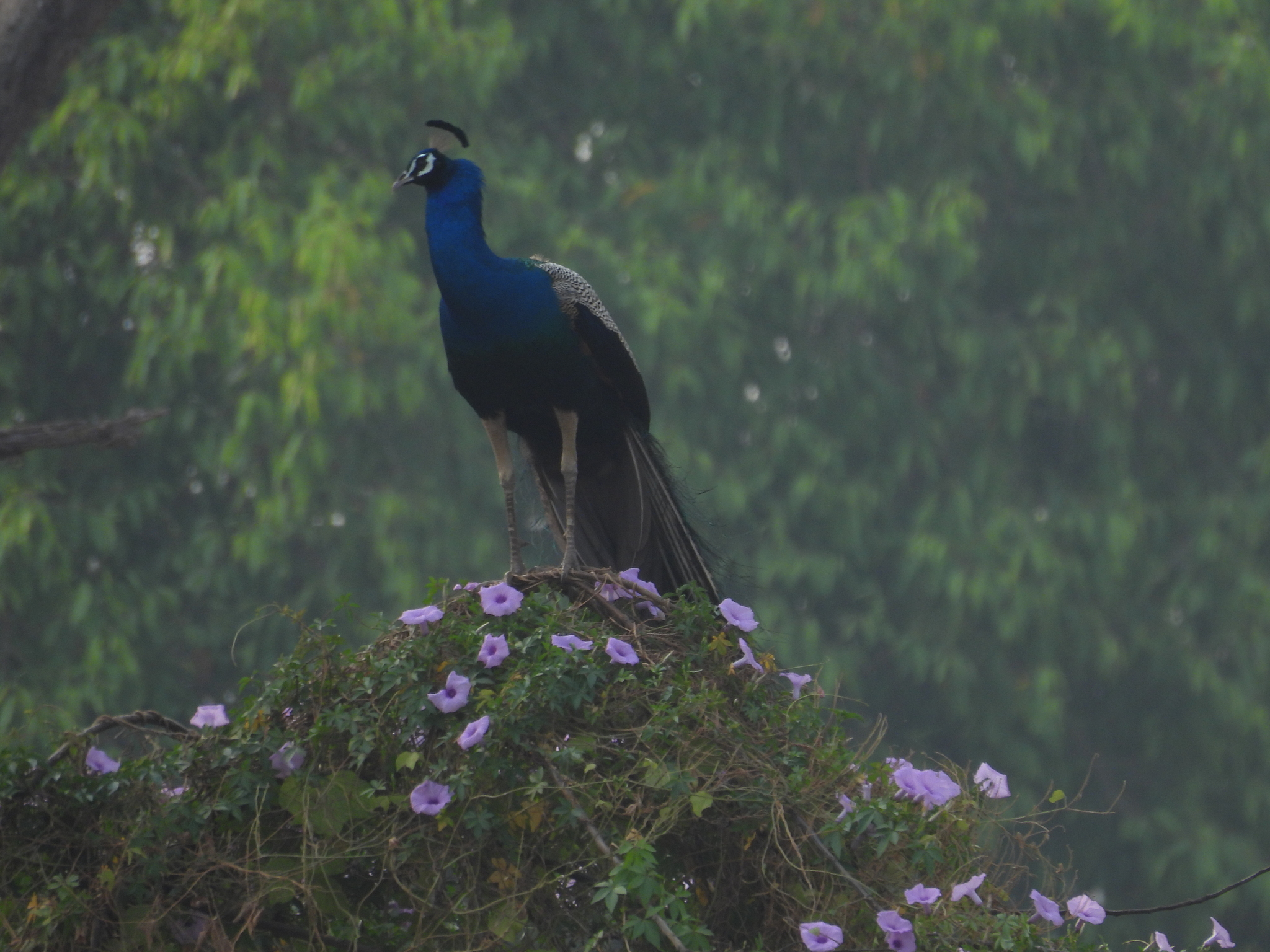
Indian Peacock on top of a flowerbush within the campus.

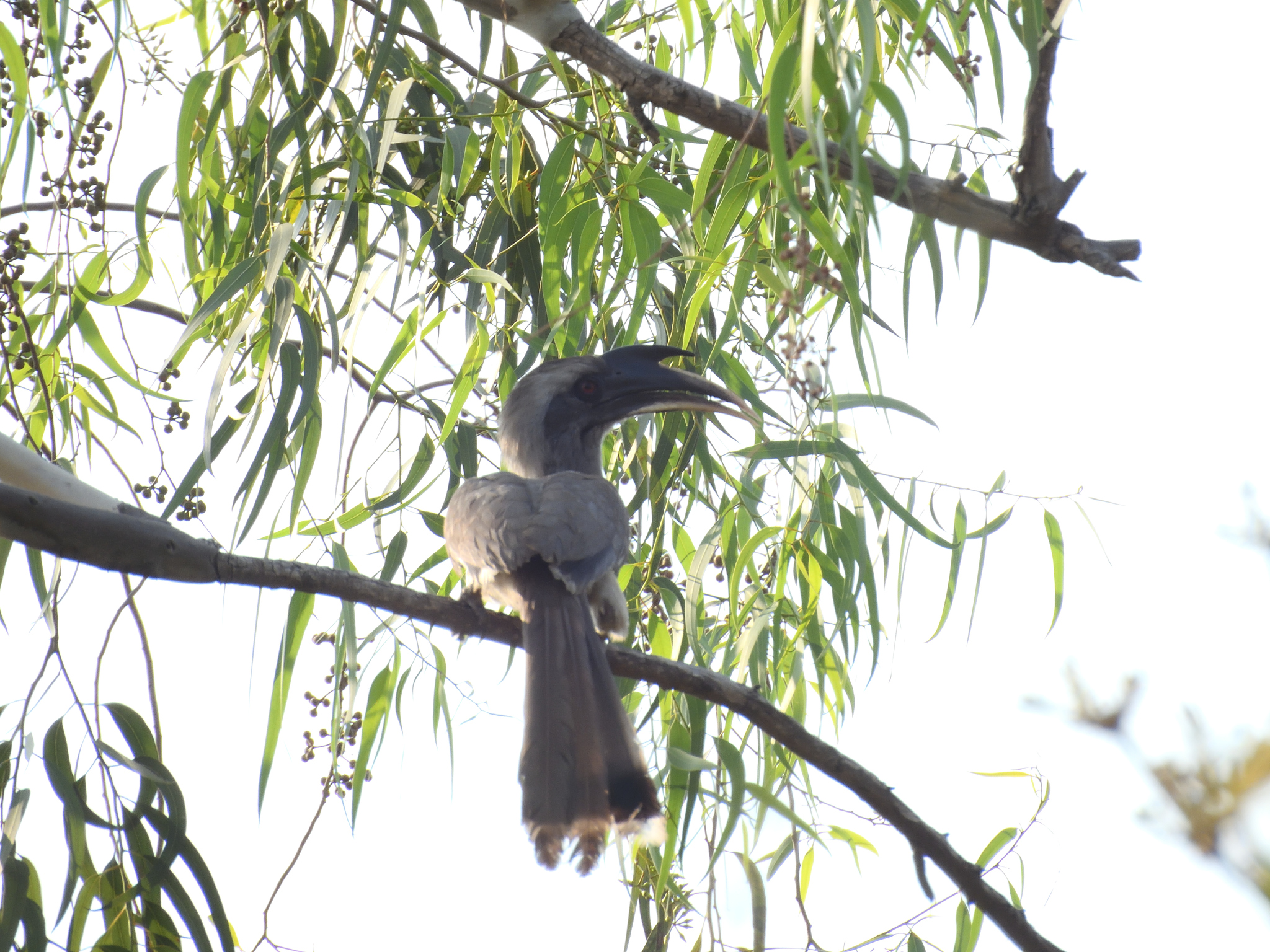
Indian Grey Hornbill from the campus.

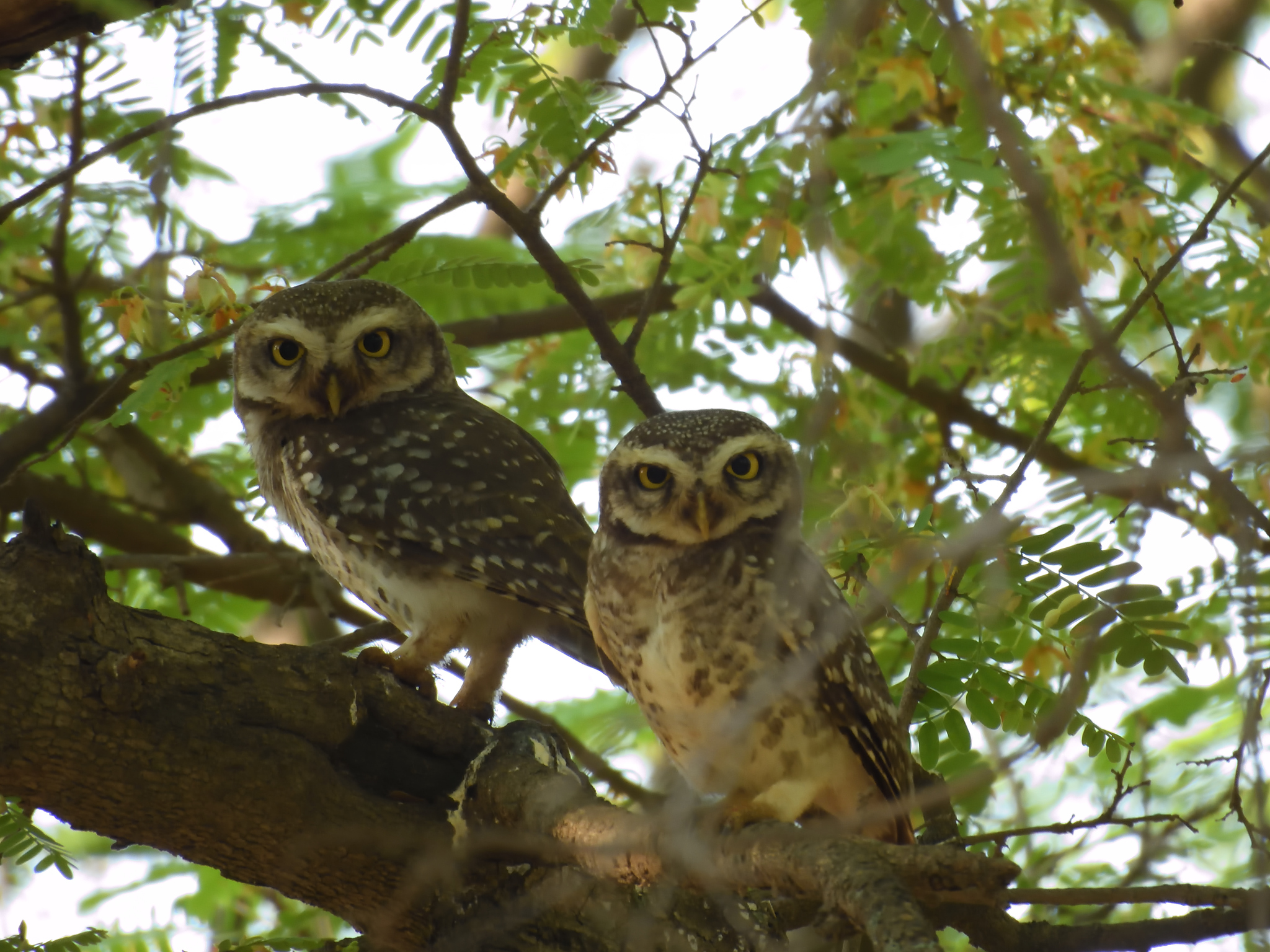
Spotted Owlet from the campus.

=== Krishi Mela ===
Krishi Mela is an annual event (fair) in the campus. It showcases latest agricultural technologies for the benefit of farmers. The event includes stalls from various research institutes, seeds companies, farm machinery manufacturers in India as well as stalls showcasing techniques of organic farming and produces. In 2022, 1.7 million people visited the fair, and over 95 million transactions were conducted.
