= Mooka dhatu =

2012 novel by K.N. Ganeshaiah

Mooka Dhaatu
- The Kannada novel,"ಮೂಕಧಾತು "
- Author: K.N. Ganeshaiah
- Language: Kannada
- Genre: Science fiction
- Published: 2012 Ankita Pustaka, Bengaluru.
- Publication place: India
- Media type: Print (Hardcover & Paperback)
- Pages: 248
- Preceded by: Elu rottigalu
- Followed by: Shilakula valase

Mooka Dhaatu is a science fiction novel by Dr. K. N. Ganeshaiah. It is a thriller which relates God, science, religion, desire, civilization, selfishness, life, DNA, selfish gene theory, and evolutionary theory.
