= M. Mahadevappa =

Indian geneticist (1937–2021)

Madappa Mahadevappa
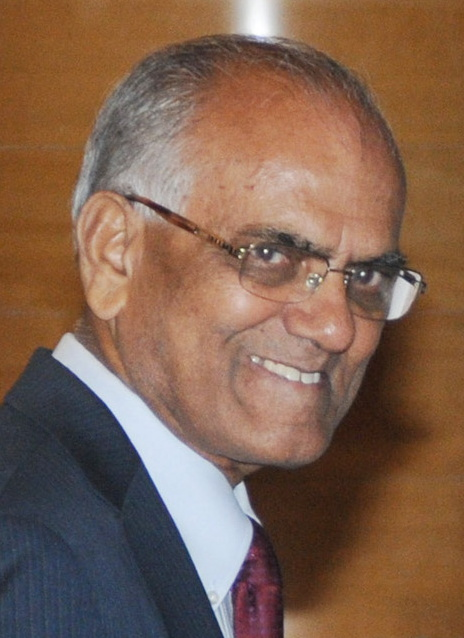
- Mahadevappa in 2014
- Born: 4 August 1937; Madapura, Chamarajanagar, Mysore State, British India (present-day Karnataka, India)
- Died: 6 March 2021 (aged 83); Mysuru
- Citizenship: Indian
- Education: Sarada Vilas College; University of Agricultural Sciences, Bangalore; Tamil Nadu Agricultural University
- Known for: High-yielding Hybrid varieties of Rice in India
- Awards: Padma Bhushan (2014); Padma Shri (2005); Rajyotsava Prashasti (1984); Bharat Ratna Sir. M. Vishweshwarayya Memorial Award (1999); HONOR SUMMUS AWARD, The Watumall Foundation (1987); Hooker Award (1981); Sir Chotu Ram National Award (1996); Best TNAU Alumunus Award (2002); Agriculture Leadership Award (2009); K.K. Murthy Award (1973); Syndicate Agriculture Foundation Award (1973); Nagamma Dattatreya Rao Desai Award (1989); Nada Prabhu Kempegowda award (2017); Krushika Kula Pradeepika (1996); Prof C N R Rao KSTA Lifetime Achievement Award in Science and Technology (2020)
- Scientific career
- Fields: Agricultural science, Forestry, Plant Breeding, Seed Technology, Parthenium Weed Management
- Workplaces: JSS Rural Development Foundation; University of Agricultural Sciences, Dharwad; Indian Council of Agricultural Research; University of Agricultural Sciences, Bangalore; International Rice Research Institute, Philippines; Central Food Technological Research Institute

Madappa Mahadevappa (4 August 1937 – 6 March 2021), popularly known as Rice Mahadevappa was an Indian agricultural scientist and plant breeder, renowned for developing high yielding hybrid varieties of rice. He served for more than 55 years and had a glowing career. He served as the Vice-chancellor of University of Agricultural Sciences, Dharwad for two terms (1994 - 2000) and his selfless hard work along with broad vision lead to the award of ICAR's SARDAR PATEL OUTSTANDING INSTITUTION award in the year 2000 to UAS, Dharwad. He served as chairman of Agricultural Scientists Recruitment Board (2002 - 2003) under Indian Council of Agricultural Research of which he was a member of governing council. As chairman of ASRB, he introduced radical changes to create transparency in recruitment and expedited the process of promotions. This enhanced the talent pool at ICAR system to further contribute to the cause of the agriculture and farming community. He was the recipient of Padma Bhushan, India's third highest civilian honour, Padma Shri and various other accolades.

== Contributions ==
Mahadevappa, an elected fellow of the National Academy of Agricultural Sciences, contributed extensively to the Indian agrarian community through various innovative applications and research initiatives including development of over nine varieties of high yielding hybrid rice varieties. While being a pioneer in hybrid rice farming in the country, he was also credited for his Integrated Parthenium Weed Management, a scientific and efficient weed management technique against the invasive Parthenium.

After retirement, he has been serving as Director of Rural Dev in JSS Mahavidyapeetha, Mysore - a reputed NGO with 340 institutions in four countries. He implemented the novel ‘seed village’ concept to uplift the socio-economic status of BPL farmers (7633 families benefited in ~500 villages of 28 districts) by reducing their dependency on external agencies and by providing sustained employment with the financial support of Rural Development Ministries. Implementation included establishment of i) Seed processing and storage units ii) 50 horticulture and forestry nurseries iii) 20 commercial silkworm chawki Rearing Centres iv) 40 shade net houses for producing vegetables and v) 300 value addition units. After retirement till his last breath, he was serving as Director of Rural Dev in JSS Mahavidyapeetha, Mysore - a reputed NGO with 340 institutions in four countries. He implemented the novel ‘seed village’ concept to uplift the socio-economic status of Below Poverty Line (BPL) farmers (7633 families benefited in ~500 villages of 28 districts) by reducing their dependency on external agencies and by providing sustained employment with the financial support of Rural Development Ministries. Implementation included establishment of i) Seed processing and storage units ii) 50 horticulture and forestry nurseries iii) 20 commercial silkworm chawki Rearing Centres iv) 40 shade net houses for producing vegetables and v) 300 value addition units. He is the Founder and Chief Editor of popular Kannada quarterly “Krishi Kayaka” which is widely subscribed as a useful resource of information for farmers, students and extension workers.

Mahadevappa was a recipient of the Padma Bhushan and Padma Shri.

== Death ==
Mahadevappa died on 6 March 2021, due to age related ailments, in Mysore.
