= K. Puttaswamy =

K. Puttaswamy may refer to:

- Kalastavadi Puttaswamy (1917–1978), Indian lawyer and politician
- K. Puttaswamy (scholar) (born 1957), Kannada poet, scholar, critic, and playwright
- K. S. Puttaswamy (1926–2024), Indian judge
