= UASD =

UASD may refer to:

- Universidad Autónoma de Santo Domingo
- University of Agricultural Sciences, Dharwad
