= M. B. Chetti =

Indian academic administrator

Dr. M. B. Chetti
- Born: 1 July 1957 (age 68). Rukmapur, Yadgir, India
- Known for: Educationist
- Website: www.uasd.edu/index.php/university/2015-12-02-02-10-03

M. B. Chetti is a Vice Chancellor of University of Agricultural Sciences, Dharwad. He was former Assistant Director General, Education Division of Indian Council of Agricultural Research.
