= Karisiryana =

2009 novel by K. N. Ganeshaiah

Karisiriyaana
- Author: K. N. Ganeshaiah
- Language: Kannada
- Subject: History
- Genre: Historical fiction
- Published: 2009 Sahitya Bhandara
- Publication place: India
- Media type: Print (Hardcover)
- ISBN: 4567139135
- Preceded by: Kanaka Musaku
- Followed by: Kapilipisara

Karisiriyaana or Karisiriyana is a history based thriller novel authored by Dr. K. N. Ganeshaiah. The title 'Karisiriyaana' is a portmanteau of three Kannada words, 'kari', 'siri', and 'yaana', which respectively mean 'elephant', 'wealth' and 'journey'. The novel has a story based on the legend which claims that the huge wealth in the Vijayanagara kingdom was moved to a secret location soon after the death of its last king, on several hundred elephants. There was a three day gap between the last day of the last battle of Vijayanagara empire and the beginning of the looting of the precious gems and gold the king had possessed by the rival Muslim kings. In those three days, a large chunk of the wealth got mysteriously disappeared. The hunt for this treasure is the plotline of the novel. To add more mystery, the novel uses several historical facts related to Vijayanagara Dynasty. Characters in the novel explore the details surrounding this empire and related wealth. The novel has the description of rise of the empire and the reasons behind it, also how others captured the wealth. Kings interaction with Tirupati Venkateswara temple, and a brief history of the temple is described. This book has many facts with listed references suitable for students and researchers along with general readers.
