= K. N. Ganeshaiah =

Indian agronomist

Dr.K.N Ganeshaiah
- Born: K.N. Ganeshaiah; Kotiganahalli Kolar District, Karnataka, India
- Occupations: Writer, Novelist, Professor, agricultural scientist
- Writing career
- Genre: Fiction

K.N. Ganeshaiah is an agricultural scientist and an Emeritus professor of the University of Agricultural Sciences, Bangalore. He is also a novelist specializing in thrillers, and writes in the Kannada language.

== Science publications ==
Ganeshaiah is a prolific scientific author. He has

- published ~ 200 scientific papers
- edited 11 books
- authored 25 distinct works of literature
- contributed 38 chapters to other books
- published 14 papers in various meeting proceedings
- prepared 11 reference CDs
- authored 13 popular articles

== Fiction ==
Ganeshaiah has also contributed to the literature of the Kannada language. He has published many novels and story collections, as well as having 12 of his short stories published in various magazines.

Novels:

- Kanaka Musaku (2007)- Chandra Gupta Maurya gave up throne, travelled down south to ShravanaBelagola to spread Jainism. Being a ruler, he knew spreading religion needs tonnes and tonnes of resources. He brought with him loads of Gold, all morphed as Sweet Corn Seeds. Huge vault of Gold and its linkages with Jain Temples (Hoysala, Ganga & other Jain Kingdoms) in Karnataka.
- Karisiryana (2009) - What made VijayaNagara Kingdom, the object of so much praise among foreign travelers? The riches of selling gems on road-side? Tuluva KrishnaDevaRaya, immigrated from Tulu speaking Mangalore, lorded over VijayaNagara & wrote epics in Telugu? What was it, in that charmed Pampa Nagari, that faced unheard ire and ended up as Haalu Hampe (laid to dust place)? What happened to all those riches?
- Kapilipisara (2009) - After Sri Rama chandra ascended throne at Ayodhya, what happened to his Vanara Sena? What if they all immigrated to Andaman? Hanuman, Sri Rama's chieftain was disillusioned after Rama abandoned his pregnant wife Seetha, to uphold his pride. What if Andaman is mispronunciation of Hanuman? Are the Jarawa and other tribes, really offspring of Vanara's, who built the famed Rama Sethu?
- Chithadantha (2010) - Buddha's teeth is revered and a prized possession. What if it was the key to the famed riches of Magadha Kingdom, which attracted conquerors across the world, including Alexander of Greece? Why was the DevanaamPriya Ashoka, the apostle of peace, also called ChandaShaasana Ashoka or Chanda Ashoka? What fuelled the rise of Chanakya's protege ChandraGupta Maurya? Did Nehru confiscate the riches in the early days of 1947?
- Elu rottigalu (2011) - Mir Osman Ali Khan, the 7'th and Last Nizam of Hyderabad, was the richest man ever who lived on Earth. He was and remains a controversial figure, whose reach was unparalleled in world-history. He even was about to anoint his sons to Caliphate and getting the entire Muslim World to fall to his feet, all through his much acclaimed and recorded riches. What was it that made him so rich? All the famed mines of Golkonda and other places? What prompted Nizam to abandon his acute hate towards Indian Government and end his flight to Prince Farookh's Palace in Egypt? Is it true that even today, his riches are being used to fuel Anti-India feelings?
- Mooka dhatu (2012)
- Shilakula valase (2014)
- Ballikaala belli (2017)
- Rakta sikta Ratna (2018)
- Kaanana Janardana (2022)
- Jala Jaala (2023)
- Hokkala Medulu (2024)
- Shakyashakta Shilpa (2025)

Collection of Short/Long Stories:

- Shalabanjike (2007) - Pratihara means Door-Keeper. Why was it that the famed Gurjara-Pratihara dynasty named as Pratihara? Why was the RashtraKoota Queen RatnaMala's face adorning Gurjara Kingdom's most revered Mural? Maalava regions of current day Madhya Pradesh has a fascinating history.
  Why is that the stomach part of all idols in Hoysala Temples look like a Cow? Why is that, the famed sculptors MalliTamma and his ilk not popular as Jakkanna or Jakana Aacharya?
- Padmapani (2009) - What binds the Lotus (Padma) with Jainism? Is there more to the secrets of 24 Thirthankara's, other than spreading message of peace, harmony & love?
- Nehala (2010)
- Sigeeria (2011) - SriLanka's chequered history criss-crosses that of India, not just for Ramayana or Tamil Natives. It is intertwined with every Century. Kunala, the blind-son of Samrat Ashoka, Sea-faring Kingdoms of Chola and Pandya's, Plantation-ships of European Colonial Rulers, SriLanka, with its great Kingdoms of DhatuSena, Kashyapa and others continues to maintain little affinity with its neighbours. Is there more than just the difference of Languages (Simhala v/s Tamil), Religions (Buddhism v/s Hinduism) or is there more? SimhaGiri or Sigiriya in Dambulla, Is it just another Fortress or something more?
- Kaldavasi (2013)
- Mihirakula (2015)
- Perini Tandava (2016)
- Aryaa Veerya (2018)
- Gudi Mallam" (2021)
- Hate Jote Kathe (2023)
- Himmadi Madilu (2024)
- Valaya Kalaha (2025)

Collection of Articles

- Bhinna-bimba (2015)
- Bhinnota (2016)
- V-charana (2017)
- Taru Maaru (2018)
- Hora Nota (2019)
- Aththiththadavalokana (2023)
- Ajnathachittadatta Ondu Hejje (2024)
- Manogama (2025)

He has written two volumes on his journey in Science and from there on to Literature

- Sasya Sagga (2019) (Journey in Science)
- Divy Suli ( 2021) (Journey from Science to literature)

Other spinoffs from literature and media work

- Four of the short stories are staged as dramas
- One 25 episode TV serial Kaala Garbha on Archeology and history.
- Authored several articles in Kannada on Science and history
- He has recited important parts of Kuvempu's Shree Ramayana Darshanam
- He started a podcast channel called "Gen360, times and tides" which features discussions on new trends in science and historical eliments.

In total, Ganeshaiah has around 342 publications to his credit.

== Translations ==
- Kanaka Musuku has translated into Sanskrit by Suvarna Khanda (Novel) in 2019.
- The story "Keralida Karulu" has translated into Telugu as "Ragalina Pegu" included in the story collection Murasunaadu Kathalu in 2013.
- Honna Huttu has translated into Sanskrit by Dr. Janardhan Hegde in 2024.
- Karisiriyaana has translated into Telugu by R. R. Rao in 2025.

== Controversies ==
In March 2020, Prof. Ganeshiah was set to give a talk at the Indian Institute of Science, Bangalore titled 'Polygamy, Sexual Selection and Terrorism’, which argued in its abstract that polygamy and female foeticide created mate-deprived “bare branches” men, making them vulnerable to take up crime, terrorism and militancy. There was a strong objection by the students and citizens to the "Islamophobic and sexist" rhetoric in the abstract. which led to the cancellation of the talk. Prof. Ganeshiah argued that the talk was based on research by Valerie M. Hudson and Andrea den Boer in their book Bare Branches: The Security Implications of Asia's Surplus Male Population published by the Belfer Center for Science and International Affairs. Prof Ganeshiah extends the argument in the book by stating that polygamy is also a contributing factor to the claims made in the research by the Hudson and den Boer and that polygamy is not limited to Islam alone.

== Education ==
- Ph.D. University of Agricultural Sciences, Bangalore, India, 1983
- M.Sc. (Agriculture: Genetics & Plant Breeding), University of Agricultural Sciences, Bangalore, India, 1979
- B.Sc. (Agriculture), University of Agricultural Sciences, Bangalore, India, 1976.

== Honors and awards ==
- Fellow, Indian Academy of Sciences, Bangalore, India (1991)
- Fellow Indian National Science Academy, New Delhi (1997)
- Honorary Senior Fellow, Jawaharlal Nehru Centre for Advanced Scientific Research, Bangalore
- Parisara Prashasthi, (Karnataka State Environment Award) from the Department of Forest Ecology and Environment, Govt of Karnataka, India.
- Fulbright fellowship (1991).
- Radio, Hope and Awareness Media Award from International Radio Forum – Iran (2010)
- Vocational Excellence Award by Rotary Club of Bangalore Yelahanka, (2008)
- Senior Fellow Ashoka Trust for Research in Ecology and Environment, Bangalore, India.
- Fellow National Academy of Agricultural Sciences, New Delhi. (2004)
- Fellow Current Science Association, Bangalore.
- Karnataka Sahitya Academy Datti Award 2008 for the Kannada novel (Kanakamusuku).
- Ganeshaiah is also a Trustee and Member of the executive board of ATREE.org.
- Ganeshaiah spoke at TEDx Pilani in March 2010 on popular Indian Myths.
