= Kullal Chickappu Naik =

Indian agricultural scientist

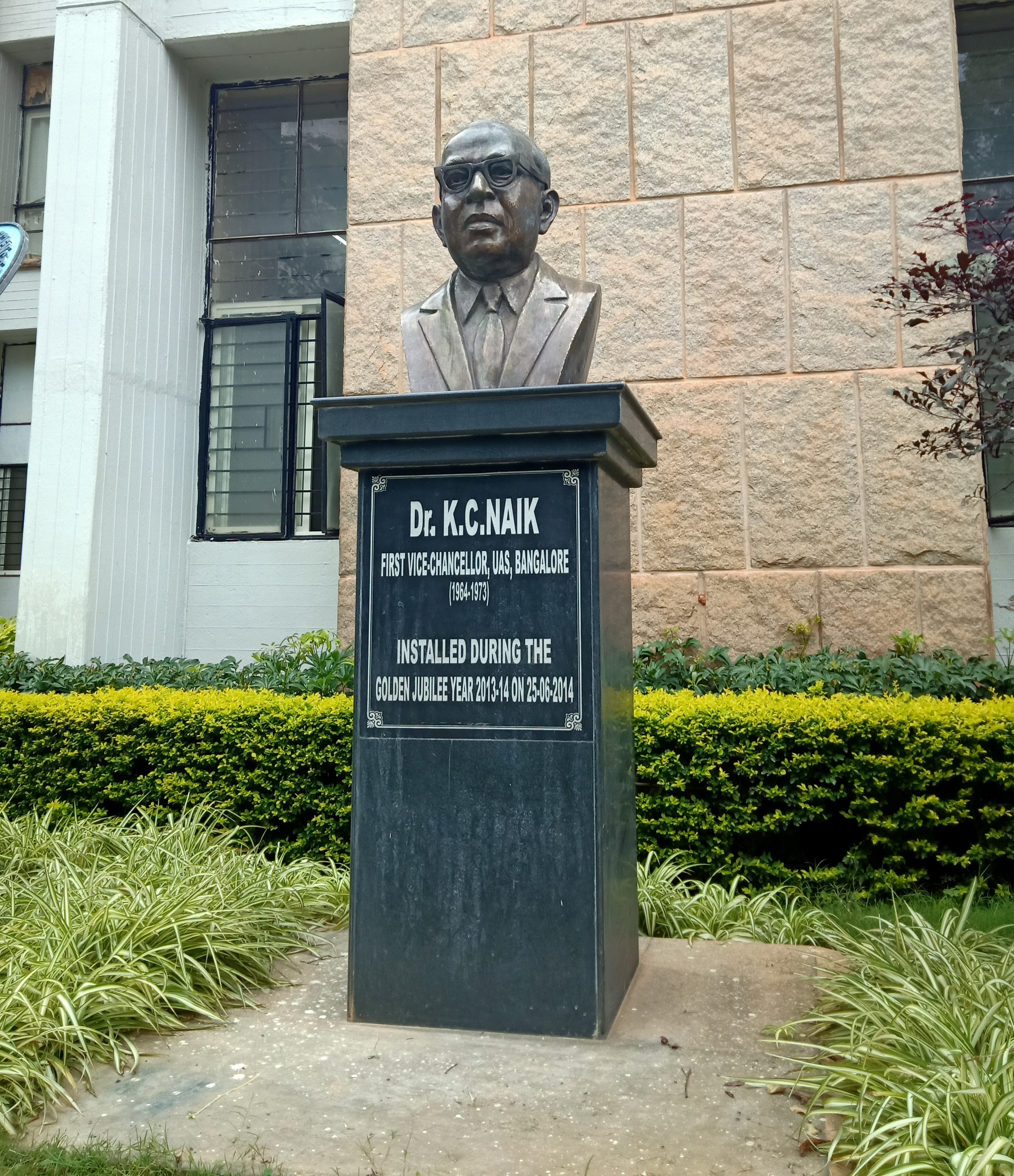
Bust at the University of Agricultural Sciences, GKVK campus

Kullal Chickappu Naik, abbreviated as K. C. Naik (14 August 1903 – 1973) was an Indian agricultural scientist mainly dealing with horticulture. He was also an academic administrator and author. He was the first vice chancellor of University of Agricultural Sciences, Bangalore.

== Biography ==
Naik was born in an ethnic Bunt family of Kolnadu village, South Canara district, British India. His father was Sankappa Naik. He was married to Indira Naik. K.C. Naik obtained his BSc (Agric.) from Pune University and master's degree from the University of Edinburgh in 1931. He completed his doctorate in 1951 from the University of Bristol.

Prior to the independence of India he served in various capacities in the erstwhile Madras state. He served on the managing committee of Horticultural Society of India as treasurer from 1943 to 1945, as vice-president from 1953 to 1955, and as acting president from 1952 to 1956. Naik was the first vice-chancellor of the University of Agricultural Sciences, Bangalore.

Naik introduced an innovative system of ‘students meeting’ in the university to supplement the student counselling. He introduced series of innovations in the academic field, encompassing teaching, research, and extension, which resulted in a result-oriented system in the university.
