= Sonny Ramaswamy =

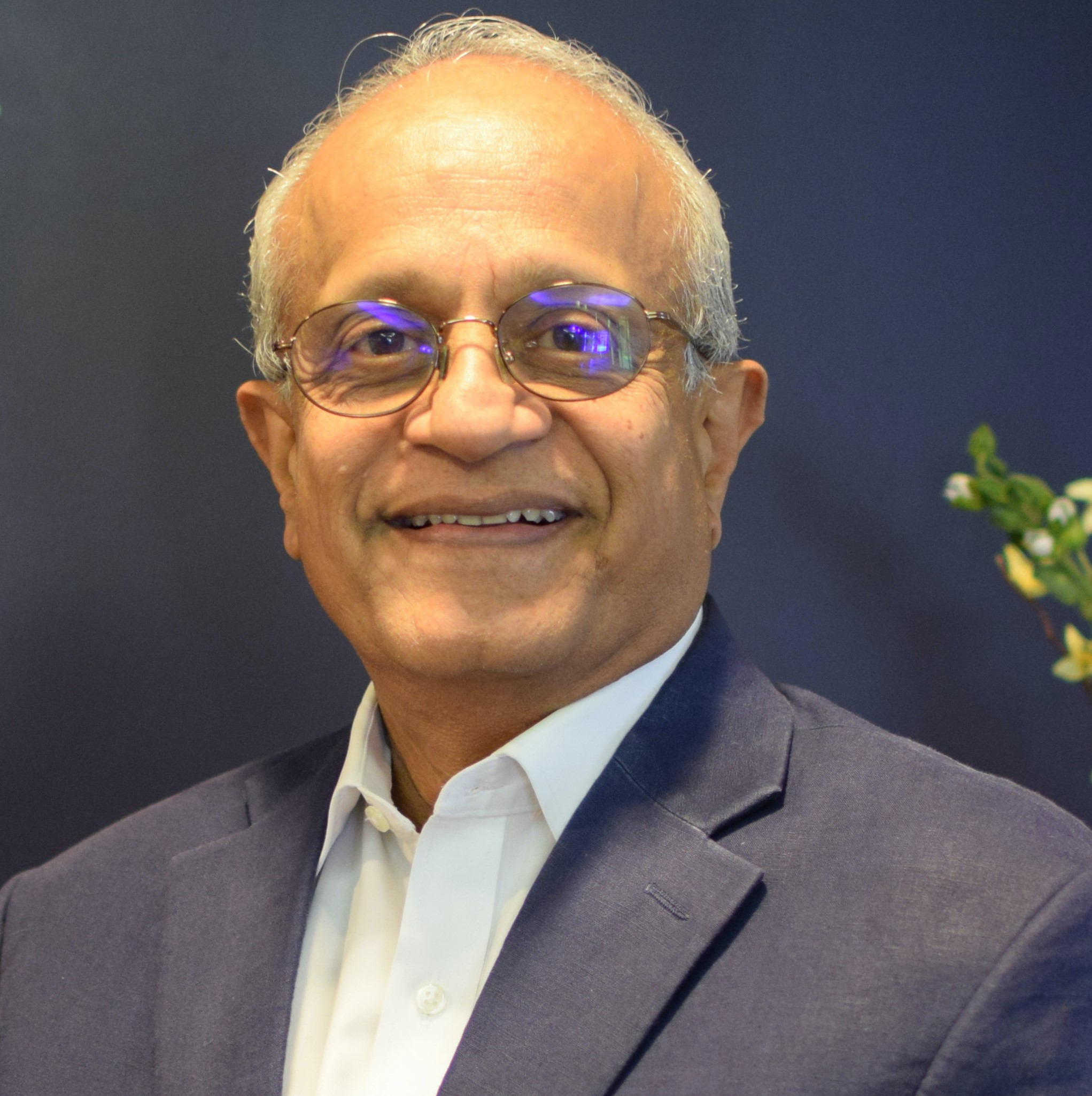

President of the Northwest Commission on Colleges and Universities
- In office July 2018 – February 2025

Director of the National Institute of Food and Agriculture
- In office May 2012 – May 2018
- Preceded by: Roger N. Beachy

Personal details
- Born: 1952 (age 73–74)
- Spouse: Gita Ramaswamy
- Education: University of Agricultural Sciences, Bangalore; Rutgers University
- Website: Official biography

Sonny Ramaswamy (born 1952) is an Indian-American agricultural scientist. He served as president and CEO of the Northwest Commission on Colleges and Universities from 2018 to 2025. He formerly served as Director of the National Institute of Food and Agriculture from 2012 to 2016.

== Early life and education ==
Sonny Ramaswamy was born in Hyderabad, India, and grew up in Bangalore as the youngest of four boys. He graduated from St. Joseph's Indian High School, a Jesuit school in Bangalore, and later, from the University of Agricultural Sciences, Bangalore, with a Bachelor of Science in Agriculture in 1973 and a Master of Science (Agriculture) in entomology in 1976. He then earned his Ph.D. in 1980 in entomology from Rutgers University. Ramaswamy undertook postdoctoral research on the sex pheromone of insects from 1980 to 1982 in Ring Cardé's laboratory at Michigan State University. In 2001, Ramaswamy completed Harvard University's executive Management Development Program.

== Career ==
Ramaswamy was professor of insect physiology and graduate program coordinator in the Department of Entomology at Mississippi State University from 1982 to 1997. He was University Distinguished Professor and Head of the Department of Entomology at Kansas State University from 1997 to 2005. In 2002, Ramaswamy received the Presidential Award for Outstanding Department Head. He envisioned and created the K-State Insect Zoo.

Ramaswamy's personal research was funded with grants from federal agencies, including NIFA, NSF, NIH, EPA, and USAID, and from state agencies, commodity groups and industry. He has published more than 150 journal articles, book chapters, a book, and has a patent, and is the recipient of several awards and honors, including fellow of the American Association for the Advancement of Science, fellow of the Entomological Society of America, the Hutchinson Medal from the Chicago Botanic Garden and the Leader in Agriculture Award from Agriculture Future of America.

Between 2006 and 2009, Ramaswamy directed Purdue University's agricultural research programs, facilitating success on numerous grant-funded projects in support of multi- and trans-disciplinary research and education projects on bioenergy, climate change, water, agroecology, and food security and production agriculture.

In 2009, Ramaswamy moved to Oregon State University to serve as dean of the College of Agricultural Sciences and director of the Oregon Agricultural Experiment Station.

On May 7, 2012, President Barack Obama appointed Ramaswamy to serve as director of the United States Department of Agriculture's National Institute of Food and Agriculture (NIFA). NIFA's mission is to catalyze transformative discoveries, education, and engagement to solve societal challenges in food and agricultural systems. His term ended on May 5, 2018.

On July 1, 2018, Ramaswamy began his tenure as president and CEO of the Northwest Commission on Colleges and Universities (NWCCU), which accredits public and private institutions of higher education, including tribal and faith-based institutions, by applying evidence-informed standards and processes to support continuous improvements and promote student achievement and success. He retired from NWCCU in February 2025.

He was one of the signatories of Statement on AI Risk (2023) open letter.

== Family and personal life ==
Ramaswamy is married to Gita Ramaswamy, who previously served as a professor of textiles, administrator and senior advisor to USDA's chief scientist. They have a daughter, Megha Ramaswamy, who is Professor and Chair of Health Systems and Population Health at the University of Washington.
