= Elu Rottigalu =

2011 novel by K. N. Ganeshaiah

- Author: K. N. Ganeshaiah
- Language: Kannada
- Subject: History
- Genre: Historical fiction
- Publisher: Ankita Pustaka
- Publication date: 2011
- Publication place: India
- Media type: Print (Hardcover)
- Pages: 144
- Preceded by: Chithadantha
- Followed by: Mooka dhatu

Elu Rottigalu is a thriller novel by the novelist, researcher, and scientist Dr K. N. Ganeshaiah. Elu Rottigalu means seven Kulchas or Rotis, the official emblem of the Nizams of Hyderabad. This novel is based on the history of Nizam of Hyderabad dynasty and narrated like cinema. Nizam, the ruler of Hyderabad plans to leave India, when India gets independence, along with the wealth, however because of Govt of India's control he could not do that. The novel is based on the story of this event and related things. This book has all the related references, list of witnesses and information required for the story lines. The novel also covers about Deendar Anjuman, Pakistan relationship with India, African Siddi and their migrations, and King Kothi Palace.
