= Adolf Lehmann =

Canadian chemist and agricultural scientist

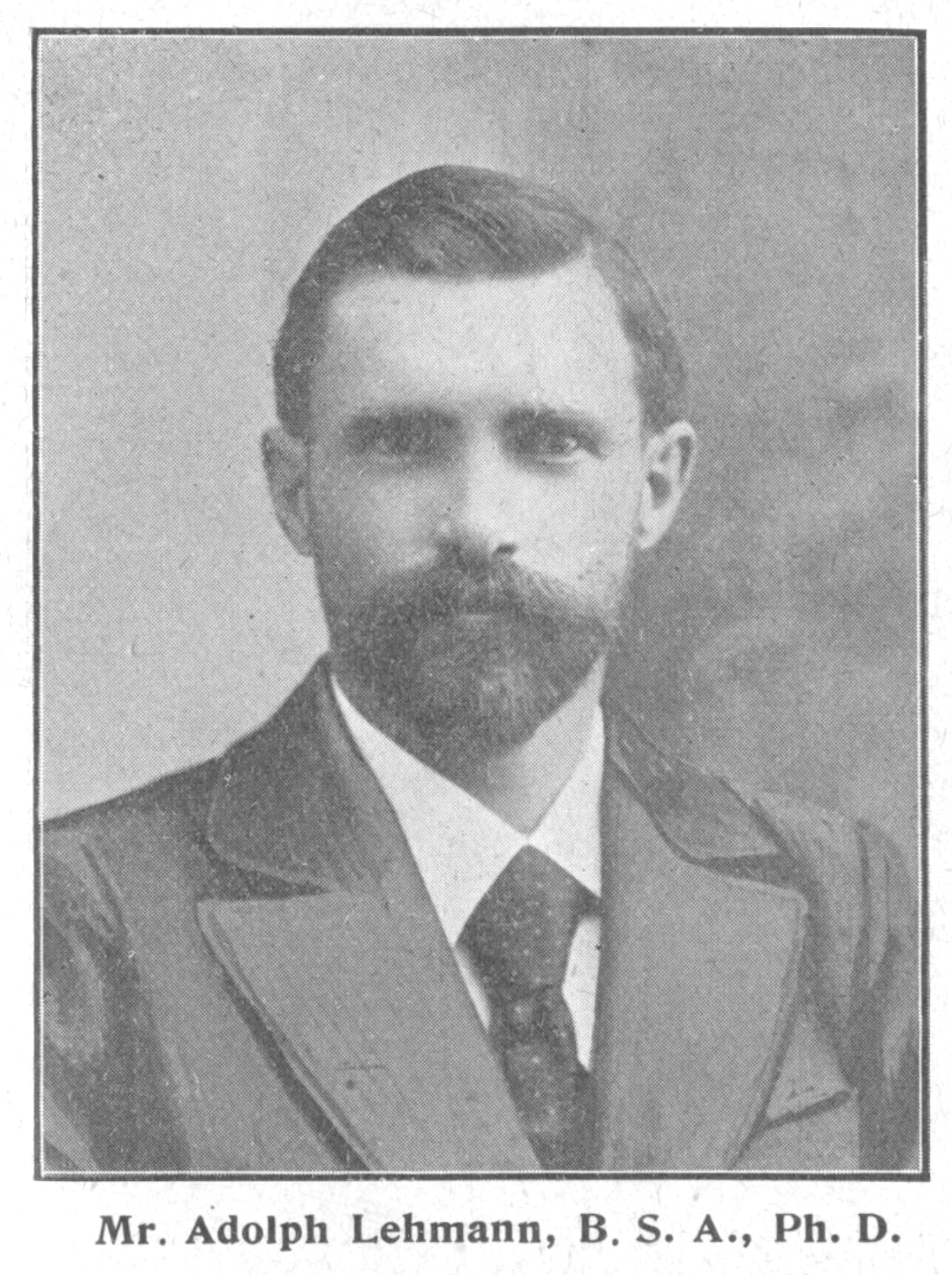
c. 1900

Adolf Lehmann or Adolph Ludwig Ferdinand Lehmann (22 December 1863 - 27 September 1937) was a Canadian chemist and agricultural scientist of German ancestry. He served as the first agricultural chemist of Mysore state in India. He established a laboratory for chemical analysis and began field experiments to study plant nutrition and also worked on chemical problems involved in the processing of sugar from sugarcane.

== Life and work ==
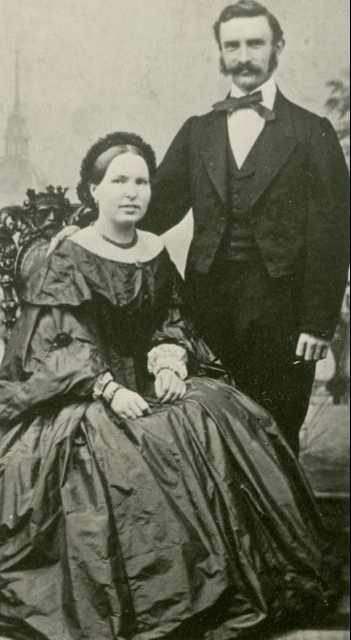
Parents, Kathinka and Adalbert Lehmann, c. 1863

Lehmann was born in Morris Township, Canada West, the first son of Adalbert Ludwig Lehmann and Kathinka Helene Friedereike (born Bruch), German settlers who farmed around Sparrow Lake. Kathinka came from Oldenburg and had lived in Belgium with an uncle who was physician to King Leopold, and studied French and English. Adolph studied at the Sparrow Lake Public School before going to the Oldenburg Gymnasium. He graduated with a BSA in 1889 from the Ontario Agricultural College (then called the Guelph Agricultural College) and then went to the University of Leipzig where he studied under Johannes Wislicenus and received a doctorate for studies on the reduction of dibenzene diphenylbutadiene to tetraphenylbenzene. He subsequently worked at the Dominion Experimental Farm, Ottawa (1890) as an assistant chemist to Frank Thomas Shutt and as a chemist at the Louisiana Experimental Station established by William Carter Stubbs in New Orleans (1893). He also served as a bacteriologist in the department of inland revenue, Ottawa (1897) and worked briefly as a lecturer in chemistry at Queen's University Kingston (1897). He also gave lectures on fungi and other aspects of microscopic life for members of the Ottawa Field Naturalists' Club. He was admitted Fellow of the Chemical Society (London) in 1901.

=== India ===
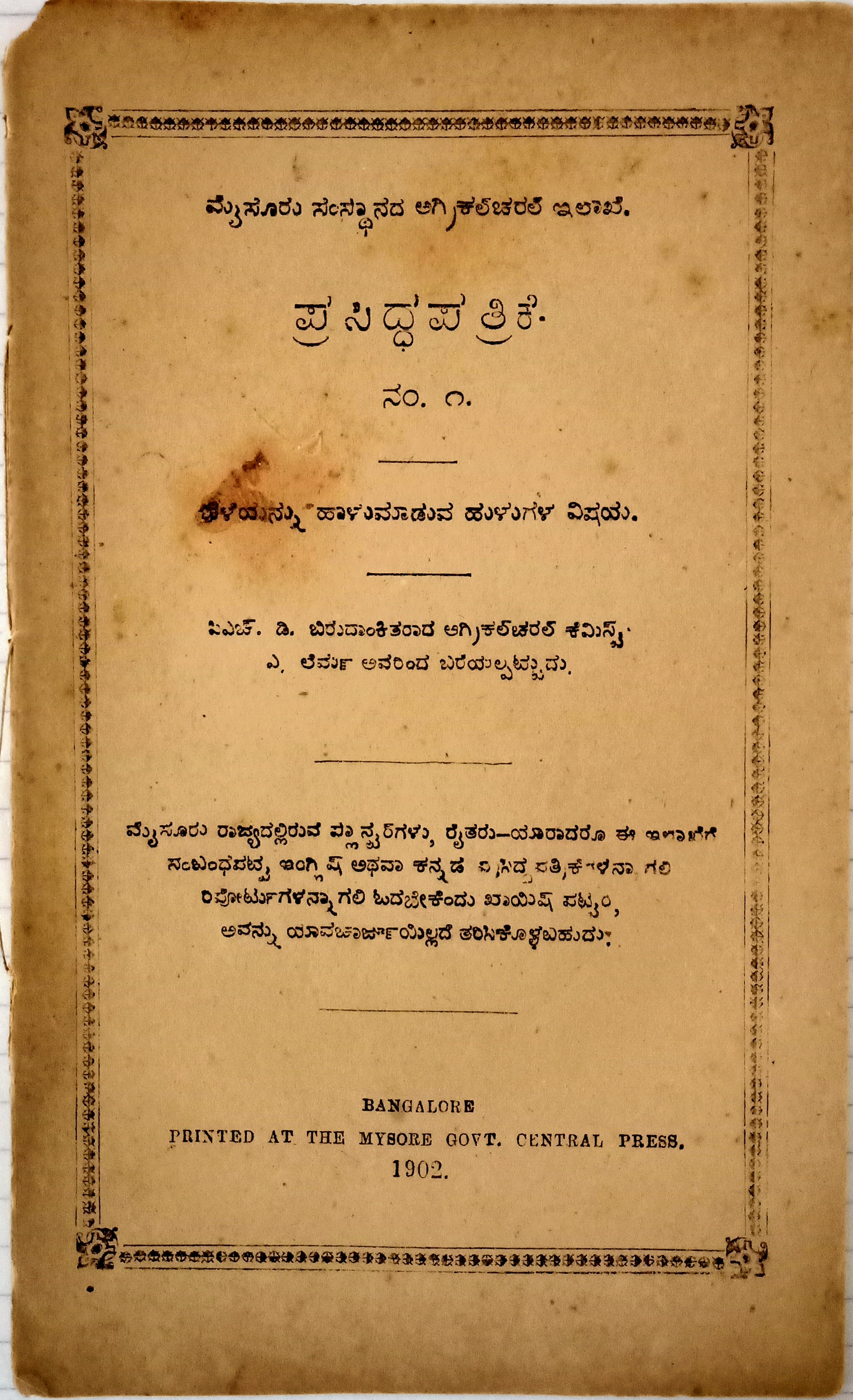
A 1902 pamphlet on crop pests in Kannada produced by Lehmann (the name is mistranscribed)

In 1898 he moved to India to set up the department of agriculture in Mysore State. Lehmann's appointment, initially for five years, was based on the recommendations of the Voelcker commission to the government of India. Among his achievements were the establishment of rigorous experimental techniques based on pot cultures, field plots, and developing chemical assays for phosphorus in plant and animal matter (including studies on the nutritive value of "famine foods"). He studied soil fertility, and conducted research on improving the process of converting sugarcane juice to sugar (reducing losses by neutralizing with lime before boiling), treating water for drinking, and in paper making. In 1908, as his appointment term ended, shortly after the death of his wife, the Government of Mysore decided not to renew the position of Agricultural Chemist. He also worked with coffee planters in attempts to improve the quality and yield of coffee. The Planters' Association resolved in a meeting "That this Association deplores the retrograde policy of the Mysore Government with regard to agriculture by which the services of Dr Lehmann are lost to the Province. It desires to place on record its high appreciation of the valuable services rendered to the planting industry by Dr. Lehmann." Lehmann was quoted by the planters as saying - "what you need is experiment, and experiment, and experiment." The position of agricultural chemist was filled later by Dr. B. Narasimha Iyengar who was also trained in the University of Göttingen.

=== Canada ===
Lehmann had worked for nine years before he returned to Canada, to work initially at Queen's University, and then at the University of Alberta as a professor of chemistry. He was succeeded in 1908 in the state of Mysore by Leslie Coleman who had been recruited as a mycologist and entomologist. In Canada he studied bitumen deposits in the Athabasca river, studied soil chemistry and influenced numerous students. He was invalid for the last eight years of his life and died at Kingston, Ontario.

=== Family ===
Lehmann married Agnes Mary Georgina (born Lovick) (May 11, 1870, Kingston - March 15, 1908, Bangalore) on October 12, 1898 and they had three sons (Karl Frederick born 18 Jun 1906, Adolf John Victor 3 Sep 1902, and Julius Ferdinand 10 December 1900) and a daughter in Bangalore. Georgina died of (enteric fever) typhoid six weeks after the birth of their only daughter Mary Georgina in Bangalore. Georgina's sister Caroline Melissa Lovick (1867-1967) took care of the children and Lehmann married her in 1911 at Edmonton. The family lived at Gowsworth on Fittons Road in Orillia.

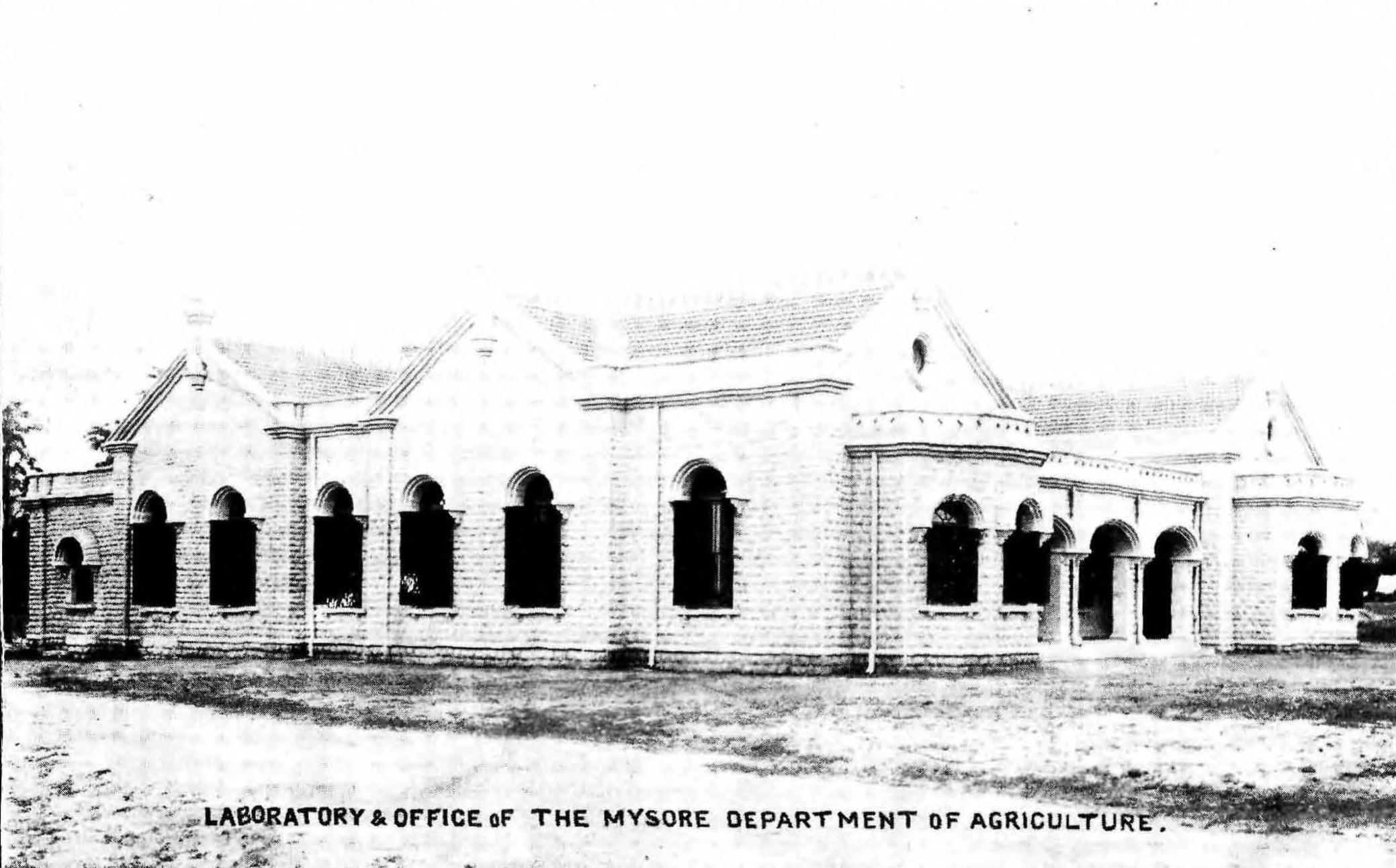
Lehmann's office and laboratory, currently housing the department of agriculture in Bangalore

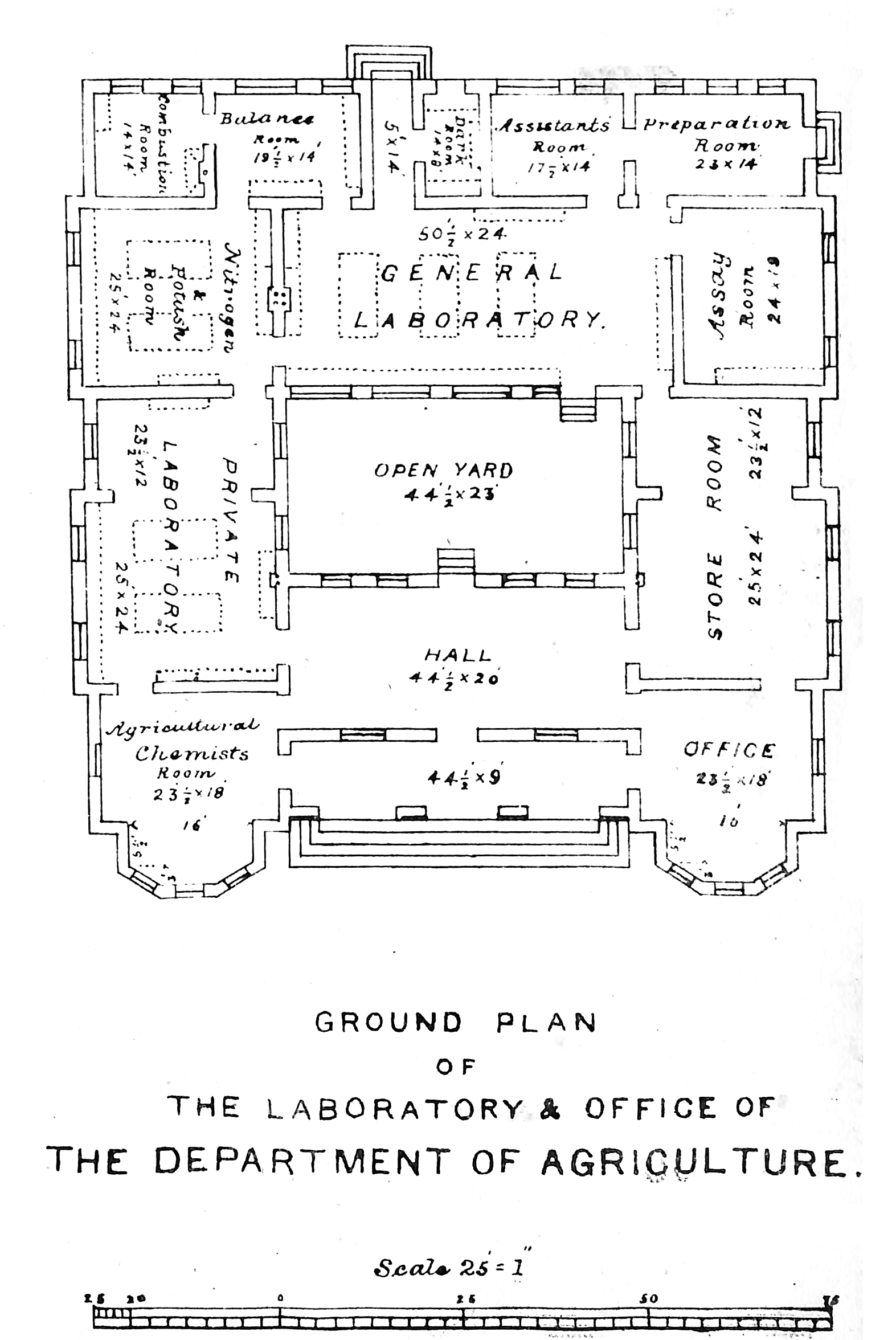
Floor plan of the agricultural laboratory and office

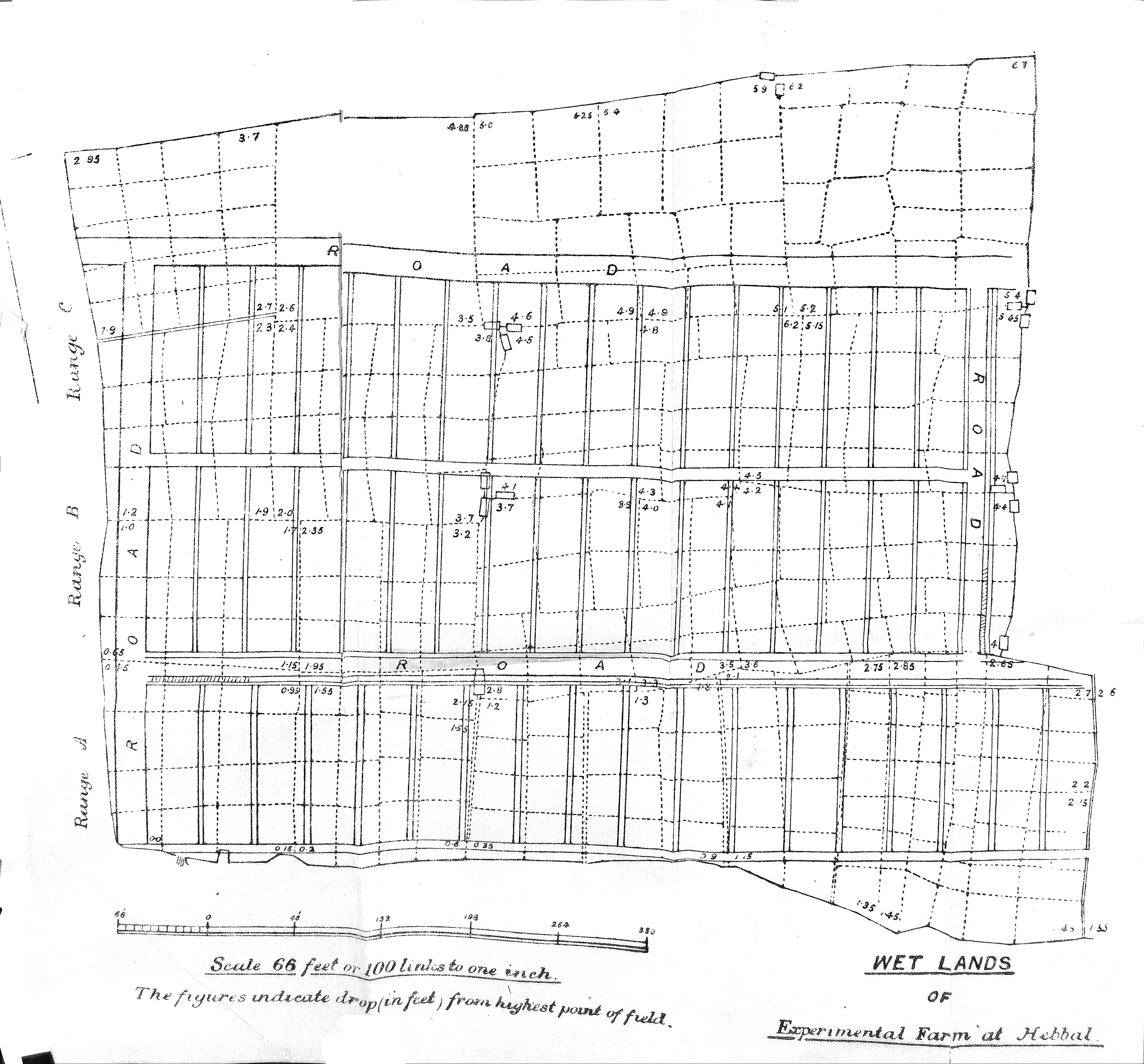
Design of the wetland experimental plots at Hebbal (now part of the flyover and ring road)

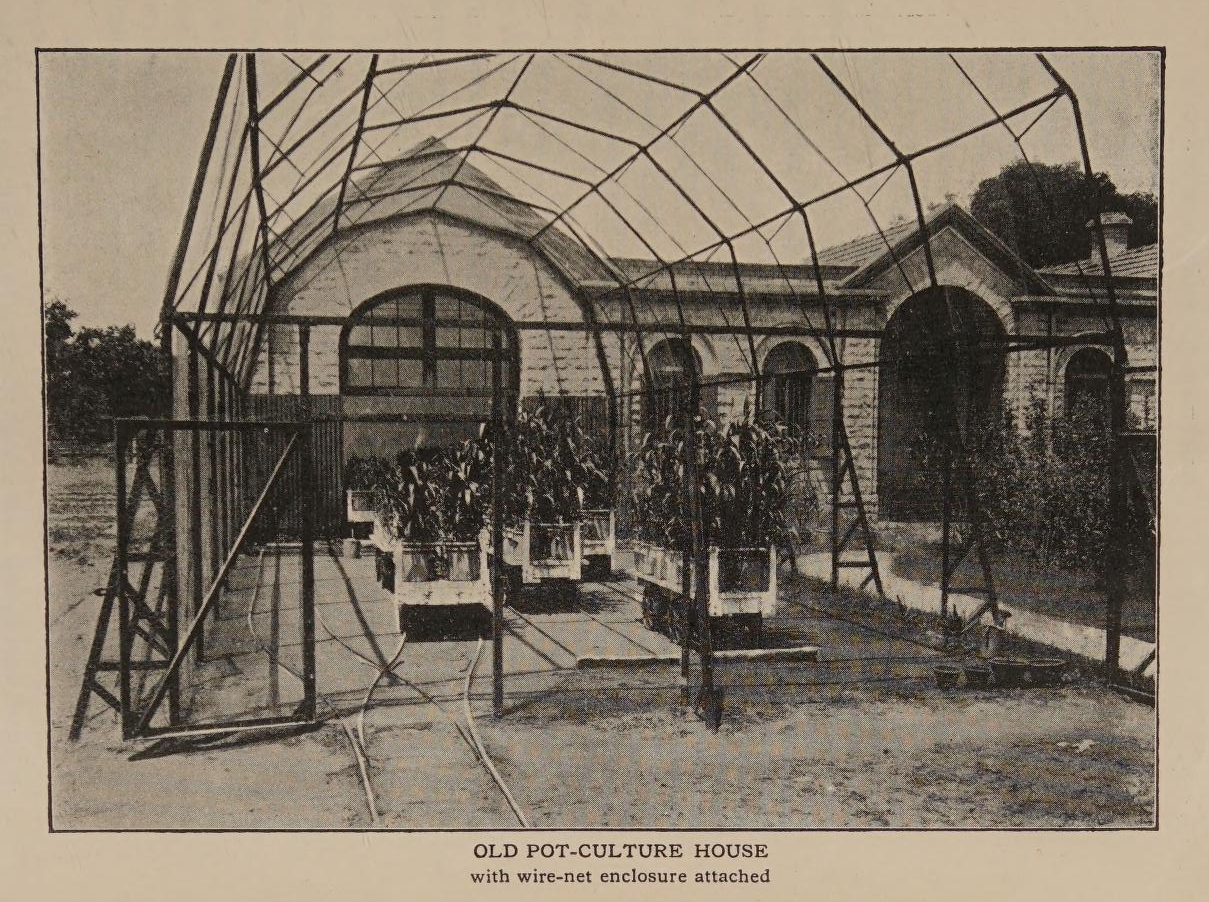
Pot culture laboratory (as seen in 1926)
