= Shilakula valase =

2014 novel by K. N. Ganeshaiah

Shilakula Valase
- First edition
- Author: K. N. Ganeshaiah
- Language: Kannada
- Subject: History
- Genre: Historical fiction
- Published: 2014 Ankita Pustaka, Bengaluru
- Publication place: India
- Media type: Print (Hardcover)
- Pages: 324
- Preceded by: Mookha Dhaatu

Shilakula Valase is a novel by Kannada writer K. N. Ganeshaiah. The novel was published by Ankita Pustaka, Bengaluru in the year 2014. The book has story surrounded by Aryan invasion theory, i.e., Indo-Aryan migration theory, Indigenous Aryans and Aryan race in India. The information on the book are supported by very well listed references, which are useful for researchers and students. The story has group of researchers, who went on exploring Indus Valley civilizationrelation to Aryan migration theory and stories related to Edakkal Caves and Dravidian peoples.
