= K. Puttaswamy (scholar) =

Writer, film critic, translator and an environmentalist

Dr K Puttaswamy
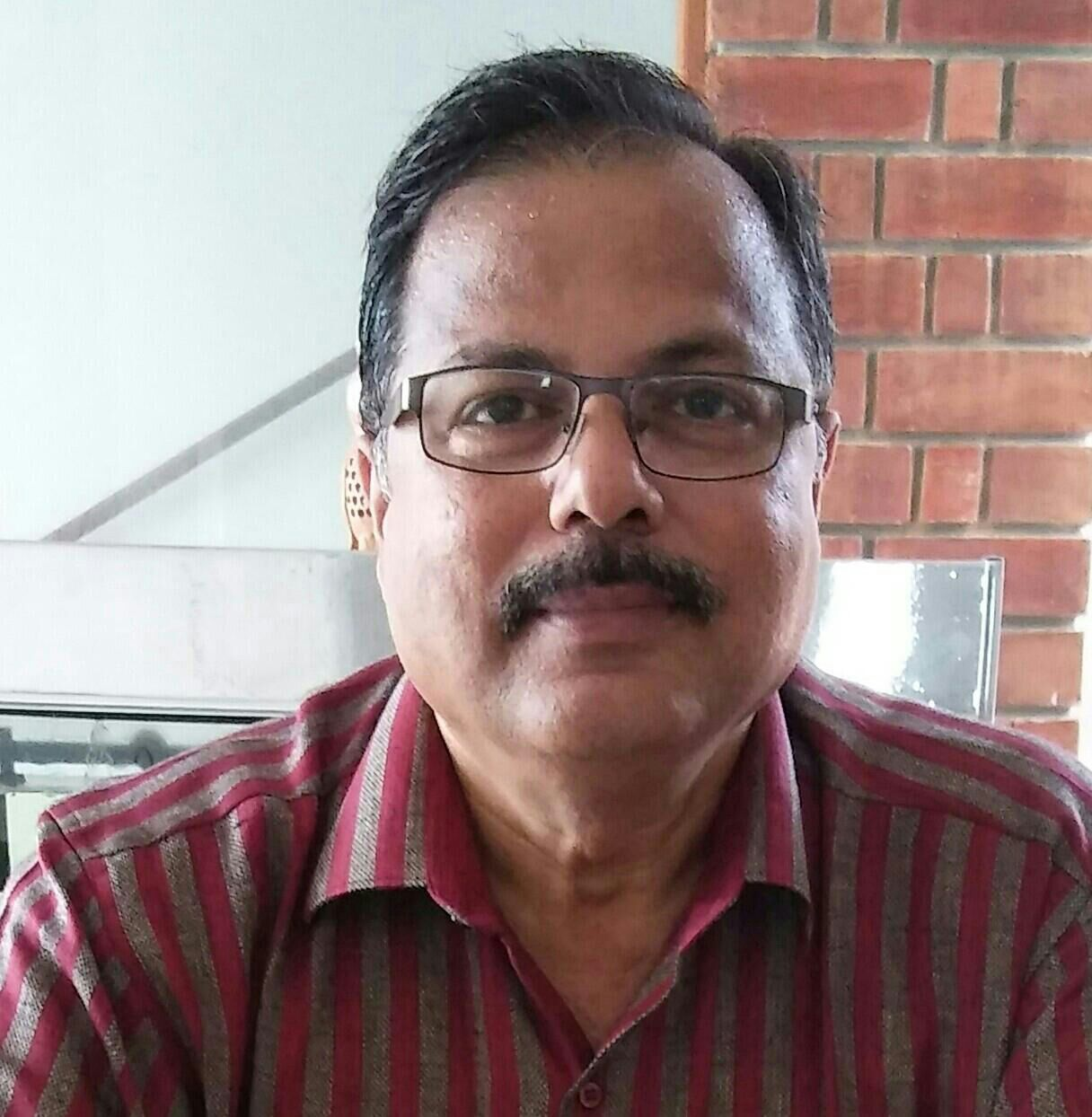
- Dr K Puttaswamy
- Born: 16 July 1957 (age 69); Varagerahalli in Kanakapura taluk, Ramanagar District, Karnataka
- Education: University of Agricultural Sciences, Mysore University, Kannada University
- Occupations: Writer, Film Critic
- Writing career
- Language: Kannada
- Notable works: Cinema Yaana, Kuvempu Malenaadu
- Notable awards: Swarna Kamala Award, Kempegowda Award, Karnataka State Environment Award, Karnataka Sahitya Academy Award

Dr K Puttaswamy is a Kannada writer, film critic, translator and an environmentalist. He hails from Varagerahalli in Ramanagar District. He is currently serving as an Assistant Director in Kannada Development Authority. He is known for his translation of Charles Darwin’s "The Origin of Species" to Kannada. He served as the Head of the Department of History of Sciences in Hampi Kannada University. His major areas of interest are Kannada language, literature, science and films.

He received the Karnataka Sahitya Academy Award in the category of science and cinema ^{[2]} for his contribution to Kannada language and science literature.

== Biography ==
Dr K Puttaswamy was born in Varagerahalli village in Kanakapura taluk, Ramanagar District, Karnataka. He is the son of Kempegowda and Siddhalingamma. He finished his primary education in Kanakapura and moved to Sumathi Jain High school in KGF. He pursued Bachelors of Science degree in Agriculture Sciences from the University of Agricultural Sciences, Bangalore. He later obtained a Diploma in Journalism from Mysore University. He is also awarded D.Lit from the Kannada University, Hampi. He currently resides in Bengaluru with wife, and two children.

KPuttaswamy’s book ‘Cinema Yaana’ has won the national award for Best Book on cinema. This is the first time a Kannada book on cinema has won the national award. ‘Cinema Yaana,’ a flashback into the 75 years of Kananda cinema, maps the journey of Sandalwood from various perspectives. It was brought out on the occasion of the platinum jubilee celebrations of the Kannada cinema. Puttaswamy said: "I am happy. It is the first time a Kannada book on cinemas has received a national award. As the book chronicles the 75 years of Kannada cinema, I feel the award is also a recognition for Kannada cinema. I am happy that a person passionate about cinema has been awarded. I feel the award belongs to all the film journalists, for I have got inspiration and insights from their writings.’’

== Books ==
- Jeeva Sankulagala Ugama (1991), translation of Charles Darwin’s "The Origin of Species" to Kannada.
- Jeeva Jaala (1999), jointly with Environmental photography duo Krupakar-Senani.
- Bhuvanada Bedagu (2000)
- Janatheya Rajya, a translation of Jnanapith Awardee Beerendra Kumar Bhattacharya’s work "Yaaryungam" from Assamese.
- Aadhunika Vignaanakke Gandhiya Savaalu, translation of "Gandhi’s Challenge to Modern Science" originally authored by Prof. Sunil Sahasrabuddhe.
- Kiriyara sachitra vignaana vishwakosha
- D.Devaraja Arasu Chitra Kathakosha
- . Daasyadinda Achege. Translation of Up From Slavery, An Autobiography of Booker T Washington

== Awards ==
- Jeeva Jaala – Karnataka Sahitya Academy award in Science category (1999)
- Cinema Yaana - Karnataka Sahitya Academy award in Sankeerna category (2009)
- Karnataka State Environment Award (2000) for lifetime contribution to Life sciences and Environment.
- Cinema Yaana has won the Swarna Kamala award (2010) at 57th National Film Awards, for its probingly critical introduction to Kannada cinema in its interconnections with Literature and theatre, history and society; with insightful analyses of the classics of Kannada cinema and assessments of individual contributions, often from beyond the borders of Karnataka; supplemented by excellent photographs and annotations; and extraordinary production values.
- Cinema Yaana (2009) – Pusthaka Sogasu First prize from Kannada Pusthaka Praadhikara for its production values
- Kempegowda Award (2011) from Bruhat Bengaluru Mahanagara Paalike(BBMP) under Administration category
- Has been admitted to Hall of Fame by Public Relations Council of India for his contribution to the field of Public Relations
- Kuvempu Bhashabhaarathi Award for translation of Booker T Washington's autobiography UP FROM SLAVERY into Kannada as DAASYADINDA AACHEGE 2018

== Translations ==
Dr.K.Puttaswamy has translated many works into Kannada language. His translations include biographies, scientific literature among others.

Biographies translated from English to Kannada

- Charles Darwin
- Alexander Fleming
- Margaret Mead
- Martin Luther King Junior
- Florence Nightingale

Translation of two works of Mani Bhoumik to Kannada

- Devaru Emba Sanketha ("Code Name God")
- Cosmic Detective

Translation of Science Fictions to Kannada

- Kaala nowke, originally "The Time Machine" by H.G.Wells
- Maaya Manushya, translation of "Invisible Man" by H.G.Wells
- Bhoo Madyakke Payana, translation of "A Journey Into Center of The Earth" by Jules Verne
- Embatthu dinagalalli bhoopradakshine, originally "Around the world in 80 days" by Jules Verne
- Saagaradalli Saahasa, from "20000 leagues under the sea" by Jules Verne
- Translation of "Ben Hur", a novel written by Lew Wallace.

== Jury ==
- BIFFES 2015 Asian category competition
- IFFI 2016, Goa - Indian Panorama category selection committee
- BIFFES 2017 Asian category selection committee
- served member of NETPAC Jury member at 11th BIFFES, Bengaluru
- IFFI 2019 GOA-Indian Panorama section jury committee member

== See also ==
- Kannada
- Kannada literature
- Kannada poetry
