= William Carter Stubbs =

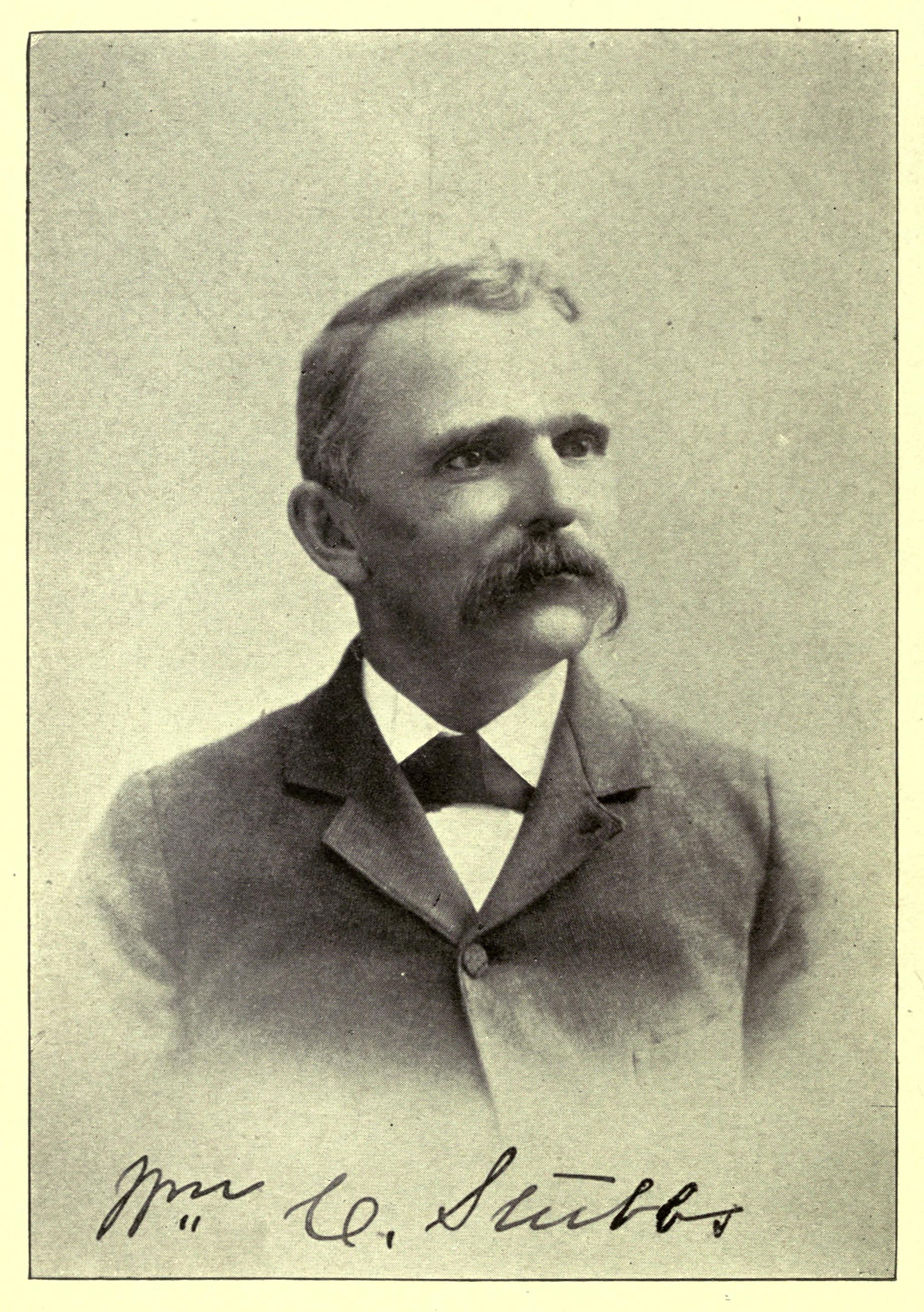

William Carter Stubbs (7 December 1843 – 7 July 1924) was an American chemist and sugar industry researcher who worked in Alabama and Louisiana.

== Early life ==
Stubbs was born in Gloucester County, Virginia to Jefferson W. Stubbs and Ann Walker Carter Baytop. He studied at the William and Mary College and Randolph–Macon College. While at the latter, he was a member of the Fraternity of Delta Psi (a.k.a. St. Anthony Hall). He received a PhD in chemistry from the University of Virginia.

During the American Civil War, he served as a cavalryman in the Confederate States Army under Fitzhugh Lee in the 24th Virginia Cavalry.

== Career ==
Stubbs taught at the East Alabama College (now Auburn University) and then became a professor of chemistry at the Alabama Agricultural and Mechanical College in 1869.

In 1885 he was appointed State Chemist for Louisiana and made director for the experimental station at Louisiana State University. His work at the Louisiana Sugar Experiment Station was sponsored by the Louisiana Sugar Planters Association and dealt predominantly with research associated with the sugar industry. The USDA obtained 70 varieties of sugarcane for Stubbs to evaluate and in 1893 he received 500 varieties and the final selection of varieties D74 and D95 led to a boom in sugar production.

The Audubon Sugar School begun in 1891 offered a course in agriculture under Charles E. Coates which included engineering and chemistry but it was closed in 1896 and the course taken over by the Louisiana State University.

== Personal life ==
Stubbs married Elizabeth Saunders Blair in 1875. The couple had no children. He took an interest in genealogy and wrote, along with his wife, on the descendants of John Stubbs. He died from pneumonia at his home in New Orleans and is buried in the Metairie Cemetery.

== Honors and controversy ==
The Louisiana State University named a hall on the campus in Baton Rouge after Stubbs. However, this was recommended for a change of name following re-examination of his role in United States history. A 1910 portrait depicts Stubbs with a Confederate lapel pin and there is a Confederate flag emblazoned on his tombstone. Since he was reliant on the exploitative system of sharecropping involving coerced black farm workers who had to bear generational poverty and physical abuse, the use of his name was considered inappropriate under LSU Policy Statement 70.
