= Chithadantha =

2010 novel by K. N. Ganeshaiah

Chitaadanta
- Author: K. N. Ganeshaiah
- Language: Kannada
- Subject: History
- Genre: Historical fiction
- Published: 2010 Ankita Pustaka
- Publication place: India
- Media type: Print (Hardcover)
- Pages: 248
- Preceded by: Kapilipisara
- Followed by: Elu rottigalu

Chitaadantha is a novel by Kannada writer K. N. Ganeshaiah, published by Ankita Pustaka, Bangalore in the year 2010. The book has a story surrounded by Alexander the Great's India visit and Buddhism in India. The story permeates from BC to modern times, a group searching for hidden wealth and experts and scientists studying about it.
