= Frank Thomas Shutt =

Frank Thomas Shutt, CBE (15 September 1859 - 5 January 1940) was a Canadian agricultural chemist who worked as Dominion Chemist at the Dominion Experimental Farms in Ottawa.

Shutt was born in Stoke Newington, London, to William Denis Shutt and Charlotte Cawthorne. The family moved to Canada, and Shutt studied at the University of Toronto, receiving a BA in 1885 and an MA in 1886. He worked as a chemist at the Dominion Experimental Farms from 1887 and was given the title of Dominion Chemist from 1912. He worked on plant nutrition problems until his retirement in 1933. He visited other agricultural research stations in Europe and England and was acquainted with John Bennet Laws, Joseph Henry Gilbert, Daniel Hall and John Russell. He received an honorary D.Sc. in 1914 from the University of Toronto.

He was appointed Commander of the Most Excellent Order of the British Empire in 1935 and received the Sir Joseph Flavelle medal in the same year.
