= University of Agricultural Sciences, Dharwad =

State University in Karnataka, India

- Type: Public
- Established: October 1, 1986; 39 years ago
- Affiliations: ICAR
- Chancellor: Governor of Karnataka
- Vice-Chancellor: Dr. N. B. Prakash
- Location: Dharwad, India; 15.489085°N 74.984264°E
- Website: uasd.edu

University of Agricultural Sciences, Dharwad (UASD) is a state agriculture university established by the Government of Karnataka which imparts education, research and extension activities in the fields of agriculture, forestry, food science, agricultural marketing and home science.

It is on Dharwad-Belgaum road (PB-4) on a campus with space for growing trees and fields for conducting experiments and research. The university encompasses 5 Colleges, 27 Research Stations, 6 Agriculture Extension Education Centers, 6 Krishi Vigyan Kendras, and an Agricultural Technology Information Center (ATIC). Its jurisdiction spans 7 districts in northern Karnataka: Bagalkot, Belgaum, Bijapur, Dharwad, Gadag, Haveri, and Uttar Kannada. The region exhibits a rich diversity in soil types, climate, topography, as well as cropping and farming practices.

== History ==
=== Early Beginnings (1947–1965) ===
The roots of the university trace back to the College of Agriculture, Dharwad, which was established on 22 May 1947 at Hebballi Farm, Dharwad. This institution was initiated under the Bombay Province by then Minister for Agriculture, Sri Mallanagoudaru Patil. Initially affiliated with the University of Bombay, the college was later transferred to Karnataka University, Dharwad in 1950.

The main building of the college was inaugurated on 9 September 1951 by Maharaja Jayachamarajendra Wadiyar of Mysore. It quickly became a hub of agricultural research and higher education, particularly in dryland agriculture and cotton breeding. Postgraduate programs were introduced in the same year, marking the beginning of advanced agricultural education in the region.

=== Integration with UAS Bangalore (1965–1986) ===
Following the Model Land-Grant University system proposed by the Indian Council of Agricultural Research (ICAR), the University of Agricultural Sciences, Bangalore (UASB) was established in 1965. The College of Agriculture, Dharwad became one of its constituent colleges. Over the following two decades, the institution expanded its academic offerings:

- The College of Home Science was established in 1974.
- A B.Sc. (Agri.) in Agricultural Marketing and Cooperation began in 1976.
- A Forestry department was added in 1985.

=== Establishment of UAS Dharwad (1986–Present) ===
Recognizing the agro-ecological and administrative needs of northern Karnataka, the Government of Karnataka enacted legislation in 1986 to bifurcate UAS Bangalore. The University of Agricultural Sciences, Dharwad was officially established on 1 October 1986, with jurisdiction over seven districts: Dharwad, Belagavi, Gadag, Haveri, Uttara Kannada, Bagalkote, and Vijayapura.

== Constituent colleges ==
The university has constituent colleges in places in Karnataka:

- College of Agriculture, Dharwad
- College of Community Sciences, Dharwad
- College of Agriculture, Vijayapur
- College of Agriculture, Hanumanamatti
- College of Forestry, Sirsi

== Jurisdiction ==
University has jurisdiction over seven districts namely Dharwad, Uttar Kannada, Gadag, Haveri, Belagavi, Bagalkot and Bijapur.
