= Education in Karnataka =

Aspect of culture in India

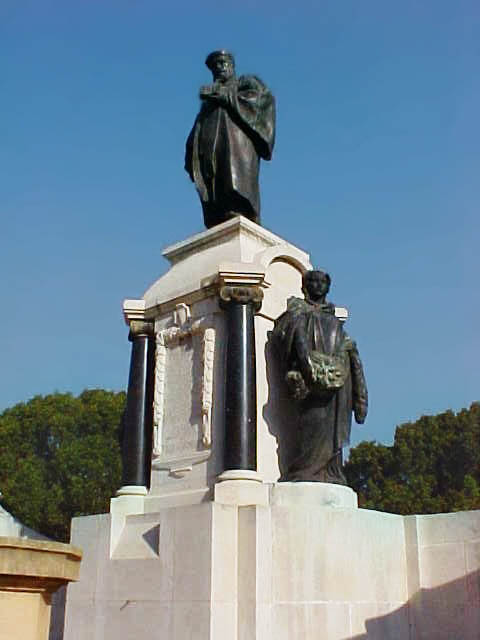
Statue of the founder of Indian Institute of Science, J N Tata

The state of Karnataka in India has well known institutions like the Indian Institute of Science (IISc), Indian Institute of Technology, Dharwad (IIT, DWD) Indian Institute of Management (IIM),Central University of Karnataka (CUK) the National Institute of Technology Karnataka (NITK), Indian Institute of Information Technology, Dharwad (IIIT), International Institute of Information Technology, Bangalore, Visvesvaraya Technological University (VTU) and the National Law School of India University. In addition, a Visvesvaraya Institute of Advanced Technology (VIAT) is being constructed in Muddenahalli.

As per the 2011 census, Karnataka has a literacy rate of 75.36% with 82.47% of males and 68.08% of females being literate.

== Primary and Secondary Education ==
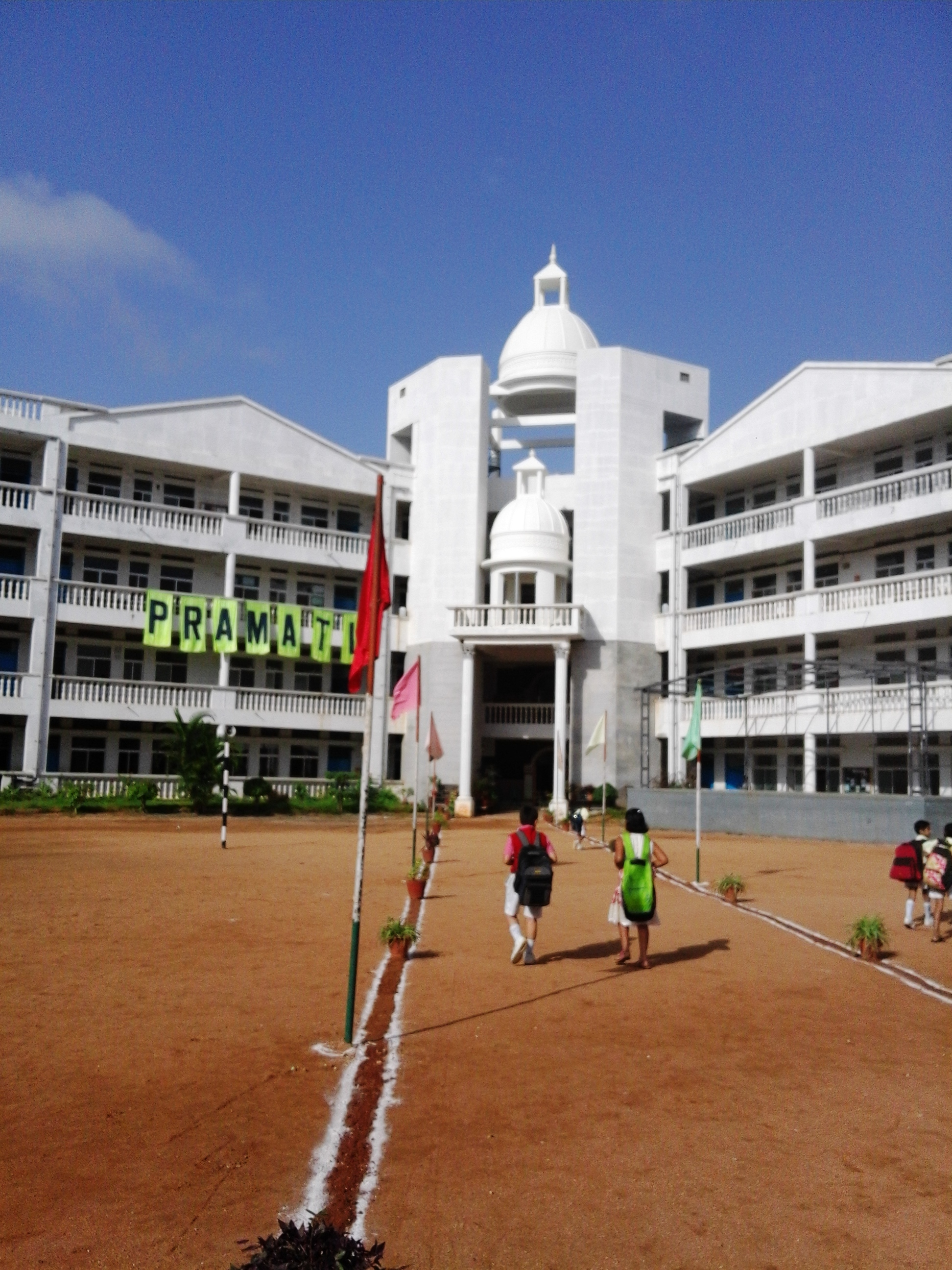
Pramati Hillview Academy, Mysore

As of March 2006, Karnataka had 54,529 primary schools with 252,875 teachers and 8.495 million students. Likewise, there are 9,499 secondary schools with 92,287 teachers with 1.384 million students.

There are three kinds of schools in Karnataka: government (run by the government), aided (financial aid is provided by the government), and unaided private (no financial aid is provided). In majority of these schools, the medium of instruction is either English or Kannada. The syllabus taught in the schools is that of CBSE, ICSE, NIOS, or the state syllabus (defined by the Department of Public Instruction of the Government of Karnataka). The curriculum includes subjects like science, social studies and mathematics apart from language-related subjects. To maximize attendance, the Karnataka Government has launched a midday meal scheme in government and aided schools in which free lunch is provided to the students.

At the end of secondary education, the students pursuing the Class 10th have to pass an examination called the Secondary School Leaving Certificate (SSLC)or Secondary School Certificate (SSC) to move on to the next level. The SSLC is administered by the Karnataka Secondary Education Examination Board.

Ministry of Primary and Secondary Education (Karnataka)
Ministry overview
- Jurisdiction: Karnataka
- Headquarters: Bengaluru
- Minister responsible: Madhu Bangarappa, Minister of Primary and Secondary Education
- Child agencies: Karnataka Secondary Education Examination Board; Department of Pre University Education
- Website: primaryedu.karnataka.gov.in PUC : pue.karnataka.gov.in

== Higher Secondary Education ==
Students after completing their secondary education (SSLC, SSC) i.e Class 10th will further pursue their higher secondary education i.e Class 11th and Class 12th by either attending a Junior College or by continuing High School in one of three streams – Science, Commerce or Arts. Alternatively, students may also enroll in Diploma courses. Upon completing the required coursework, students enroll in general or professional degrees in universities through regular or lateral entry.

Currently, as part of the 2022 Karnataka Hijab Row, women and girls who wear hijab are banned from entering higher secondary institutions, which has brought accusations of repression of girls' education in the state.

== Baccalaureate education ==
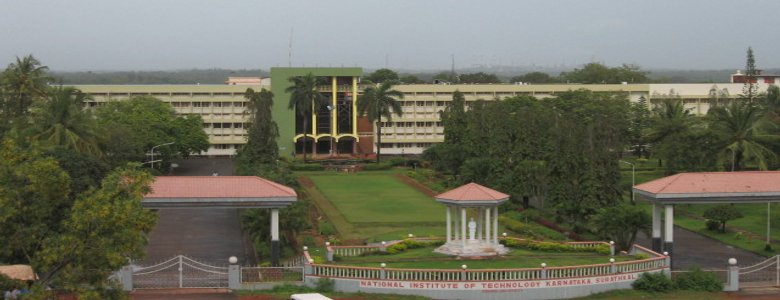
National Institute of Technology (NITK), Surathkal in Mangaluru — one of the premier engineering colleges in Karnataka

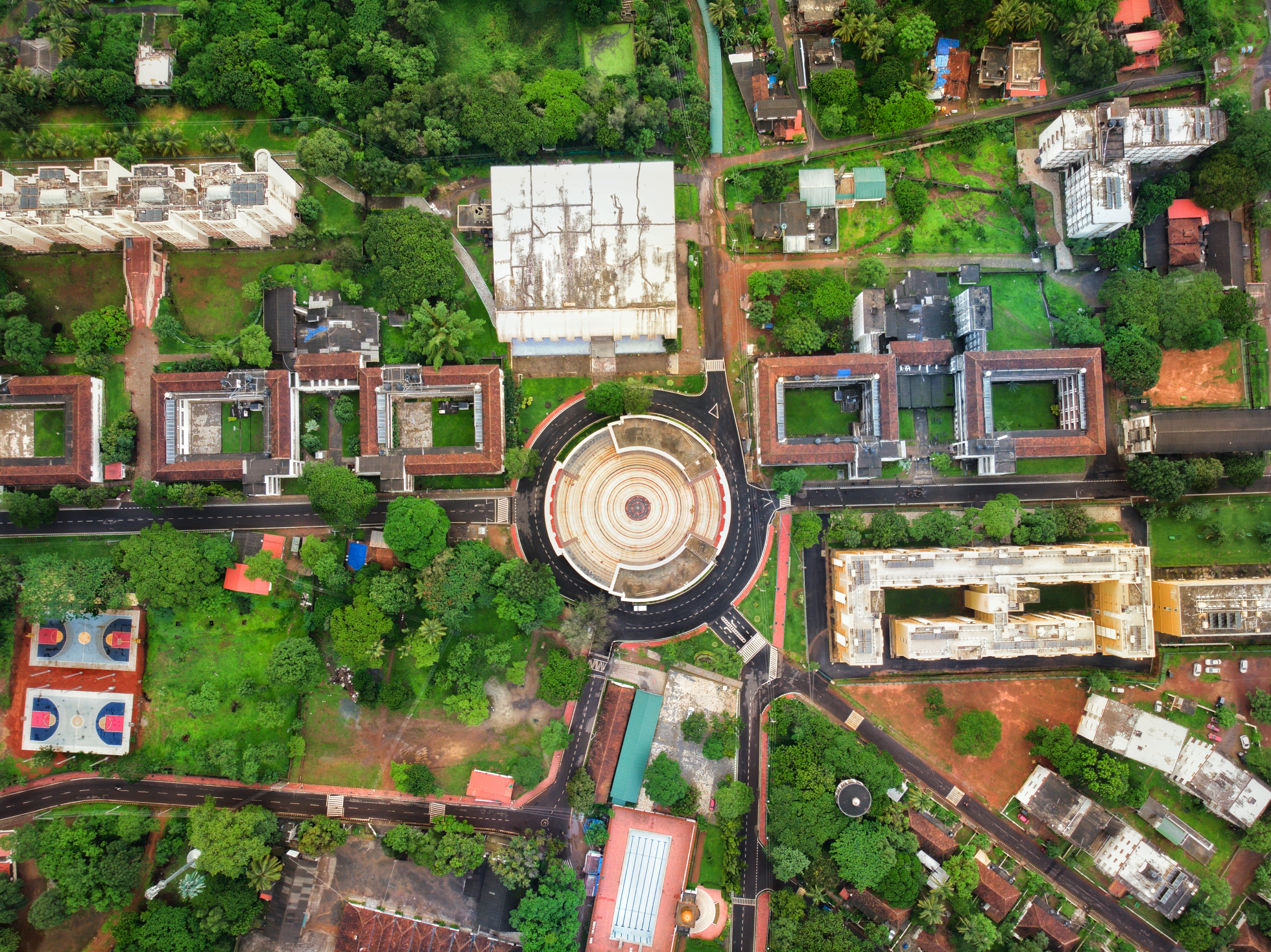
Manipal Institute of Technology, Manipal

Government of India through Central Universities Act 2009 established Central University of Karnataka at Kalburgi 2009. This university act as beacon of education and providing equal education and opportunity to rural population of kalburgi and undeveloped district of Karnataka. Here many students are come to study form different parts of country.

There are 481 degree colleges that are run under the jurisdiction of the universities in the state — Bangalore University, Kuvempu University, Mysore University, Mangalore University, Gulbarga University, and Karnatak University. Deemed universities such as Christ University, Manipal University also exist. Apart from these, there is the Visvesvaraya Technological University which oversees many of the engineering colleges in the state.

The medical colleges in the state are run under the jurisdiction of the Rajiv Gandhi University of Health Sciences. Some of these baccalaureate colleges are accredited with the status of a deemed university which grants them independence in chalking out their own syllabus and awarding degrees on their own. There are 123 engineering, 35 medical, and 40 dental colleges in the state.

The state has four universities offering courses related to agriculture:University of Agricultural Sciences, Dharwad, University of Agricultural Sciences, Bangalore, University of Agricultural Sciences, Raichur and University of Agricultural and Horticultural Sciences, Shimoga. The state has set up a Karnataka Veterinary, Animal and Fisheries Sciences University at Bidar.

Other universities established by the state government are Kannada University, Karnataka State Open University, and Karnataka State Women's University.

== Technical education ==
The first engineering college (University Visvesvaraya College of Engineering, UVCE) in Karnataka was started by the then Diwan of Mysore Sir M. Visvesvaraya in 1917 in Bengaluru. It was the fifth engineering college to be started in the country. By 1956, Karnataka had two Government and three private engineering colleges in the state.
