= List of educational institutions in Dharwad =

Dharwad is one of the most important cities in terms of education in the state of Karnataka. A large number of students from different parts of India and a few hundred students from foreign countries live and study here. Dharwad is known as the education hub of Karnataka.

== Institutes of National Importance ==
Institution	Location	Type	Founded
Indian Institute of Technology Dharwad	Dharwad	Engineering, Technology and Science	2016
Indian Institute of Information Technology	Dharwad	Information Technology	2015
National Forensic Sciences University	Dharwad	Forensic Sciences	2023

== Universities ==
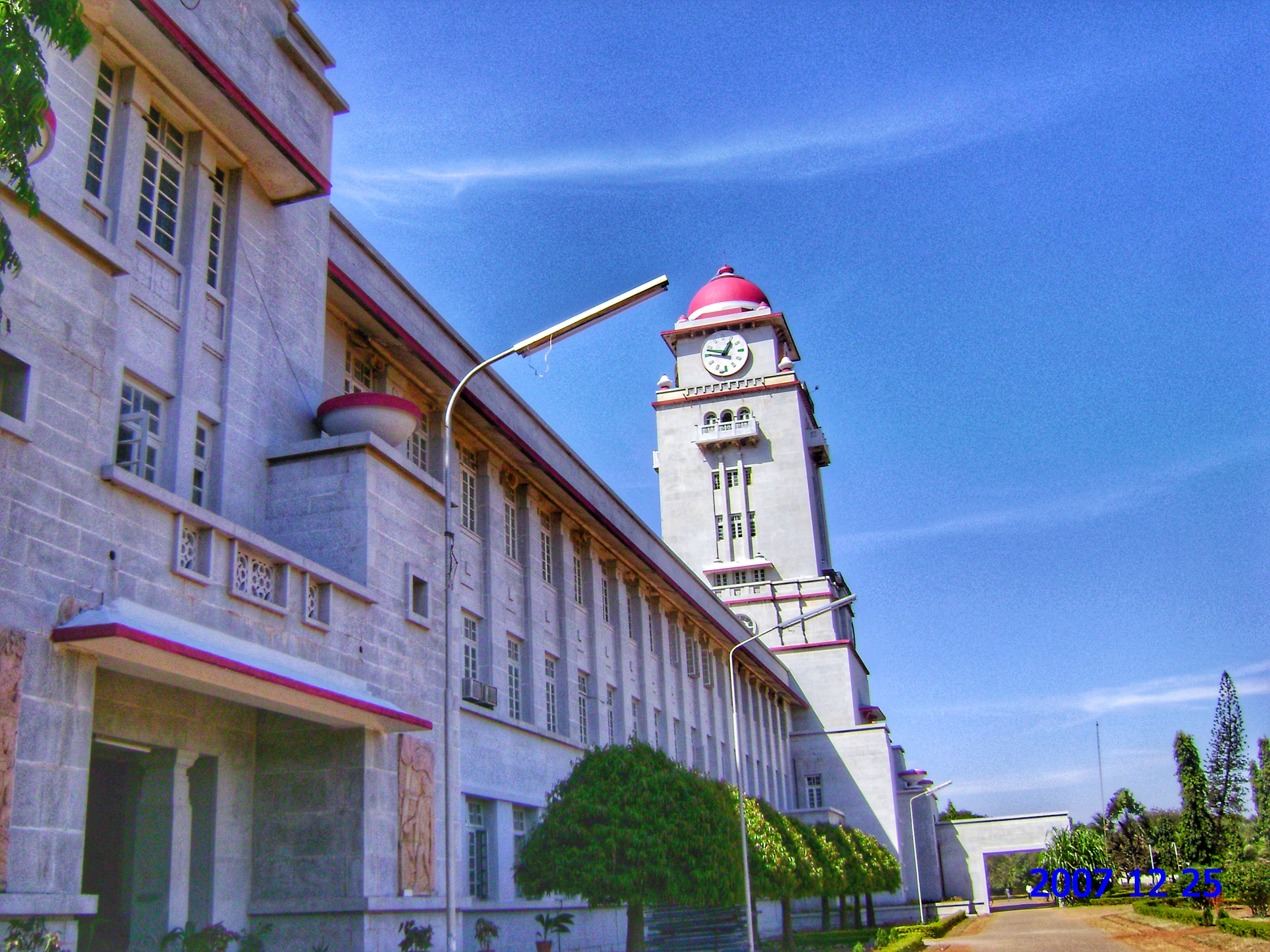
Karnatak University

- Karnatak University, Dharwad
- Karnataka State Law University (KSLU), Hubballi
- University of Agricultural Sciences, Dharwad
- Shri Dharmasthala Manjunatheshwara University, Dharwad, Dharwad
- KLE Technological University, Hubballi
- National Forensic Sciences University, Dharwad Campus

== Medical, Health Science & Physical Education Universities ==
- Karnataka Institute of Medical Sciences(KIMS), Hubballi
- KLE University's College of Pharmacy, Hubballi
- SDM College of Medical Sciences, Dharwad
- Dharwad Institute of Mental Health and Neurosciences(DIMHANS), Dharwad
- KLE JGMM Medical College, Hubballi

== Engineering, Polytechnic & Industrial Training colleges ==
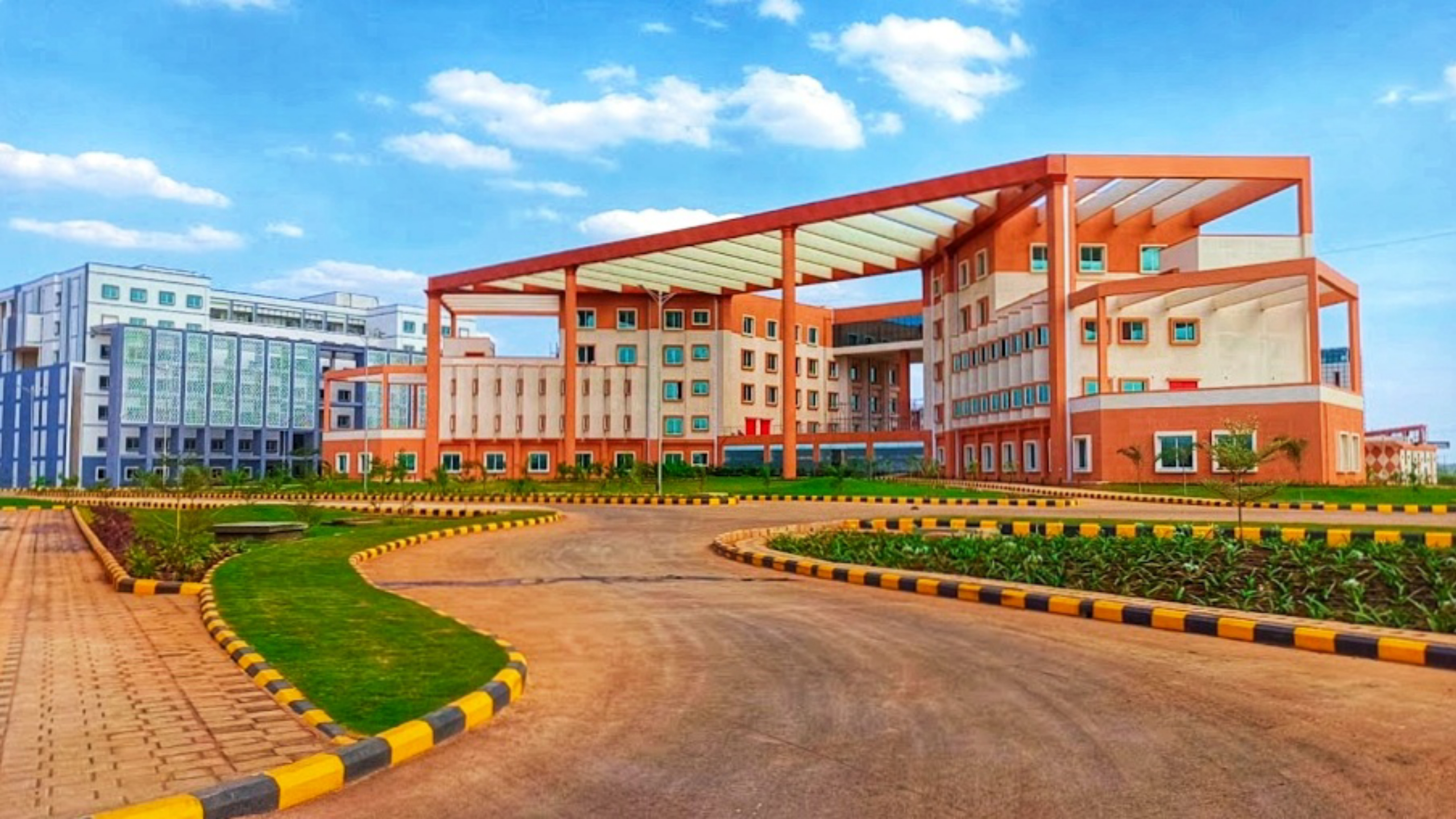
Indian Institute of Technology Dharwad

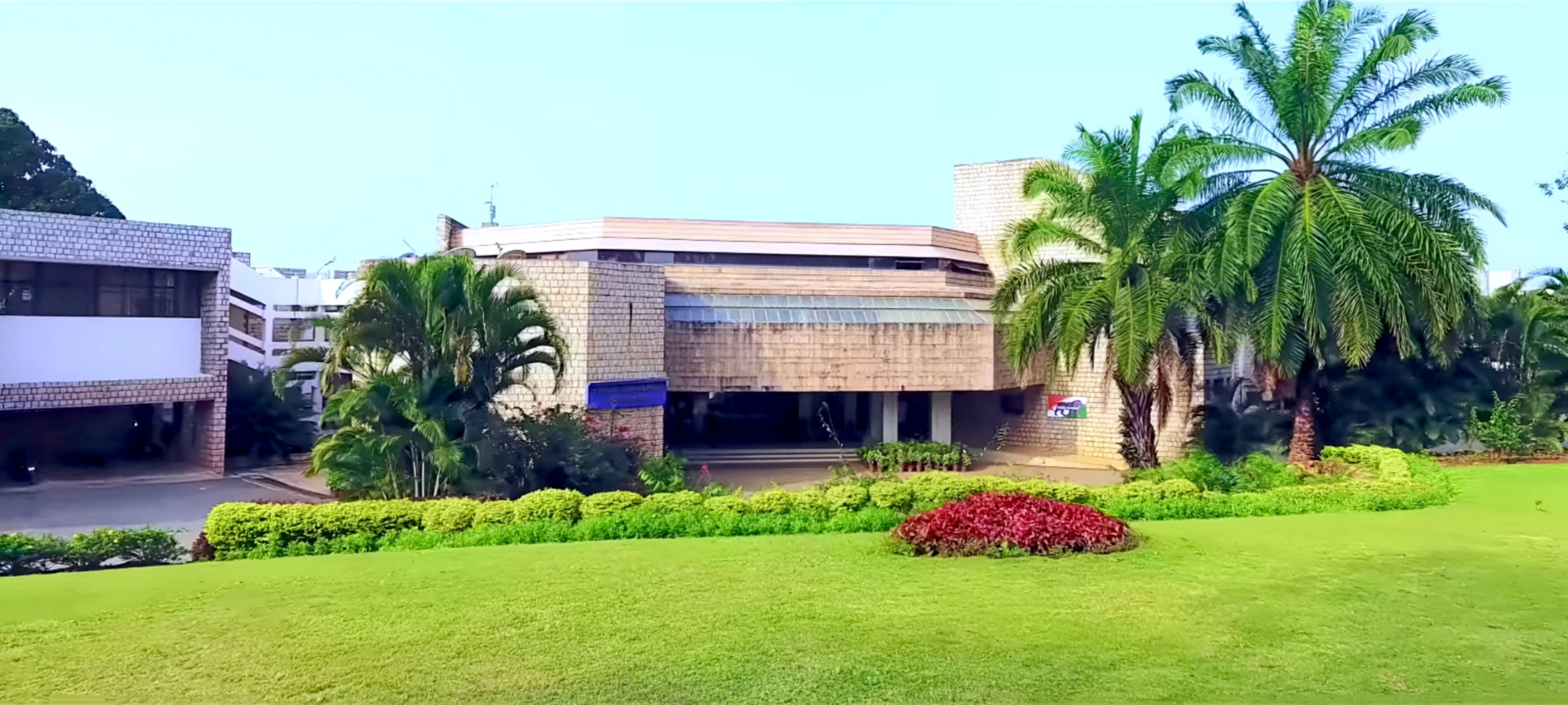
SDM College of Engineering and Technology

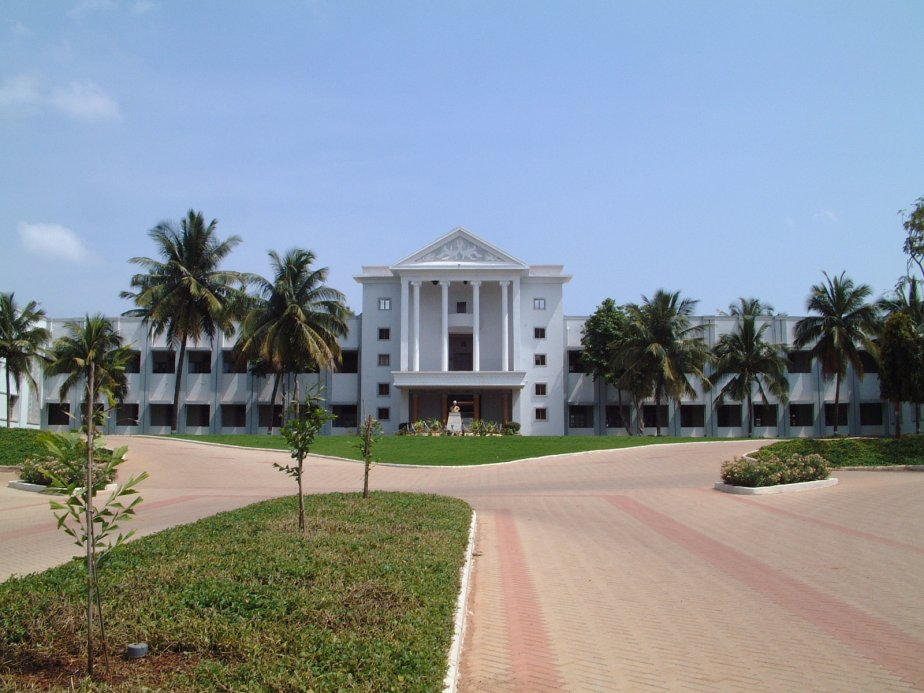
BVB College of Engineering & Technology

- BVB College of Engineering & Technology, Hubballi
- SDM College of Engineering and Technology, Dharwad
- Indian Institute of Information Technology, Dharwad (IIIT Dharwad), Dharwad
- Indian Institute of Technology Dharwad (IIT Dharwad), Dharwad
- Nettur Technical Training Foundation (NTTF), Dharwad
- Nalanda Polytechnic, Hubballi
- St. John's Polytechnic, Hubballi

== Arts, Commerce & General Science Colleges ==
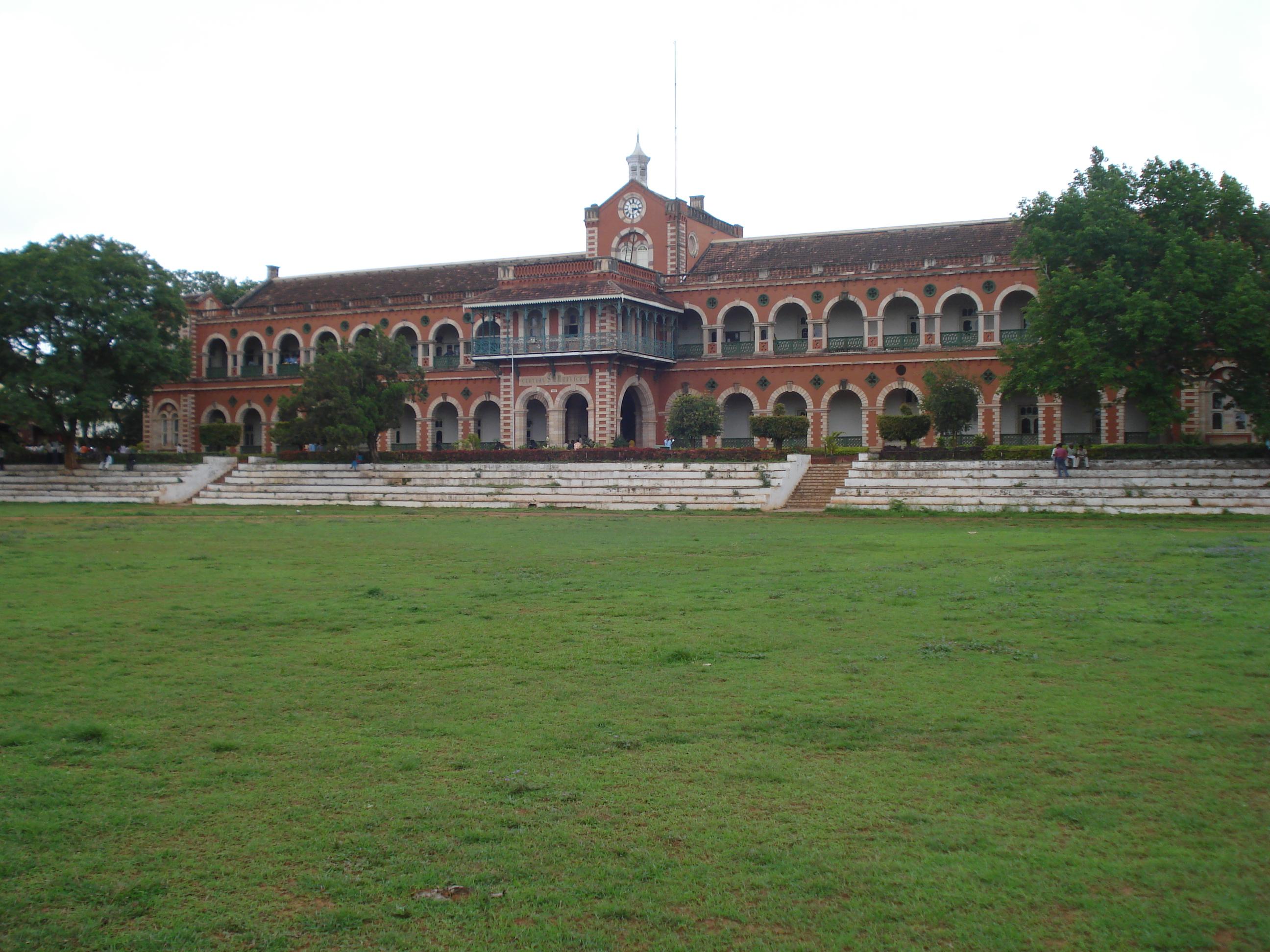
Karnatak Arts College, established 1917

- Smt. Vidya P. Hanchinmani PU Science College, Dharwad
- Empower PU Science College, Dharwad
- Karnatak College, Dharwad
- P.C. Jabin Science College, Hubballi
- Presim science PU College
- Kittle college, Jubilee Circle
- St Joseph's Science and commerce college, Jubilee Circle
- Karnataka Science College

== Post Graduate Colleges & Management Schools ==
- Kousali Institute of Management Studies
- Chetan Business School, Institute of Management & Research, Hubballi
- Sana College of Information Science & Management

== Other Colleges ==
- AGM Rural College Of Engineering & Technology
- Al-Falah College of Pharmacy
- Anjuman - e - Islam's Nehru Arts, Science and Commerce College
- Anjuman - e - Islam's Anjuman Arts College for Women, Koul Peth
- Anjuman Centenary B Ed College
- Ayurved Mahavidyalay
- Babasaheb Ambedkar 1st Grade Arts College, Navanagar
- BVVS Karnatak Christian Arts College
- Chetan Business School
- College of Pharmacy
- Dr K S Sharma College Of Computer Application
- Dr Sarojini BSW (Bachelor of Social Work) College
- Fatima BBA College, Keshwapur
- Fatima College Of Commerce, Keshwapur
- GK Education Society GK BCA College
- Global Business School
- Global College Of Computer Application
- GSB School Of Business Management & IT Campus
- Gyana Sanskar Bharati Educational Trusts BCA College
- Institute Of Excellence In Management Science, Tarihal
- Inter National Institute of Fashion Design (INIFD)
- J K College of Commerce
- Jain College
- JK Education Society BBA College
- JSS Shri Manjunatheshwara Commerce College, Heggeri
- K H Kabbur Institute of Engineering, Dharwad
- K H Patil Commerce College
- KLE College of Pharmacy
- KLE Institute Of Technology
- KLE Society's College of Education
- KLE Society's College of Pharmacy
- KLE Society's Institute of Management Studies & Research
- KLES JG College of Commerce
- KLES's College of Business Administration
- Kless Sri Kaddasiddeshwar Arts And HSK Science Institute
- KSLU's Law School
- KSS Arts And Commerce College
- KSS's B S W College
- Maharani Art & Commerce College
- MSME Development Institute
- Nitisha Lahari Society's College of Computer Applications
- Oxford College
- Oxford College of Commerce, Keshwapur
- Oxford College of Computer Applications, Keshwapur
- PC Jabin Science College
- R N Shetty College Of Hotel Management
- Rotary College Of Commerce
- S Nijalingappa Medical College
- Sana College Of Education, Shantiniketan
- Sana College Of Information Science And Management, Shantiniketan
- Sana Commerce College
- Shri Sai Physical College, Navanagar
- Sidu Vidya Sansthe Nalanda BCA College, Vidyaranya
- SJMV Women's BBA College
- SJMVS Arts And Commerce College
- SJMVS's Arts, Commerce College for Women
- SSK Arts & Commerce College
- Tippu Shaheed Institute of Technology Polytechnic
- Veman Vidyavardhaka Sangha's College of Business Administration
- Vidya Bharati Foundation IBMR BBA College
- K.B School, Sri Nagar Circle, Dharwad
