= State Highway 27 (Karnataka) =

Road in Karnataka, India

State Highway 27

Route information
- Maintained by KPWD
- Length: 395.40 km (245.69 mi)

Major junctions
- South end: Virajpet
- North end: Byndoor

Location
- Country: India
- State: Karnataka
- Primary destinations: Virajpet, Madikeri, Sakleshpura, Mudigere, Balehonnur Sringeri, Agumbe, Goliangadi, Halady, Shankarnarayana, Vandse, Halkal, Byndoor

Highway system
- Roads in India; Expressways; National; State; Asian; State Highways in Karnataka

State Highway 27, referred to as Virajpet-Byndoor Road, is a state highway that runs through the state of Karnataka. The highway traverses through five districts of Karnataka. This state highway touches numerous cities and villages Viz.Virajpet, Madikeri, Somwarpet, Gudugalale (Shanivarsante), Kodlipet, Sakleshpura, Arehalli, Mudigere, Aldur, Balehonnur, Jayapura, Sringeri, Begaru, Agumbe, Halady, Amparu, Jadkal, Yelajitha, and Byndoor. The total length of the highway is 395.40 km.
