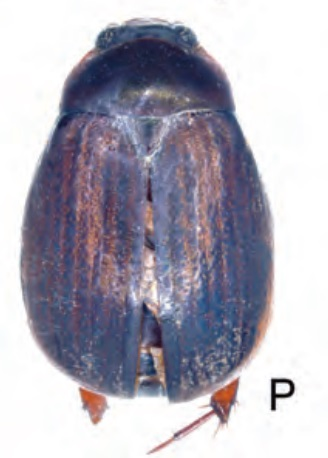

Scientific classification
- Kingdom: Animalia
- Phylum: Arthropoda
- Class: Insecta
- Order: Coleoptera
- Suborder: Polyphaga
- Infraorder: Scarabaeiformia
- Family: Scarabaeidae
- Genus: Neoserica
- Species: N. mudigereensis

Binomial name
- Neoserica mudigereensis Ahrens & Fabrizi, 2016

= Neoserica mudigereensis =

Species of beetle

Neoserica mudigereensis is a species of beetle of the family Scarabaeidae. It is found in India (Karnataka).

== Description ==
Adults reach a length of about 12–13.5 mm. They have a dark brown, almost egg-shaped body. The antennal club is yellowish brown and the dorsal surface is dull and sparsely setose.

== Etymology ==
The species is named after its type locality, Mudigere.
