= Nerukhe =

Coordinates: 16.141°N 73.801°E

Nirukhe is a village in the Konkan division of the taluk of Kudal in Sindhudurg district, Maharashtra state, India. It is surrounded by the Sahyadri mountain ranges and Pithdhaval river. There are three major ponds in the area: Helaychi Kond, Donde Kond, and Darwan Kond. The village was founded in 1981.

== Temples ==
This village has two major temples: Ravalnath Mandir and Naroba Mandir

=== Ravlnath Mandir ===
This temple was rebuilt by all the Nirukhe villagers. It is presently maintained by an institute called the Nirukhe Gramasta Sanstha. The institute's members are villagers who live in the Nirukhe Village and their brothers and sons all across world. The institute's office is in Parel, Mumbai. This village is building its base to represent young and upcoming rural India.

=== Naroba Mandir ===
This is the god, Shiva's temple which is 2 kilometers from Niruke's bus stop. This temple is also maintained by the institute, Nirukhe Gramasta Sanstha. This year, the temple will be renovated with help of donations from villagers of Nirukhe and their relatives all across the world.

== Festivals ==
There are many festivals celebrated along the coastal region of Konkan and so they are celebrated in Nirukhe. Nirukhe, although it's on the hill side and not on the coastal side, celebrates the Ganesh Chaturthi festival. Though the village lacks the amenities like proper roads and street lights, people roam around entire village to sing Bhajans during the festival. A favorite of the festival is the sweet dessert Laddu.
