= Gothos =

Village in Maharashtra

- village
- Location in Maharashtra, India Gothos (India)
- Coordinates: 16°2′18″N 73°49′36″E
- Country: India
- State: Maharashtra
- District: Sindhudurg

Languages
  - Official: Marathi
- Time zone: UTC+5:30 (IST)
- Vehicle registration: MH-

Gothos is a village at the base of Raganagad fort in Sindhudurg District of Maharashtra, India. It lies 19 kilometers (12 mi) east of the district headquarters, Kudal. The village is spread across an area of 5.2 square miles (13 km^{2}) and has 410 households. According to the 2001 Census of India, the village has a total population of 1,515 persons, of which 743 are male and 772 female. Its post code is 416519.

== History ==
The village was presented as Inam to the Rajyadhyaksha family of Kaundinya Gotra from Pilgaon in Goa, who were fleeing from the Portuguese Inquisition in the 17th century by the Raja of Sawantwadi. Hence the family was conferred the title of Gothoskar. Some families from Gothos village have taken this as their last name. The Gazetter of Ratnagiri District has a mention of the Sabnis of Gothos in the description of Manohargad and Mansantoshgad.

== Administration ==
The village comes under Kudal taluka (District headquarters). The administration is looked after by village panchayat.

== Landmarks ==
The Village has two main temples – भावई देवी Bhavai Devi (Gramdaivat) and विठोबा Vithoba temple. The Guardian Spirit of the Village is called दाडसाखळ Daadsakhal and is housed on a Banyan Tree on the main road.
