= Malahalli =

Village in Karnataka, India

Malahalli is a village located in Mudigere Talluk of Chikkamagaluru district, Karnataka, India. It is situated 15 km away from sub-district headquarter Mudigere and 26 km away from district headquarter Chikkamagaluru. As per the 2009 census, Nandipura is the gram panchayat of Malahalli village. The nearest post office to Malahalli is Buskal, Pin code - 577132.

The total geographical area of village is 151.08 hectares. Malahalli has a total population of around 120 people. There are about 25 houses in Malahalli village. Mudigere is nearest town to Malahalli which is approximately 15 km away.
