= Kelagur =

Village in Karnataka, India

Coordinates: 13.165°N 75.457°E

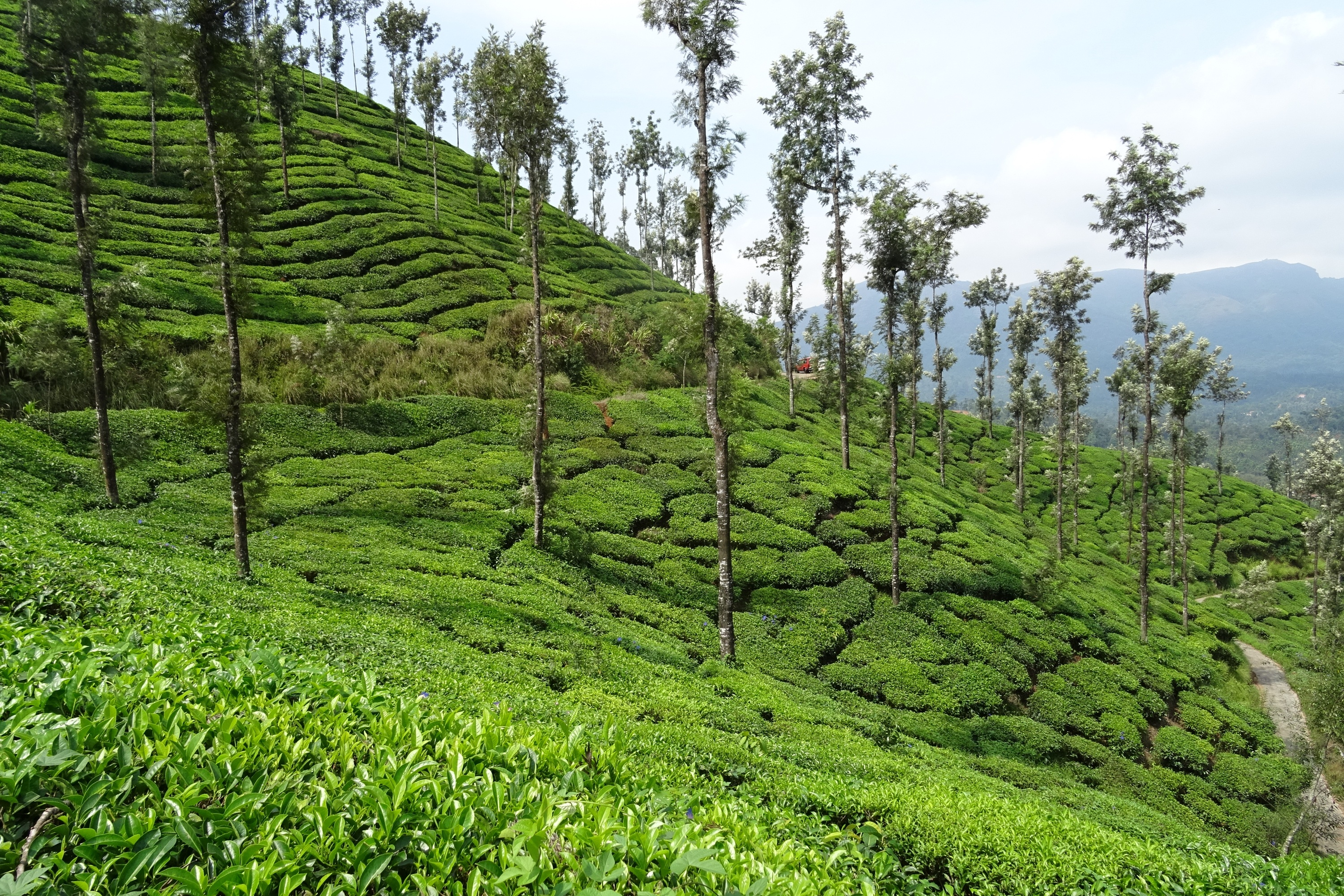
Kelagur tea estate

Kelagur is a village in Mudigere taluk, Chikkamagaluru district, Karnataka state, India. It had a population of 396 according to the 2011 census. There is a tea plantation located within the village.
