= Nafis Fathima =

Indian politician (born 1963)

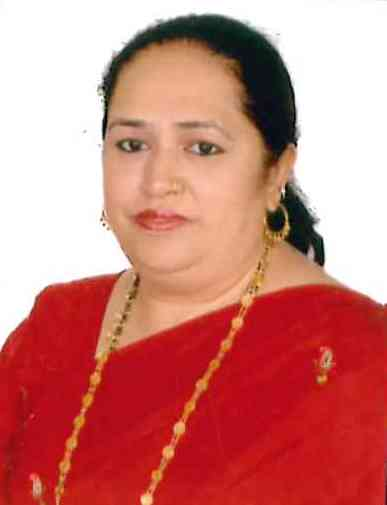
Nafis Fathima

Nafis Fathima (born 6 April 1963) was a Syndicate Member of the Bangalore University from Sept 2015 to July 2018 and Secretary of Karnataka Pradesh Congress Committee from 2009 to July 2017. She was the President of Karnataka Cancer Society for two terms, (an NGO working for the early detection and cure of Cancer by conducting various camps, talks etc. for the underprivileged) and an activist of the Indian National Congress. She had been the General Secretary of the Karnataka Pradesh Congress Committee from 1999 to 2002.

== Personal information ==
Nafis Fathima was born in Bangalore and she completed her Bachelor of Science from Nijalingappa College of Arts, Science & Commerce where she was a student leader. She later did her Master of Arts with Political Science as her subject.

She was married to Mr. Noor Ahamed Shariff on 9 January 1983 and has one son.

== Political biography ==
She had entered active politics in the year 1990, when she had contested to the elections of the Bangalore City Corporation thereafter she has been actively participating in the activities of the Indian National Congress in Karnataka beginning from the block level as the President of the Women's wing and became the state General Secretary (KPCC) under the President-ship of Mr. S.M. Krishna. She has held various positions of the party, and is now the Secretary of Karnataka Pradesh Congress Committee.

She has held various other positions like the Member of Board of Management of the University of Agricultural Sciences, Raichur and Bangalore, Karnataka and vice-president of the Karnataka State Industrial Bank Ltd., Member of Programme Committee, Doordarshan, Bangalore, Member of ZRUCC, Southern Railways, Member of Advisory Committee, All India Radio, and Member of the Family Planning Association of India.

== Positions held ==
Party positions

- President, Malleswaram West Mahila Congress Committee (I) from 1991 to 1995.
- General Secretary Malleswaram West Congress Committee (I) from 1992 to 1995.
- Joint Secretary, KPCC (I) Minority Cell from 1997 to 2002.
- General Secretary, Karnataka Pradesh Congress Committee (I).
- Member KPCC., Hebbal Block from 2002 to 2005.
- Co-opted member to the KPCC from 2005 to 2010.

Other positions

- Member, State Advisory Committee, Health & Family Welfare Department, Government of Karnataka
- Member, All India Handicrafts Board (under the Ministry of Textiles, Govt. of India).
- Member of the Board of Management of the University of Agricultural Sciences, Bangalore.
- Member of the Board of Management of the University of Agricultural Sciences, Raichur.
- Member, Family Planning Association of India, Bangalore.
- Programme Co-ordinator for INTUC., Danida Programmes, New Delhi.
- Member of Programme Committee, Doordarshan, Bangalore
- Member of ZRUCC, Southern Railways.
- Member of Advisory Committee, All India Radio, Bangalore.
- President of the Karnataka Cancer Society.
- Vice President of Karnataka State Industrial Bank Ltd.
- President of the Yelahanka Local Association of Bharath Scouts and Guides.
