= Bhandigadi =

- town
- Location in Karnataka, India
- Coordinates: 13.551680°N 75.272650°E
- Country: India
- State: Karnataka
- District: Chikkamagaluru

Languages
  - Official: Kannada
- Time zone: UTC+5:30 (IST)
- PIN: 577123
- Telephone code: 08265
- Vehicle registration: KA18
- Nearest cities: Sringeri, Koppa, Mangalore, Balehonnur, Thirtahalli
- Vidhan Sabha constituency: Koppa

Bhandigadi is a small village in Koppa taluk, Chikkamagaluru district of Karnataka, India. Located on the banks of Tunga River, there is a Sri Veeradhadreshwara Temple located in heart of the village, the village also hosts matha- Shakatapura samsthanam. Kundadri hills, located far off from the place forms a scenic background to this village.

== Geography ==
There are many hamlets surrounding the place, a few of them being: Sankainakodige, Saraluthota, Sakrebailu, Malligemane, Echalabail Haralugodige, Kaginolli, Ambalike, Guddekoppa. This Malnad village has lushy green, idyllic environment. Large proportion of the population is reliant on agriculture and other allied activities.

Arecanut, a cash crop, is the main crop grown. Other cultivated crops are paddy, Banana, cardamom, Pepper, rubber, vanilla, coconut. The families with more agricultural land are the prominent ones and they are the ones who enjoy both economical and political power. However, no caste discrimination or economic exploitation of severe degree is observed in the village. Vokkaliga community has the highest population followed by Brahmins and lingayath Community. The village also has sizeable Muslim community. The village has great communal harmony. People of all faiths gather together in celebrations of village fair and other festivals. Furthermore, all caste groups and communities are interdependent on each other.

== Education ==
Education standards of people of the village are good. There are two government schools that provide education for hundreds of students every year. Students are venturing out to far off cities to avail education. Large number of people, especially youths have migrated to cities, mostly to Bengaluru - the state capital, for the immense educational and employment opportunities it provides.

== Facilities ==
Basic amenities like drinking water, roads etc are of good standards. Apart from two government schools, the village has a public library. A Primary Health care center is also well equipped and provides basic health care facilities to the people from the village and other surrounding villages. A veterinary hospital, post office, rice mill and even a branch of Cauvery Kalpataru Grameena Bank, a RRB affiliated to SBI, operates in the village. A liquor shop run by State Government backed MSIL operates in the village.

The village has a well functioning Gram Panchayat with Grama Sabhas being regularly held. Electoral divisions here is not along the caste lines like in many other villages in the state.
