= College of Horticulture Mudigere =

College in Mudigere, Karnataka, India

College of Horticulture, Mudigere ತೋಟಗಾರಿಕಾ ಮಹಾವಿದ್ಯಾಲಯ ಮೂಡಿಗೆರೆ
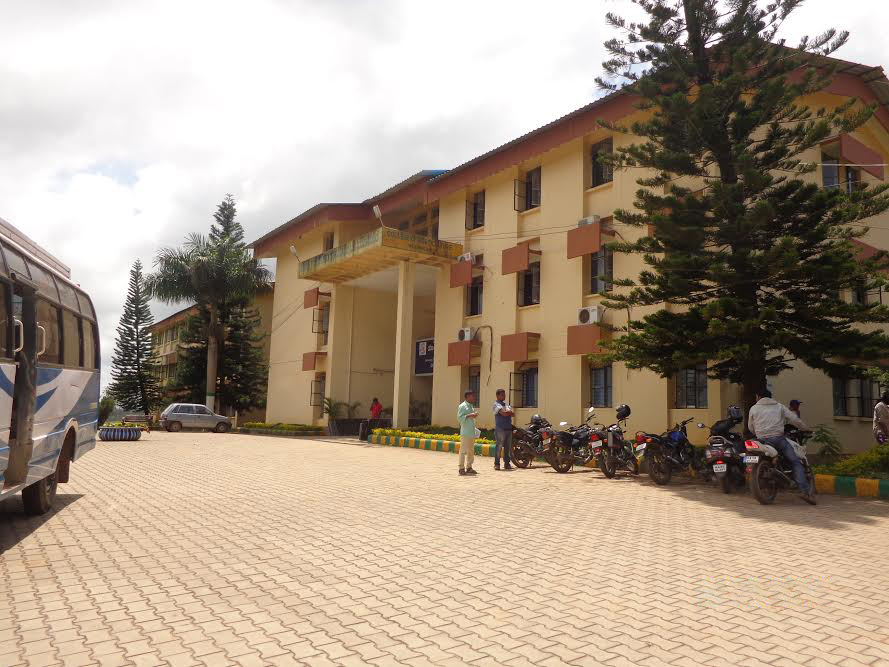
- Administrative building
- Other names: COH, Mudigere
- Motto: To be a premier College of Horticulture by developing quality manpower
- Type: Public
- Established: 1971; 55 years ago 1991; 35 years ago (shifted to Mudigere)
- Affiliations: Indian Council of Agricultural Research
- Academic affiliations: Keladi Shivappa Nayaka University of Agricultural and Horticultural Sciences
- Dean: Dr. N. S. Mavarkar
- Location: Mudigere, Chikkamagaluru, Karnataka, 577132, India; 13.115232°N 75.630830°E
- Campus: 441.2 acres (1.785 km^{2}) which includes RRS.
- Website: www.cohmudigere.edu.in
- Location in Karnataka, India

College of Horticulture Mudigere is a horticulture college located in Mudigere, Karnataka, India. Established in 1991, it is affiliated to the University of Agricultural and Horticultural Sciences, Shivamogga and was previously affiliated to the University of Horticultural Sciences, Bagalkot. This horticultural education center is the oldest in Karnataka. The college has been accredited by the Indian Council of Agricultural Research since 25 August 2004.

== History ==
University of Agricultural Sciences, Bangalore started a degree program in horticulture at Bengaluru, first of its kind in India established during 1970. Later during 1991–1992 it was shifted to Mudigere, Chikkamagaluru District, by establishing a College of Horticulture Mudigere. The college has been offering an undergraduate program since its inception and M.Sc. (Hort.) program since 2010–11.

== Location ==
The college is located in Western Ghats about 4 km southwest of Mudigere (13,7,N 74,37,E 970m above Mean Sea Level) beside the Mudigere-Hassan main road. It is located in an average elevation of 970 m (3,180 ft). The annual rainfall is typically very high ranging from 3000 mm to 3500 mm.

== Infrastructure ==
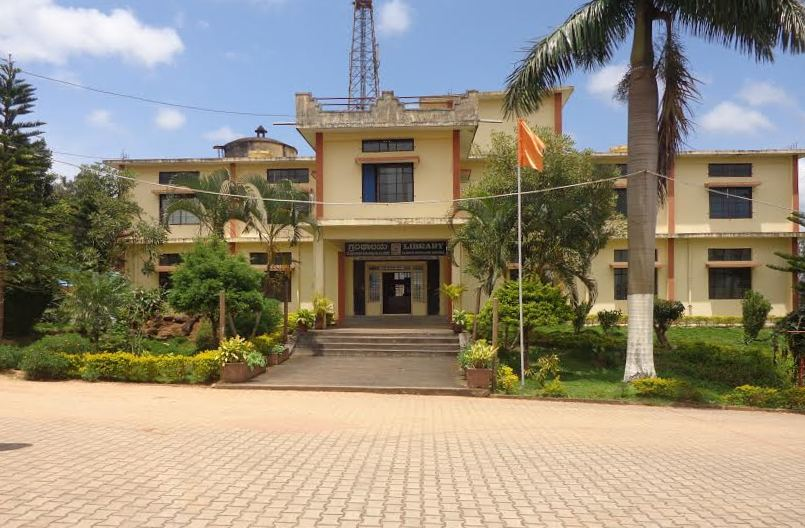
Main library of the college of horticulture mudigere

The college is well equipped with spacious class rooms, various laboratories, audio visual teaching aids, crop museum, glass houses, poly houses, plant conservatory and sufficient land for field experiments. The teaching process is supported by library and computer center with ARIS network. For students accommodation at the campus, separate mess and hostels for boys and girls are available with Wi-Fi. For the accommodation of the guests, visiting professors and scientists guest houses are built within the campus. Outdoor as well as indoor sport stadiums encourages sports activity among students.

Crop museums on different horticultural crops within the campus includes plantation and spice crops, fruit crops, vegetable crops; floriculture and landscape gardening. It provides an added advantage and good opportunities for the students for practical learning.

The college also has a zonal agricultural research station within the campus which helps for practical teaching purpose on various horticultural crops and to involve in on going research works.

Extension Education Unit and Krishi Vignyana Kendra on the campus conducts various on campus and off campus training programmes, transfer of technologies, demonstrations, crop seminars on various horticulture and agricultural crops for the benefit of the farmers of the surrounding region.

== Academic profile ==
=== Boards and Courses ===
==== Undergraduate Courses ====
COH Mudigere offers Bachelor of Science (B.Sc.) 4 year degree in horticulture which covers the following disciplines:

- Floriculture & landscape architecture
- Fruit science (pomology)
- Plantation, spices, medicinal and aromatic crops
- Horticulture entomology
- Vegetable science (Olericulture)
- Crop improvement and biotechnology
- Post harvest technology
- Natural resource management

==== Postgraduate Courses ====
The college offers 2 years degree of Master of Science (M.Sc.) in the following subjects.

- Floriculture and landscape architecture
- Fruit science (pomology)
- Plantation, spices, medicinal and aromatic crops
- Horticulture entomology
- Genetics and Plant Breeding
- Vegetable science (olericulture)

== Research ==
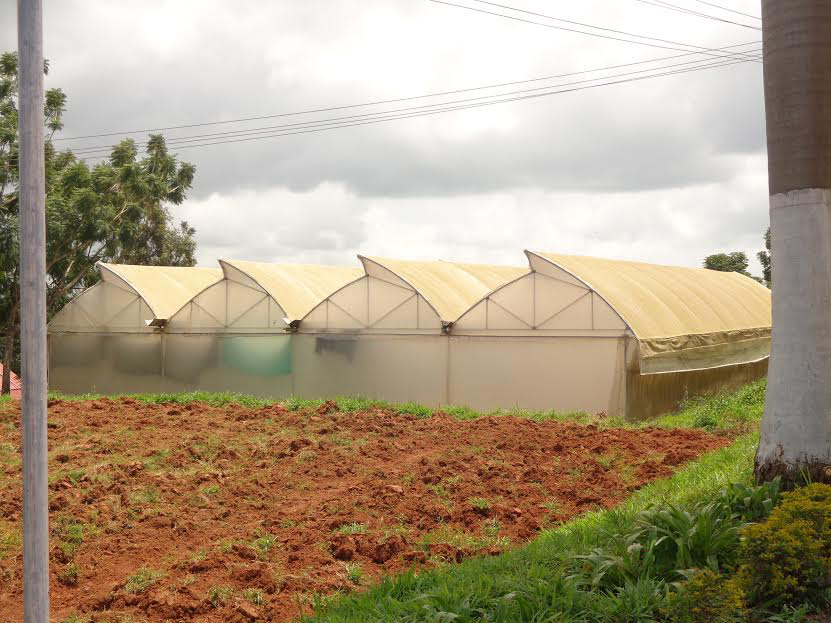
Naturally ventilated climate controlled poly house in College of horticulture mudigere

Research work done by the college of horticulture & Zonal Agricultural and Horticultural Research Station, Mudigere

=== Caramom, Cashew, Spices and Horticultural Crops ===
==== Crop Improvement-New Varieties ====
Name of the Varieties	Released date	Yield	Advantages
Mudigere-1	1984	250-300 kg/hectare	
Mudigere-2	1994	475 kg/hectare	
P 6			Drought tolerant clone
CL-730 and CL-692	2001-02	1.57 and 1.53 kg/hectare respectively	
CL-D-237		1.80 kg/hectare	

=== Paddy ===
==== Crop Improvement-New Varieties ====
Name of the Varieties	Released date	Advantages
INTAN	1974	A high yielding variety suitable for low land situations but susceptible to blast disease.
IET-7191	1987	This variety is tolerant to Blast disease
KHP-2 (IR-10781)	1990	suitable for midlands of hill zone also tolerant to Blast disease
CTH-1 (MUKTHI)	1992	suitable for upland conditions, early duration rice varieties for late planting also tolerant to blast disease.
Hemavathi (DWR-4107)	1994	for low lands of hill zone, high yielding, long duration blast
KHRS-26 (KHP-5)	1998	upland for direct sowing situations of hill zone
Sharavathi (IR-57773)	2001	upland for direct sowing situations of hill zone, non-lodging, blast and temporary submergence tolerant
IET 13901	2000	A medium duration, semi tall, blast tolerant rice variety
