= Phrynoderma konkani =

Scientific classification
- Kingdom: Animalia
- Phylum: Chordata
- Class: Amphibia
- Order: Anura
- Family: Dicroglossidae
- Genus: Phrynoderma
- Species: P. konkani

Binomial name
- Phrynoderma konkani Yadav, Bhosale, Koli, Gopalan, Kadam, Khandekar, and Dinesh, 2024

Species of frog

Phrynoderma konkani, commonly known as the Konkan pond frog, is a species of pond frog in the family Dicroglossidae. It was formally described as a new species by Omkar Yadav and colleagues in 2024 from the coastal plains of Maharashtra, western India.The specific name konkani refers to the Konkan coastal region where the species occurs.

== Discovery ==
Phrynoderma konkani was discovered in the coastal region of Maharashtra, western India, and formally described as a new species in 2024. The discovery was reported by Yadav and colleagues in the Journal of Asia-Pacific Biodiversity. The specimens were collected from Thakurwadi Lake in Kudal, Sindhudurg district, Maharashtra. The researchers identified the species using morphological characteristics and molecular evidence, distinguishing it from related pond frogs.

== Description ==
Phrynoderma konkani is a species of pond frog belonging to the family Dicroglossidae. It was described from the coastal plains of Maharashtra, western India. The species is distinguished from other members of its genus by a combination of morphological characteristics and molecular evidence.

Adult males are smaller than females. The reported snout–vent length ranges from 34.7 to 35.8 mm in males and 50.6 to 55.5 mm in females. The frog has an acutely pointed snout, a distinct tympanum and paired lateral vocal sacs in males. Its first finger is longer than the second, which is one of the morphological characteristics used in its identification. The species also possesses distinctive features of its skin, body proportions and dorsal colour pattern. These characteristics are important for distinguishing it from closely related pond frogs. The researchers compared its morphology with that of other members of the genus Phrynoderma to establish its taxonomic identity. Molecular analyses provided additional evidence for its recognition as a distinct species. The study used mitochondrial 16S ribosomal RNA (16S rRNA) and nuclear tyrosinase gene sequences to examine its relationships with related frogs. The combination of morphological observations and molecular evidence supported its description as a new species in 2024.
