= Mandakuli =

Village in Maharashtra, India

Mandakuli Mandakuli
- Village
- Location in Maharashtra, India Mandakuli (India)
- Coordinates: 16.008°N 73.687°E
- Country: India
- State: Maharashtra
- District: Sindhudurg

Government
  - Type: Gram panchayat
- Elevation: 18 m (59 ft)

Population (2011)
  - Total: 25,000

Languages
  - Official: Marathi, Malvani/Kudali
- Time zone: UTC+5:30 (IST)
- Postal code: 416520
- Vehicle registration: MH-07

Mandakuli is a small village in Kudal in Sindhudurg district, Maharashtra, India. It is situated on Karli River in southwest Maharashtara. Mandakuli comes in Kudal taluka.

== Geography ==
Mandakuli is located at 16.008°N 73.687°E. It has an average elevation of 20 metres (65 feet). The climate is mostly coastal And humid. annual temperature rises from 22 to 40 degree Celsius. Mandakuli gets very heavy rainfall of 1100mm per year.

== Temples in Mandakuli ==
Lingeshwar Temple – This temple is of Lord Shiva.

Pawanaai Temple -

Maruti Temple -
