= Nalanda Polytechnic =

Coordinates: 15°21′53.29″N 75°14′12.5″E

Nalanda Foundations Polytechnic
- Motto: Quality technical education with government specified fees
- Type: Education and Private institution
- Established: 1992
- Principal: S H Nabhapur
- Location: Hubli, Karnataka, India
- Nickname: NALANDians
- Website: http://nfptech.in

Nalanda Foundation Polytechnic in Hubli, Karnataka was founded in 1992. It started in a temporary building in Hubli and moved to a permanent building on Gadag Road in 2004. It offers four Diploma Engineering courses. It is affiliated to the Department of Technical Education Bangalore, and is recognised by the Government of Karnataka. Nalanda Foundation Polytechnic has been approved by the All India Council for Technical Education New Delhi. It operates under the aegis of 'Sidhu Vidya Samasthe', a charitable nonprofit educational trust.

== History ==
Nalanda Foundations Polytechnic was founded in 1992 by G.R. Sandra in Hubli Karnataka. It was taken over by Sidhu Vidya Samasthe headed by H. S. Nabhapur in 1998. It was initially housed in a temporary building in Udaynagar, Nagashettykoppa with two branches and three students. It was relocated to Vidyaranya in 2004. The polytechnic offers 4 Diploma Engineering courses and enrolls more than 200 students.

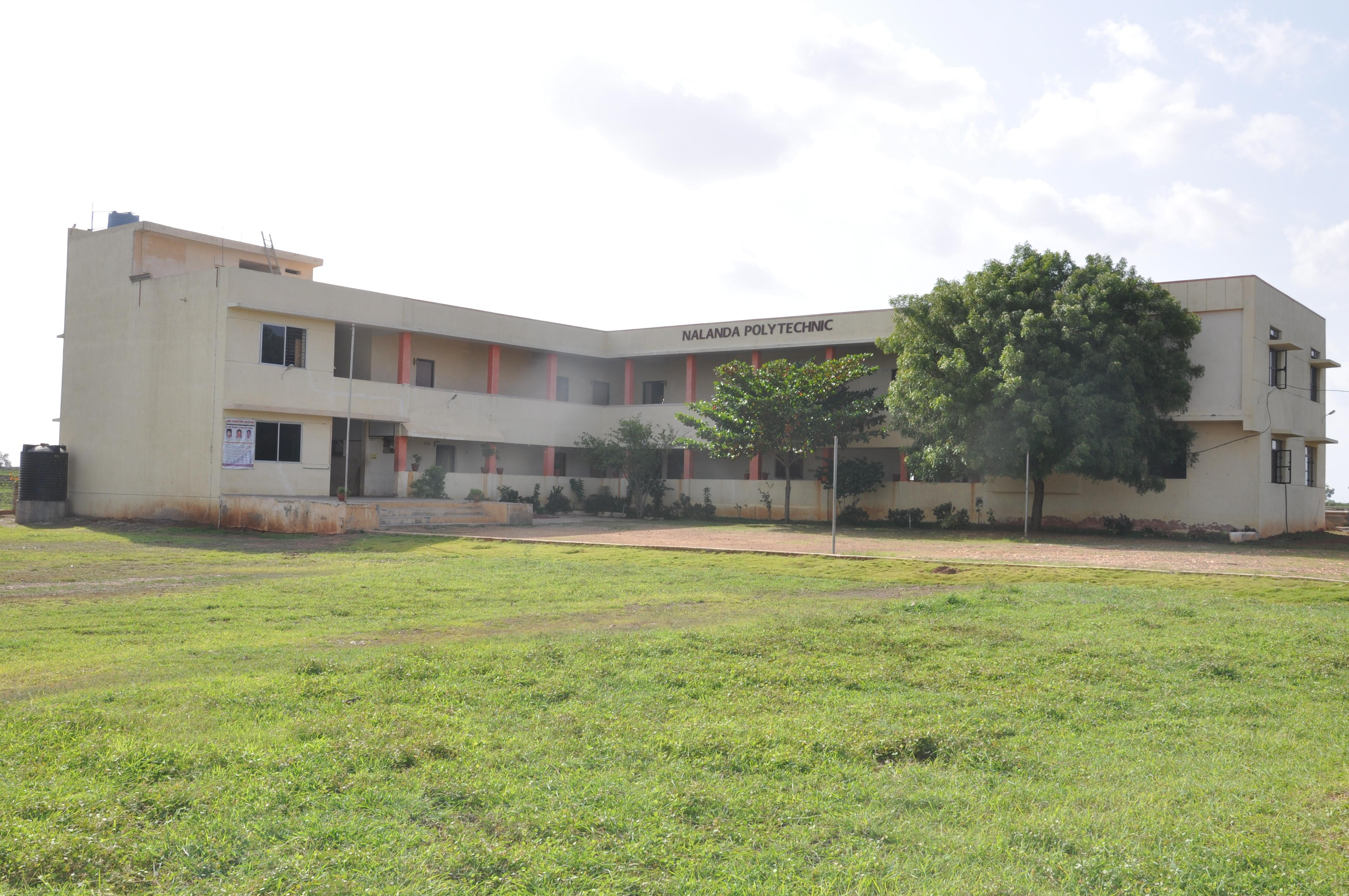
The college

== Campus ==
Spread across six acres, the Campus contains multiple buildings. Its amenities include class rooms, laboratories and a playground.

== Educational programs ==
SL NO	Department	Started in	Intake
01	Electronics and Communication Engineering	1992	30
02	Computer Science and Engineering	1993	30
04	Civil Engineering	2011	30

== Student portal ==
In the campus there are many environmental related activities held and students can participate in the activities of their own interest. The college offers four courses for the students to choose through the admission process.

Courses Available @ College

1) Diploma in Computer Science Engineering

2) Diploma in Electronics & Communication Engineering

3) Diploma in Civil Engineering

4) Diploma in Instrumental Communication

A maximum of 45 Students can admitted for each course.

== Industries linkages ==
The polytechnic's placement cell is tied with following organizations.

- Ever Electronics Pvt. Ltd., Pune
- ekLakshya Semiconductors, Hubli
- Shanthala Power Limited, Hubli
- Online Instruments (India) Private Limited, Bangalore

== See also ==
- List of educational institutions in Dharwad
