= IIT Dharwad =

Public engineering institution in Karnataka, India

Indian Institute of Technology Dharwad
- Motto: Sā vidyā yā vimuktaye (Sanskrit)
- Motto in English: Knowledge is one that liberates
- Type: Public technical university
- Established: 2016 (10 years ago)
- Chairman: Sridhar Vembu
- Director: Venkappayya R. Desai
- Academic staff: 86
- Students: 866
- Undergraduates: 701
- Postgraduates: 59
- Doctoral students: 106
- Location: Indian Institute of Technology, Dharwad, Karnataka, 580011, India; 15.48735°N 74.93453°E
- Campus: Main campus – 470 acres Temporary – Water and Land Management Institute (WALMI)
- Acronym: IIT-Dharwad
- Colours: Purple Marigold
- Website: iitdh.ac.in

The Indian Institute of Technology Dharwad (IIT-Dharwad or IIT-DH) is an autonomous engineering and technology institute in Dharwad, Karnataka, India. IIT Dharwad started functioning from July 2016 in a temporary campus, previously of the Water and Land Management Institute (WALMI) in Belur Industrial Area, on the outskirts of Dharwad city. It was formally inaugurated on 28 August 2016. IIT Dharwad's permanent campus is situated at Chikkamalligawad, Dharwad, Karnataka. The campus has been fully operational since March 2023, when it was inaugurated and dedicated to the nation by Prime Minister Narendra Modi. For the academic year 2016–2017, the institute offered B.Tech courses in three branches, namely. Electrical Engineering, Computer Science, and Mechanical Engineering. The year 2021 saw the introduction of an additional branch, Engineering physics. As of 2022, the institute expanded to provide four additional courses of study, namely Chemical and Biochemical engineering, Mathematics and Computing, Civil and Infrastructure engineering, and Interdisciplinary Sciences.

As part of the mentorship plan, IIT Bombay is the mentor institute for IIT Dharwad. The MoE has set up an IIT monitoring cell at IIT Bombay. The committee members were designated as officials on special duty to supervise the process of setting up IIT Dharwad.

== History ==
The late Union Human Resources Development Minister S. R. Bommai had moved the proposal to the Centre seeking an IIT in Dharwad in the 1990s. In 1998, a committee headed by former ISRO chairman and space scientist Udupi Ramachandra Rao submitted its report recommending an IIT in Hubballi-Dharwad. Union finance Minister Arun Jaitley in the 2015-16 union budget, sanctioned a budget for IIT for Karnataka state and the state government suggested three locations. The short-listed cities were Dharwad, Mysuru, and Raichur.

== Campus ==
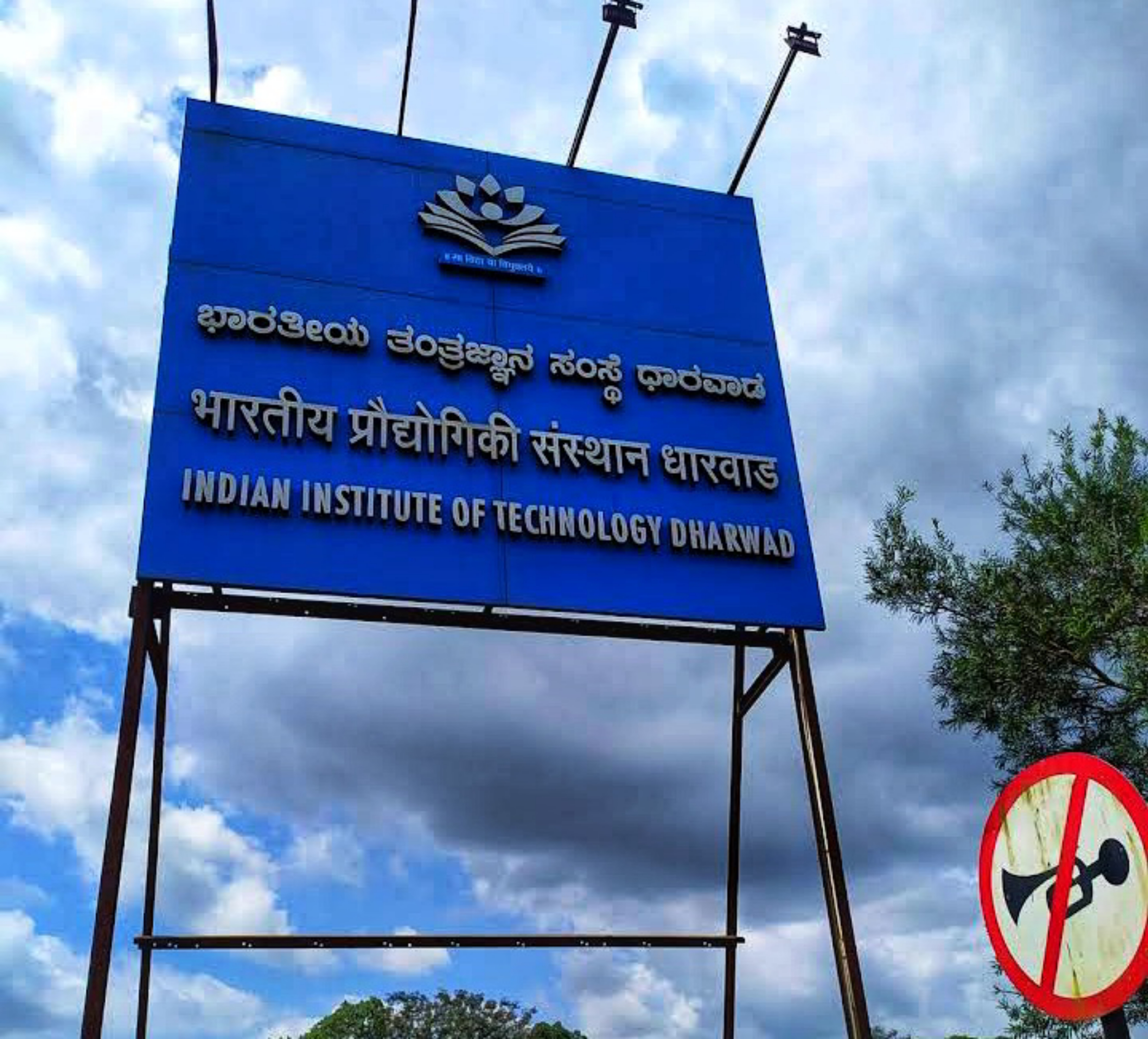
IIT Dharwad signage

IIT Dharwad initially functioned out of the campus of the Water and Land Management Institute (WALMI) in Dharwad near the Karnataka High Court Bench. A permanent campus was set up at Chikkamaligawad village.

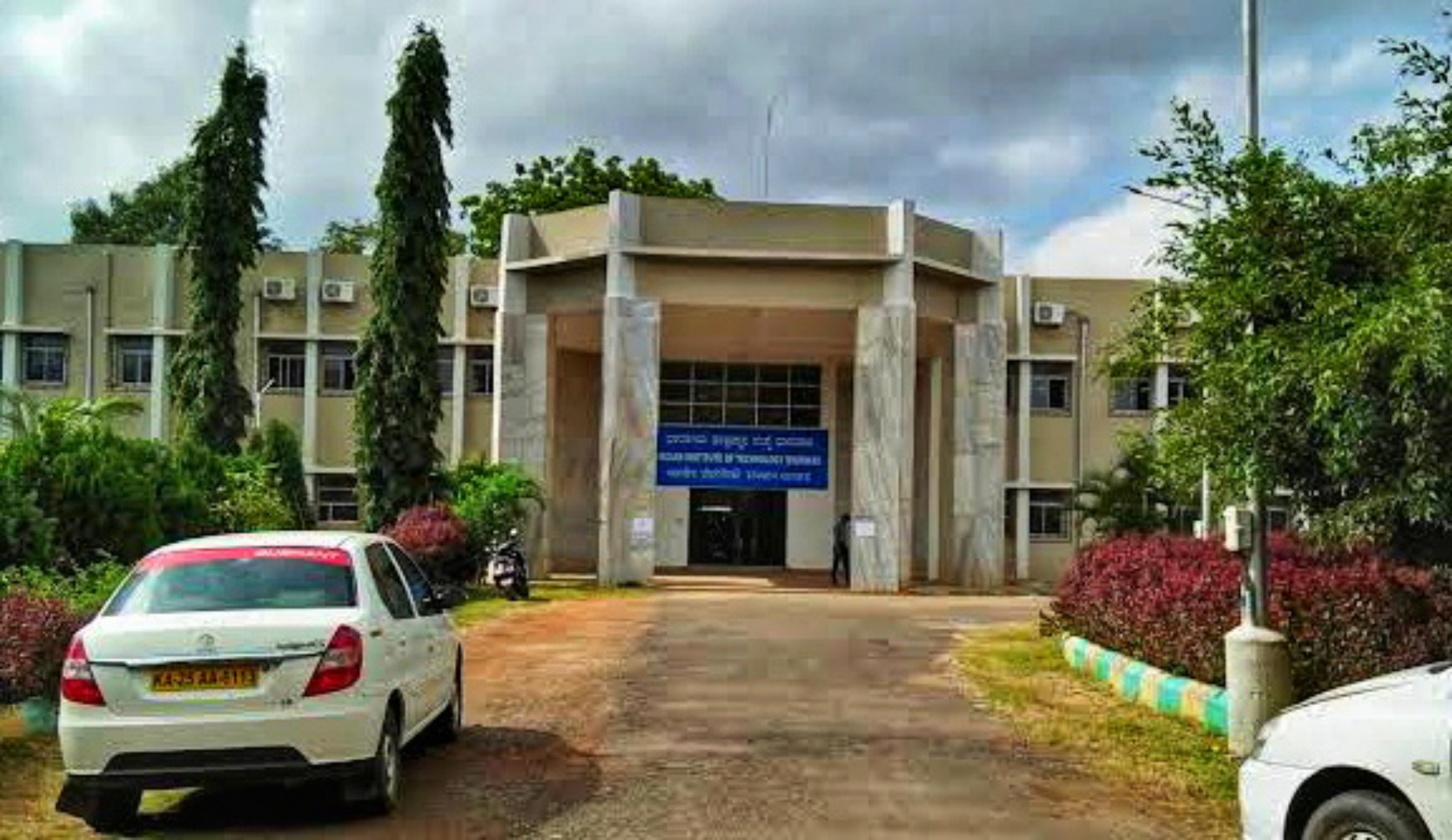
IIT Dharwad (2016–2023)

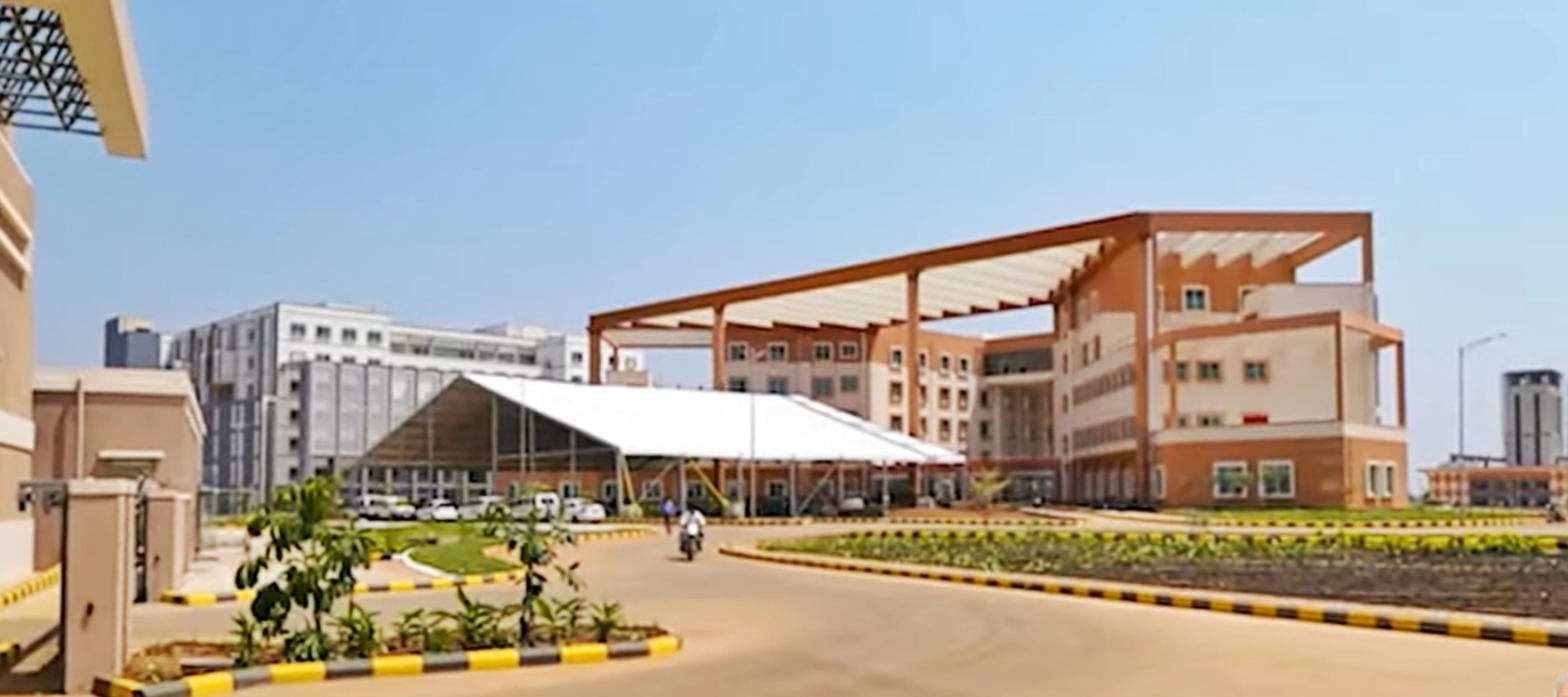
IIT Dharwad permanent campus inaugurated in March 2023

Around 500 acres belonging to KIADB near Mummigatti on the Pune-Bangalore National Highway off Dharwad was identified for the IIT campus, but that deal was cancelled due to legal hurdles.

The permanent campus, at Chikkamalligawad, of the IIT Dharwad was inaugurated on 12 March 2023 by the Prime Minister Narendra Modi. It was the first green and smart IIT in India.

Dharwad city also houses other educational institutions like:

- Karnatak University,
- Karnatak College,
- University of Agricultural Sciences,
- Shree Dharmasthala Manjunatheshwara College of Engineering and Technology (SDMCET),
- IIIT Dharwad,
- Nettur Technical Training Foundation (NTTF)'s Tool and Die Making Educational Institute, Dharwad.

There is an airport at Gokul Road, Hubballi, the twin city of Dharwad. The airport has air services connecting to:

- Ahmedabad,
- Bengaluru,
- Chennai,
- Hindon-Delhi,
- Goa,
- Hyderabad,
- Kannur,
- Kochi,
- Mumbai and
- Tirupati.

There is a railway station at Dharwad through which trains from Bengaluru to Goa run. Hubballi Junction is the major railway junction which has train connections to:

- Kochuveli,
- Bengaluru,
- Mumbai,
- Hyderabad,
- Varanasi,
- Howrah,
- Chennai,
- Hazrat Nizamuddin,
- Kolhapur,
- Solapur,
- Vijayawada and
- Vasco

among others. Also, Hubballi city is the headquarters of the South Western Railway Zone of the Indian Railways.

== Organisation and administration ==
=== Departments, centers, and schools ===
Nearly 60 seats each in the streams of BTech in:

- Computer Science,
- Electrical and
- Mechanical engineering

are available at the institute. Classes began on 15 July 2016, along with the other IITs across the country.

- A new B.Tech programme in Engineering Physics with ~15 seats has been started in the Autumn 2021 Semester.
- As of 2022, the institute expanded to provide four additional courses of study, namely:
  - Chemical and Biochemical engineering,
  - Mathematics and Computing,
  - Civil and Infrastructure engineering and
  - Interdisciplinary Sciences.

The student intake as of 2022 has increased to 310 including supernumerary.

In January 2022, IIT Dharwad established the Global Center of Excellence in Affordable and Clean Energy (GCoE-ACE) in partnership with Honeywell Hometown Solutions India Foundation (HHSIF), the philanthropic arm of Honeywell.

== Academics ==
=== Programmes ===
The institute conducts educational programs leading to the degrees of:

- Bachelor of Technology (B. Tech.),
- Bachelor of Science - Master of Science (BS-MS) five year programme,
- Master of Technology (M. Tech.),
- Master of Science (MS) and
- Ph.D.

Degree	Specialization
Bachelor of Technology (BTech)	Computer Science and Engineering, Electronics and Communication Engineering, Electrical and Electronics Engineering, Mechanical Engineering, Engineering Physics, Chemical and Biochemical engineering, Mathematics and Computing,and Civil and Infrastructure engineering
Bachelor of Science - Master of Science (BS-MS)	Biology, Chemistry, Physics and Mathematics
Master of Science (MS)	Computer Science and Engineering, Electrical Engineering, Mechanical Engineering
Ph.D.	Bio Sciences and Bio Engineering, Chemistry, Computer Science and Engineering, Electrical Engineering, Humanities and Social Sciences, Mathematics, Mechanical Engineering, Physics
Master of Technology (MTech)	Mechanical Engineering, Electrical Engineering

Since the year 2024, the BTech Specialization in Electrical Engineering was discontinued, and was replaced by BTech in Electronics and Communication Engineering, and BTech in Electrical and Electronics Engineering.

=== Ranking ===
University rankings

Engineering – India
- NIRF (2023): 93

IIT Dharwad is ranked 77 among the engineering colleges of India by National Institutional Ranking Framework (NIRF) in 2025.

== Student life ==
=== Cultural and non-academic activities ===
The activities are divided into three verticals namely: technical, cultural and sports.

==== Technical Council ====
- Hardly Human - AI club
- Astral - Astronomy club
- Code Geass - Coding club
- Abhikalpa - Design club
- Electronics club
- Finance club - Insolvent
- Ingene - Motorsports club
- Robotics club
- Cosmosoc - Space and Data Science club

==== Cultural Council ====
- Sapphire - Dance Club
- Dramatics Club
- Aesthetica - Fine Arts Club
- Eunoia - Literary Club
- Rhapsody - Music Club
- Focus - Photography Club
- Quiz Club
- Prabodhini - Spiritual Club

==== Sports Council ====
- Athletics club
- Badminton club
- Basketball club
- Chess club
- Cricket club
- E-Sports club
- Football club
- Hockey club
- Squash club
- Table Tennis club
- Volleyball club
- Weightlifting club

IIT Dharwad also organises its own intra-IIT cultural(HarSHtAl), technical(PARSEC) and sports meets, which are conducted annually. These often garner participants from various branches and batches, and even other colleges.

== Awards ==
- S R Mahadeva Prasanna, a Senior Member of the IEEE, and Professor in the Department of Electrical Engineering at the Indian Institute of Technology Dharwad was awarded the President of India National Award for Teachers (2023).

== See also ==
- Indian Institutes of Technology
- Indian Institute of Technology Bombay
- List of universities in India
