= Shakatapuram =

Shakatapuram Bhandigadi
- town
- Location in Karnataka, India Shakatapuram (India)
- Coordinates: 13.5677476°N 75.2670014°E
- Country: India
- State: Karnataka
- District: Chikkamagaluru

Languages
  - Official: Kannada
- Time zone: UTC+5:30 (IST)
- PIN: 577126
- Telephone code: 08265
- Vehicle registration: KA18
- Nearest town: Koppa, Sringeri
- Vidhan Sabha constituency: Koppa
- Website: http://shrividyapeetam.in/

Shakatapuram, also known by the name Bhandigadi, is a religious place for Hindus located in the Koppa taluk of the state of Karnataka, India. It is located near Sringeri and is situated on the banks of river Tunga. It is famous for a Hindu Math called Shri Vidya Peetam which is present at this place. The Kumbhabhishekam event held at this place attracts a number of devotees.

== History ==
The history of the Shri Vidya Peetam can be traced to a sadhu named Thotakacharya, who was a disciple of Adi Shankara and the first pontiff of the Uttaramnaya Jyotish Peetam, a Hindu institution, located in Badrinath. A sadhu named Sri Satya Theertha who was of the same lineage as Thotakacharya, came to Shakatapuram about six centuries ago and established the Shri Vidya Peetam. An idol of the Hindu God, Lakshmi Narayana was brought by Sri Satya Teertha from Badarinath and installed at Shakatapuram. This is the presiding deity of this place. The Hindu Gods, Krishna, Raja Rajeshwari and Dattatreya are also worshipped here. The Math preaches the Advaita form of Hindu philosophy.

== Current scenario ==
The current pontiff of the Math is Sri Sri Sri Krishnananda Theertha Mahaswamigal who is the 33rd pontif to head this institution. He is a scholar in Kannada, Sanskrit and Vedanta and he became the head of this institution at the age of 13. He started touring India in 1994, to spread his message of goodwill and spirituality amongst the people.

In 1962, Sri Sri Ramachandrananda Theertha, the then pontiff of the Math established a branch at East Tambaram in Chennai.

== Kumbhabhisheka ==
Kumbhabhishekham was celebrated in the Math in 2001 and 2007. In 2001, the event were held to celebrate the installation of a temple to worship the Hindu Lord, Ganesha and the completion of 20 years of the pontificate of Sri Krishnananda Theertha Mahaswamigal. In 2007, the event attracted thousands of devotees from other states of India as well. This event was attended by the BJP leader, Murali Manohar Joshi. Horekanike (offerings of food articles) were made during this event.
