= St. John's Polytechnic =

- Motto: Love Service Hope
- Type: Education and Private institution
- Established: 1992
- Principal: S G Hasabi
- Director: Rev. Fr. Bijoy Scaria
- Location: Hubli, Karnataka, India
- Website: http://stjohnspolytechnic.com

St. John's Polytechnic in Hubli, Karnataka, India, was founded in 1992.

== History ==
St.John's Polytechnic was started by the Mitra Charitable Trust, composed of the members J.T. Mathias, P.V. Alexander, Mrs. Dorothy Mathias and Mrs. Berna Alexander in the year 1992 with two branches, "Electronics and Communication" and "Computer Science Engineering", recognised by the Government of Karnataka and the Directorate of Technical Education, affiliated to B.T.E., Bangalore, Karnataka and approved by AICTE, New Delhi. In the year 2007 the Vincentian Congregation Fathers were also included with the Mitra Charitable Trust for a better functioning of it. The college has successfully completed 22 years and now has a third branch, "Civil Engineering", established in the year 2011.

== Campus ==
The campus is in Gopankoppa. It has four acres of land with well-furnished infrastructure including a playground behind the college, wide classrooms and well-equipped laboratories.

== Educational programs ==
SL NO	Department	Started in	Intake
01	Electronics and Communication Engineering	1992	40
02	Computer Science and Engineering	1992	40
03	Civil Engineering	2011	40

== See also ==
- List of educational institutions in Dharwad
