= Shree Kaleshwara Temple =

Hindu temple in Nerur, Maharashtra

Shree Kaleshwara Mandira
- श्री देव रामेश्वर मंदिर
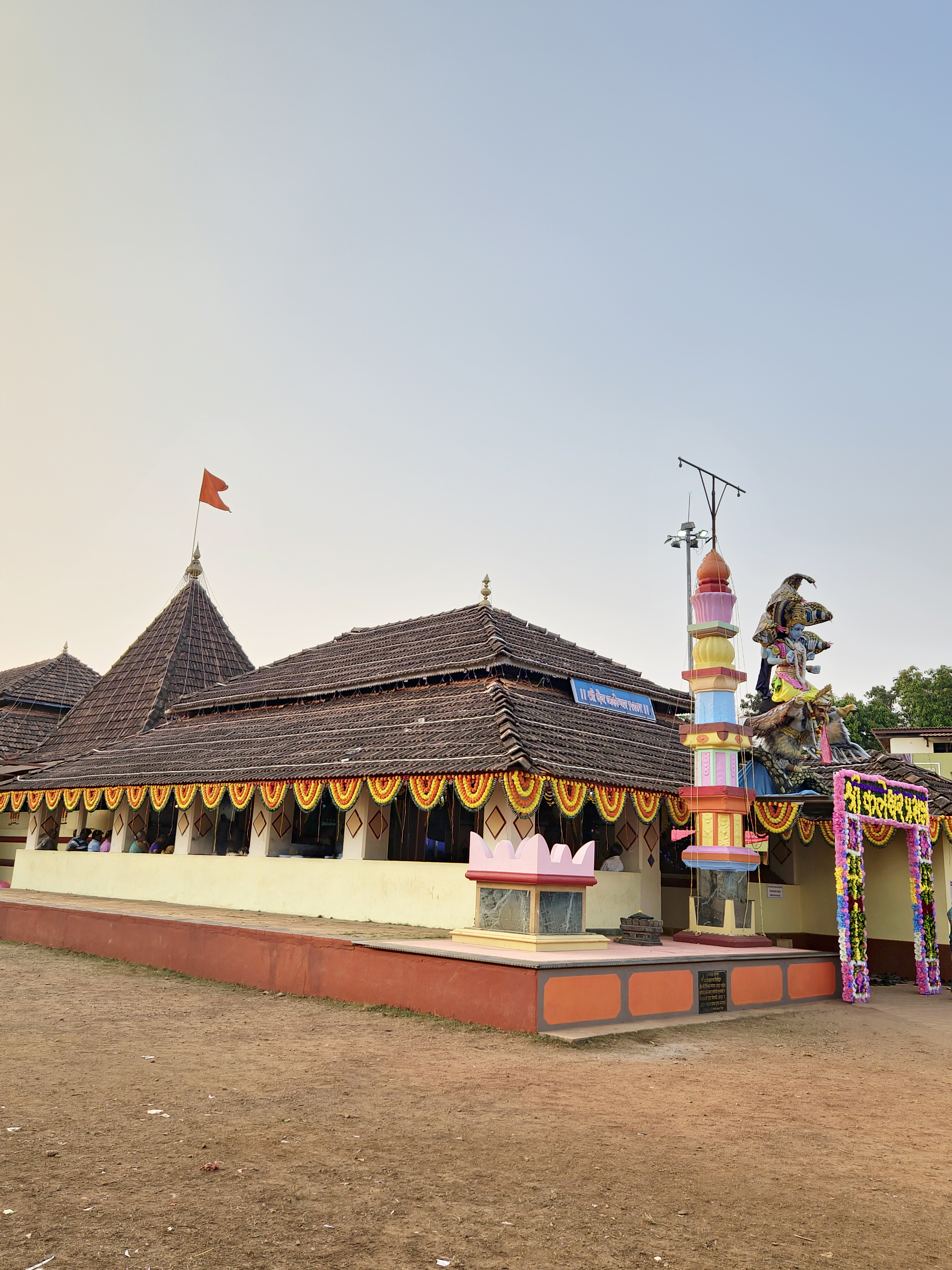
- Shree Kaleshwara Mandira

Religion
- Affiliation: Hinduism
- District: Sindhudurg
- Deity: Lord Kaleshwara (Lord Shiva)
- Festival: Maha Shivaratri

Location
- Location: Nerur
- State: Maharashtra
- Country: India
- Interactive map of Shree Kaleshwara Mandira
- Coordinates: 16°0′11″N 73°38′13″E

Architecture
- Completed: 16th Century
- Temple: 1

Website
- www.newconsys.com/kaleshwar.html

Shri Kaleshwar Mandir, Shree Kaleshwara Mandira (according to Marathi phonology § Vowels) or Shree Kaleshwara Devasthana (According to natives of Nerur village ) is a large Hindu temple in Nerur, Sindhudurg district in Maharashtra, India.

It is dedicated to the village deity, Shree Kaleshwara, who is also called Kaloba. The temple dates back 700 to 800 years, when, according to legend, a brahmin dug into the ground and discovered a natural lingam, an emblem of Shiva. The temple was founded on that spot, and the lingam is now enshrined in the temple's sanctum sanctorum.

The most important festival at Shree Kaleshwara Mandira is the five-day Mahashivaratri Utsava, in which the idol of Kaleshwara is drawn out of the temple in its chariot. The festival is accompanied by a fair and attracts visitors from great distances. Other festivals include Maghi Ganesha Utsava, celebrated in the month of Maagha, and Navratri Utsava.
