= Nerur, Maharashtra =

Nerur, Kudal
- village
- Location in Maharashtra, India
- Coordinates: 15°59′0″N 73°39′0″E
- Country: India
- State: Maharashtra
- District: Sindhudurg

Government
  - Body: Gram panchayat

Languages
  - Official: Marathi
  - Spoken: Malvani
- Time zone: UTC+5:30 (IST)
- ISO 3166 code: IN-MH
- Vehicle registration: MH-
- Website: maharashtra.gov.in

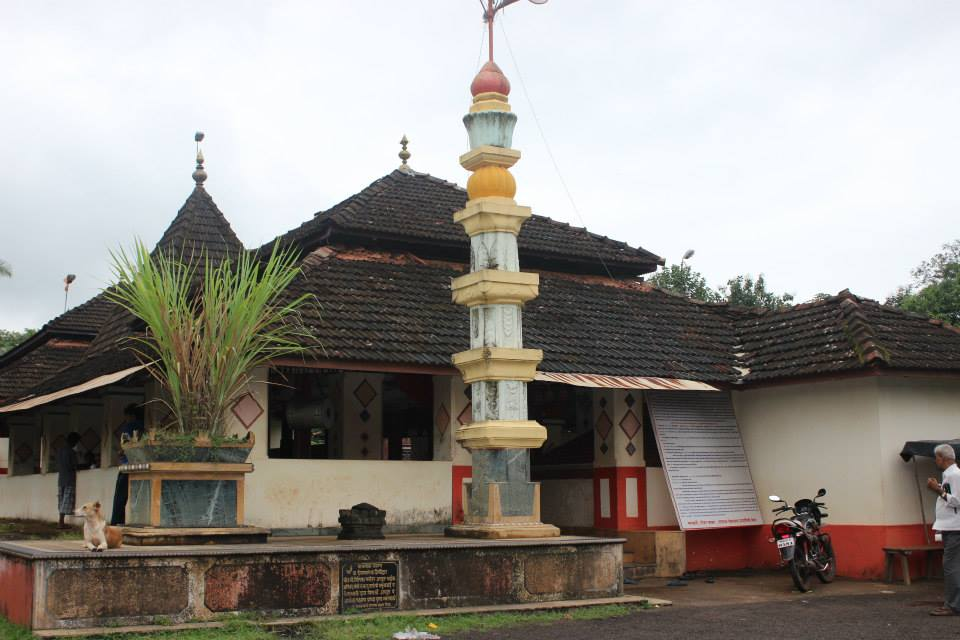
Front Gate of Shree Kaleshawara Temple

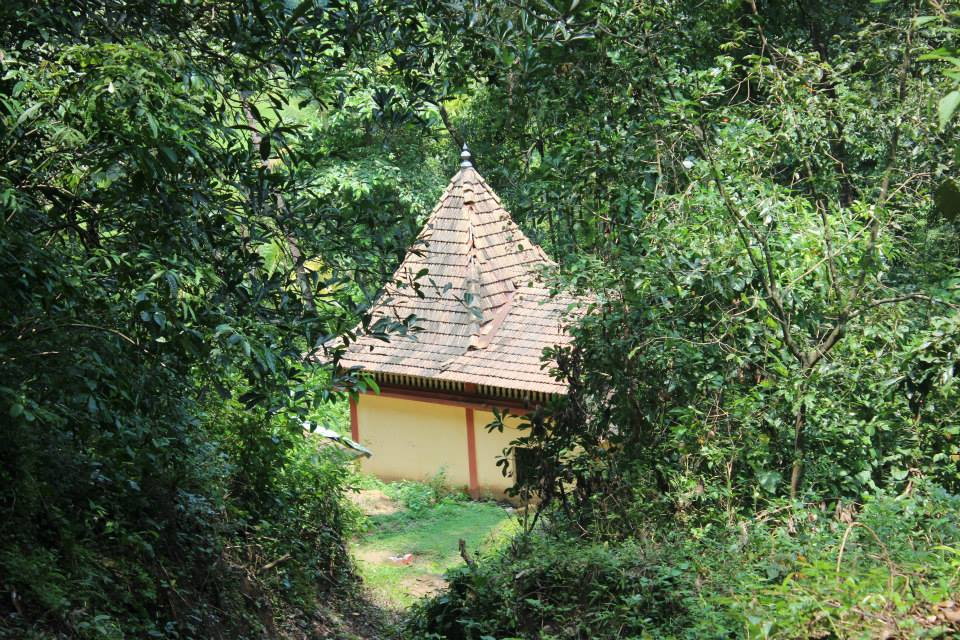
Shree Deva Kothari Brahamana Temple view from cliff in Kandareewadi, Nerur.

Nerur is a town of Kudal Taluka of Sindhudurg district (Sindhudurga in native Malvani language) of Maharashtra in India. It is one of the smaller towns in the district having 32 wadis. The Malvani dialect of Konkani is spoken here. Nerur is becoming an attraction amongst Indian and foreign tourists from Mumbai and Goa.

== Etymology ==
The name Nerur said to be derived from conjunction of two Dravidian words Neer (means Water) and Oor (Means village in Dravidian languages) literally means "Village of Waters", some suggested that it could be from Nera (Time in Tamil) and Oor, but proximity of this place with Kannada speaking region suggests the former is more suitable.

== Geography ==
Nerur is 7 km (4.3 mi) western side of Kudal and 480 km (300 mi) from Mumbai near the southern west coast of India, It is situated on the banks of Karli River bordering Malvan

== Vasundhara Science Center ==
Founded in 1995 as public charitable trust, situated on Kudal-Malvan Road near Nerurpar. This was founded by Mr. C. B. Naik an ex-Bank of India officer. Mission of this foundation is to provide scientific knowledge in remote villages. Vasundhara has organized "Science on Wheels" to reach aspiring students of remote villages in Maharashtra. Nearly 1200 students from 90 villages have benefited from this initiative.

== Nerurpar ==
Nerurpar is the westernmost part of Nerur village, it is situated on the banks of Karli river and famous for its scenery and backwaters.

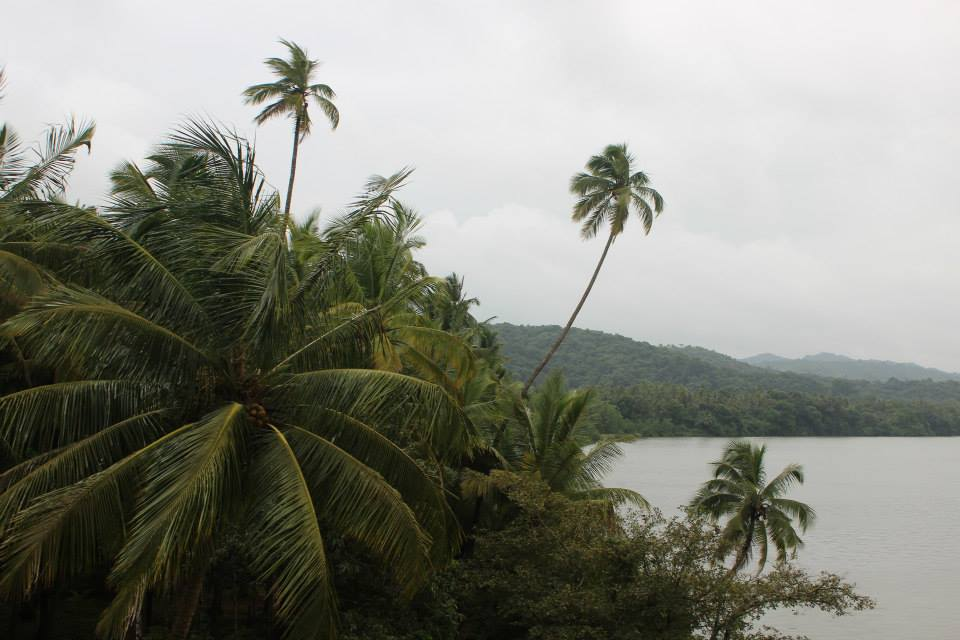
Bunch of coconut trees on the banks of Karli river in Nerurpar

== Temples ==
There are many temples in the town. Some of them are :

- Shree Kaleshwara Mandira,
- Shri Gawadoba
- Bhootnath Ravalnath.
- Shree Kothari Brahmana Mandira

The temple of Shree Deva Kaleshwara is also located in the area. During Shivaratri, a big jatra is held.

== Culture ==
Nerur is known for its Dashavatara play. The Dashavatara artist Mahadev Ramachandra (a.k.a. Babi Kalingan) was born in this village and he made Dashavatara Natya as one of the famous art form in Konkan. In 1994 he was honored by Akhil Bharatiya Marathi Natya Parishad for his contribution in Dashavatara Natya. Khele (खेळे in Malvani) is one of the famous art which takes place in Shimgotsava (or Holi) every year.

== Communities ==
The most common surnames of the people in the village include Naik, Nerurkar, Gawade, Raut, Rege, Parab, Fernandes and Prabhu. Chavhata, Jakat Naka and Nerurpar river areas are well populated.

== Distance ==
Nerur is just 6 km away from Kudal railway station, 9 km away from Mumbai Goa highway. The domestic Chipi airport is 14 km away and it is one hour 20 minutes drive away from Calangute Beach Goa.

Nerur is a famous place in kudal, maharashtra
