= Sarambal =

Village in Maharashtra

Coordinates: 16°1′44.76″N 73°38′26.52″E

- Village
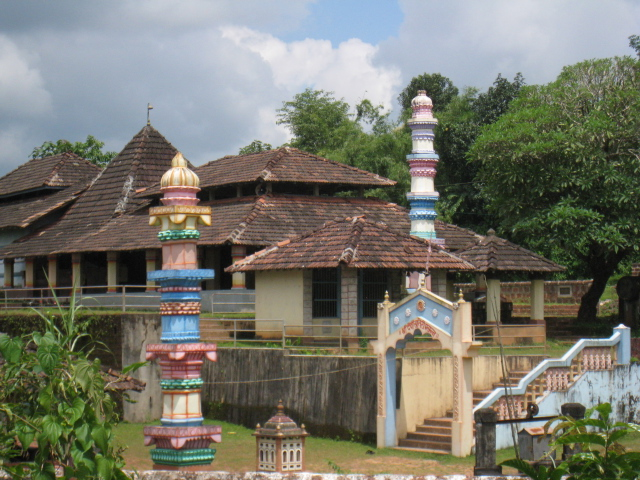
- Sarambal Sateri Devi Temple
- Interactive map of Sarambal
- Country: India
- State: Maharashtra

Sarambal is an ancient village located in Kudal taluka. Although Sarambal is predominantly Hindu and Muslim, there are several Christian societies located near Kavilkata (Kavil Gao) village.

A significant landmark in the village is the Ranstambha, constructed by the British in honor of the 52 Shahid Jawans from Sarambal who were killed during World War II and other conflicts.

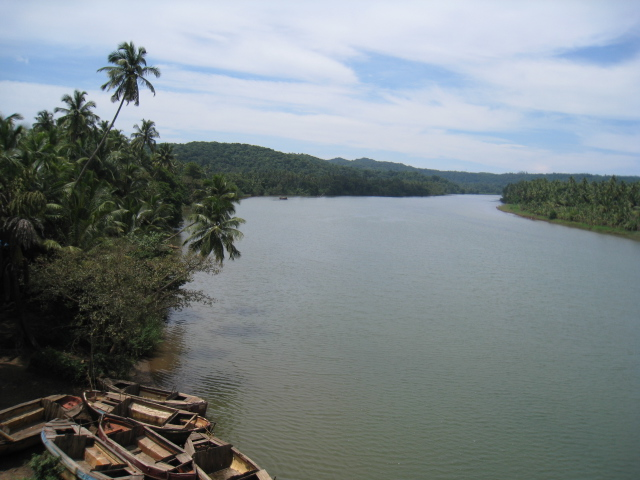
Karli River

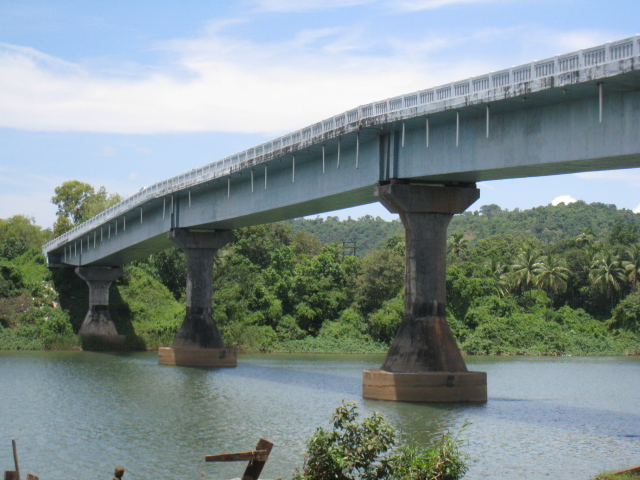
NerurPar Bridge
