= Kodlipet =

Kodlipete Doddakodli, Kodlipet
- Village
- Kodlipete
- Location in Karnataka, India
- Coordinates: 12.801109°N 75.887696°E
- Country: India
- State: Karnataka
- District: Kodagu
- Taluk: Somwarpet

Government
  - Body: Grama Panchayath

Area
  - Total: 5.40 km^{2} (2.08 sq mi)
- Elevation: 955 m (3,133 ft)

Population (2011)
  - Total: 3,769
  - Density: 698/km^{2} (1,810/sq mi)

Languages
  - Official: Kannada
- Time zone: UTC+5:30 (IST)
- PIN: 571231
- Telephone code: 08276
- Vehicle registration: KA-12

Kodlipete or Kodlipet is a village in Somwarpet taluk in Kodagu district of Karnataka, India. It is the northernmost town of Kodagu district.

As per census survey 2011, its location code number is 617862 (Doddakodli).

It lies on SH-27. Kodlipete is located at a distance of 31 km from taluk headquarter Somvarpete, 68 km from district headquarter Madikeri and 213 km from the state capital Bengaluru.

== Climate ==
Kodlipet experiences Hot & wet type of climate. Due to its proximity to Gorur dam, it experiences high humidity as well. Winters are dry and cold, with minimum temperatures dropping below 10°C. In 2022, it received 1,986 millimetres (78.2 in) of annual rainfall (23% above normal).
