= University of Horticultural Sciences, Bagalkot =

State University in Karnataka

- Type: Public
- Established: 2008
- Affiliations: UGC, ICAR
- Chancellor: Governor of Karnataka
- Vice-Chancellor: Dr. Vishnuvardhana
- Location: Bagalkote, Karnataka, India
- Campus: Rural
- Website: uhsbagalkot.edu.in

University of Horticultural Sciences, Bagalkot is a public university dedicated to the study and research of Horticultural Sciences established by the Government of Karnataka at Bagalkot district.

Due to rising importance of Horticulture, the University of Horticultural Sciences, Bagalkot was established by the Government of Karnataka through a special ordinance (no.2 of 2008) on 22/11/2008 and duly enacted by Karnataka Act no-11 of 2010 dated 13/05/2010.

== Headquarters ==
Bagalkot was chosen for its headquarters as the district is known for its rich horticultural production base of grapes, pomegranate, banana, guava, fig, lime, sapota, ber, vegetables, beetle vine, coconut, spices, and medicinal plants.

The district is surrounded by Belgaum in the west, Dharwad and Koppal in the south, Bijapur in the north, and Raichur in the east, which are hubs for the production of grape, mango, pomegranate, flowers and vegetables.

The area has a congenial climate for all kinds of crops besides its rich historical and cultural heritage making it an ideal place for the university. The mighty Almatti Dam is a backbone for both agri- and horticultural activity.

== Colleges ==
It has the following colleges:

- College of Horticulture, Bidar
- College of Horticulture, Bagalkote
- College of Horticulture, Bangalore
- College of Horticulture, Sirsi
- College of Horticulture, Kolar
- College of Horticulture, Mysore
- College of Horticulture, Munirabad
- KRRCH, Arabhavi, Belagavi
- CHEFT, Devihosur, Haveri
- College of Horticulture, Almel

== See also ==
- University of Agricultural Sciences, Dharwad
- University of Agricultural and Horticultural Sciences, Shimoga
- University of Agricultural Sciences, Raichur
- University of Agricultural Sciences, Bangalore
