= S R Mahadeva Prasanna =

S. R. M. Prasanna (born 8 July 1971), a Senior Member of the IEEE, presently holds the position of Director at the Indian Institute of Information Technology Dharwad, India from May 2024 onwards.

== Career ==
Prior to his current role, he served as a Professor (2017-2024) in the Department of Electrical, Electronics and Communication Engineering at Indian Institute of Information Technology Dharwad. Before this as Professor (2012-2017), Associate Professor(2007-2012), and an Assistant Professor(2004-2007) within the Department of Electronics and Electrical Engineering at IIT Guwahati in Guwahati, India. His work has garnered more than 5800 citations, with a H-Index of 38. He has completed his PhD, IIT Madras, 2004, M.tech, NITK Surathkal (then KREC Surathkal), 1997 B.tech,SSIT Tumakuru (then with Bangalore University), 1994.

== Awards ==
- President of India National Award for Teachers (2023).

== Books authored ==
- Speech, Audio, Image and Biomedical Signal Processing using Neural Networks. Publisher: Springer (2008)
- Advances in Communication and Computing (Lecture Notes in Electrical Engineering). Publisher: Springer (2016)
- Speech and Computer. Publisher: Springer (2023)
