= Sana College of Information Science & Management =

Sana Educational Charitable Trust's Sana College of Information Science & Management, Hubli, Karnataka State, India, began in 2003 under the guidance of Prof. Abdul Kareem and his team.

The Bachelor of Business Administration, Bachelor of Computer Applications, and Post Graduation Diploma in Computer Applications are affiliated to Karnataka University Dharwad.
