= Vandse =

- village
- Location in Karnataka, India Vandse (India)
- Coordinates: 13°42′N 74°45′E
- Country: India
- State: Karnataka
- District: Udupi

Government
  - Type: Panchayati raj (India)
  - Body: Gram panchayat

Languages
  - Official: Kannada, Kunda kannada
- Time zone: UTC+5:30 (IST)
- Postal code: 576233
- ISO 3166 code: IN-KA
- Vehicle registration: KA 20
- Lok Sabha constituency: Shivamogga
- Vidhana Sabha constituency: Byndoor
- Website: karnataka.gov.in

Vandse is a village in Kundapura taluk (sub district) of Udupi district, Karnataka state, India. The population is about 2500. Chakra River is running along the village.

Colloquially, Vandse is known as the trading capital of Kundapura taluk, now to serve as joint capital with Byndoor taluk, for the fact that it was one of the "first and oldest places" (goes back to the mid 1940's) within the Taluk to host a "Santhe" ( The Market Place), for trade, which even today is held every Friday. The market place was the brain child of Late Chittooru Sheenappa Shetty, a prominent General Merchant from the nearby village Maranakatte, who then wanted to bring all Traders and Farmers of the nearby villages to one common place so that it could serve as a platform for exchange of goods and services.
