= KLE University's College of Pharmacy =

College in Karnataka, India

- Type: Private
- Established: 1985
- Parent institution: KLE University, Belgaum
- Location: Hubballi, Karnataka, India; 15.3667282°N 75.1225819°E
- Campus: Urban
- Language: English
- Website: http://www.klescoph.org/

KLE University's College Of Pharmacy (KLESCOPH) is a private institute for higher education in pharmacy in Hubli, Karnataka, India. It was established in 1985 by the KLE Society.

== Accreditation ==
KLESCOPH College is affiliated under Rajiv Gandhi University of Health Sciences, (RGUHS) Karnataka. All Programs (Bachelor of Pharmacy, Master of Pharmacy and Doctorate) are approved by All India Council of Technical Education, an accreditation agency for higher education.

== Ranking ==
University and college rankings

Pharmacy – India
- NIRF (2024): 42

KLE University's College Of Pharmacy was ranked 42nd in the National Institutional Ranking Framework (NIRF) pharmacy ranking in 2024.
