= Balehonnur =

- Village
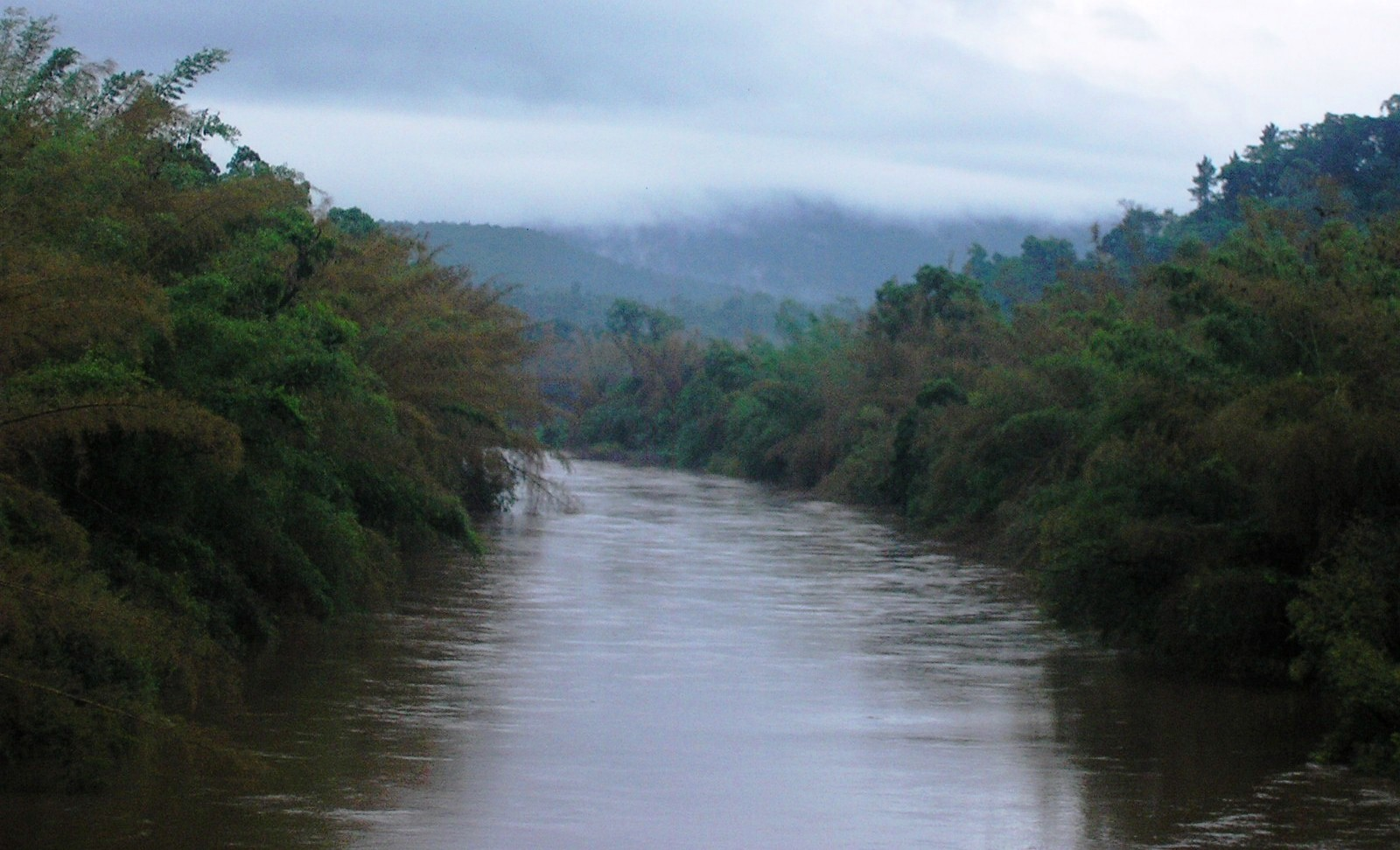
- Bhadra River

- Location in Karnataka, India
- Coordinates: 13.35°N 75.46°E
- Country: India
- State: Karnataka
- District: Chikkamagaluru
- Region: Malenadu

Government
  - Body: Village Panchayath

Area
  - Total: 20.2823 km^{2} (7.8310 sq mi)
- Elevation: 735 m (2,411 ft)

Population (2011)
  - Total: 11,137
  - Density: 549.10/km^{2} (1,422.2/sq mi)

Languages
  - Official: Kannada
- Time zone: UTC+5:30 (IST)
- PIN: 577 112
- Telephone code: 08266
- Vehicle registration: KA-18

Balehonnur is a small town in Narasimharajapura taluk, of Chikkamagaluru district in the Indian state of Karnataka. It comes under the jurisdiction of B.Kanbur Grama Panchayath. As per census survey 2011, its location code number is 609097.

It is famous for being the oldest Dharma Peetha among the five Panchapeethas-Rambhapuri Peetha of Veerashaiva sect of the Hindu religion. Balehonnur is located around 50 km northwest of Chikmagalur.

== History ==
According to Hindu mythology, it is said that Shiva himself came out of the linga in human form as Paramacharya Renukacharya.

Baba Bandesha dargah is located in the main road of the city and yearly traditional "Urs" is celebrated every year.

== Geography ==
Its geographical map coordinates are 13° 21' 0" North, 75° 28' 0" east. It is located 286 kilometers west of Bengaluru, 226 kilometers north-west of Mysuru and 142 kilometers north-east of Mangaluru. It is located on the bank of Bhadra River.

== Balehonnur Bridge ==
Balehonnur Bridge (a masonry bridge), constructed across the river Bhadra by the Madras Presidency/Madras Govt., was the first project undertaken by Mysore Construction Co.(MCC) in 1946.

== Transport ==
=== Road ===
Balehonnur is well-connected by road, State Highway 27 passes through Balehonnur, which connects it to the National Highway 169 at Sringeri due northwest and National Highway 173 due southeast.

=== Rail ===
The closest railway stations are in Chikmagalur (53 km), Shivamogga (87 km) and Kadur (90 km). But considering the connectivity constraints of Shivamogga and limited trains from Chikkamagaluru, Kadur is the most appropriate boarding Udupi railway station is another option for railway.

=== Air ===
The closest Airports are Kuvempu Airport, Shivamogga (78 km) and International Airport is Mangalore Airport (132 km).

== Climate ==
Climate data for Balehonnur (1991–2020, extremes 1933–2020)
| Month | Jan | Feb | Mar | Apr | May | Jun | Jul | Aug | Sep | Oct | Nov | Dec | Year |
|---|---|---|---|---|---|---|---|---|---|---|---|---|---|
| Record high °C (°F) | 36.0 (96.8) | 35.6 (96.1) | 38.0 (100.4) | 39.2 (102.6) | 38.6 (101.5) | 37.0 (98.6) | 31.4 (88.5) | 30.4 (86.7) | 31.4 (88.5) | 34.0 (93.2) | 34.0 (93.2) | 35.8 (96.4) | 39.2 (102.6) |
| Mean daily maximum °C (°F) | 28.5 (83.3) | 30.5 (86.9) | 32.4 (90.3) | 32.1 (89.8) | 30.4 (86.7) | 26.5 (79.7) | 24.3 (75.7) | 24.3 (75.7) | 26.0 (78.8) | 26.9 (80.4) | 26.9 (80.4) | 27.2 (81.0) | 28.0 (82.4) |
| Mean daily minimum °C (°F) | 14.0 (57.2) | 14.9 (58.8) | 17.3 (63.1) | 18.8 (65.8) | 19.4 (66.9) | 19.2 (66.6) | 18.9 (66.0) | 18.9 (66.0) | 18.5 (65.3) | 18.3 (64.9) | 16.7 (62.1) | 14.5 (58.1) | 17.5 (63.5) |
| Record low °C (°F) | 6.7 (44.1) | 8.0 (46.4) | 10.5 (50.9) | 11.1 (52.0) | 12.0 (53.6) | 9.6 (49.3) | 11.1 (52.0) | 11.2 (52.2) | 10.6 (51.1) | 9.1 (48.4) | 8.9 (48.0) | 7.3 (45.1) | 6.7 (44.1) |
| Average rainfall mm (inches) | 2.2 (0.09) | 5.0 (0.20) | 19.9 (0.78) | 105.7 (4.16) | 119.7 (4.71) | 448.8 (17.67) | 816.2 (32.13) | 612.3 (24.11) | 242.4 (9.54) | 180.0 (7.09) | 73.4 (2.89) | 7.9 (0.31) | 2,633.4 (103.68) |
| Average rainy days | 0.3 | 0.4 | 2.1 | 6.3 | 7.4 | 19.4 | 26.7 | 24.5 | 14.6 | 10.4 | 4.2 | 0.9 | 117.2 |
| Average relative humidity (%) (at 17:30 IST) | 79 | 78 | 77 | 83 | 84 | 89 | 92 | 92 | 89 | 87 | 83 | 78 | 84 |
Source: India Meteorological Department

=== Rainfall ===
As per KSNDMC, in 2022, Balehonnur hobli received an annual rainfall of 2,592 millimetres (102.0 in).

Rainfall recorded in Balehonnur in recent years given in the below table.

| Year | Rainfall In mm |
|---|---|
| 2023 | 1655 |
| 2022 | 2857 |
| 2021 | 2113 |
| 2020 | 1863 |
| 2019 | 2387 |
| 2018 | 2738 |
