= University of Agricultural Sciences, Raichur =

State University in Karnataka, India

University of Agricultural Sciences
- Type: Public
- Established: 2009
- Affiliations: UGC
- Chancellor: Governor of Karnataka
- Vice-Chancellor: Dr. M. Hanumantappa
- Location: Raichuru, Karnataka, India
- Campus: Rural
- Website: Official Website

University of Agricultural Sciences (UAS), Raichur is a Public university exclusively dedicated to the study and research of agricultural sciences established by the Government of Karnataka at Raichur district through the University of Agricultural Sciences Act, 2009.

== History ==
Raichur is privileged of being an oldest establishment for agricultural research in 1932 an Agricultural Research Station was established by the then Nizam’s Government of Hyderabad with a mandate to carryout research on dry land farming. After the reorganization of states in the country, Raichur was identified as the main research station for oilseeds. With the establishment of State Agricultural University in Karnataka in 1964 at Bangalore, it was elevated to Regional Research Station with a jurisdiction of five districts of Northern Karnataka. Agricultural Engineering Institute (AEI) was added to Raichur campus in 1969 to offer diploma course in Agri-Engineering which, in 1987, was upgraded to the status of College of Agricultural Engineering with up-gradation of Diploma to B.Tech degree. In 1984 and 2000, Colleges of Agriculture were started functioning, one at Raichur and the other at Bheemarayanagudi (Shahapur Taluk of Kalaburgi District) respectively, with an intake capacity of 30 students. However, with establishment of University of Agricultural Sciences, Dharwad during 1986, Raichur became the component campus under UAS, Dharwad. Intriguingly, Raichur continued its privilege of being the second largest campus and a major hub of education under UAS, Dharwad. The Post-graduate degree program leading to Master’s degree in eight departments was started in 1995 with an intake capacity of five students for each department every year. In 1994, Krishi Vigyana Kendra (KVK), a component of UAS, Dharwad but funded and monitored by ICAR, started functioning in the campus and received the best Krishi Vigyan Kendra National Award for the year 2007-08, thus completing all the necessities of Teaching, Research and Extension. During 2008-09 and 2009–10, PG program began in other departments, thus making a total of 13 departments offering Post Graduate program at the campus level. The Raichur campus has registered significant growth in last decade reaching newer heights in education, research and extension.

== See also ==
- University of Agricultural Sciences, Dharwad
- University of Agricultural and Horticultural Sciences, Shimoga
- University of Agricultural Sciences, Bangalore
- University of Horticultural Sciences, Bagalkot
