= University of Agricultural and Horticultural Sciences, Shimoga =

University in Karnataka, India

Coordinates: 13.28°N 75.34°E

Keladi Shivappa Nayaka University of Agricultural and Horticultural Sciences
- Motto: Negila Meleye Nintide Dharma (ನೇಗಿಲ ಮೇಲೆಯೇ ನಿಂತಿದೆ ಧರ್ಮ)
- Type: Public
- Established: 2012; 14 years ago
- Chancellor: Governor of Karnataka
- Vice-Chancellor: M. V. Dhananjaya
- Location: Iruvakki, Sagara, Shivamogga, Karnataka, India, India
- Campus: Rural
- Website: uahs.edu.in

The Keladi Shivappa Nayaka University of Agricultural and Horticultural Sciences, Shivamogga (KSNUAHS) is a university in the Indian state of Karnataka. It is the state's first integrated university to have both agricultural and horticultural sciences under its purview.

== History ==
KSNUAHS was established under Karnataka Act No. 38 of 2012, vide notification no. Sam. Vya. Sha. ilakhe, 19 Shasana 2012, dated 21 September 2012, published in the Special Gazette of Karnataka, part IV – A, No. 656, on 21-09-2012. The university was created by separating seven districts from the jurisdictional area of University of Agricultural Sciences, Bangalore and including all the institutes that came under the University of Horticultural Sciences, Bagalkot. The jurisdictional area of KSNUAHS, Shimoga covers the districts of Shimoga district, Chikkamagaluru district, Udupi district, Dakshina Kannada district, Kodagu district, Davanagere district and Chitradurga district.

KSNUAHS came into independent existence on 1 April 2013 with P.M. Salimath serving as Special Officer. Later in 2014, C. Vasudevappa, formerly the dean of post graduation studies at University of Agricultural Sciences, Bangalore, was appointed as the first Vice-Chancellor. P. Narayanaswamy replaced Vasudevappa in July 2017 and Manjunatha K. Naik replaced him in April 2018.

== Campus ==
The headquarters of KSNUAHS, Shivamogga, is connected to the state capital, Bengaluru by road (NH 206) and NH 13 also passes through the city. It is also connected to Bengaluru by a five-hour train ride, Nearest Railway Station to reach Iruvakki main campus is "Anandapuram (ANF)" in Bengaluru-Talguppa & Mysuru-Talguppa train routes. The nearest airport is Shivamogga Airport (RQY), which is 60 km from University Main Campus Iruvakki. Kempegowda International Airport or BLR, which is 270 km away and Mangaluru International Airport 189 km. Hubballi Domestic Airport 201 km distance. There are regular Janshatabdi & Intercity SF Express trains available from Bengaluru, Mysuru, Hassan, Tumakuru, Chennai, Tirupathi. Those coming from Mumbai, Chennai, New Delhi, Secunderabad, Vizag, Jaipur, Ahmedabad, Coimbatore can reach up to Birur Jn. (RRB) from Birur Shivamogga is just 60 km away. Regular city buses available every 15 minute once in this route from Gopala, SN Market, HPC, Jayanagar, Usha nursing home city bus stops.

Vision & Mission Vision:

To strengthen and excel in Agricultural Education, Research and Extension for sustainable Agricultural Development To develop technocrats, technologies, disseminators by providing a strong knowledge base To inspire socio-cultural value-based thinking for harnessing our natural resources with a sound technical foundation.

Mission:

To establish the university as an institution providing professional education, consultancy, and research and development solutions for sector growth, with output in agricultural, horticultural, forestry, and allied sciences, as well as contract services in public and private domains at national and international levels.

Mandate Imparting education towards the development of quality human resource in different branches of Agriculture, Horticulture, Forestry and allied sciences. Furthering advancement of learning and conducting research in Agriculture, Horticulture, Forestry and other allied Sciences. Undertaking the Extension Education of Sciences and Technologies especially for the farming and rural people of the State. Promoting partnership and linkages with National and International Educational Research institutions and industries.

== Affiliated colleges ==
It has the following colleges:

- College of Agriculture, Navile, Shivamogga
- College of Horticulture, Mudigere
- College of Horticulture, Hiriyur
- College of Agricultural Sciences, Iruvakki, Sagara
- Agricultural Diploma Institute, Brahmavar
- Agricultural Diploma Institute, Kathalagere

Krishi Vigyana Kendra Working Under KSNUAHS: 1. KVK, Shivamogga, Navile, Shivamogga 2. KVK, Udupi, Brahmavara 3. KVK Chikkamagaluru, Mudigere 4. KVK Chitradurga, Hiriyur

Research Stations Working Under KSNUAHS: 1. ZAHRS, Navile, Shivamogga 2. ZAHRS, Mudigere 3. ZAHRS, Hiriyur 4. ZAHRS, Brahmavara 5. MAHRS, Iruvakki

Special Research Stations Working at KSNUAHS: 1. Organic Farming Research Centre (OFRC), Navile, Shivamogga 2. Areca Research Centre, Navile, Shivamogga 3. Cashew Technology Centre, Shivamogga 4. Centre for Climate & Meteorology, COA, Navile, Shivamogga

== Academic programmes ==
University presently offers degree programs in Agriculture, Horticulture and Forestry disciplines. Ph.D. programs in five disciplines, Master's degree in 14 disciplines consisting of six in Agriculture, College of Agriculture Shivamogga, Five in Horticulture, College of Horticulture Mudigere, and two in Forestry, Forestry College, Ponnampet. At present, a two-year Diploma in Agriculture course is being offered at Agricultural and Horticultural Research Station, Kathalagere, and Zonal Agricultural and Horticultural Research Station, Brahmavar.

== Student life ==
=== Student forums ===
College of Agriculture, Shivamogga students have a students forum 'SOGADU'. This will organize unique programs like KANNADA HUNNIME-a monthly program, Say Thanks to Farmers, State level Poetry competition, National Level Short Film contest, etc.

=== Krishi Mela ===
KSNUAHS has been conducting Krishi Mela, an agricultural fair, annually from 2013. The event takes place for 3–5 days where there will be exhibition of agricultural technologies from various parts of the country, private sectors will also participate. Agricultural scientists will be available for farmers to solve their farming issues as well. This mega event involves an iconic display of the technologies developed by the university.

== See also ==
- University of Agricultural Sciences, Dharwad
- University of Agricultural Sciences, Bangalore
- University of Agricultural Sciences, Raichur
- University of Horticultural Sciences, Bagalkot
