= Kudal =

Town in Maharashtra, India

- Census town
- Location in Maharashtra, India Kudal (India)
- Coordinates: 16.008°N 73.687°E
- Country: India
- State: Maharashtra
- District: Sindhudurg

Government
  - Type: Nagar panchayat
  - Body: nagarpanchayat
- Elevation: 18 m (59 ft)

Population (2011)
  - Total: 16,015
  - Rank: 4th in Sindhudurg

Language
  - Official: Marathi
  - Mostly Used: Malvani

Other Languages
- Time zone: UTC+5:30 (IST)
- Postal code: 416520
- Telephone code: 02362
- ISO 3166 code: IN-MH
- Vehicle registration: MH-07

Kudal is a census town in Sindhudurg district, Maharashtra, India. It is situated on River Karli in southwest Maharashtara. Kudal is the fourth largest town in Sindhudurg after Sawantwadi, Malvan and Kankavli. As of 2011, the population is 16,015. Kudal supports one MIDC area in the Konkan division. The Kudal railway station is located on the Konkan Railway route and connects the town with Mumbai metro situated in the Bombay, Baroda and Central India Railway of the north, and Mangalore on the south. It is a major stop for the Konkan Railway. The Deccan Odyssey train also stops in Kudal. National Highway 66 passes through Kudal. Apart from that, it also has two bus stations, a new one and old one. The old one is situated in market while the new one is just adjacent to the NH-66. Kudal is situated in centre of the Sindhudurg district and also considered one of the fastest-growing towns in the Konkan region. The Desai's were the original rulers of Kudal, who were tributaries of the Bijapur Sultanate, later the Marathas and then under the British.

== Prominence ==
The town is considered one of the most antique settlements of the Konkan Region. It has a market for Alphonso Mangoes, which is exported to various cities in India and also other countries. The town is renowned for the annual fair (Jatra), which is organized at the Kudaleshwar temple. Attractions in the town include the Rangana Garh Fort, Shree Devi Lakshmi Mandir, Shree Dev Bhairav-Jogeshwari Temple, Sateri Devi mandir, The Shree Maruti Mandir, Shree Devi Bhavani Mandir, Shree Devi Kelbai Mandir, Ghodebao, College of Horticulture Mudigere. This also has a village named Nerur which contains the biggest annual fair of Shri Dev Kaleswar which takes place in the temple of Shiva. It is believed that the temple is that of the origins of Shiva.

== Geography ==
Kudal is located at almost 16.9 kilometres (10.5 mi) from its district headquarters Oros and is 474 kilometres (295 mi) away from the capital city of the state, Mumbai by road (Mumbai-Goa highway NH-17 old numbering). It has an average elevation of 20 metres (66 ft). The climate is mostly coastal and humid. Annual temperature rises from 22 to 40 °C (72 to 104 °F). Kudal gets very heavy rainfall of 1,100 millimetres (43 in) per year.

== Demographics ==
As of 2011 India census, Kudal city had a population of 16,015 people. Males constitute 51% of the population and females 49%. Kudal has an average literacy rate of 78%, which is higher than the national average of 59.5%. Male literacy is 81%, and female literacy is 75%. In Kudal, 12% of the population is under 6 years of age.

== Transport ==
Kudal lies on the NH-66 from where coastal hamlets of Malvan and Tarkarli are accessible.

Kudal Railway station offers a convenient access point to visit the beach getaways of Malvan and Tarkarli (both 35 kilometres (22 mi)).

The earest Airport are Sindhudurg Airport(21 kilometres (13 mi)), Dabolim (103 kilometres (64 mi)), Belgaum (116 kilometres (72 mi)) and Hubli (192 kilometres (119 mi).

Kudal is connected by day train with Mumbai. Kudal is connected by overnight train with Mumbai, Cochin (Ernakulam), Ahmedabad, New Delhi. Kudal is connected by day bus with Mumbai, Pune, Ahmedabad. Kudal is connected by overnight bus with Mumbai, Pune, Ahmedabad. Kudal is connected by Goa-Mumbai highway. Kudal is in Maharashtra state. It is connected to Mumbai-Goa Highway. Kudal is accessible by road.

== Villages ==
- Sarambal
- Mandakuli
