= Indian Institute of Information Technology, Dharwad =

University in Karnataka, India

- Motto: ज्ञानेन विकासः (Sanskrit)
- Type: Public–private partnership
- Established: 2015
- Chairman: Dr. Sridhar Vembu
- Director: S R Mahadeva Prasanna
- Academic staff: 32
- Undergraduates: 925
- Doctoral students: 17
- Location: Dharwad, Karnataka, 580009, India; 15.392606°N 75.025404°E
- Campus: 60 acres (24 ha); Urban
- Language: English
- Website: iiitdwd.ac.in

The Indian Institute of Information Technology, Dharwad (IIIT Dharwad) is an Institute of National Importance set up under a non-profit, Public-Private-Partnership (PPP) model by the Ministry of Education (India). It is an academic and research institute funded by the Government of India, the Government of Karnataka and industry partner KEONICS.

== Organisation and administration ==
IIIT Dharwad is an autonomous institution headed by a chairperson with a board of governors, and a senate. IIIT Dharwad is a self-sustaining PPP institute where all running expenses including salaries are met by the tuition and other fees paid by students.

== Academics ==
=== Programmes ===
IIIT Dharwad offers Bachelor of Technology (B.Tech) and doctoral programs in following academic disciplines:

Degree	Specialization
Bachelor of Technology (B.Tech)	Computer Science and Engineering, Data Science and Artificial Intelligence, Electronics and Communication Engineering
Ph.D	Computer Science and Engineering, Data Science and Artificial Intelligence, Electronics and Communication Engineering, Physics, Mathematics, Humanities

=== Admissions ===
Admissions to undergraduate programs are made through Joint Seat Allocation Authority counselling process on the basis of rank obtained by the candidates in JEE-Main. Admissions for doctoral programs are made through a screening test followed by an interview

== Campus ==
The institute started functioning in 2015 in a temporary campus at IT Park in Hubli, and Prime Minister Narendra Modi laid the foundation stone for the construction of permanent campus buildings at Tadasinakoppa village near Dharwad in February 2019.

As of November 2021, construction of permanent campus for IIIT Dharwad is completed and academic operations have begun. The permanent campus of IIIT Dharwad is spread across 60 acre with academic block comprising 30 classrooms. Hostels for students are also constructed.There are 300 rooms for boys and 100 for girls.
