= Mudigere =

- Town
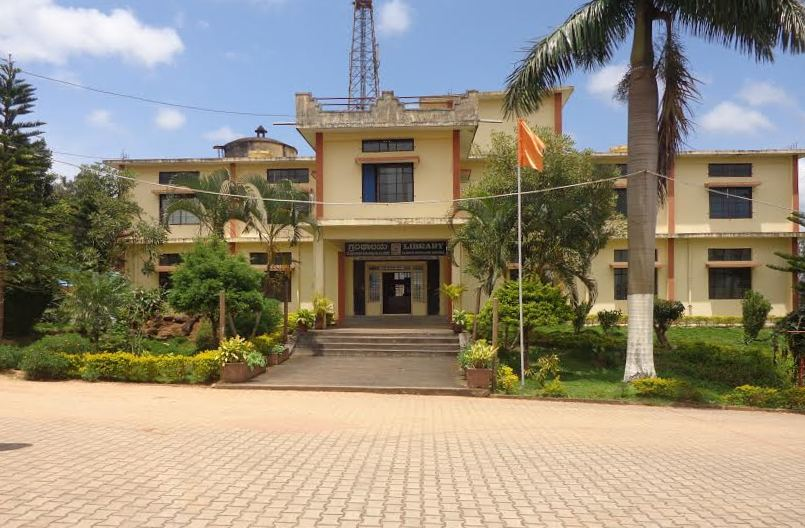
- Main library of the College of Horticulture in Mudigere

- Location in Karnataka, India
- Coordinates: 13.137°N 75.606°E
- Country: India
- State: Karnataka
- District: Chikmagalur
- Region: Malenadu

Government
  - Body: Town Panchayath

Area
  - Town: 3.5 km^{2} (1.4 sq mi)
  - Rural: 1,117 km^{2} (431 sq mi)
- Elevation: 990 m (3,250 ft)

Population (2011)
  - Town: 8,962
  - Density: 2,600/km^{2} (6,600/sq mi)
- Time zone: UTC+5:30 (IST)
- PIN: 577132
- ISO 3166 code: IN-KA
- Vehicle registration: KA-18
- Website: http://www.mudigeretown.mrc.gov.in

Mudigere is a Town and Taluk in Chikmagalur district in the Indian state of Karnataka. It is 30 km from the district headquarters.

Mudigere is known for its coffee and black pepper production.

== Geography and climate ==
Mudigere town is located at an average elevation of 990 m (3,250 ft) above MSL. Thus, it is the 4th highest Administrative Town in Karnataka, after Madikeri, Somwarpet and Chikmagalur.

The National Highway 73 and its auxiliary route National Highway 173 meet at Mudigere. These highways connect the town to Mangaluru, Tumakuru and Chitradurga. The nearest airport is at Mangalore International Airport which is at a distance of 128 km (80 mi).

== Demographics ==
As of 2001 India census, Mudigere had a population of 8,962. Males constituted 51% of the population and females 49%. Mudigere had an average literacy rate of 82%, higher than the national average of 59.5%: male literacy was 85%, and female literacy was 79%. In Mudigere in 2001, 10% of the population was under 6 years of age.

== Villages ==
There are twenty-nine Panchayath villages in Mudigere Taluk:

- B. Hosahalli (Bharatibylu)
- Balur
- Banakal
- Bettagere
- Bidarahalli
- Chinniga
- Coove
- Daradahalli
- Gonibeedu
- Halemudigere
- Hanthuru
- Hesagal (Belagola)
- Hornadu
- Idkani
- Javali
- Kalasa (Mavinakere)
- Kirugunda
- Kundur
- Makonahalli
- Marasanige
- Nandipura
- Niduvale
- Phalguni
- Samse
- Sunkasale
- Taruve
- Thotadur
- Tripura
- Urubage

== Tourist attractions ==
The temples Bettada Byraweshwara near Mekanagadde and Nanyada Byraweshwara near Byrapura (Hosakere), which lies 25 km south of Mudigere, Devaramane near Gutthi are popular tourist destinations in Mudigere. Ballalarayana Durga or Durgada Betta near Sunkasale grama is another trekking and tourist attraction. Travelling from Kottigehara to Kalasa gives an experience of coffee plantations and green hills of Mudigere taluk. Shankara Falls is located near Mudigere.

== Education ==
Mudigere has many private and Government schools and colleges including the College of Horticulture.

== Notable people ==
- Poornachandra Tejaswi
- Motamma
- V. G. Siddhartha

== See also ==
- Mangalore
- Nellyadi
- Charmadi
- Kudremukh
- Dharmasthala
- Ujire
