= Belthangady Assembly constituency =

Constituency of the Karnataka legislative assembly in India

Coordinates: 12.99°N 75.28°E

Belthangady
- Constituency No. 200 for the Karnataka Legislative Assembly

Constituency details
- Country: India
- Region: South India
- State: Karnataka
- District: Dakshina Kannada
- Lok Sabha constituency: Dakshina Kannada
- Established: 1956
- Total electors: 213,244
- Reservation: None

Member of Legislative Assembly
- 16th Karnataka Legislative Assembly
- Incumbent Harish Poonja
- Party: Bharatiya Janata Party
- Elected year: 2023
- Preceded by: K. Vasantha Bangera

Belthangady Assembly constituency is one of the 224 Vidhan Sabha (Legislative Assembly) constituencies of Karnataka in southwestern India.

== Overview ==
Belthangady (constituency number 200) is one of the eight Assembly constituencies located in Dakshina Kannada district. It covers the same area as the Belthangady Taluk.

Belthangady is part of Dakshina Kannada Lok Sabha constituency, along with seven other Vidhan Sabha constituencies, namely: 201. Moodabidri, 202. Mangalore City North, 203. Mangalore City South, 204. Mangalore, 205. Bantval, 206. Puttur and 207. Sullia (SC).

== Members of the Legislative Assembly ==
The contest for the Belthangady legislative seat has been a thirty year contest between the Gowda family and the Bangera family, as well as one between the two Bangera brothers, Vasantha and Prabhakara.

Election	Member	Party
1957	Ratnavarma Heggade	Indian National Congress
1962	Bantwal Vaikunta Baliga	Indian National Congress
1967	Bantwal Vaikunta Baliga	Indian National Congress
1968 By-election	K. Chidananda	Indian National Congress
1972	K. Subramanya Gowda	Indian National Congress
1978	K. Gangadhara Gowda	Indian National Congress
1983	K. Vasantha Bangera	Bharatiya Janata Party
1985	K. Vasantha Bangera	Bharatiya Janata Party
1989	K. Gangadhara Gowda	Indian National Congress
1994	K. Vasantha Bangera	Janata Dal
1999	K. Prabhakara Bangera	Bharatiya Janata Party
2004	K. Prabhakara Bangera	Bharatiya Janata Party
2008	K. Vasantha Bangera	Indian National Congress
2013	K. Vasantha Bangera	Indian National Congress
2018	Harish Poonja	Bharatiya Janata Party
2023	Harish Poonja	Bharatiya Janata Party

== Election results ==
=== Assembly Election 2023 ===
2023 Karnataka Legislative Assembly election : Belthangady
Party	Candidate	Votes	%	±%
BJP	Harish Poonja	101,004	53.44	▼1.37
INC	Rakshith Shivaram	82,788	43.80	▲1.78
SDPI	Akbar Belthangady	2,513	1.33	New
NOTA	None of the above	892	0.47	▼0.22
Margin of victory		18,216	9.64	▼3.16
Turnout		189,348	82.71	▲0.64
Total valid votes		189,007		
Registered electors		228,941		▲4.57
BJP hold		Swing	▼1.37	

=== Assembly Election 2018 ===
2018 Karnataka Legislative Assembly election : Belthangady
Party	Candidate	Votes	%	±%
BJP	Harish Poonja	98,417	54.81	▲9.17
INC	K. Vasantha Bangera	75,443	42.02	▼15.84
AIMEP	Jagannatha. M	1,806	1.01	New
JD(S)	Sumathi S. Hegde	1,612	0.90	▼1.18
NOTA	None of the above	1,245	0.69	New
Margin of victory		22,974	12.80	▲0.58
Turnout		179,689	82.07	▲6.59
Total valid votes		179,550		
Registered electors		218,935		▲12.93
BJP gain from INC		Swing	▼3.05	

=== Assembly Election 2013 ===
2013 Karnataka Legislative Assembly election : Belthangady
Party	Candidate	Votes	%	±%
INC	K. Vasantha Bangera	74,530	50.93	▲4.80
BJP	Ranjan. G. Gowda	58,789	45.64	▲11.99
CPI(M)	B. M. Bhat	4,532	3.52	New
JD(S)	Rajashree. S. Hegde	2,682	2.08	▼10.89
KJP	Sukhesha Kumar	2,673	2.08	New
BSP	Chennakeshava	1,747	1.36	▼0.24
JD(U)	Venkatesha Bende	1,276	0.99	New
Margin of victory		15,741	12.22	▼0.26
Turnout		146,325	75.48	▲0.85
Total valid votes		128,808		
Registered electors		193,864		▲12.04
INC hold		Swing	▲11.73	

=== Assembly Election 2008 ===
2008 Karnataka Legislative Assembly election : Belthangady
Party	Candidate	Votes	%	±%
INC	K. Vasantha Bangera	59,528	46.13	▲18.80
BJP	K. Prabhakara Bangera	43,425	33.65	▼3.61
JD(S)	K. Gangadhara Gowda	16,738	12.97	▼14.28
Independent	Thimarodi Mahesh Shetty	7,284	5.65	New
BSP	Raghu Dharma Sen	2,059	1.60	▼2.14
Margin of victory		16,103	12.48	▲2.55
Turnout		129,135	74.63	▼2.95
Total valid votes		129,034		
Registered electors		173,028		▲3.88
INC gain from BJP		Swing	▲8.87	

=== Assembly Election 2004 ===
2004 Karnataka Legislative Assembly election : Belthangady
Party	Candidate	Votes	%	±%
BJP	K. Prabhakara Bangera	48,102	37.26	▼4.20
INC	Harish Kumar. K	35,281	27.33	▼9.29
JD(S)	K. Vasantha Bangera	35,178	27.25	▲5.34
BSP	Chandu. L	4,823	3.74	New
Kannada Nadu Party	Janardhana Gowda	2,571	1.99	New
Independent	Venkappa Naik. I. N	2,012	1.56	New
Independent	Krishnappa Kotian. K	1,129	0.87	New
Margin of victory		12,821	9.93	▲5.09
Turnout		129,226	77.58	▲0.70
Total valid votes		129,096		
Registered electors		166,566		▲14.68
BJP hold		Swing	▼4.20	

=== Assembly Election 1999 ===
1999 Karnataka Legislative Assembly election : Belthangady
Party	Candidate	Votes	%	±%
BJP	K. Prabhakara Bangera	45,042	41.46	▲10.13
INC	K. Gangadhara Gowda	39,781	36.62	▲7.72
JD(S)	K. Vasantha Bangera	23,805	21.91	New
Margin of victory		5,261	4.84	▼2.34
Turnout		111,658	76.88	▼0.13
Total valid votes		108,628		
Rejected ballots		2,996	2.68	▲1.67
Registered electors		145,239		▲6.93
BJP gain from JD		Swing	▲2.95	

=== Assembly Election 1994 ===
1994 Karnataka Legislative Assembly election : Belthangady
Party	Candidate	Votes	%	±%
JD	K. Vasantha Bangera	39,871	38.51	New
BJP	K. Prabhakara Bangera	32,433	31.33	▲22.31
INC	K. Gangadhara Gowda	29,918	28.90	▼16.05
INC	Chandra Shekara Poojary	1,068	1.03	New
Margin of victory		7,438	7.18	▲5.85
Turnout		104,600	77.01	▲2.87
Total valid votes		103,535		
Rejected ballots		1,059	1.01	▼3.17
Registered electors		135,824		▲5.87
JD gain from INC		Swing	▼6.44	

=== Assembly Election 1989 ===
1989 Karnataka Legislative Assembly election : Belthangady
Party	Candidate	Votes	%	±%
INC	K. Gangadhara Gowda	40,964	44.95	▲3.53
Independent	K. Vasantha Bangera	39,754	43.62	New
BJP	K. Prabhakara Bangera	8,225	9.02	▼42.09
JP	J. B. Pereira	1,661	1.82	New
Margin of victory		1,210	1.33	▼8.36
Turnout		95,116	74.14	▲2.91
Total valid votes		91,138		
Rejected ballots		3,978	4.18	▲3.25
Registered electors		128,299		▲38.64
INC gain from BJP		Swing	▼6.16	

=== Assembly Election 1985 ===
1985 Karnataka Legislative Assembly election : Belthangady
Party	Candidate	Votes	%	±%
BJP	K. Vasantha Bangera	33,378	51.11	▼11.05
INC	Lokeshwari Vinayachandra	27,048	41.42	▲3.58
JP	M. S. Prabhakara Sampigethaya	4,146	6.35	New
Margin of victory		6,330	9.69	▼14.63
Turnout		65,922	71.23	▼0.66
Total valid votes		65,306		
Rejected ballots		616	0.93	▼0.41
Registered electors		92,543		▲14.67
BJP hold		Swing	▼11.05	

=== Assembly Election 1983 ===
1983 Karnataka Legislative Assembly election : Belthangady
Party	Candidate	Votes	%	±%
BJP	K. Vasantha Bangera	35,579	62.16	New
INC	K. Gangadhara Gowda	21,660	37.84	▲34.37
Margin of victory		13,919	24.32	▲6.79
Turnout		58,018	71.89	▼4.50
Total valid votes		57,239		
Rejected ballots		779	1.34	▼0.88
Registered electors		80,703		▲7.10
BJP gain from INC(I)		Swing	▲6.63	

=== Assembly Election 1978 ===
1978 Karnataka Legislative Assembly election : Belthangady
Party	Candidate	Votes	%	±%
INC(I)	K. Gangadhara Gowda	31,255	55.53	New
JP	K. Chidananda	21,388	38.00	New
INC	G. N. Bhide	1,952	3.47	▼54.50
Independent	M. S. Prabhakara Sampigethaya	1,463	2.60	New
Margin of victory		9,867	17.53	▼21.21
Turnout		57,563	76.39	▲7.54
Total valid votes		56,287		
Rejected ballots		1,276	2.22	▲2.22
Registered electors		75,354		▲22.00
INC(I) gain from INC		Swing	▼2.44	

=== Assembly Election 1972 ===
1972 Mysore State Legislative Assembly election : Belthangady
Party	Candidate	Votes	%	±%
INC	K. Subramanya Gowda	24,126	57.97	▲11.41
INC(O)	K. Chidananda	8,004	19.23	New
ABJS	Nemiraja Shetty	6,714	16.13	▲0.48
CPI(M)	K. V. Yelachithaya	2,220	5.33	New
SWA	Ishwara Bhat	552	1.33	▼20.37
Margin of victory		16,122	38.74	▲13.88
Turnout		42,526	68.85	▲2.01
Total valid votes		41,616		
Registered electors		61,764		▲16.05
INC hold		Swing	▲11.41	

=== Assembly Election 1967 ===
1967 Mysore State Legislative Assembly election : Belthangady
Party	Candidate	Votes	%	±%
INC	Bantwal Vaikunta Baliga	15,476	46.56	▲0.38
SWA	J. B. Pereira	7,213	21.70	▼14.36
Independent	K. R. Naika	5,345	16.08	New
ABJS	K. V. Nayak	5,203	15.65	New
Margin of victory		8,263	24.86	▲14.74
Turnout		35,574	66.84	▲6.53
Total valid votes		33,237		
Registered electors		53,223		▼10.69
INC hold		Swing	▲0.38	

=== Assembly Election 1962 ===
1962 Mysore State Legislative Assembly election : Belthangady
Party	Candidate	Votes	%	±%
INC	Bantwal Vaikunta Baliga	15,991	46.18	▼23.57
SWA	K. B. Jinaraja Hegde	12,486	36.06	New
Independent	Rama Naik	4,730	13.66	New
ABJS	Vishwanath Shenoy	1,418	4.10	New
Margin of victory		3,505	10.12	▼29.37
Turnout		35,940	60.31	▲8.33
Total valid votes		34,625		
Registered electors		59,594		▲5.07
INC hold		Swing	▼23.57	

=== Assembly Election 1957 ===
1957 Mysore State Legislative Assembly election : Belthangady
Party	Candidate	Votes	%	±%
INC	Ratnavarma Heggade	20,563	69.75	New
Independent	Shenoy Ramanath	8,920	30.25	New
Margin of victory		11,643	39.49	
Turnout		29,483	51.98	
Total valid votes		29,483		
Registered electors		56,721		
INC win (new seat)				
