= Manjayya Heggade =

Indian philanthropist, educationist and legislator (1889–1955)

Dharmasthala Manjayya Heggade
- Kamat's Potpourri
- Title: Heggade/Hegde

Personal life
- Born: South Canara, Madras Presidency, British India

Religious life
- Religion: Jain

Senior posting
- Based in: Dharmastala, Karnataka, India
- Post: Dharma Adhikari of Dharmasthala Manjunatha Temple
- Period in office: 1918–1955
- Predecessor: Chandayya Heggade
- Successor: Ratnavarma Heggade

Dharmasthala Manjayya Heggade (1889–1955) was an Indian philanthropist, educationist and legislator who is best known for being the hereditary administrator (Dharmadhikari) of the Dharmasthala Manjunatha Temple from 1918 to 1955.

== Early life ==
Born in 1889 in a family called the Pergade. The Pergades were the hereditary trustees of the Dharmasthala Manjunatha Temple and the feudal lords of the temple town of Dharmasthala. Manjayya completed his education in Mangalore and after the death of his uncle Chandayya Heggade, succeeded to the post of Dharma Adhikari of the manjunatha temple at the age of 29 in 1918.

== Career ==
On becoming the dharmadhikari, the first major task manjayya undertook was the eradication of Malaria, that had caused havoc in the temple town of Dharmasthala.Heggade also started a Sarva Dharma Sammelan in 1932 in Dharmasthala for inter faith dialogue. It has become an annual feature since then. Heggade's philanthropic activities also extended to the field of education.he started the first high school in the Belthangady taluk in 1918 and donated vast lands and money for this purpose. He wanted that the education imparted here should be based upon moral and spiritual heritage and hence he found in 1940 an institution called Siddavana Gurukula. The institution imparted education on the model of ancient Gurukul system involving spiritual education with moral background. Heggade also served as a legislator in the Madras Legislative Council and was known for his oratory skills. Heggade died on 31 August 1955.
