= Harish Poonja =

Indian politician

Member of the Karnataka Legislative Assembly
- Incumbent
- Assumed office 2018
- Preceded by: K. Vasantha Bangera
- Constituency: Belthangady

Personal details
- Born: 17 June 1982 (41 years) Belthangady, Dakshina Kannada
- Party: Bharatiya Janata Party
- Spouse: Dr. Sweekrita Shetty
- Children: 2
- Parents: Muttanna Poonja (father); Nalini Poonja (mother)
- Education: LLB
- Alma mater: Mangalore University
- Occupation: Politician
- Profession: MLA & Director

Harish Poonja (Kannada: ಹರೀಶ್ ಪೂಂಜ) is an Indian politician and member of the legislative assembly from Bharatiya Janata Party representing Belthangady constituency in Dakshina Kannada.

== Controversies ==
Former MLA Vasanth Bangera and congress party workers organized a protest outside his office demanding to reveal the accounts for a flood relief fund setup under Harish Poonja's leadership.

A team of local villagers from Dharmasthala, met with Poonja requesting that he not issue any permissions for construction of hotels and guest houses in the temple town since it will lead to desecration of the place.

On 7 February 2024 (Wednesday), Mr. Poonja wrote on the X (Twitter) that using the tax paid by Hindus for the welfare of other religious people is an injustice to Hindus. “Hindus’ tax, Hindus’ right”. He justified his controversial remark that “from the current financial year, the tax paid by Hindus should be used only for the welfare of Hindus.”

== Political career ==
In the 15th Karnataka Assembly election, Poonja defeated K. Vasantha Bangera, a five-time MLA from the Indian National Congress with a margin of 22,974 votes.

In the 16th Karnataka Assembly election, Harish Poonja was re-elected as the MLA for Belthangady constituency with a substantial lead of 18,216 votes, defeating Rakshith Shivaram from the Indian National Congress.

== Personal life ==
Harish Poonja was attracted to RSS ideology as early as 6th year. He went to Balashaka near his village Padangadi in Belthangady Taluk. He studied in Kannada Medium School in his village. His parents still live in the village with their agricultural occupation.
