= Dharmasthala mass burial case =

Police investigation in India

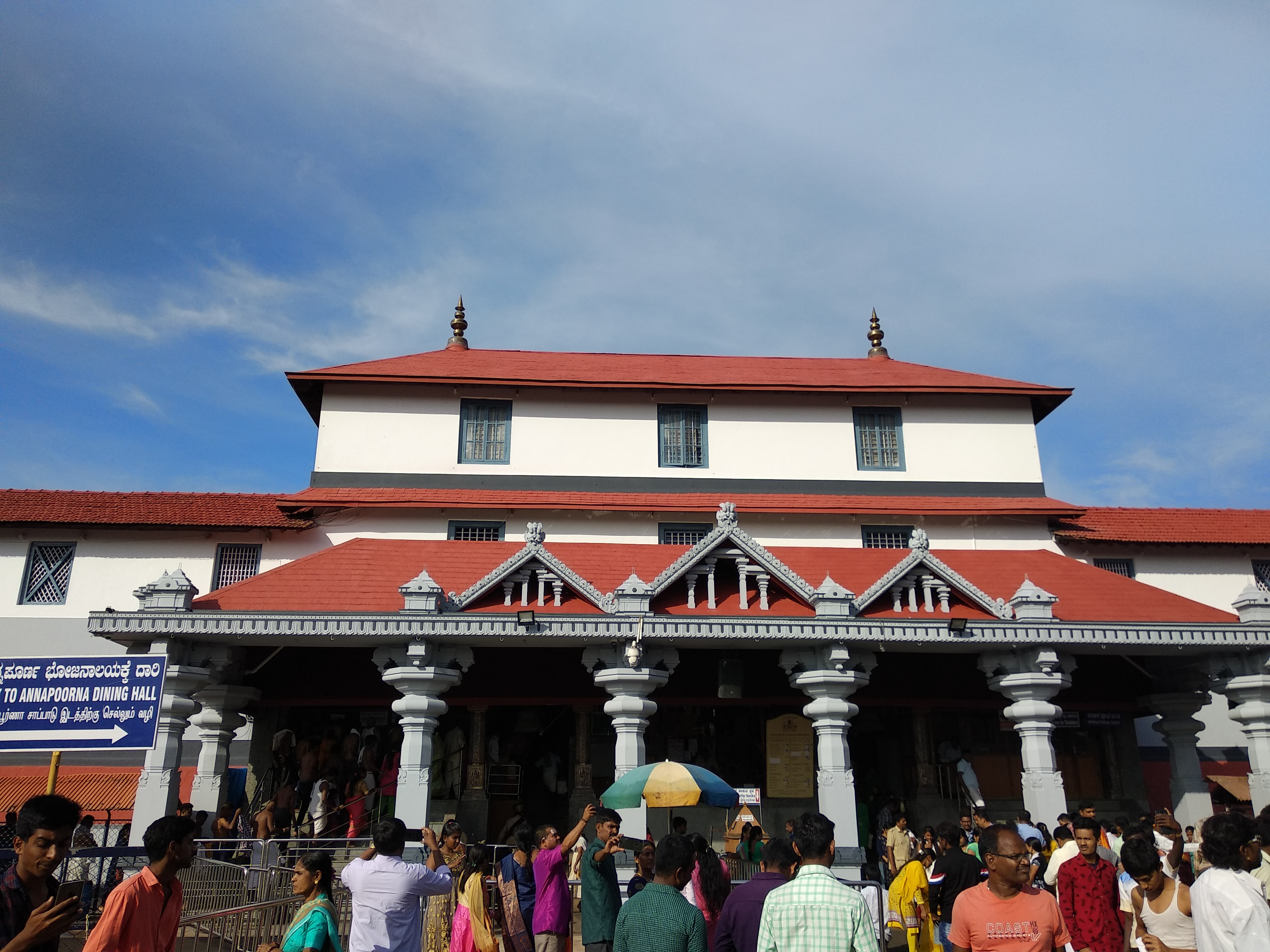
Dharmasthala Temple

In July 2025, an investigation into allegations of murders and mass burials in the Indian temple town of Dharmasthala, Karnataka, was opened. The chief complainant alleged that he was coerced into burying over one hundred bodies of women and minors, many bearing signs of sexual violence, and witnessed poor beggars tied to chairs and suffocated with towels. In another complaint in August 2025, a local activist alleged that he observed a body being buried fifteen years earlier. The temple has long been the subject of protests by local families and political groups, including demonstrations in 2012 following the murder of a teenage girl.

A Special Investigation Team (SIT) was created to probe the allegations. The complainant identified thirteen burial spots at which the SIT began the process of exhuming bodies. As of 4 August 2025, eleven sites have been excavated among the thirteen identified by the complainant. No human remains have been found at nine sites, one of them has yielded a partial skeleton, and a human skull and bones were found at another. On 23 August 2025, the complainant was arrested for perjury for lying on oath and his identity was revealed. However, the SIT said that investigation will continue and would be expanded to vet FIRs filed elsewhere in Karnataka and neighboring states about the "disappearance of pilgrims" visiting the temple town.

== Background ==
Dharmasthala temple has been the subject of protests led by local families and political groups concerning sexual violence, murder victims, and burials since the 1980s, frequently concerning suppression by political figures. Protests occurred again in 2012 following the rape and murder of a 17-year-old girl Soujanya. Her case was investigated by the police, the Criminal Investigation Department of Karnataka, and the Central Bureau of Investigation. Her family alleged that the offender was associated with the temple's leadership. The CBI Special Court found no evidence against the defendant and acquitted them in 2023. The family of the aggrieved asked for another CBI investigation, but the Karnataka High Court rejected the plea. Dharmasthala did not have a police station until 2016.

=== Allegation of mass burial ===
On 22 June 2025, lawyers Ojaswi Gowda and Sachin S Deshpande of Bengaluru released a letter stating that they had a client who was willing to reveal the locations of the bodies of the victims of rape and murder that he had buried himself.

On 3 July 2025, a 48-year-old man who previously worked as a sanitation worker at the Dharmasthala temple, said he had been forced to bury hundreds of bodies between 1995 and 2014, under the threat of death. The man, whose identity has been protected by a court, said he has been in hiding for 12 years.

He said victims, who included a schoolchild and a 20-year-old acid attack victim, were buried along the Netravathi River, and that many female bodies bore signs of strangulation and sexual assault. On 28 July, he identified the 13 burial sites where he claimed he had buried the bodies. The mother of Ananya Bhat, who went missing during a college trip in 2003, said she thought her daughter could be among the victims.

Another witness appeared before a court in August 2025. Jayanth T, a social activist, said he had knowledge of where a teenage girl's body had been buried in 2005. The witness said he was related to another person who had been murdered in Dharmasthala.

=== Gag order ===
On 18 July, Judge Vijaya Kumar Rai B granted a gag order removing over 800 online links related to the Dharmasthala case. The gag order was lifted in early August, with the judge questioning the previous judge's basis for the gag order. Journalists and activists highlighted that the judge had been educated at institutions run by the Dharmasthala temple, and worked as a lawyer at a firm representing the family who own the temple. On 4 August, the judge recused himself from the proceedings.

== Investigation ==
The complaints and resulting pressure from public outrage resulted in a police case against the temple authorities being opened on 4 July. The complainant was granted police protection on 10 July, and on 11 July, he provided the remains of a body he said he had exhumed.

S. Balan, a senior lawyer and human rights activist, led a delegation of lawyers to meet Karnataka Chief Minister Siddaramaiah, after which the case was transferred to a Special Investigation Team (SIT) led by Director General of Police Pronab Mohanty.

=== Excavations ===
Excavation at five locations along the Nethravathi River—conducted in the presence of officials, police personnel, forensic staff, and revenue department staff—found no human remains. Partial skeletal remains were found on 31 July at a sixth excavation site, at a depth of three feet; an initial report suggested they were male. SIT officials said they found fifteen bones, no skull, and that some bones were broken. No remains were found at a seventh and eighth site, where digging was done six feet deep. About 60 persons including 20 labourers, the complainant, and his legal representatives were present. At the ninth and tenth spots identified by the complainant in a forested area, no human remains were found. At an eleventh site near Banglegudde, a human skull and a few bones were found. At the fourteenth site, over 114 bones and a skull were found; preliminary reports suggested that the remains belonged to a human male, who was possibly strangled with a red sari found nearby.

A PAN card and debit card were found at one of the excavated sites. The PAN card was found to belong to a man from Nelamangala in Bengaluru rural district. He had died of jaundice and was cremated in his own village.

Legal experts and activists have criticised the investigation as nontransparent and too small. A court granted an injunction requested by a relative of temple leadership staff, requesting the suppression of over 8,800 items of coverage about the allegations. The police denied media reports suggesting that some officers had requested to be excluded from the investigation.

=== Whistleblower arrest and identity reveal ===
On 23 August 2025, the SIT arrested the chief complainant for perjury and remanded him ten days in SIT custody. The complainant had allegedly produced skull and bones in a meeting before a magistrate claiming that they belonged to a woman but forensic testing revealed that they were that of a male. The identity of the complainant was also subsequently revealed due to the arrest.

== Legal cases ==
The creator of an AI-generated YouTube video was charged with spreading misinformation by the Dakshina Kannada police in July. On 1 August, Karnataka Home Minister G. Parameshwara said the government was monitoring social media posts, and warned users against spreading misinformation.
