= Marody =

Panchayat village in Beltangady taluk

Marody, also written Marodi, is a panchayat village in Belthangady taluk of the Dakshina Kannada district in the state of Karnataka, India. It is located in the foothills of the Western Ghats. There are two villages in the Naravi gram panchayat: Marody and Perady. It is 25 km from Karkala towards Dharmasthala.
