= Veerendra Heggade =

Indian temple administrator (born 1948)

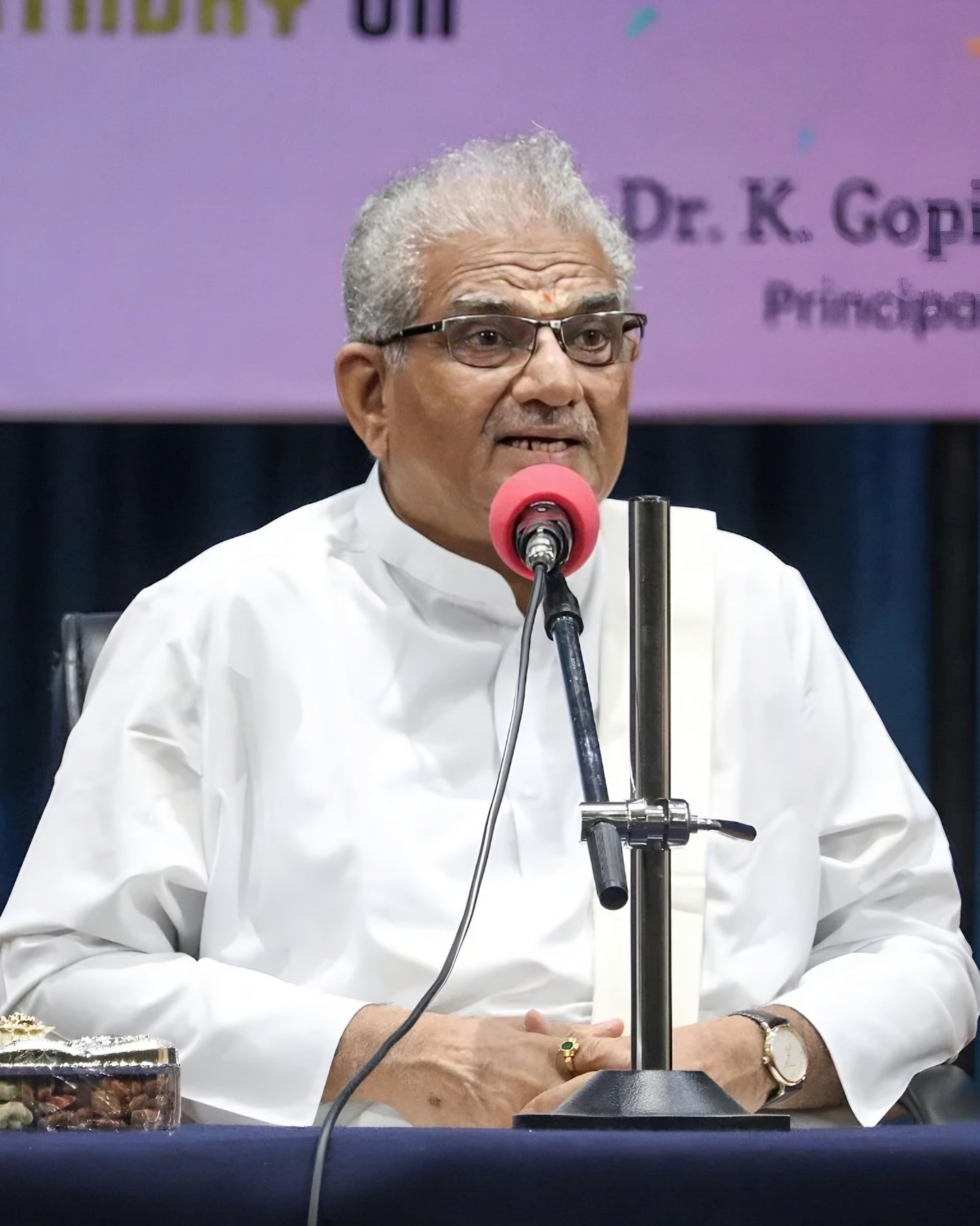
- Heggade at SDM College of Engineering and Technology, Dharwad

Personal life
- Born: 25 November 1948 (age 77) Bantwal, Mysore State, Dominion of India (present–day Karnataka, India)
- Other names: Heggade/Pergade, Kavandaru, Dharmarathna, Dharmabhushana
- Website: www.veerendraheggade.in

Religious life
- Religion: Jainism

Religious career
- Based in: Dharmastala, Karnataka, India
- Post: (Hereditary administrator) of Dharmasthala Temple
- Period in office: 1968 - present
- Predecessor: Ratnavarma Heggade

Member of Parliament, Rajya Sabha (Karnataka)
- Incumbent
- Assumed office 7 July 2022
- Nominated by: Ramnath Kovind
- Constituency: Nominated (Social work)

Veerendra Heggade (born 25 November 1948) is an Indian philanthropist and the hereditary administrator of the Dharmasthala Temple in the Indian state of Karnataka. He succeeded to the post at the age of 19, on 24 October 1968, the 21st in his line. He administers the temple and its properties, which are held in trust. He is a nominated Member of Parliament in the Rajya Sabha since July 2022.

He was awarded the Karnataka Ratna award for the year 2009, the highest civilian award in Karnataka.

His tenure at Dharmasthala has been marked by controversies regarding allegations of sexual abuse, murder and cover-ups of various persons around the temple region. The allegations pending investigation implicate temple authorities, family members and Heggade personally to different capacities.

== Personal life ==
Heggade is the eldest son of Dharmadhikari Ratnavarma Heggade and Rathnamma Heggade (née Shetty). He belongs to the Pergade dynasty of Tulu Jain Bunt lineage, the hereditary trustees of the Sri Dharmasthala Manjunatha Swamy temple in Dakshina Kannada or southern district of Karnataka. The family are trustees of a Hindu temple, although the family belong to the Jain community.

== Work ==
He runs the Annapoorna kitchen at Dharmasthala, which is one of the largest and oldest family-run kitchens in India. The kitchen feeds around 50,000 persons every day. It was featured on the National Geographic TV show, "Mega Kitchens".

He is the President of SDM Educational Society, Ujire, which manages educational institutions from primary to engineering, medical, ayurvedic and management institutes as well as hospitals.

== Awards and honours ==
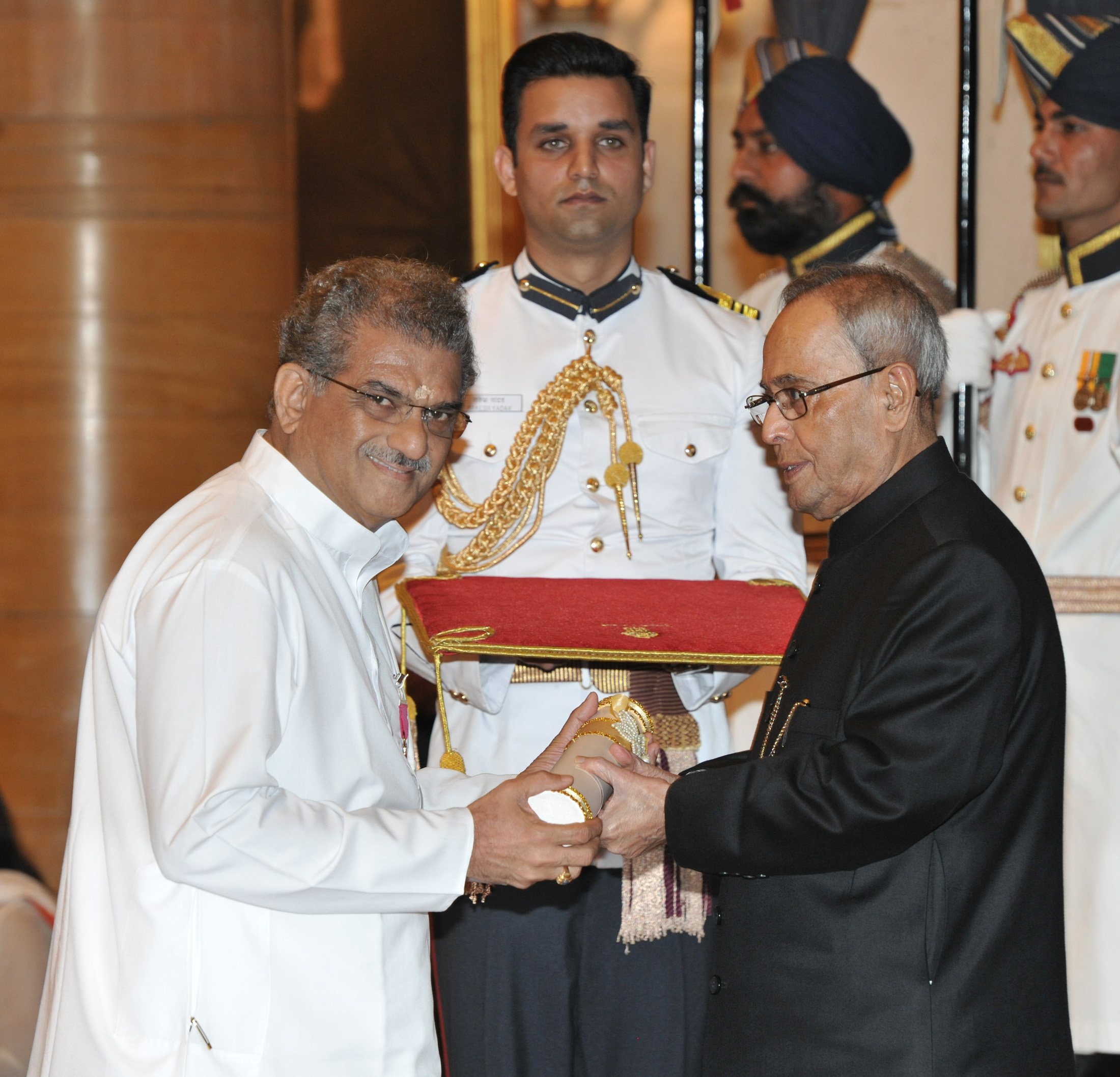
Indian president Mukherjee gives Heggade the Padma Vibhushan Award, 2015

- Padma Bhushan Award (2000) for social work and Communal Harmony (India's third-highest civilian award)
- Rajarshi title from President of India, Dr. Shankar Dayal Sharma, in 1993
- The State Government selected Heggade for Karnataka Ratna title for 2009.
- P. V. Narasimha Rao, former Prime Minister of India presented Federation of Indian Chambers of Commerce and Industry award for Rural Development activities in Belthangady Taluk by Shri Kshethra Dharmasthala Rural Development Project (SKDRDP) on 12 May 1995.
- Atal Bihari Vajpayee, former Prime Minister of India presented Federation of Indian Chambers of Commerce and Industry award for Rural Development & Self Employment activities by RUDSET Institute on 20 November 1999.
- "Vatika Varshada Kannadiga – 2004" by ETV Kannada at Hassan on 20 November 2004
- Padma Vibhushan (2015) by the Government of India for social work
- Sri Bhagavan Mahaveera Peace Award by Government of Karnataka

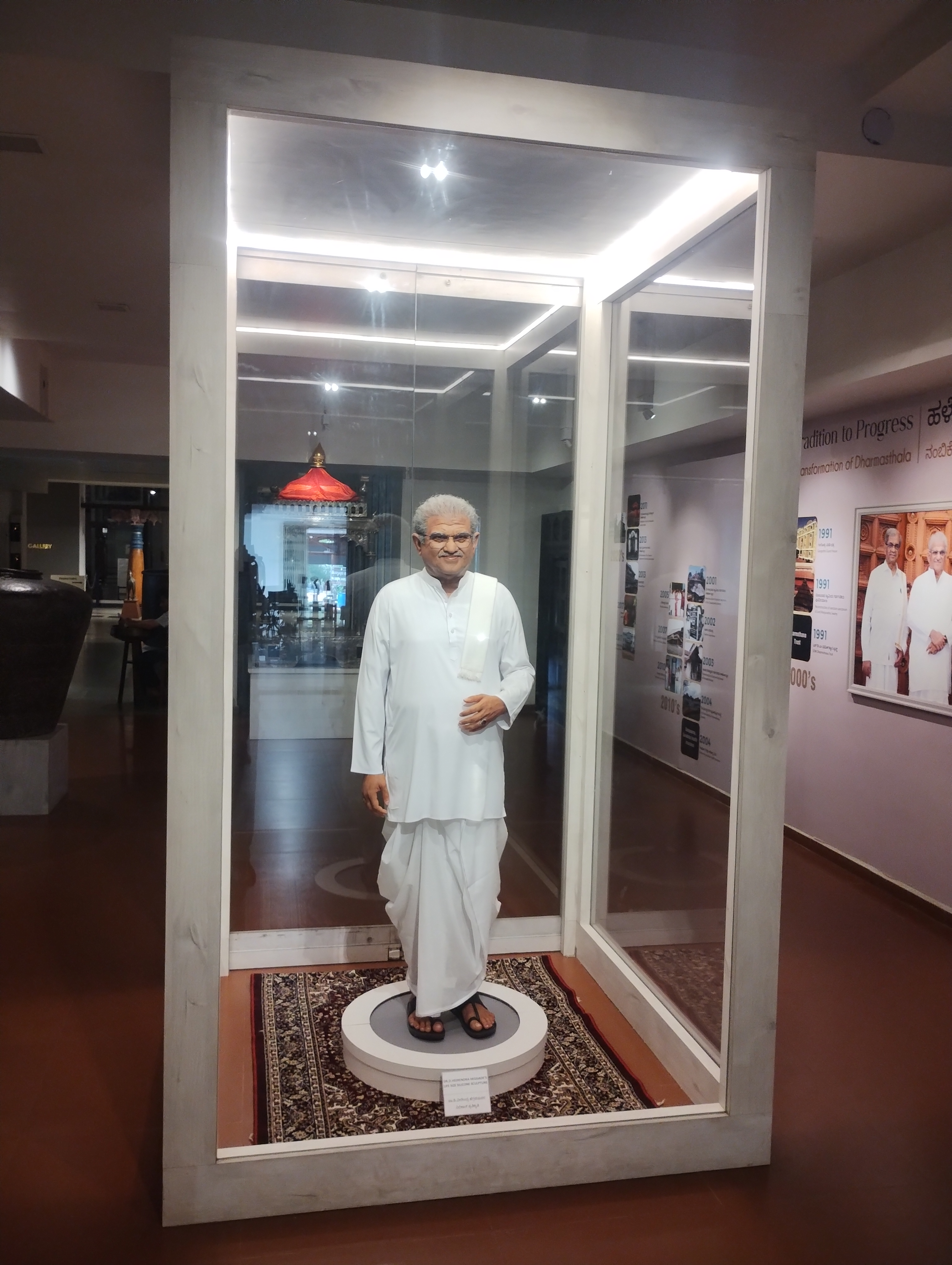
Sculpture of Veerendra Heggade at Manjusha Museum, Dharmasthala (2025)

== Conspiracies ==
=== Sowjanya murder case ===
Sowjanya, a 17-year-old student, was raped and murdered in Dharmasthala in 2012, and the case remains unresolved, with the accused acquitted in 2023 due to lack of evidence. Activists and the victim's family accuse influential figures, possibly connected to Heggade, of shielding the real culprits. Additionally, reports highlight around 462 unnatural deaths in Dharmasthala over 10 years (up to 2013), suggesting a pattern of systemic issues.

In response, Heggade has stated that the name of Dharmasthala is being tarnished by those opposing its progress and has emphasized his commitment to serving the community despite facing criticism.

=== Dharmasthala mass burial ===
In July 2025, a former sanitation worker employed by the Dharmasthala temple administration between 1995 and 2014 alleged that he was coerced by influential figures to burn and bury the bodies of hundreds of rape and murder victims at various sites around Dharmasthala. The police registered a case under section 211(a) of the Bharatiya Nyaya Sanhita and are seeking court permission to exhume the alleged burial sites to verify his claims.

On 19 July 2025, the Karnataka government constituted a Special Investigation Team (SIT), headed by DGP Pronab Mohanty, to probe the former sanitation worker's allegations of secret mass burials at Dharmasthala.

In August 2025, the SIT arrested the same sanitation worker on charges including perjury and furnishing false evidence, a Belthangady court remanded him to 10 days' police custody while the probe continues.

Around the same time, Veerendra Heggade describing the allegations as "baseless" and "morally wrong," said he was "deeply hurt," and stated that Dharmasthala would cooperate fully with a fair, transparent SIT investigation. The Temple authorities likewise issued a statement welcoming such a probe.
