= Ammavaru =

Hindu goddess

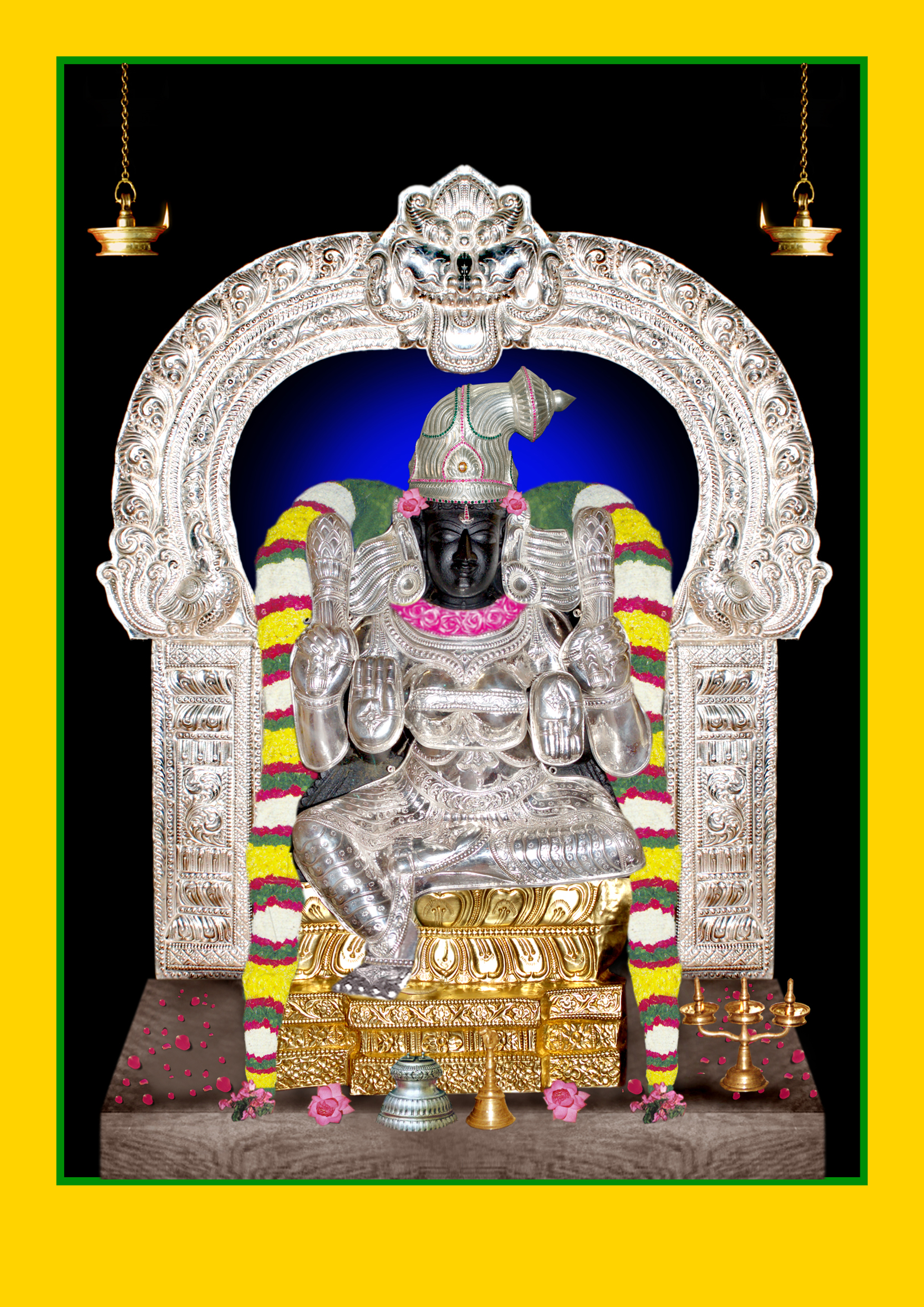
Ammavaru

Ammavaru (Kannada: ಅಮ್ಮನವರು) (Telugu: అమ్మావరు), according to Hindu belief, is an ancient goddess who laid the egg that hatched Brahma, Shiva and Vishnu. "Amma" means mother. She is thought to have existed before the beginning of time.

A notable worship site for Ammavaru is Dharmasthala Temple, located in Dharmasthala in Dakshina Kannada, Karnataka, India, where she is revered alongside a form of Shiva and the Jain tirthankara, Chandraprabha.

Annually, the women of South India who believe in Ammavaru conduct a ritual prayer to the deity. A metal pot filled with rice is used to symbolize the goddess' body. The pot is clothed in a traditional sari. At the mouth of the pot, a painted coconut is used to symbolize the head. Varying implements are used to fashion the eyes, ears, and nose of the Goddess.

== See also ==
- Prakriti
- Shakti
- Tridevi
- Purusha
- Brahman
