= Manjusha Museum =

Manjusha Museum, Dharmasthala
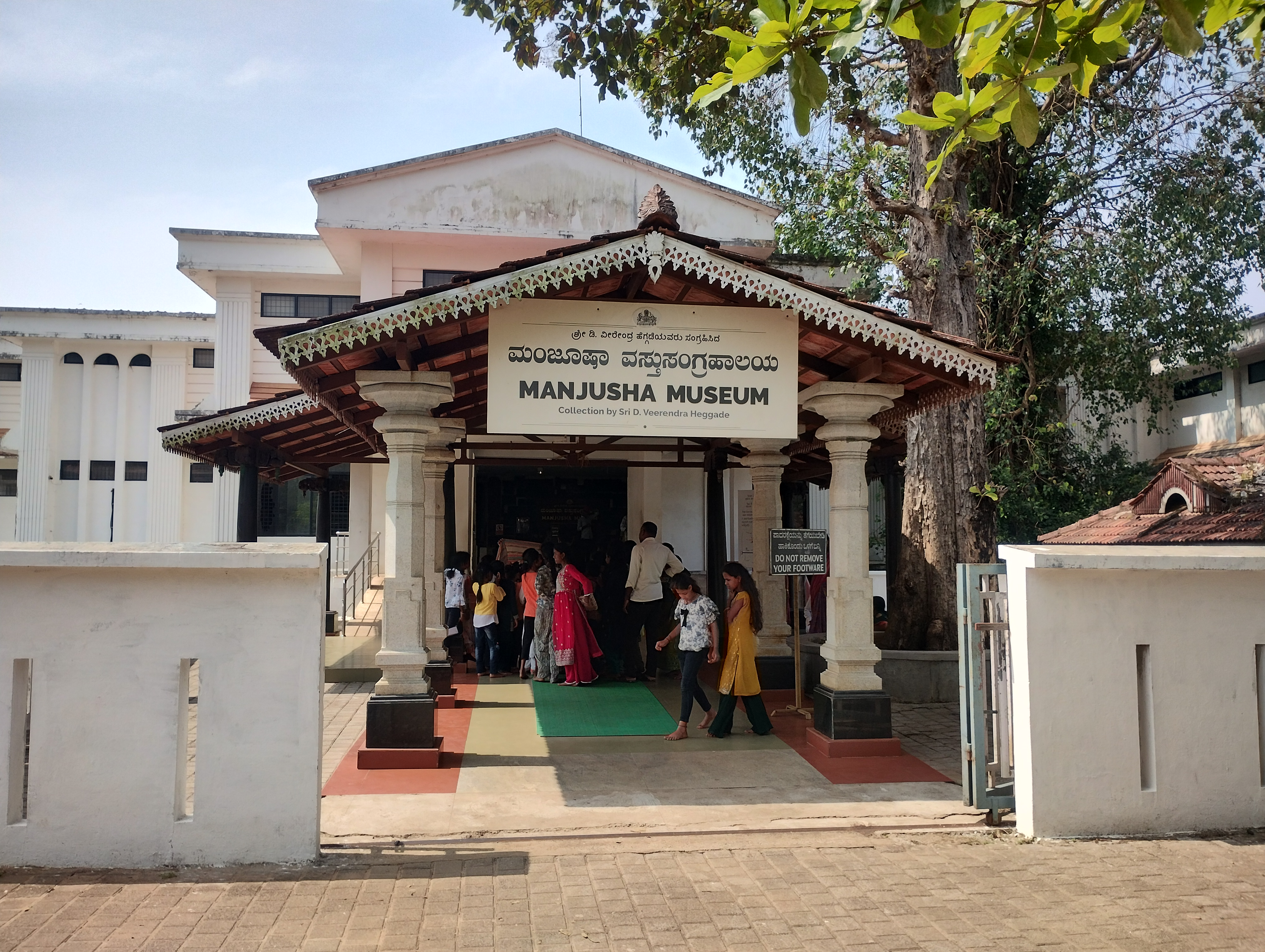
- Manjusha Museum in 2025
- Established: 1989
- Coordinates: 12.9511°N 75.3824°E
- Type: Private museum
- Collection size: 8000 artifacts
- Founder: Veerendra Heggade
- Curator: Ritesh Sharma

Manjusha Museum is in the town of Dharmasthala in Karnataka state, India. It houses antiques, paintings, artifacts, temple chariots, and vintage cars collected from temples across Karnataka. The museum is south of the Dharmasthala Temple. It was founded by Veerendra Heggade.

== Collection ==
The museum has terracotta coins from the Mauryan period around the 1st century BC, a book of the accounts of the Manjunatha Swamy temple and a veena played by the musician Veene Sheshanna. It also has Indian stone and metal sculpture, paintings, jewelry, objects of worship and utilitarian objects created by the craftsmen of the coastal area, and a collection of 6000 palm leaf manuscripts.

== Media gallery ==
Manjusha museum in 2025
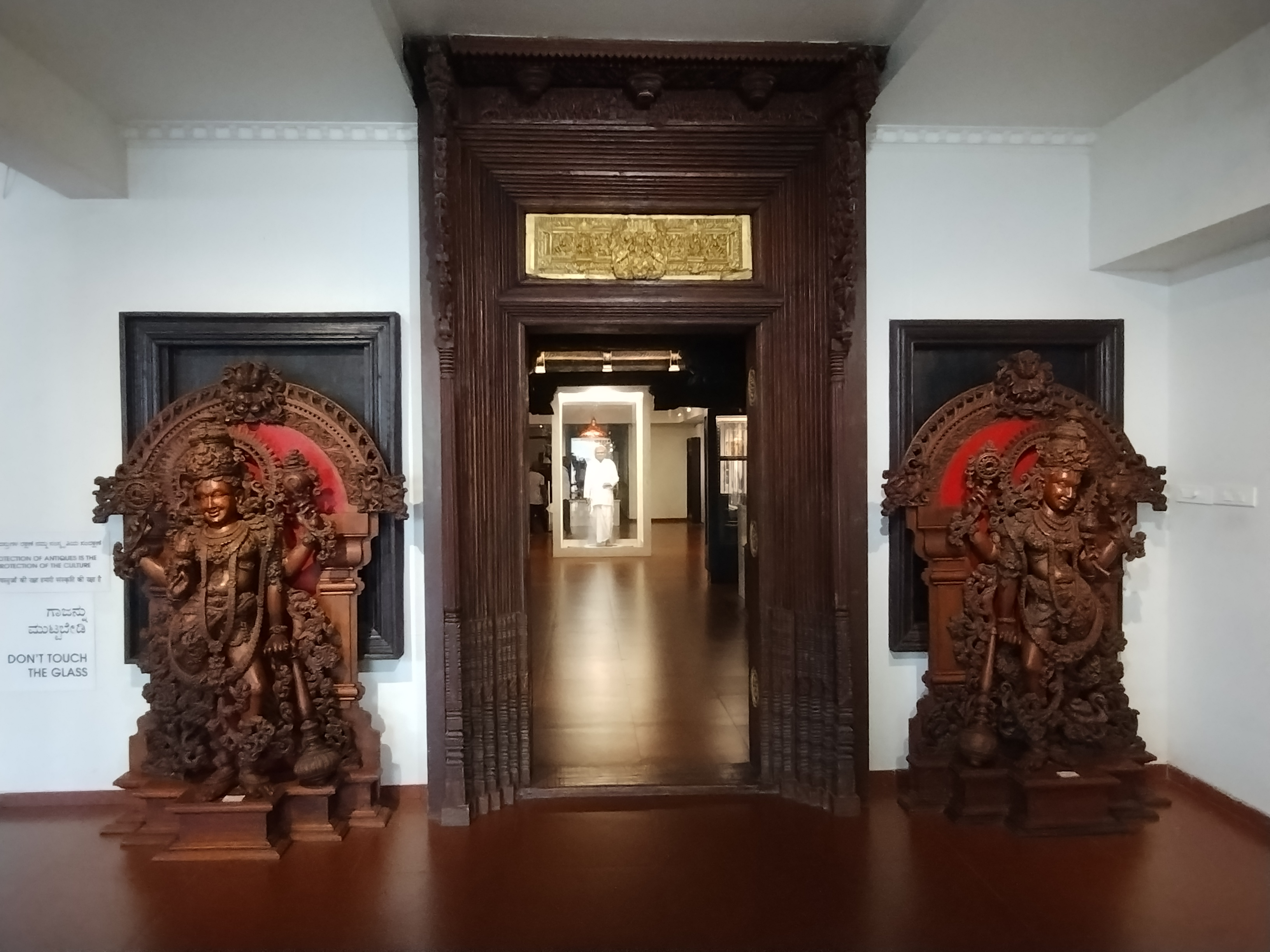

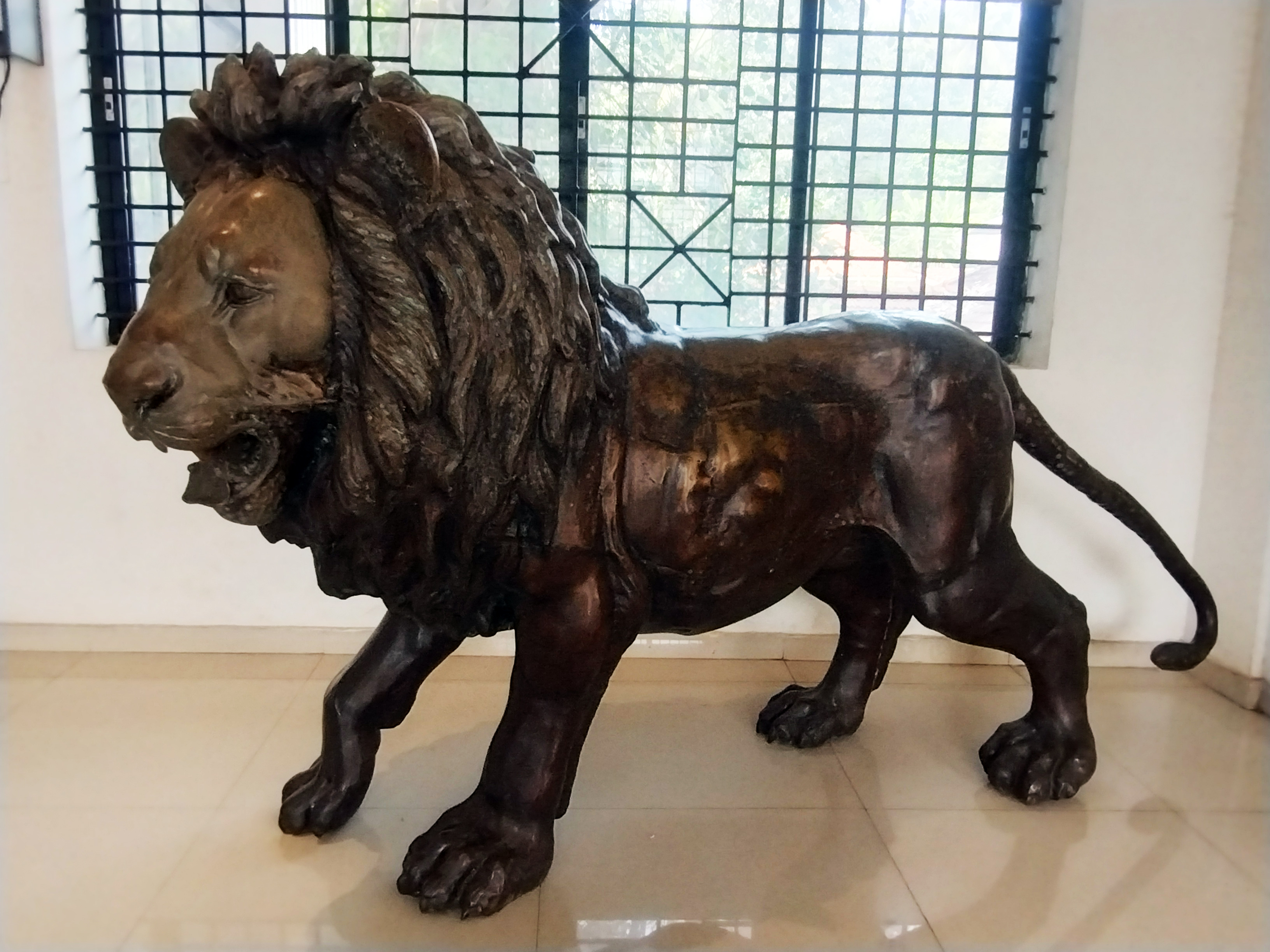

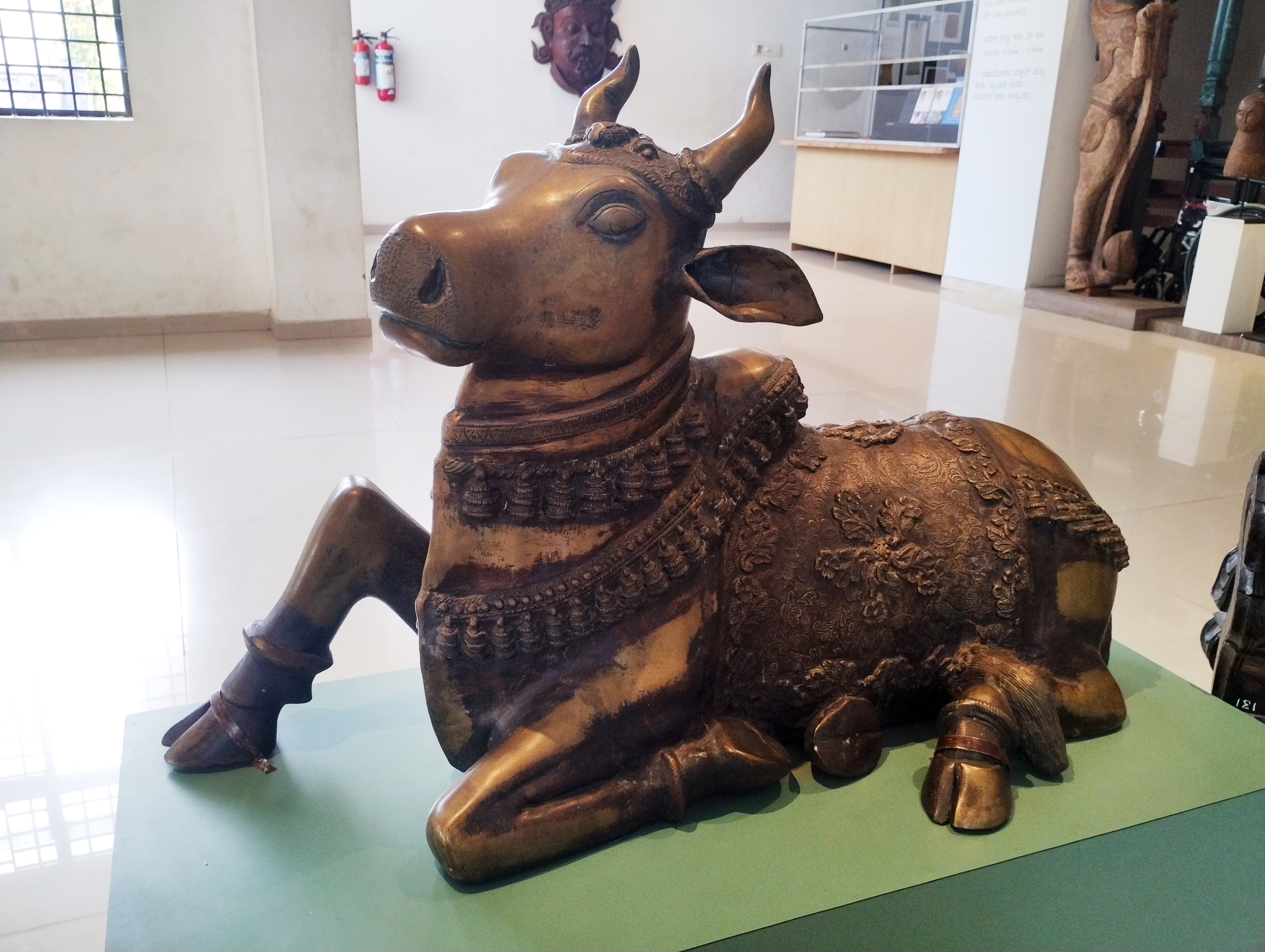

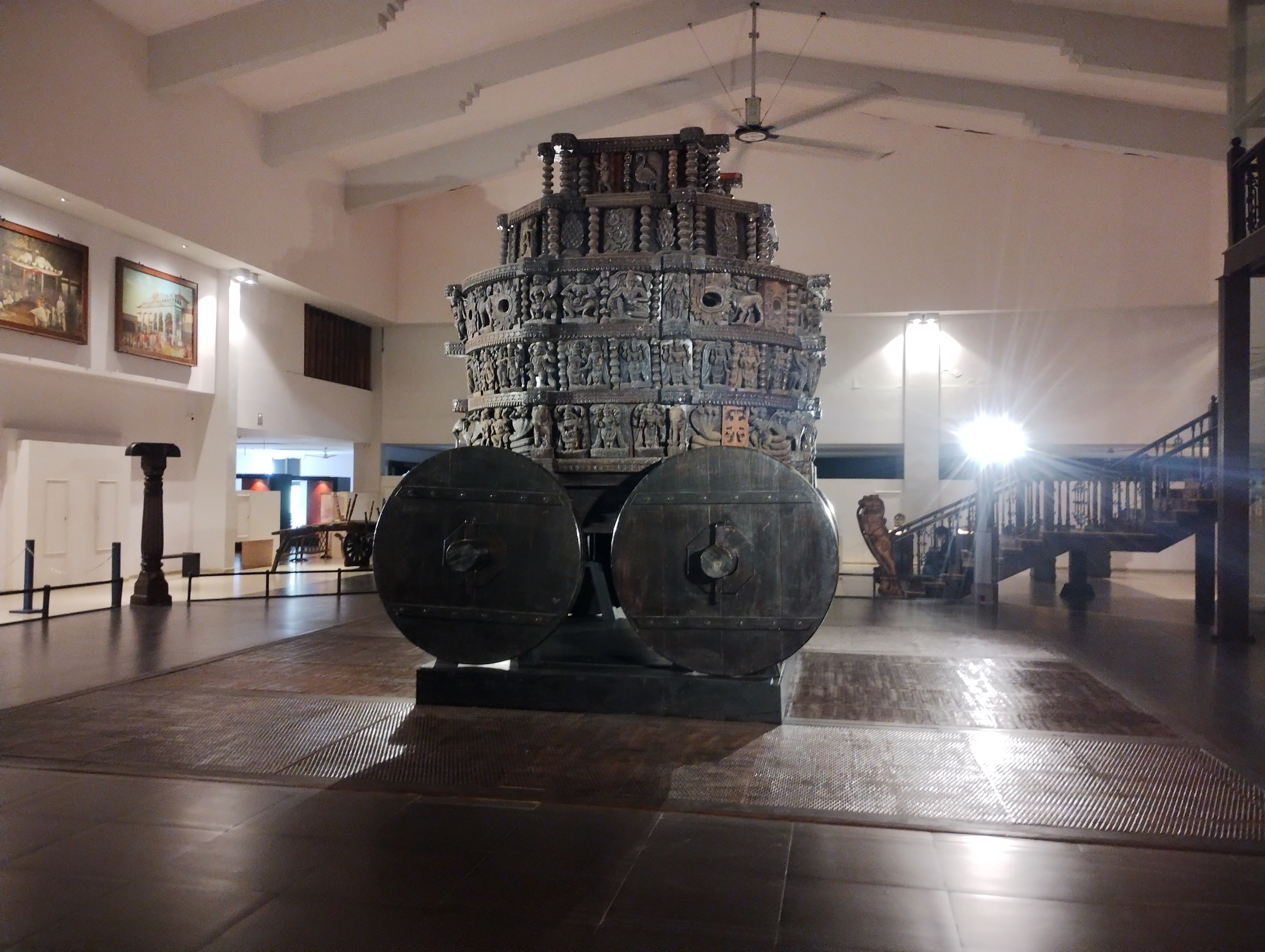

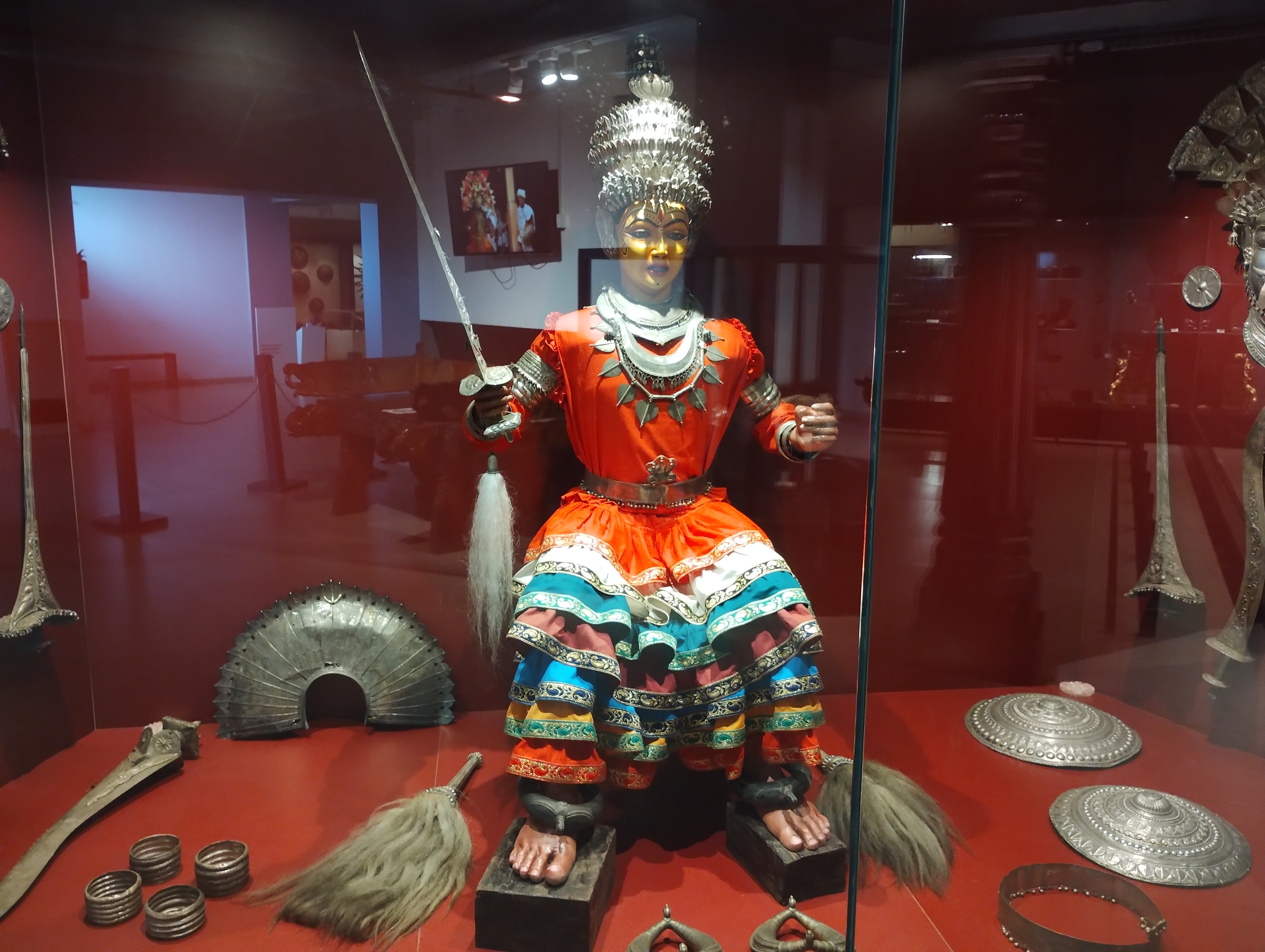
Manjusha car museum in 2025
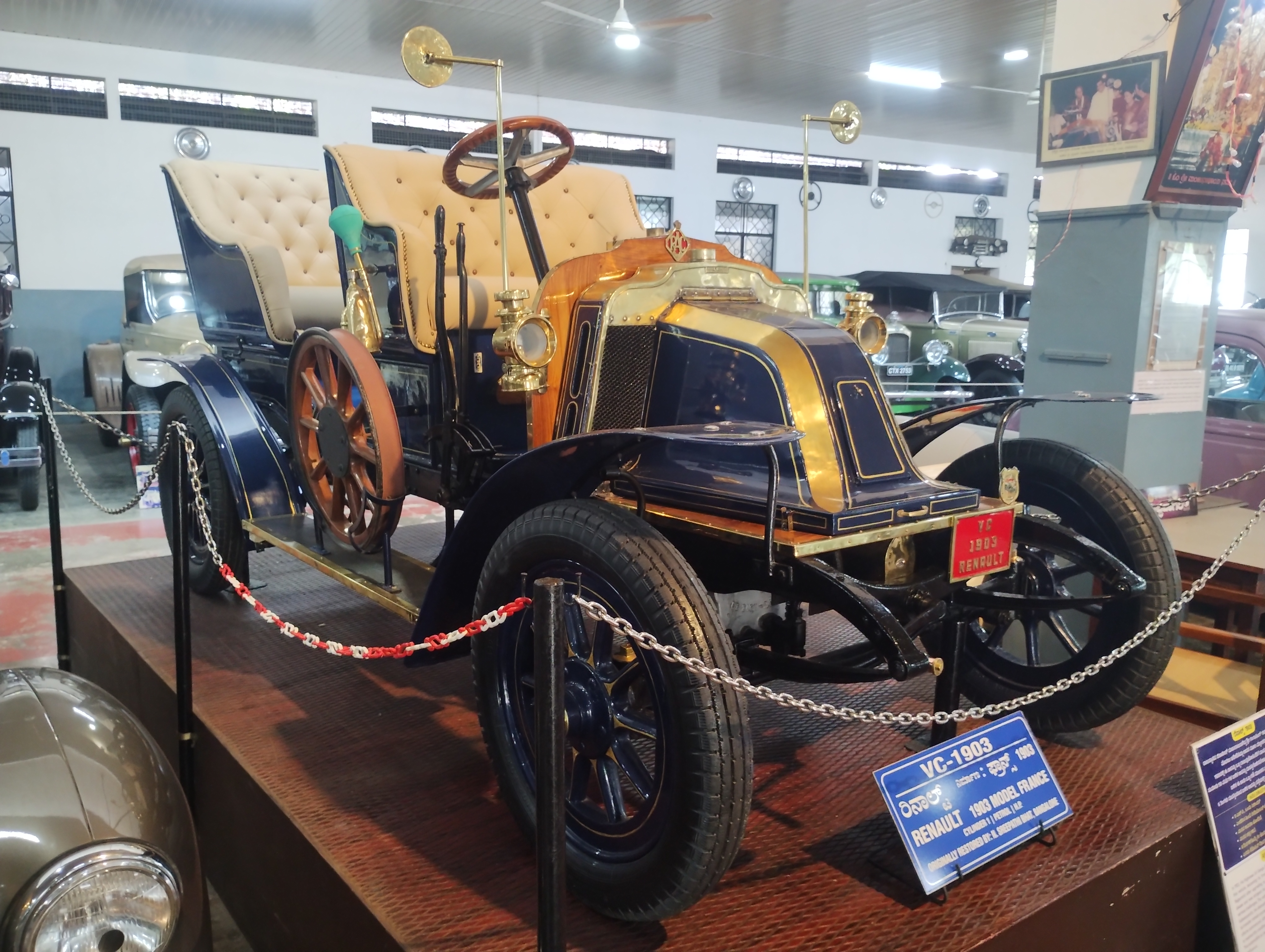

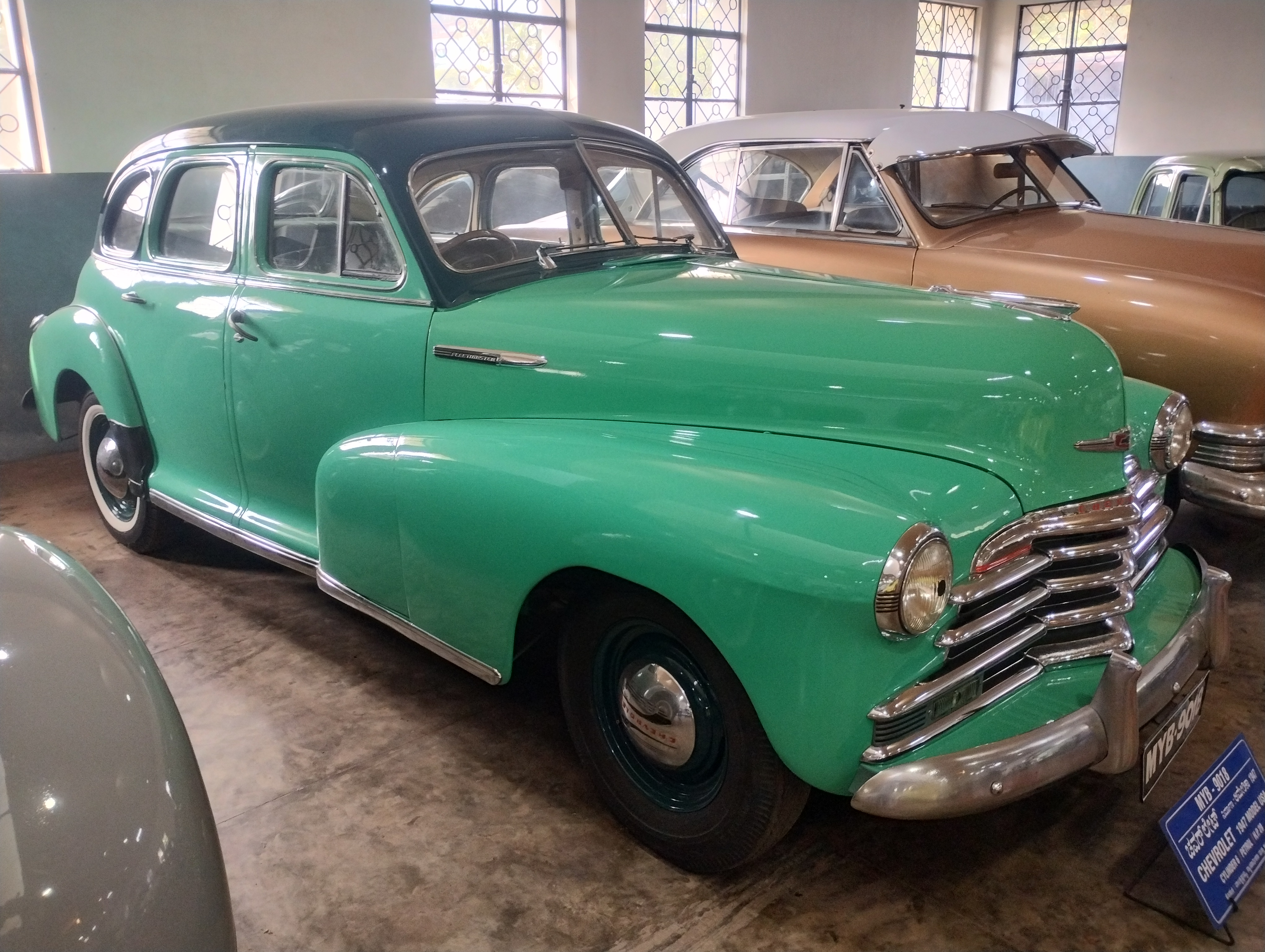

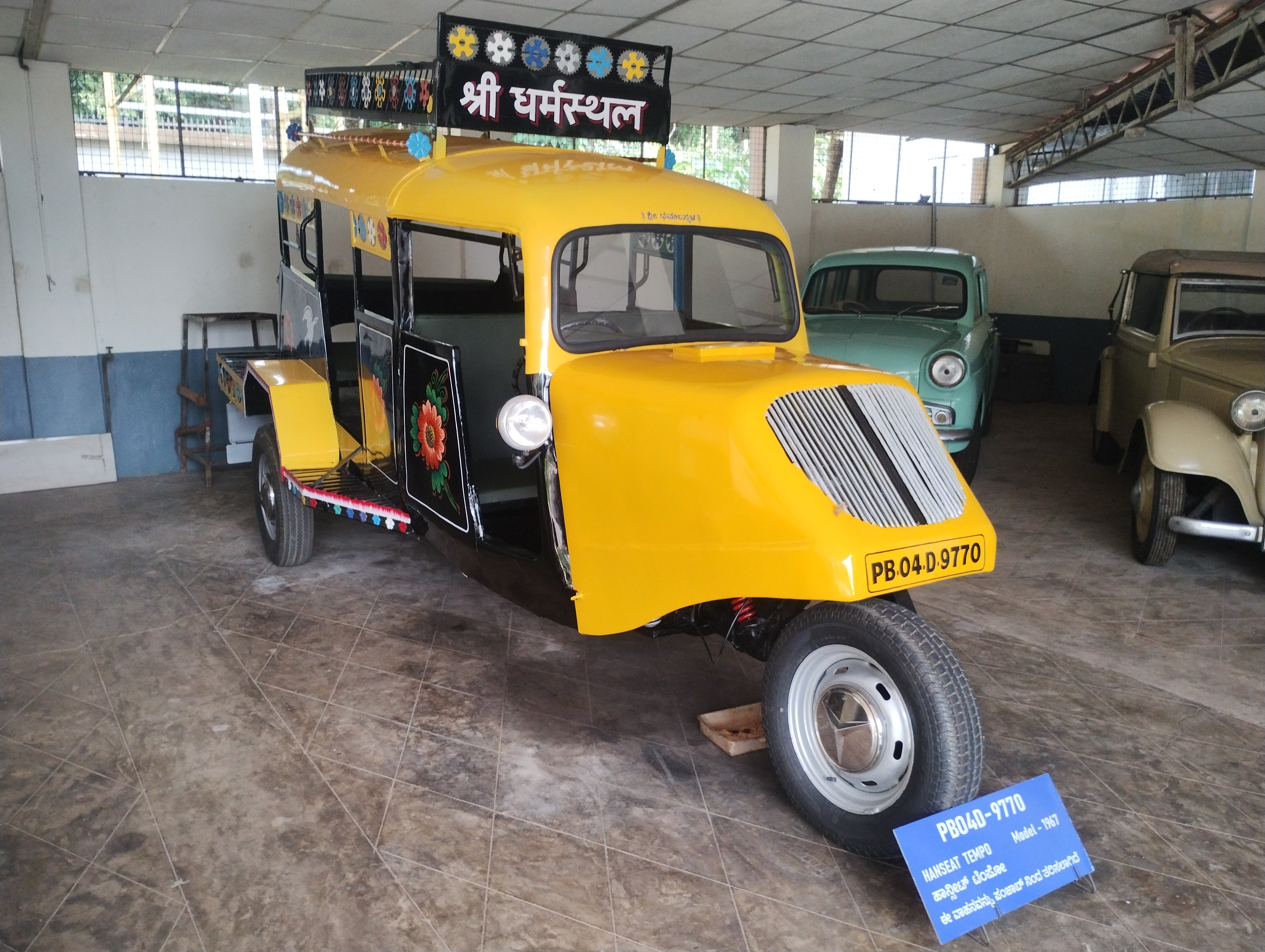

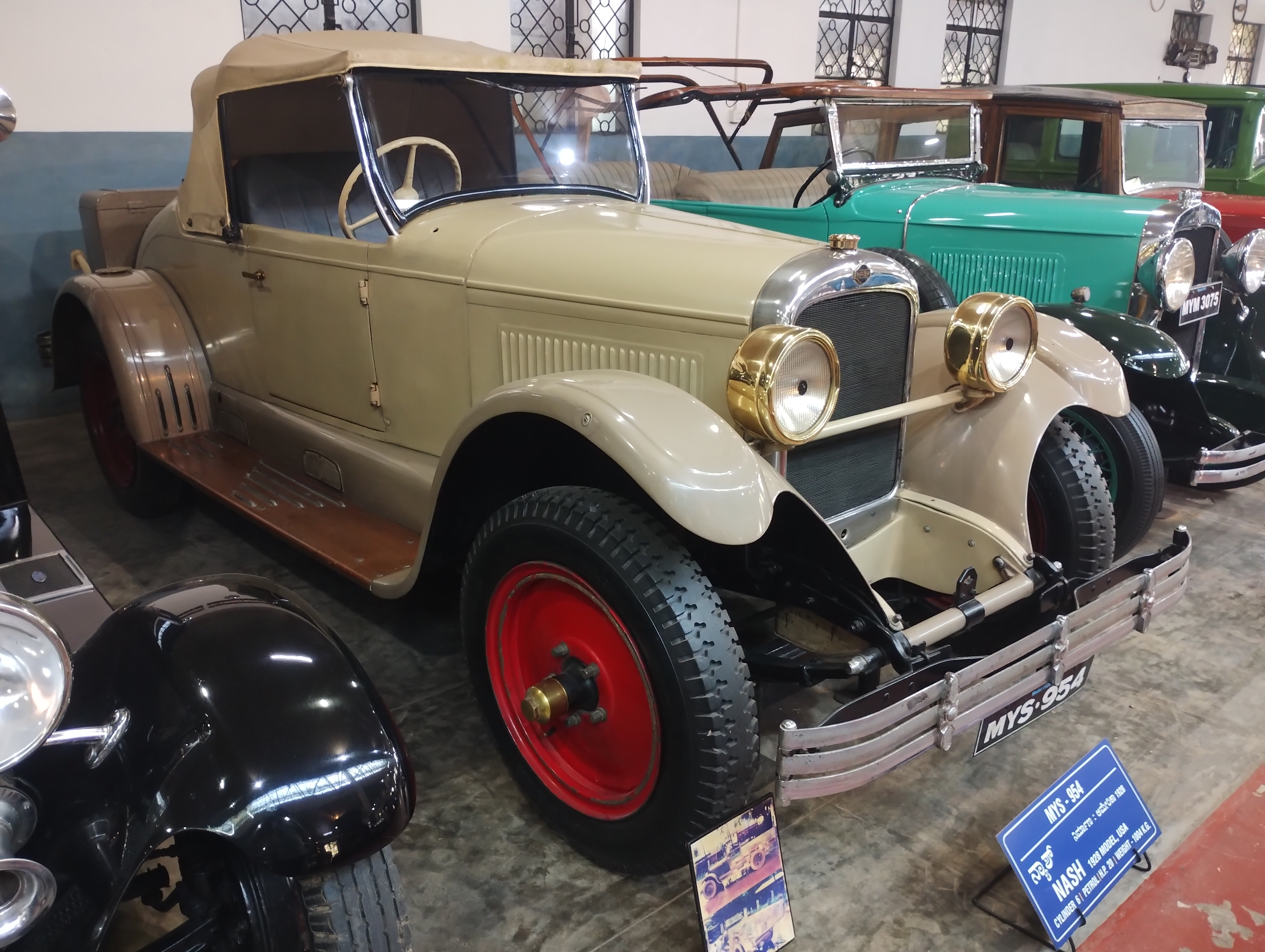

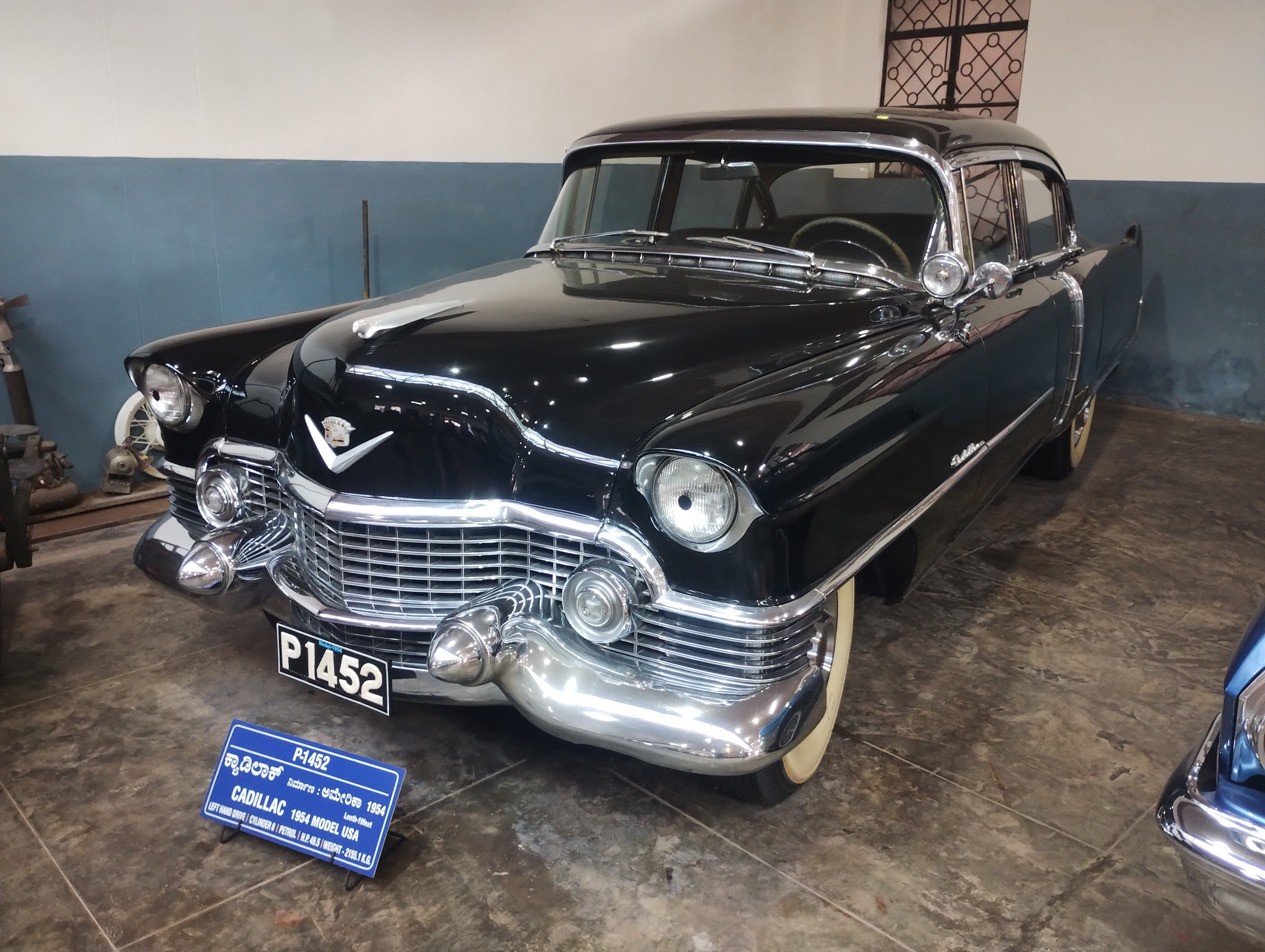

== See also ==
- Payana Museum, an automotive vintage car museum owned by D. Veerendra Heggade, in Mandya district, Karnataka
