= Ratnavarma Heggade =

Indian philanthropist and temple administrator

Dharmasthala Ratnavarma Heggade
- Title: Heggade/Hegde

Personal life
- Born: South Canara, Madras Presidency, British India (now in Dakshina Kannada, Karnataka, India)

Religious life
- Religion: Jain

Senior posting
- Based in: Dharmastala, Karnataka, India
- Post: Dharma Adhikari of Dharmasthala Manjunatha Temple
- Period in office: 1955–1968
- Predecessor: Manjayya Heggade
- Successor: Veerendra Heggade

Dharmasthala Ratnavarma Heggade was an Indian philanthropist, educationist and legislator who is best known for being the hereditary administrator (Dharmadhikari) of the Dharmasthala Manjunatha Temple from 1955 to 1968.

== Early life ==
Born in a family called the ‘'Pergade'’. The Pergades were the feudal lords of the temple town of Dharmasthala. Ratnavarma completed his early education in Mangalore. He married Ratnamma Heggade (née Shetty), the daughter of a wealthy landlord Sankappa Shetty of Mudabidri. The couple were parents to five children, four sons (Veerendra, Surendra, Harshendra, Rajendra) and a daughter (Padmalata).

== Career ==
Ratnavarma Heggade's public life began when he succeeded to the post of Dharma Adhikari after his uncle Manjayya Heggade died in 1955. He transformed the village of Dharmasthala to a modern township, developing the land and buildings. He also established an education trust, to establish educational institutions during this period and served as legislator in the Karnataka Legislative Assembly from 1957 and 1962. Heggade also initiated plans to erect a statue of Bahubali similar to ones at Venur, Karkala and Shravanabelagola. His son Veerendra Heggade took over the project and completed the Bahubali statue project after his untimely death in 1968.

== Legacy ==
The Ratnavarma Heggade Tulu Drama Award is named after Ratnavarma. The prize is awarded each year during a play-writing competition sponsored by Tulukoota, a Tulu language monthly magazine. A Stadium in Ujire, India is also named after him.
