= Sarva Dharma Sammelan =

Sarva Dharma Sammelan ("Meeting of all faiths") is an assembly organized in several places in India, generally by the Jain community,

The best known meeting is held at Dharmasthala every year.

The philosopher Osho started his public speaking at the annual Sarva Dharma Sammelan held at Jabalpur since 1939, organized by the Taran Panthi Jain community, in which he was born. He participated from 1951 to 1968.

A Sarva Dharma Sammelan serves to support the view that all religions can coexist in harmony.

== See also ==
- Parliament of the World's Religions
- Anekantavada
