= Soujanya rape and murder case =

Rape And Murder

The Soujanya case is an Indian criminal case involving the 2012 rape and murder of a 17-year-old college student. On 9 October 2012, she went missing near the Netravati River bathing ghat in Dharmasthala after stepping off a local bus at 4:00 PM while returning home from Ujire.

== Case history ==
On October 9, 2012, 17-year-old Soujanya, a second-year Pre-University (PU) student at Sri Dharmasthala Manjunatheshwara College in Ujire, went missing. Reports from the time note she stepped off a local bus around 4:00 PM near the Netravati River bathing ghat in Dharmasthala.

Sowjanya attended her morning classes at SDM College as routine. At approximately 4:15 PM, she alighted from a local commuter bus at the Netravati River bathing ghat in Dharmasthala. The stop was just a few kilometres away from her home in Pangala village. When she failed to arrive home by 5:00 PM, her parents grew alarmed and initiated a desperate search with local residents. A missing person report was officially registered at the Belthangady Police Station later that evening. The following morning, search parties discovered Sowjanya's brutalised, lifeless body in a densely wooded area of Mannasanka Forest near Dharmasthala. Forensic observation revealed evidence of severe physical trauma, sexual assault, and violent strangulation. Her hands were found bound to a tree trunk using her own uniform shawl. Following this discovery, sections 376 (Rape) and 302 (Murder) of the Indian Penal Code (IPC) were appended to the active police investigation.

== Investigations and Trial ==
Within 24 hours of the victim's body being recovered, the local Belthangady police arrested a poor, mentally unstable man named Santhosh Rao and framed him as the lone attacker, but public distrust in that investigation forced the state government to escalate the case from the local police to the State CID and finally to the Central Bureau of Investigation. in late 2013, whose 2014 chargesheet simply mirrored the original police narrative by naming Santhosh Rao as the sole accused while exonerating the three wealthy, well-connected local suspects that the victim's family had consistently accused of the gang rape; and on June 16, 2023, after 11 years of heavily contested trials, the Special CBI Court in Bengaluru fully honorably acquitted Santhosh Rao, ruling that the prosecution's case lacked baseline forensic consistency and proof beyond a reasonable doubt, effectively concluding that an innocent man had been wrongfully incarcerated for over a decade while the true killers remained free.

== Alternative Narrative / Allegations ==
The family and protesters alleged that Soujanya's crime was committed by three to four youths from an influential local family—variously identified as Uday Jain, Mallik Jain, Ashrith/Dheeraj Jain, who are linked to the Dharmasthala temple trust, Annapoorna Trust, and D. Veerendra Heggade ( Padma Bhushan Award (2000) for social work and Communal Harmony (India's third-highest civilian award)—with activists such as Mahesh Thimarodi and former police officer Girish Mattananava naming them publicly; they further alleged a series of cover-up tactics, including a police constable cutting a page with two phone numbers from the victim's book that later surfaced near the body (suggesting evidence planting), the family secretly marking an undergarment before handing it to police only for the same garment to be presented as "recovered from the scene," and mud allegedly being inserted into the victim to destroy DNA while a vaginal swab was sent to the FSL only after about ten days—breaching the 72-hour protocol and causing fungal growth that left the DNA inconclusive. The case was also marked by the suspicious death of eyewitness Ravi Poojari, a security guard who saw Soujanya alight the bus and was ruled to have died by suicide, and notably the CBI itself later petitioned to add Uday Jain, Mallik Jain, and Ashrith Jain as accused and seek further investigation, though both petitions were ultimately quashed by the court.

== Reinvestigation ==
Soujanya's mother, Kusumavathi, appealed to the Supreme Court against the High Court's order. On 23 March 2026 the Supreme Court issued notice to the CBI and the Karnataka government. On 29 April 2026 it directed the state to protect eight potential witnesses identified by the family, and the state located them within three weeks. At a hearing in July 2026 the bench of Justices Sanjay Kumar and Sanjiv Sachdeva criticised the CBI investigation, observing that the investigating officer had relied on earlier material instead of collecting evidence independently.

On 21 September 2026 the Supreme Court set aside the High Court's order and directed a de novo investigation by a new SIT headed by a senior state police officer, to be completed within three months. Officers who had been part of the earlier investigations by the Belthangady police, the CID or the CBI were barred from the team. The court observed that the investigation had been conducted "in a manner that causes injustice to the victim". It also noted the testimony of a forensic official that hairs belonging to persons other than Rao had been found on Soujanya's clothing, and that blood samples of any identified suspects could still be compared with the DNA material. Because Rao had already been tried and acquitted, the court held that he could not be investigated or prosecuted again in the case.

On 24 September 2026 the Karnataka government constituted a five-member SIT headed by Inspector General of Police N. Sashikumar.

Following the Supreme Court's verdict ordering a fresh reinvestigation into the 2012 Sowjanya case, the management and authorities of Sri Kshetra Dharmasthala responded publicly, stating that they have welcomed the Supreme Court's decision and are accepting the order with an open mind in an official press release.
