= K. Vasantha Bangera =

Indian politician (1946–2024)

Member of the Karnataka Legislative Assembly
- In office 2013–2018

Member of the Karnataka Legislative Assembly
- In office 2008–2013

Member of the Karnataka Legislative Assembly
- In office 1994–1999 – 1983–1985 1985–1989

Personal details
- Born: 15 January 1946 Belthangady, Madras Province, British India
- Died: 8 May 2024 (aged 78) Bengaluru, Karnataka, India
- Party: Indian National Congress
- Occupation: Politician

K. Vasantha Bangera (15 January 1946 – 8 May 2024) was an Indian politician from the state of Karnataka. Bangera was a five term member of the Karnataka Legislative Assembly and represented the Belthangady constituency.

Bangera was a member of BJP, Janata Dal and Congress. He was later a member of the Indian National Congress.

K. Vasantha Bangera has been appointed as Chairman for Karnataka Small Scale Industrial Development Corporation in 2016.

Bangera died on 8 May 2024, at the age of 78.
