= Dharmasthala Temple =

Hindu Temple in India

Manjunatheshwara Swamy Temple, Dharmasthala
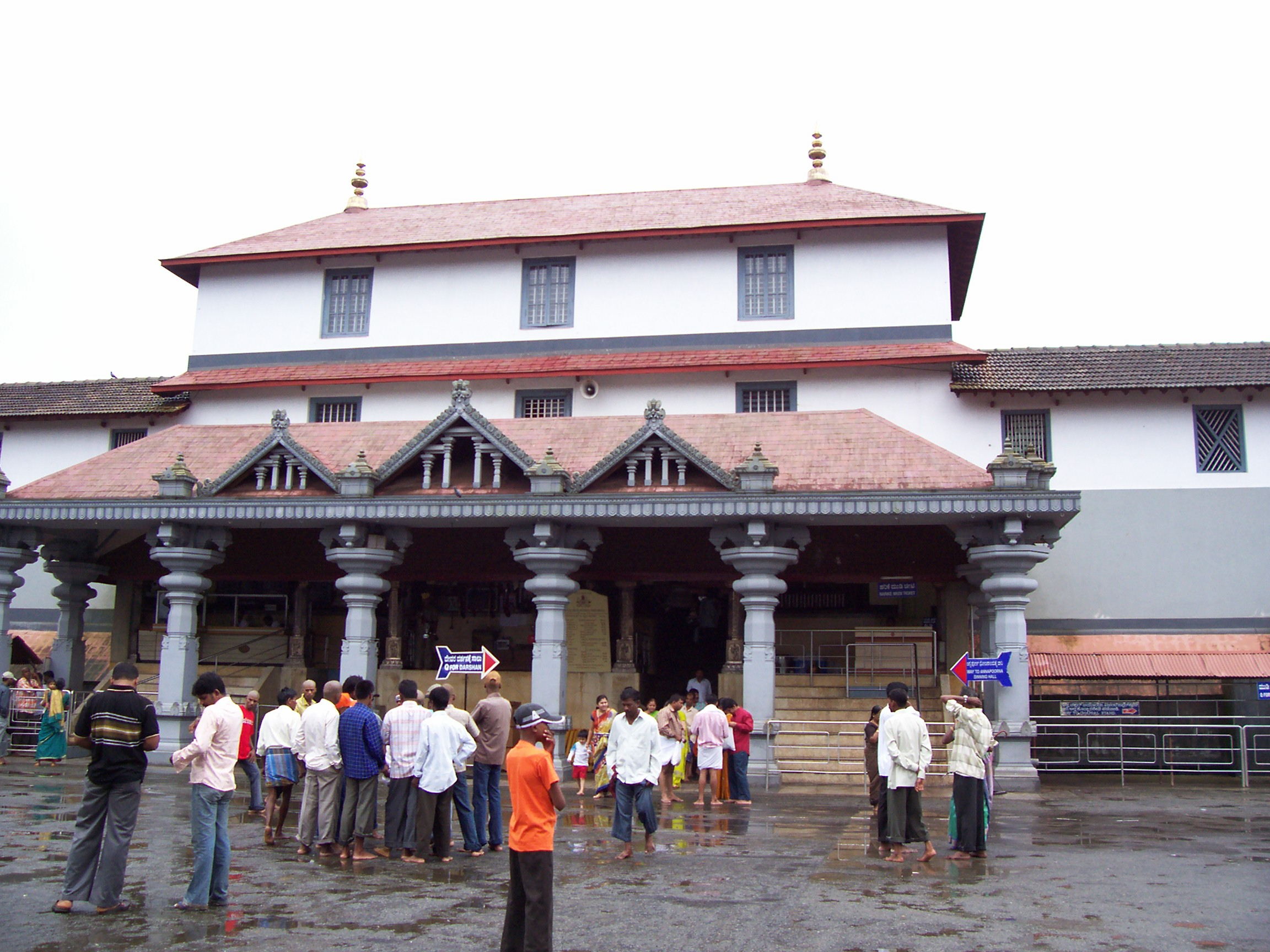
- The entrance of Dharmasthala Manjunatha Temple

- Location in Karnataka

Religion
- Affiliation: Hinduism
- District: Dakshina Kannada
- Deity: Manjunatha (Shiva)
- Festivals: Maha Shivaratri, Mahamastakabhisheka, Laksha Deepa Utsava
- Governing body: Veerendra Heggade
- Leadership: Veerendra Heggade

Location
- Location: Dharmasthala
- State: Karnataka
- Country: India
- Administration: Jain Currently – Veerendra Heggade
- Coordinates: 12.96012°N 75.37836°E

Architecture
- Creator: Birmanna Pergade
- Completed: 1200 C.E.

Website
- www.shridharmasthala.org

Dharmasthala Temple (Shri Kṣētra Dharmasthala) is an 800-year-old Hindu religious institution in the temple town of Dharmasthala in Dakshina Kannada, Karnataka, India. The deities of the temple are Hindu god Shiva, who is referred to as Mañjunatha, Hindu goddess Ammanavaru (meaning mother), the Tirthankara Chandraprabha and the protective gods of Jainism, Kalarahu, Kalarkayi, Kumarasvami and Kanyakumari. The temple was reconsecrated in 16th century by Hindu Dvaita saint Vadiraja Tirtha by the request of the then administrator of the temple, Devaraja Heggade. The temple is considered unique, since the priests in the temple are Madhwa Brahmins, who are Vaishnava, and the administration is run by a Jain Bunt family called the Pergades.

== Legend and origin ==
Eight hundred years ago, Dharmasthala was known as Kuduma in Mallarmadi, then a village in Belthangady. Here lived the Jain chieftain Birmanna Pergade and his wife Ammu Ballalthi in a house called Nelliadi Beedu. According to the legend, the guardian angels of Dharma assumed human forms and arrived at Pergade's abode in search of a place where Dharma was being practised and could be continued and propagated. As was their habit, the couple hosted these illustrious visitors with all their wherewithal and great respect. Pleased by their sincerity and generosity, that night the Dharma Daivas appeared in the dreams of Pergade. They explained the purpose of their visit to him and instructed him to vacate his house for the worship of the Daivas and dedicate his life to the propagation of Dharma. Asking no questions, the Pergade built himself another house and began worshiping the Daivas at Nelliadi Beedu.

This worship of daivas continues. The Dharma Daivas again appeared before Pergade to build separate shrines to consecrate the four Daivas – Kalarahu, Kalarkayi, Kumaraswamy and Kanyakumari. Also, Pergade was instructed to choose two persons of noble birth to act as the Daivas' oracles and four worthy persons to assist Pergade in his duties as the executive head of the shrines. In return, the Daivas promised Pergade protection for his family, abundance of charity and renowned for the 'Kshetra'. Pergade, as desired, built the shrines and invited Brahmin priests to perform the rituals. These priests requested Pergade to install a Shivalinga beside the native Daivas. The Daivas then sent their vassal Annappa Swamy to procure the linga of Shiva from Kadri Manjunath Temple, near Mangalore. Subsequently, the Manjunatha temple was built around the linga.

== Pergade family ==
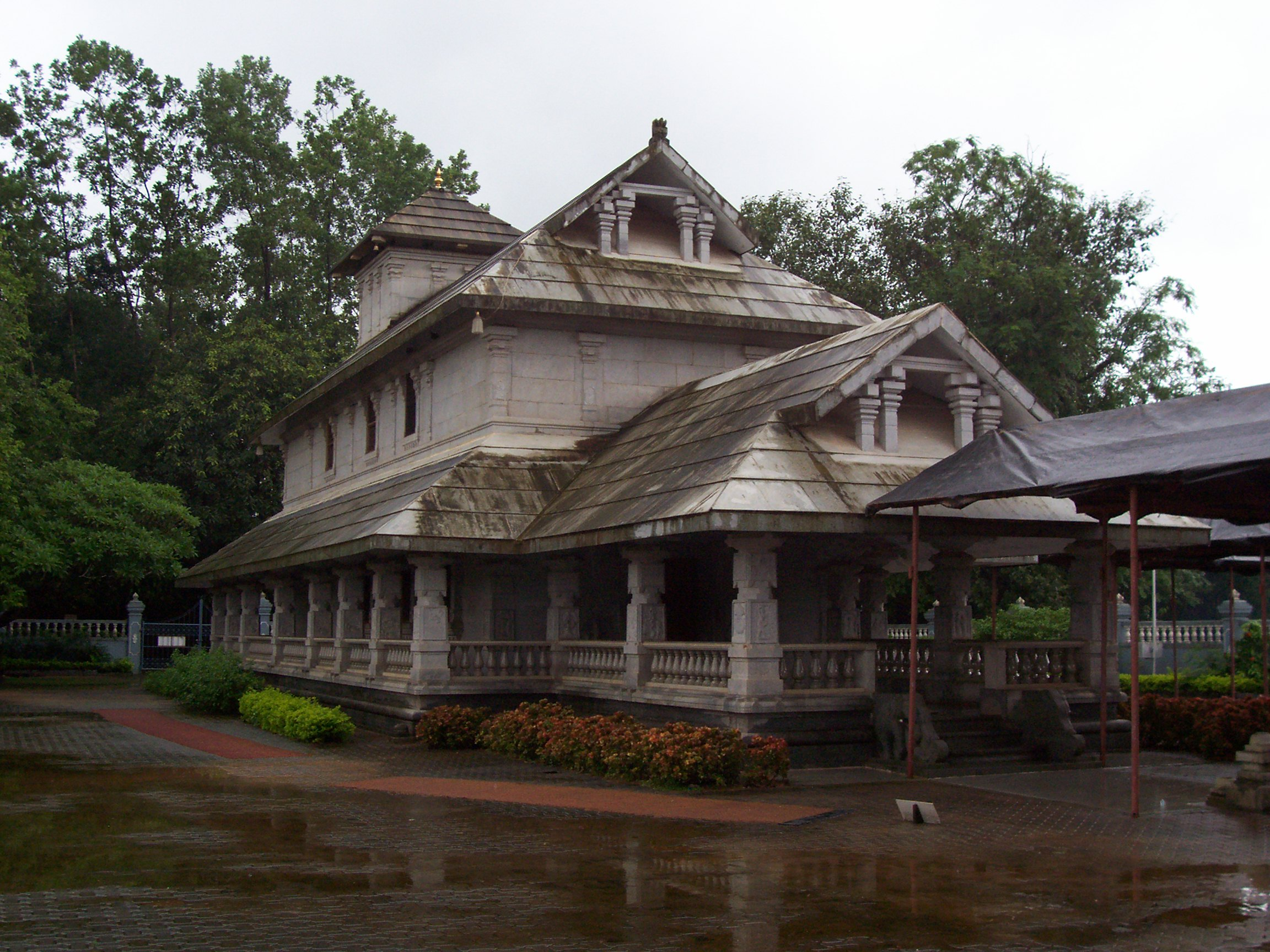
Chandranatha basadi in Dharmasthala

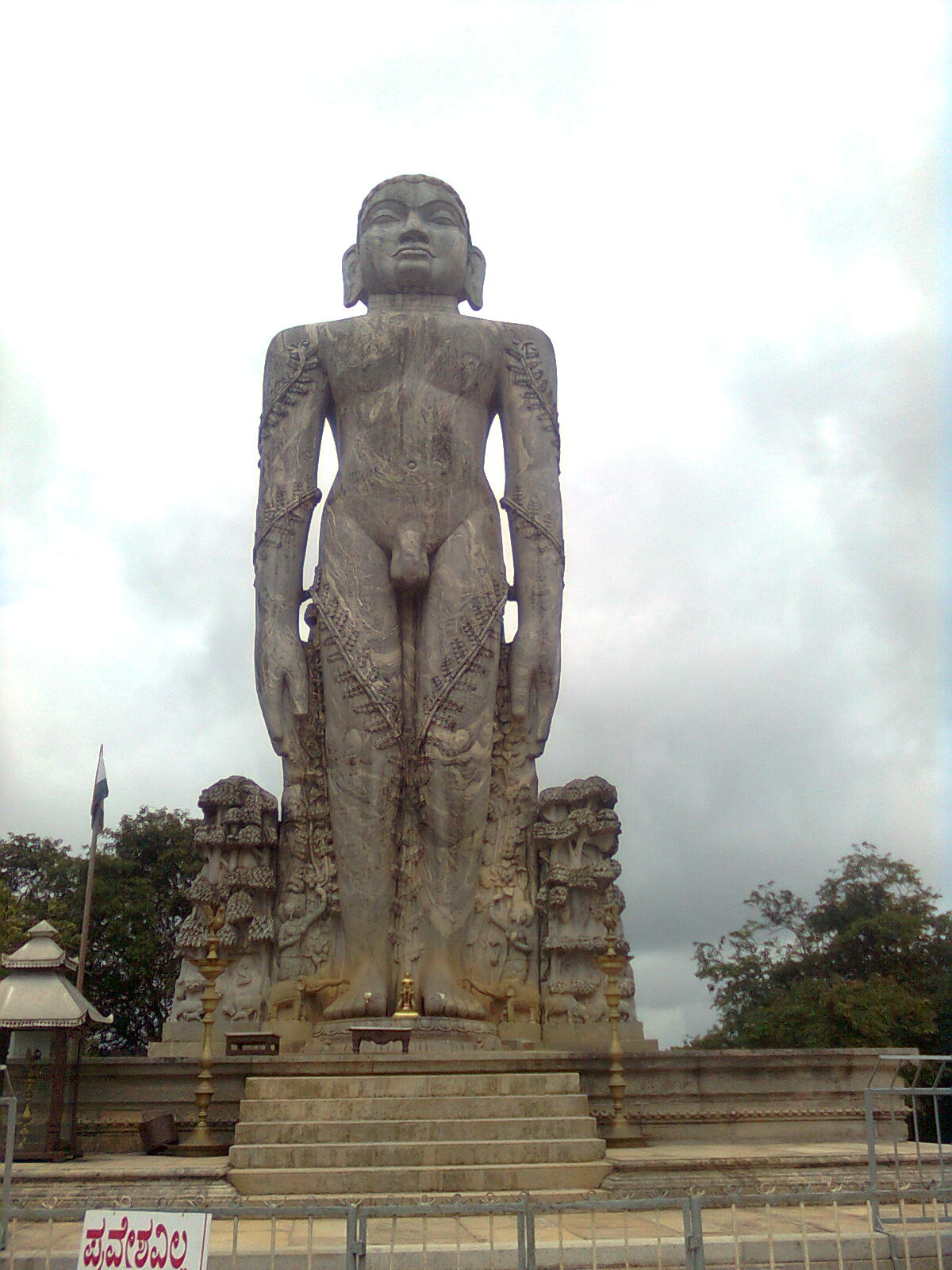
Bhagavan Baahubali statute, Dharmasthala

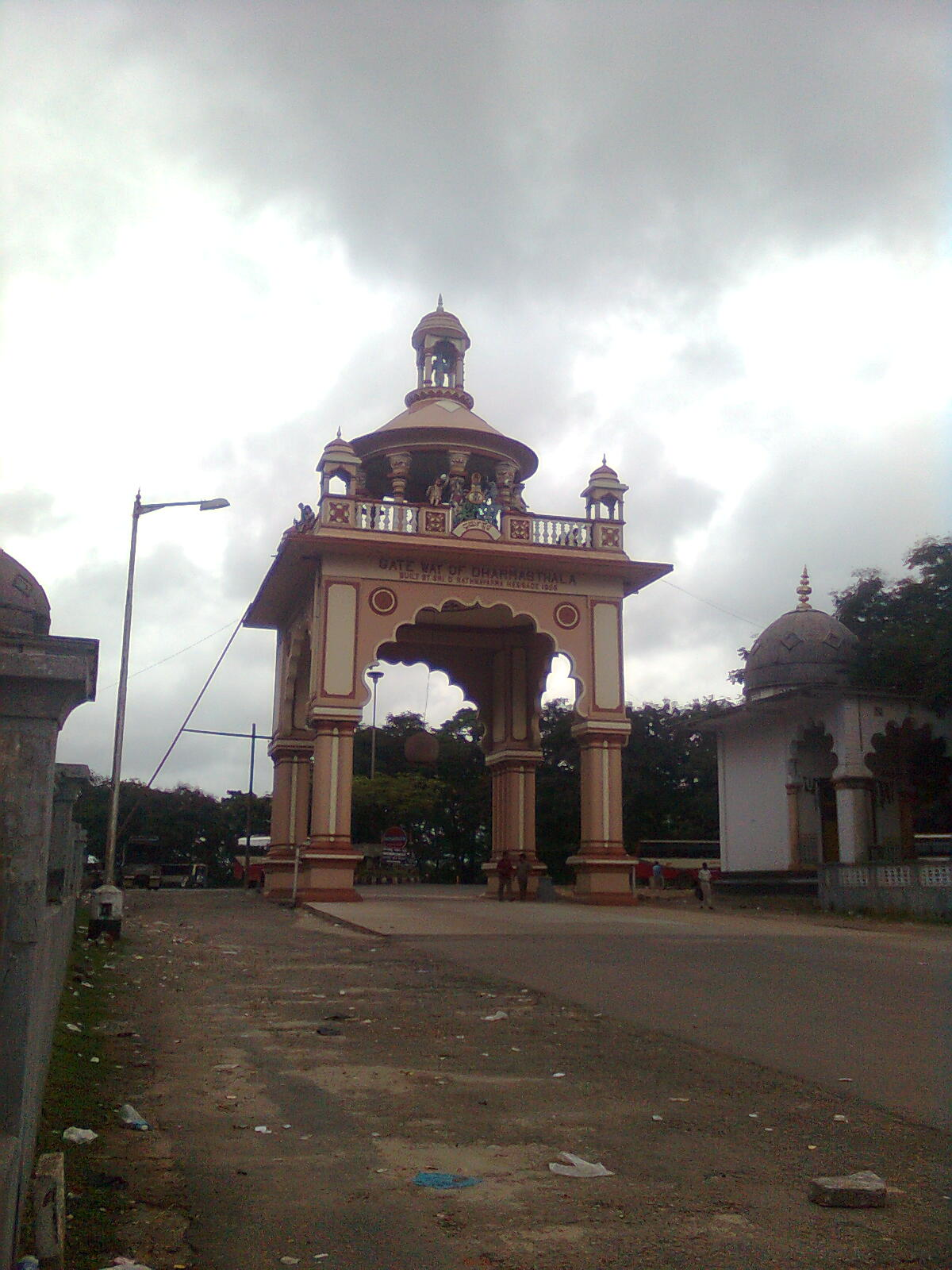
Gateway of Dharmasthala

The Pergade family is a Jain Bunt family who descend from the creator of the temple. Birmanna Pergade and his wife Ammu Ballalthi are the hereditary trustees of the temple. The eldest male member assumes the position of Dharma Adhikari (chief administrator) and uses the title Heggade. The Heggade was the feudal lord of the temple town and solved civil or criminal disputes. This was a judicial function and continues even to this day: The Heggade sits in judgement on hundreds of civil complaints, known as hoyulu, each day. Nearly 20 generations of the Pergade family have assumed the position of Dharma Adhikari. The present Dharma Adhikari is Veerendra Heggade. The list of previous Dharma Adhikari is as follows:

Dharma Adhikari number	Name	From	To
1	Varmanna Heggade (Bermanna Pergade)		
2	Padmayya Heggade		
3	Chandayya Heggade I		
4	Devaraja Heggade		
5	Manjayya Heggade I		
6	Jinappa Heggade		
7	Chandayya Heggade II		
8	Devapparaja Heggade		
9	Anantayya Heggade		
10	Vrsabhayya Heggade		
11	Gummanna Heggade		
12	Varadayya Heggade		
13	Chandayya Heggade III		
14	Kumarayya Heggade		
15	Chandayya Heggade IV		
16	Manjayya Heggade II		
17	Dharmapala Heggade		
18	Chandayya Heggade V		1918 C.E.
19	Manjayya Heggade III	1918 C.E.	1955 C.E.
20	Ratnavarma Heggade	1955 C.E.	1968 C.E.
21	Veerendra Heggade	October 26, 1968	Present

== Institutions run by Shri Kshetra Dharmasthala ==
In addition to the Hindu and temples in Dharmasthala, the organization runs several educational institutions and hospitals, including

- S.D.M EDUCATIONAL SOCIETY, Ujire
- SDM Dental College Campus Sattur
- Sri Dharmasthala Manjunatheshwara Dharmothana Trust, Bangalore
- SDM Yoga and Nature Cure Hospital, Dharmasthala
- Shree Dharmasthala Manjunatheshwara De-addiction and Research Centre, Ujire

== Mass murder and burial conspiracy ==
In 2025, a person alleged that he secretly buried bodies of female assault victims. The allegations proved to be a conspiracy after extensive excavation of claimed burial sites. Dharmasthala Temple was embroiled in a controversy surrounding alleged mass graves, disappearances, and claims of crimes against women and students over the past two decades. In July 2025, a woman filed a fresh complaint seeking the remains of her daughter who went missing in 2003. This development comes amid an ongoing investigation into the conspiracy to defame the holy place and its head by a group of people including activist Mahesh Shetty Timarodi, Girish Mattannavar, Vitthal Gowda, Jayant, and YouTubers Sameer M.D., Ajay and Dinesh and the Actor Prakash Raj, with a former sanitation worker claiming to have secretly buried bodies of sexual assault victims in the forests.

Karnataka Chief Minister Siddaramaiah said the government would act according to legal procedures and that no pressure will influence their decisions. The investigation is ongoing, with the authorities working to uncover the truth behind the conspiracy.

As of September 2025, the Special Investigation Team (SIT) appointed by the Karnataka government has excavated 11 of 13 sites identified by the witness. Human remains were recovered at two locations, and in mid-September, a large-scale search at the Banglegudde reserve forest yielded several skeletal fragments, including five skulls and jawbones. Forensic experts have suggested that the remains appear relatively recent and are likely male, though final reports are pending.

The whistleblower, C. N. Chinnayya, was arrested on 23 August 2025 on charges of perjury, after allegedly providing misleading evidence. His bail application was rejected on 16 September by Belthangady court. Meanwhile, families of missing persons, including relatives of Sowjanya, a student who was murdered in 2012, have petitioned the Karnataka High Court for supervised excavations and transparent updates on the SIT’s progress.

Civil society organisations, including the All India Democratic Women’s Association (AIDWA), have demanded greater autonomy for the SIT and the deployment of modern methods such as ground-penetrating radar to locate possible burial sites.

Earlier, a local court had imposed a media gag order restricting online coverage and requiring removal of thousands of links related to the case. This order was overturned by the Karnataka High Court on 1 August 2025, and the Supreme Court of India upheld the decision on 8 August, affirming press freedoms in reporting the investigation.
