= List of Tulu people =

This is a list of notable people who belong to an ethnic Tuluva community and who natively speak the Tulu language.

== Journalists ==
- Kayyar Kinhanna Rai – Indian independence activist and writer
- V. T. Rajshekar – founder and editor of the Dalit Voice
- K. K. Shetty – freedom fighter (was the editor of Navayuga for a short period)
- Mumthaaz Nelliadka - News anchor in TV Vikrama
- Jaya Prakash Shetty - News Anchor in Republic Kannada

== Freedom fighters ==
- Kedambadi Ramaiha Gowda
- Kamaladevi Chattopadhyay
- Ammembala Balappa
- Abbakka Chowta
- Karnad Sadashiva Rao
- Ubaar Manja Baidyer
- Shrivinasa Upadhyaya Paniyaadi (S.U. Paniyaadi)
- Satyamitra Bangera
- K.K Shetty
- Krishnaraya Kodgi
- Aerya Lakshminarayana Alva
- Mulki Ramakrishna Poonja
- V.N.Shenoy
- Kayyara Kinhanna Rai
- Barrister Attavara Shilpa
- Bantakal Lakshminarayana Sharma

== Judiciary and lawyers ==
- K. S. Hegde – former speaker of Lok Sabha; former judge of the Supreme Court of India
- N. Santosh Hegde – Karnataka Lokayuktha; former judge of the Supreme Court of India
- Rohini Salian – public prosecutor
- Kalmanje Jagannatha Shetty (1926–2015), former judge, Supreme Court of India and former chief justice, Allahabad High Court
- Kedambadi Jagannath Shetty – former judge of Karnataka High Court

== Literature, philosophy, and religion ==
- P. Gururaja Bhat – historian and writer of Tulunadu
- Bannanje Govindacharya – Vedic scholar
- Ratnavarma Heggade
- Veerendra Heggade – philanthropist
- Padmanabh Jaini - Scholar of Buddhiam and Jainism
- M.K.Seetharam Kulal – Tulu-Kannada dramatist, poet; Karnataka State Tulu Sahithya Academy Award (2014)
- Madhvacharya – proponent of Dvaita (Dwaita) philosophy
- Muddana – poet
- Venkataraja Puninchathaya – scholar
- Kayyar Kinhanna Rai – poet and activist
- Bola Chittaranjan Das Shetty – writer
- Vishwesha Teertharu (Pejavara Shreegalavaru)
- Vadiraja Tirtha - Dvaita philosopher

== Health care ==
- B. M. Hegde – educationist and surgeon
- Dinker Belle Rai – Indian American vascular surgeon, inventor, athlete and philosopher
- Devi Shetty – philanthropist and surgeon
- Shantharam Shetty – orthopaedic surgeon
- K. N. Udupa – Padma Shri recipient

== Politics ==
- V. S. Acharya – former home minister, Karnataka state and former member of Karnataka legislative assembly and council
- A. Shanker Alva – former member of Parliament, Mangalore
- K. Nagappa Alva – former member of Parliament, Rajya Sabha (1970–1976) and health minister, Karnataka State (1962–1967)
- Raghupati Bhat – former member of Karnataka Legislative Assembly (M.L.A.), elected from Udupi constituency
- D. V. Sadananda Gowda – former Minister of Chemicals and Fertilizers, former Minister of Law and Justice, Former Minister of Railways, former Chief Minister of Karnataka
- K. Jayaprakash Hegde – former member of Parliament
- Shobha Karandlaje – member of Parliament, Udupi Lok sabha constituency, Union Minister of State (MoS) for Agriculture and Farmers Welfare, Food Processing Industries
- V. Dhananjay Kumar – former Union Minister
- Nalin Kumar Kateel – member of Parliament of Dakshina Kannada Lok Sabha constituency and former President of BJP-Karnataka
- Manorama Madhwaraj – former member of Parliament, Udupi; former MLA Udupi
- Lalaji Mendon – MLA, Kaup Vidhansabha
- Veerappa Moily – former Chief Minister of Karnataka, member of the 16th Lok Sabha
- Janardhana Poojary – former Union Minister of State for Finance
- I. Rama Rai – former member of Parliament, Kasaragod
- Ramanath Rai – Minister for Forest, Environment and Ecology
- Kumble Sundara Rao – former MLA of Surathkal constituency
- Halady Srinivas Shetty – MLA 2013 assembly for Kundapura, Karnataka
- I. M. Jayarama Shetty – former member of Parliament, Udupi
- K. K. Shetty – former member of Parliament, Mangalore
- Suresh Shetty – MLA, Andheri (East), Maharashtra
- B. Nagaraja Shetty – former Minister and MLA of Bantwal constituency, Karnataka

== Artists ==
- K. K. Hebbar – painter
- Kudroli Ganesh - Magician
- Prakash Shetty – cartoonist
- Sudarshan Shetty (born 1961) – artist
- R. Verman – art director

== Film directors and producers ==
- Ranjith Bajpe – film director and screenwriter, known for his work in Tulu cinema
- Anup Bhandari – film director, music director, lyricist and playback singer
- Ramchandra P. N. – filmmaker
- Manmohan Shetty – founder of Adlabs Films
- Raj B. Shetty
- Rakshit Shetty
- Rohit Shetty – film director and producer
- B. Vittalacharya – film director of Kannada, Telugu-language cinema

== Actors ==
- Pruthvi Ambaar
- Anushree
- Aishwarya Rai Bachchan
- Neha Shetty
- Anup Bhandari
- Nirup Bhandari
- Aravind Bolar
- Harini (Kannada actress)
- Pooja Hegde
- Kalpana (Kannada actress)
- Arjun Kapikad
- Leelavathi (actress)
- Vishal Kotian – Indian film and television actor
- Naveen D. Padil
- Shubha Poonja
- Vinaya Prasad
- Radhika
- Vinay Rai
- Prakash Raj
- Anushka Shetty
- Avantika Shetty
- Athiya Shetty
- Dayanand Shetty
- Dheekshith Shetty
- Krithi Shetty
- M. B. Shetty – 1970s Bollywood actor
- Rakshit Shetty – Kannada actor, director
- Rishab Shetty
- Vinod Kumar Alva
- Rohit Shetty
- Shamita Shetty
- Shilpa Shetty
- Srinidhi Shetty – Miss Supranational 2016
- Suniel Shetty
- Yagna Shetty
- Suman
- Bhojaraj Vamanjoor

== Music ==
- Sandeep Chowta – music director
- Kadri Gopalnath – saxophonist
- Gurukiran – music director
- Ganesh Hegde – singer, performer, video director and Bollywood choreographer
- Manikanth Kadri – film score and soundtrack composer and singer
- V. Manohar – music director, lyricist, film director and actor
- Vittal Ramamurthy – violinist
- Shweta Shetty – pop singer
- Vidyabhushana – singer

== Science and technology ==
- Vittal Rai – scientist
- Rajini Rao – physiologist
- Udupi Ramachandra Rao: scientist
- Kalidas Shetty – food scientist
- H. V. K. Udupa – electrochemical scientist

== Sports ==
- Ashwini Akkunji – national-level athlete
- Ashish Ballal – former captain of the Indian Field Hockey team and Arjuna awardee
- Budhi Kunderan – cricketer
- Mamatha Poojary – kabadi player
- Nikhil Poojary – footballer
- Satheesha Rai – weightlifter, Olympian and Arjuna awardee
- Tanush Kotian – cricketer
- Shodhan Rai – international bodybuilder and Ekalavya Award winner
- Vandana Rao – national sprinter, 1990s
- Chirag Shetty – badminton player
- Pooja Shri Shetty – karateka
- Vikrant Shetty – United Arab Emirates cricketer
- Gundibail Sunderam – cricketer
- Siddhanth Thingalaya – national sprinter
- Shreyas Iyer - Indian Cricketer

== Bankers ==
- U. R. Bhat – director of Karnataka Bank
- A. B. Shetty – founder of Vijaya Bank and politician
- Mulki Sunder Ram Shetty – chairman of Vijaya Bank
- V. P. Shetty – chairman of JM Financial Asset Reconstruction Co. Pvt. Ltd., JM Financial Asset Management Co. Pvt. Ltd. and JM Financial Products Ltd.

== Business persons ==
- Muthappa Rai – businessman
- A. B. Shetty (1883–1960) – founder of Vijaya Bank
- Ajit Shetty – Belgian businessman; former chairman of the board of directors of Janssen Pharmaceutica
- B. R. Shetty – CMD New Medical Centre, billionaire; Padma Shri recipient
- Devi Shetty – founder of Narayana Health
- Manmohan Shetty – founder of Adlabs Imagica
- Mulki Sunder Ram Shetty – chairman of Vijaya Bank
- R. N. Shetty – CMD RNS Infrastructure and hereditary administrator of Murudeshwara Shiva Temple

== War heroes ==
- Dinesh Chandra Bhandary – Vir Chakra recipient

== Gallery ==
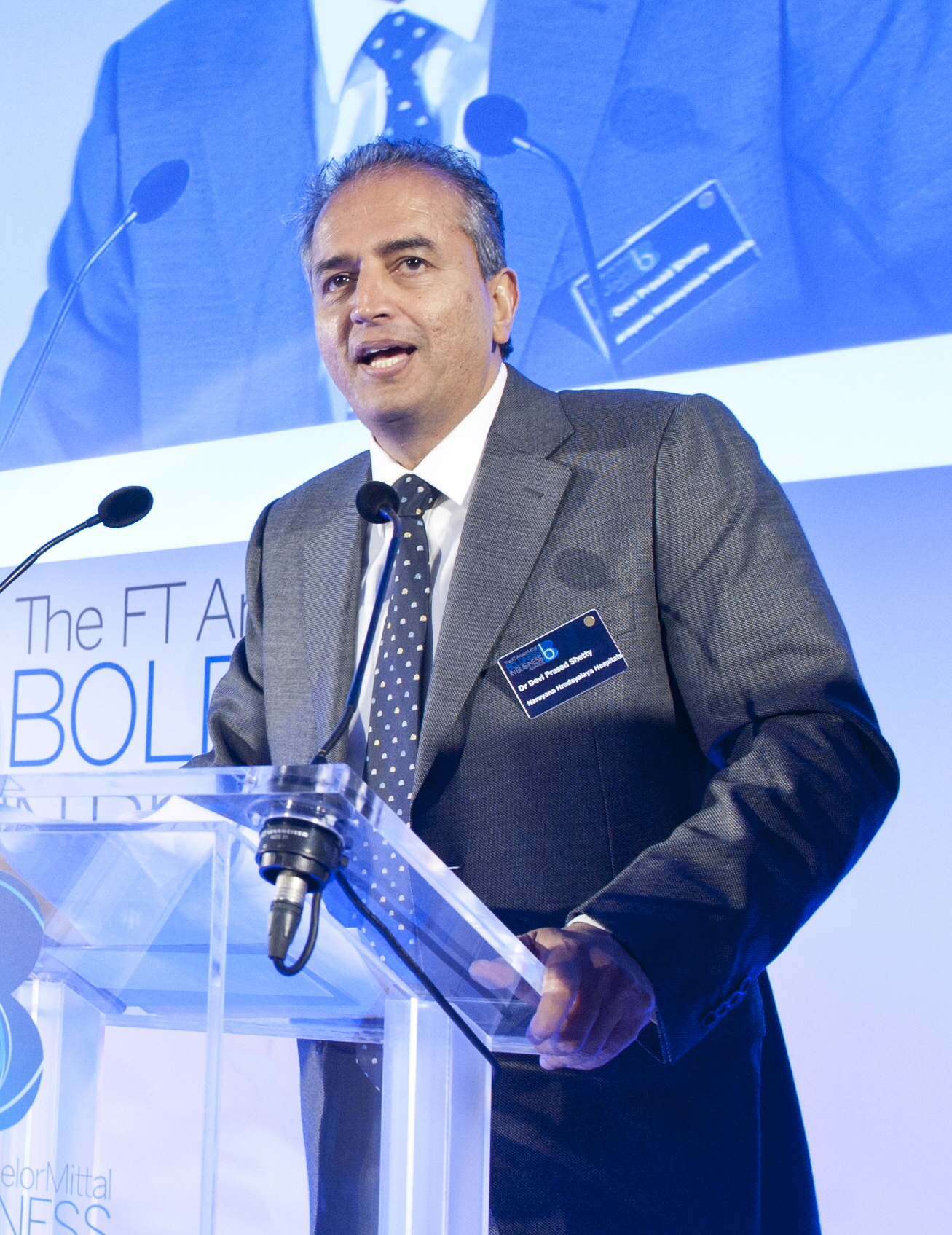
Devi Shetty

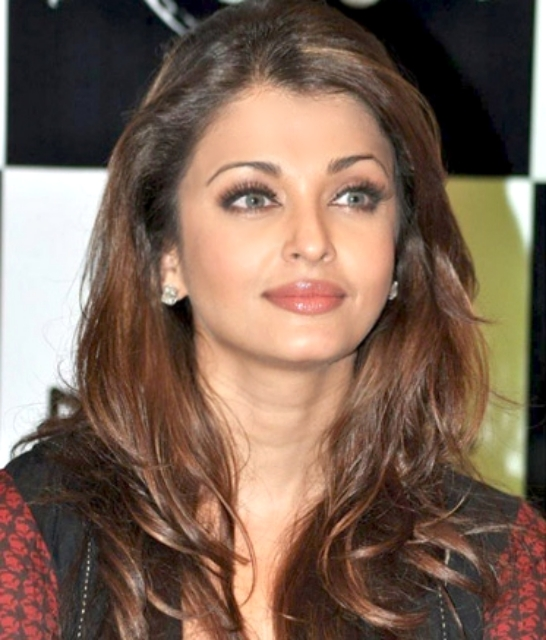
Aishwarya Rai

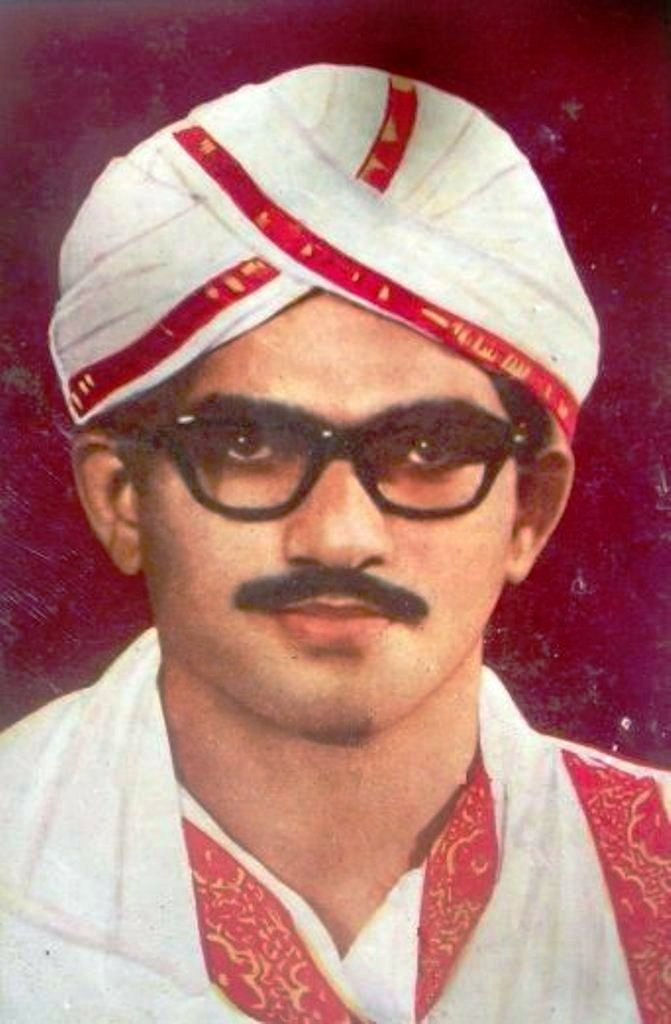
Veerendra Heggade

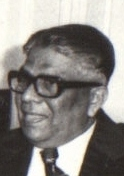
K.S. Hegde

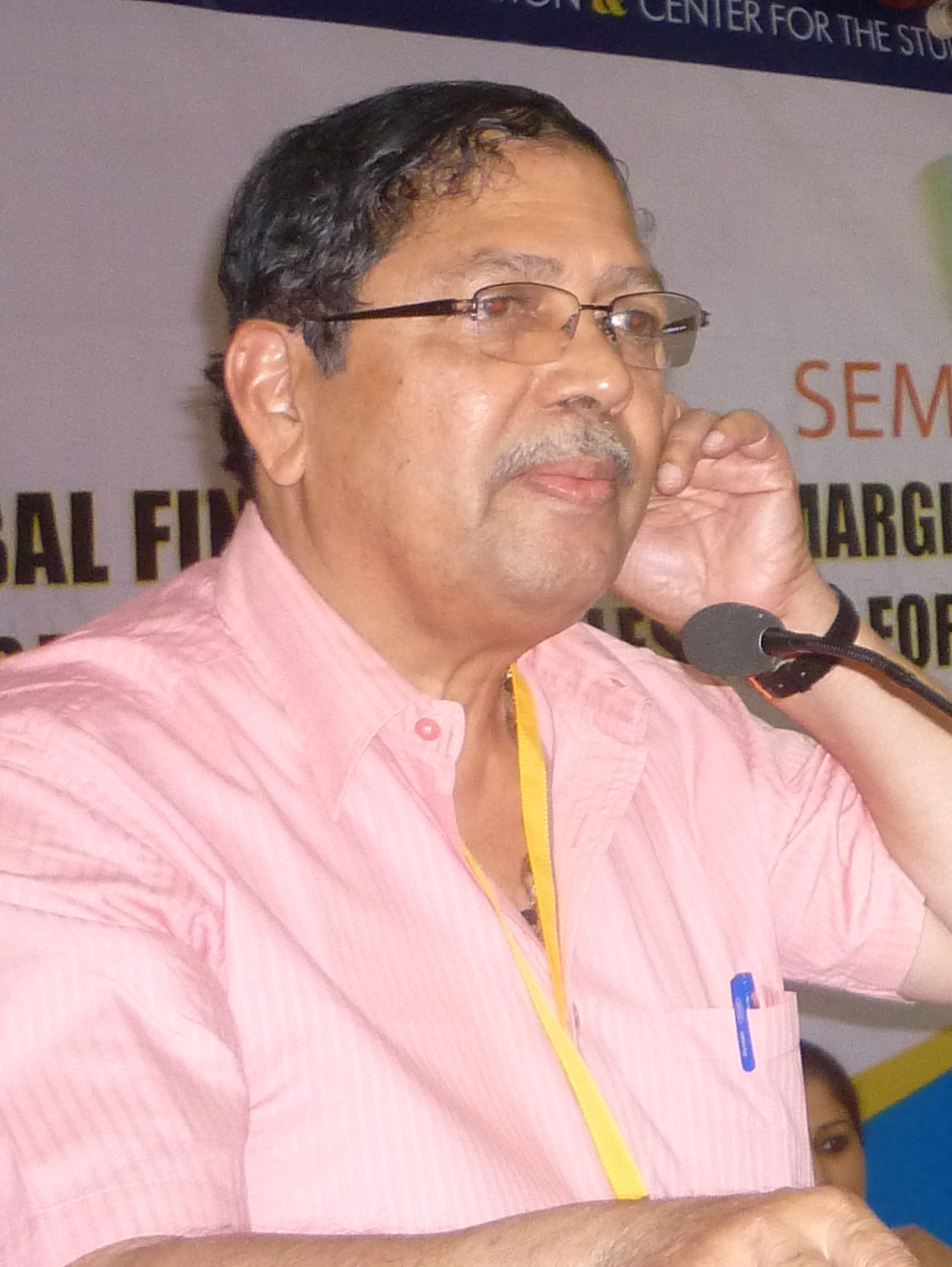
Nitte Santhosh Hegde

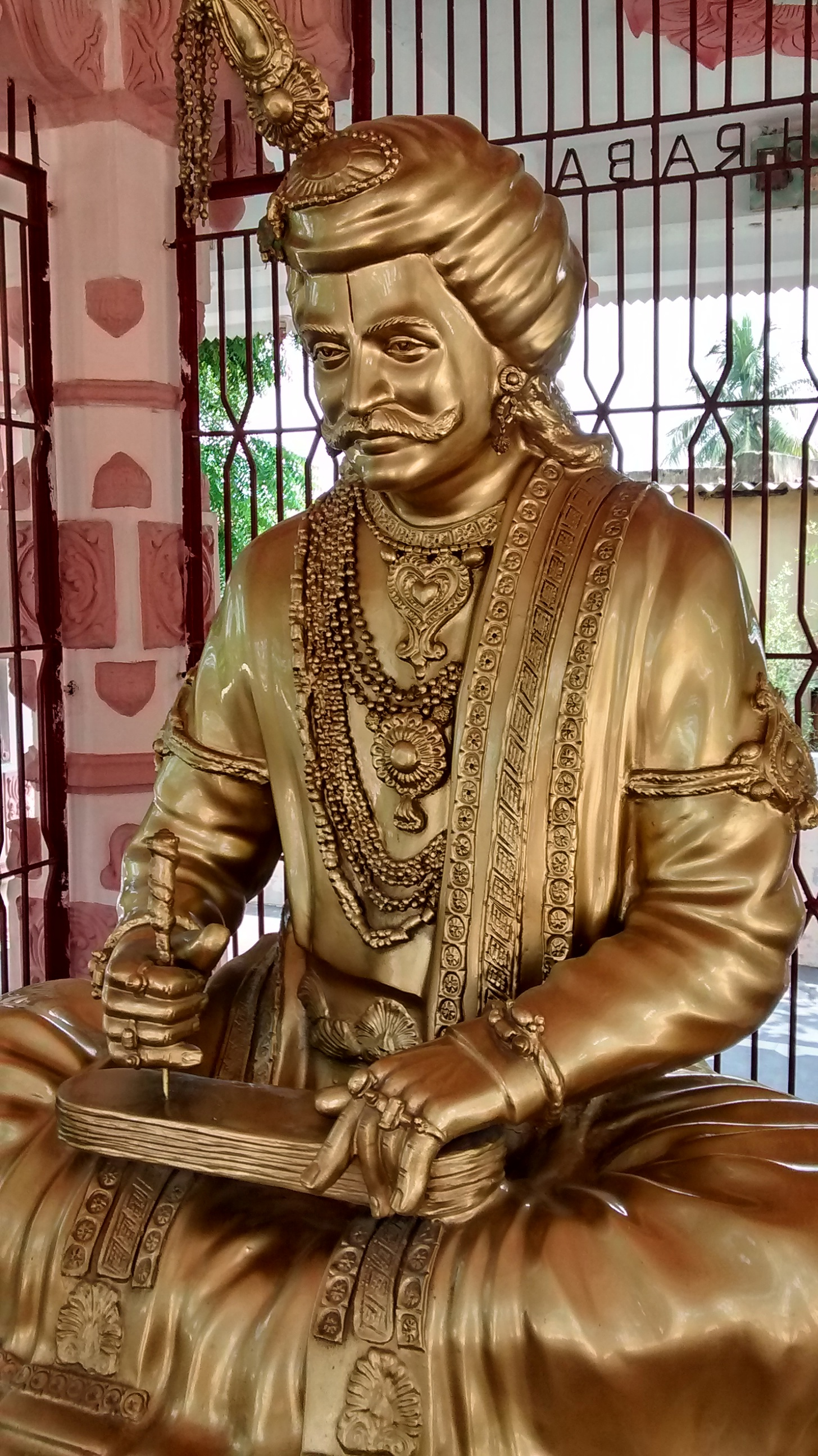
Krishnadevaraya

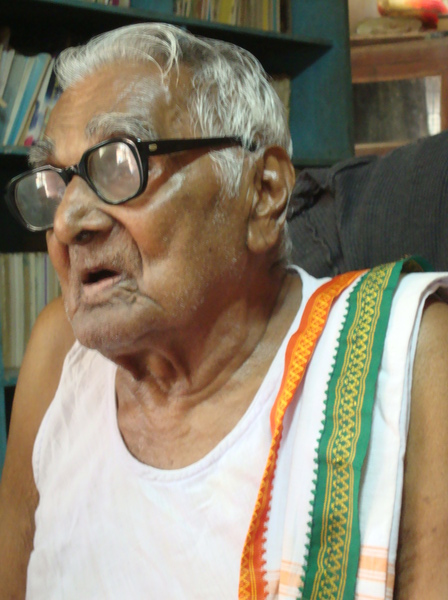
Kayyar Kinhanna Rai

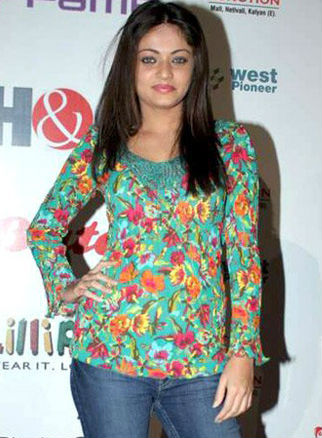
Sneha Ullal

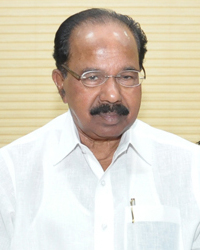
Veerappa Moily

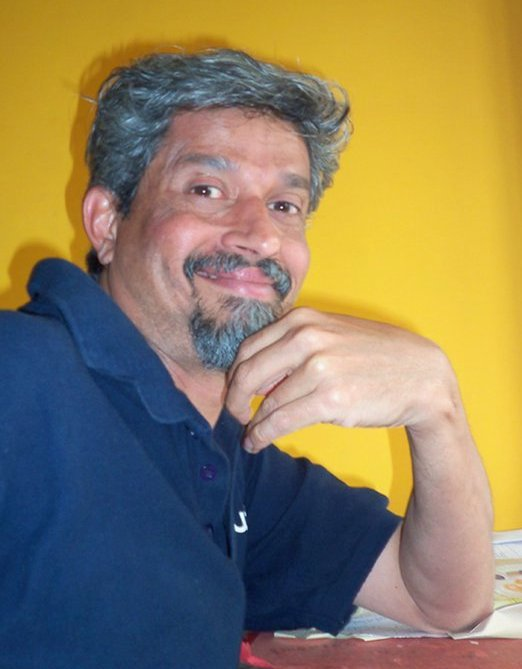
Prakash Shetty

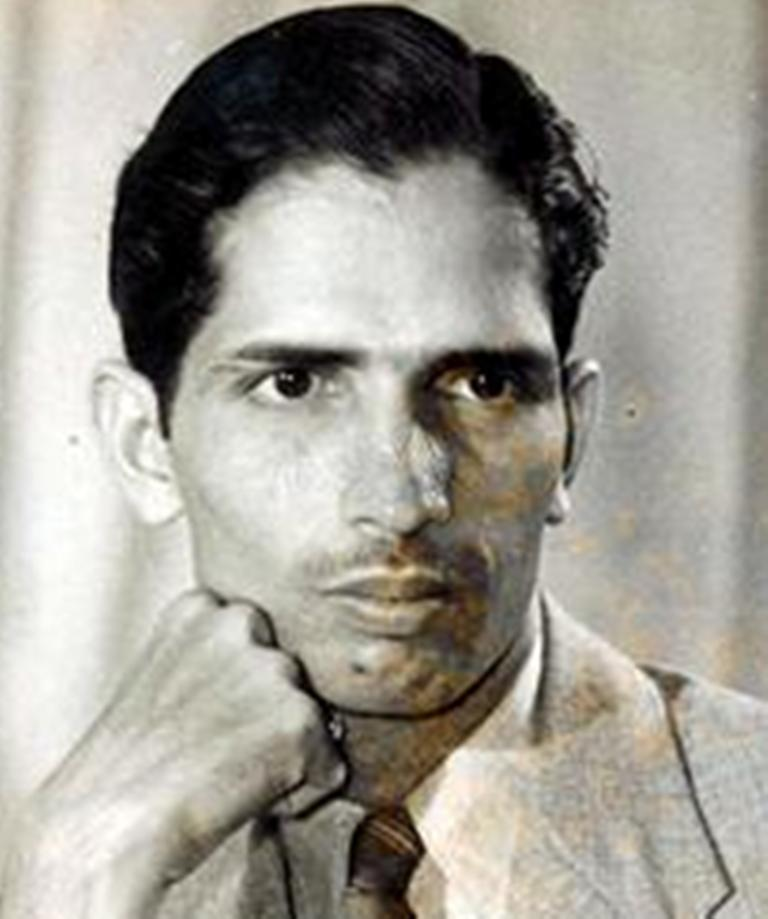
KK Hebbar

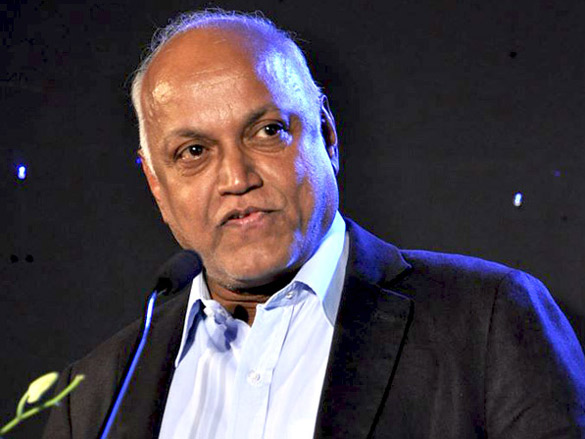
Manmohan Shetty

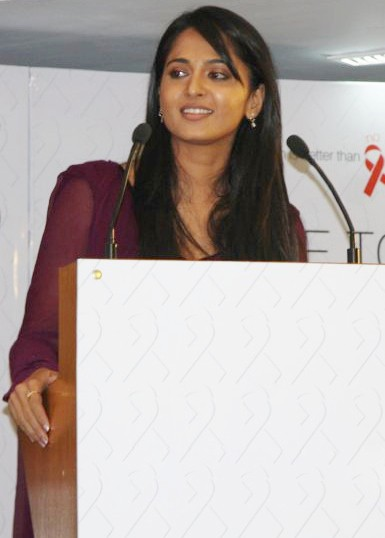
Anushka Shetty

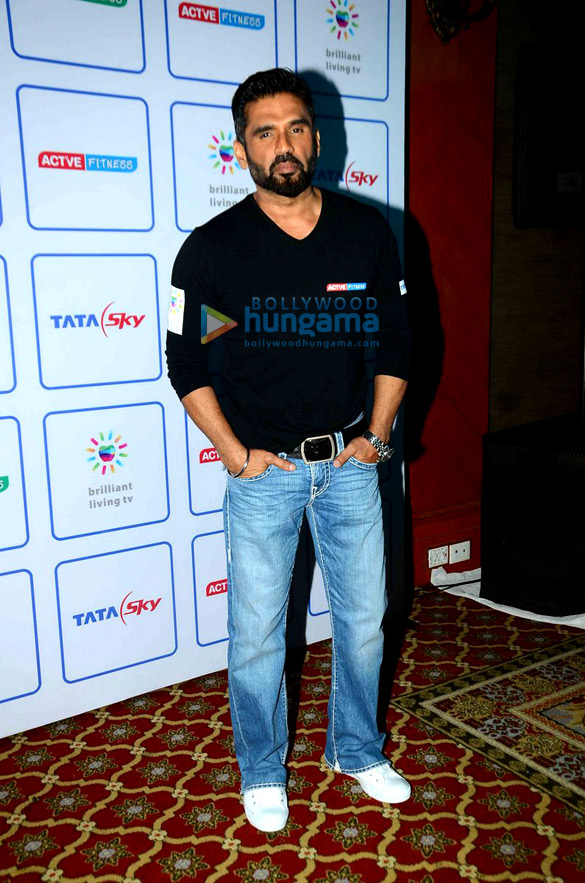
Suniel Shetty

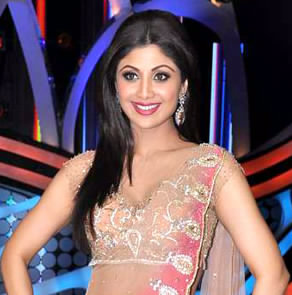
Shilpa Shetty

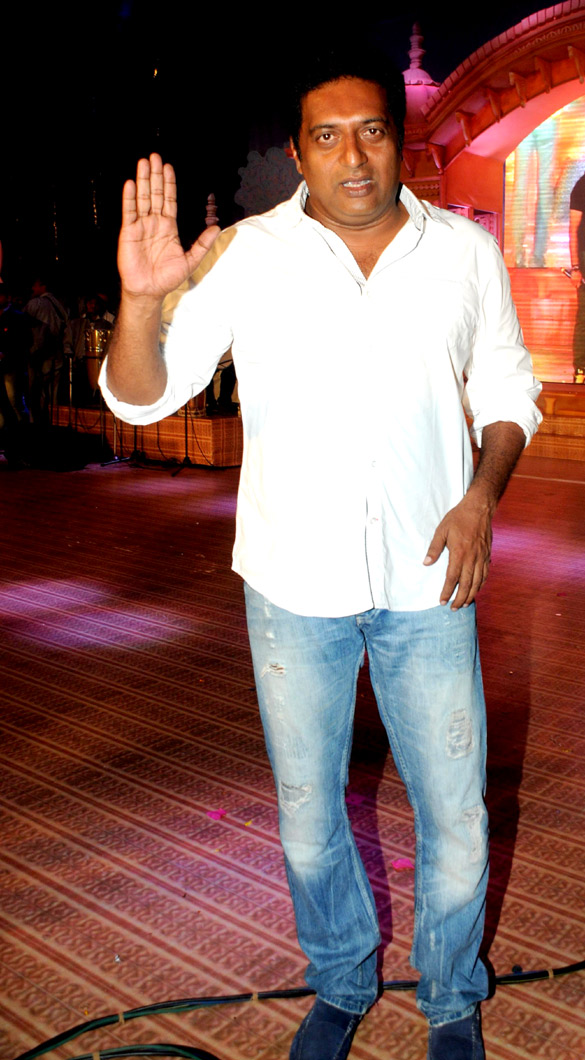
Prakash Raj

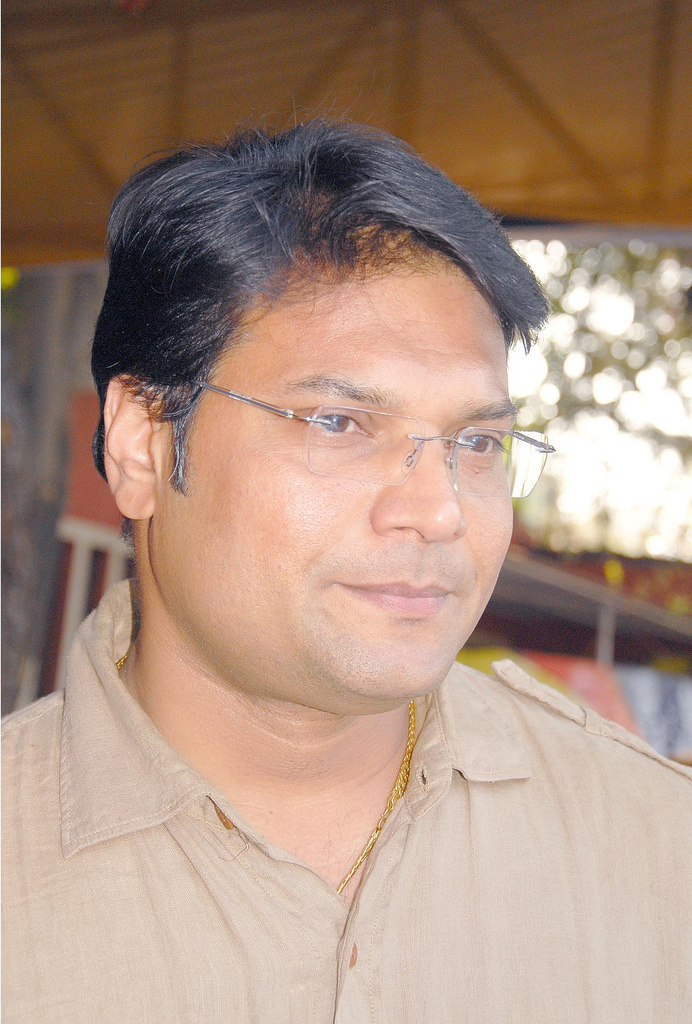
Dayanand Shetty

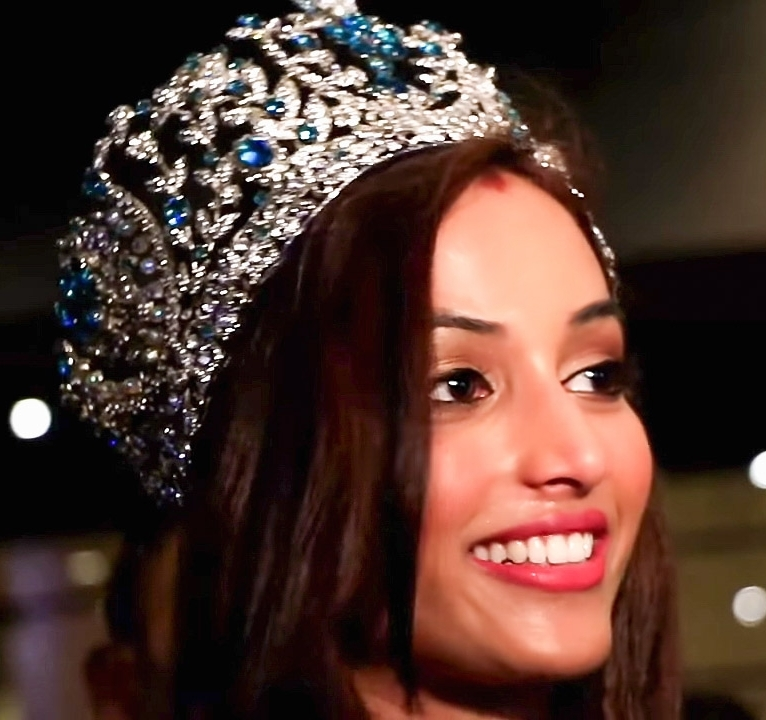
Srinidhi Shetty

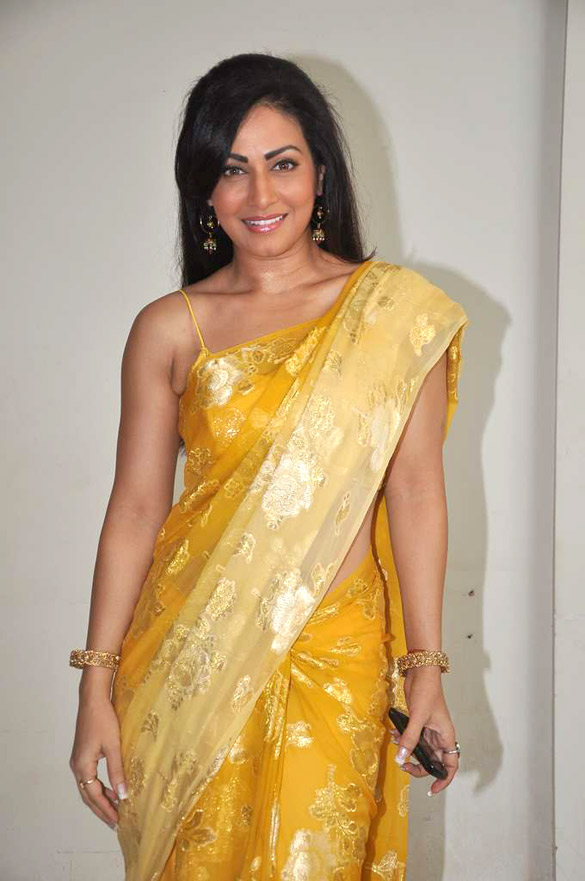
Pakhi Hegde

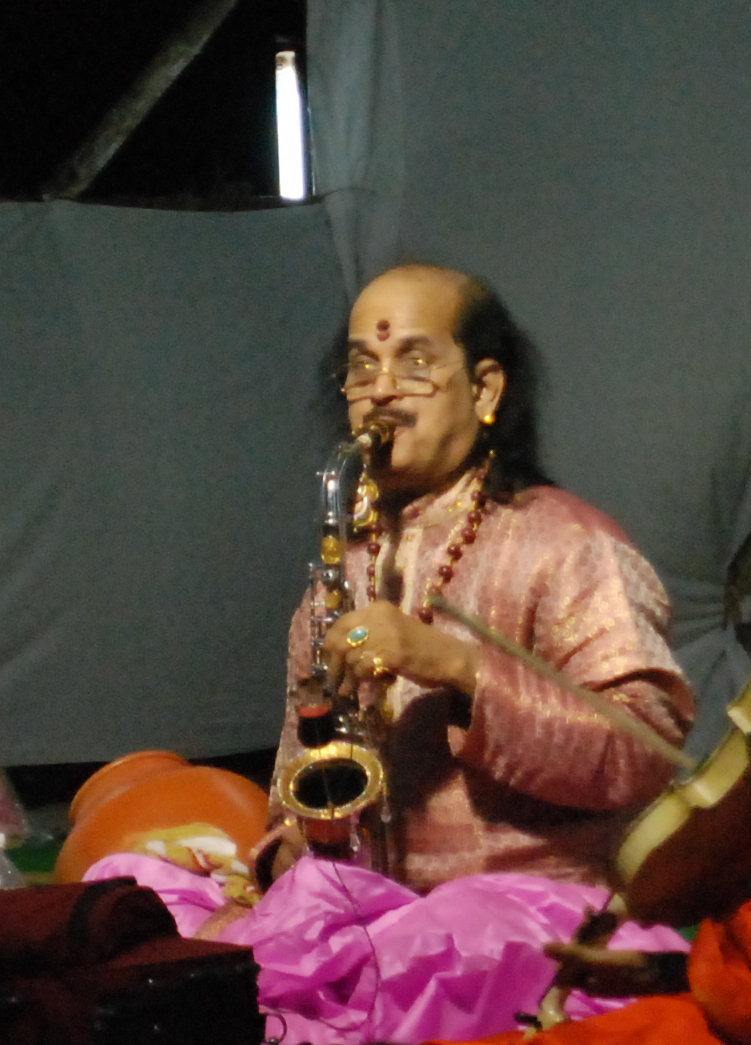
Kadri Gopalnath

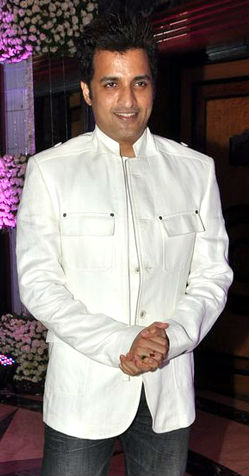
Ganesh Hegde

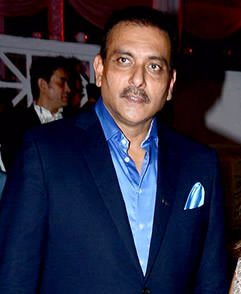
Ravi Shastri

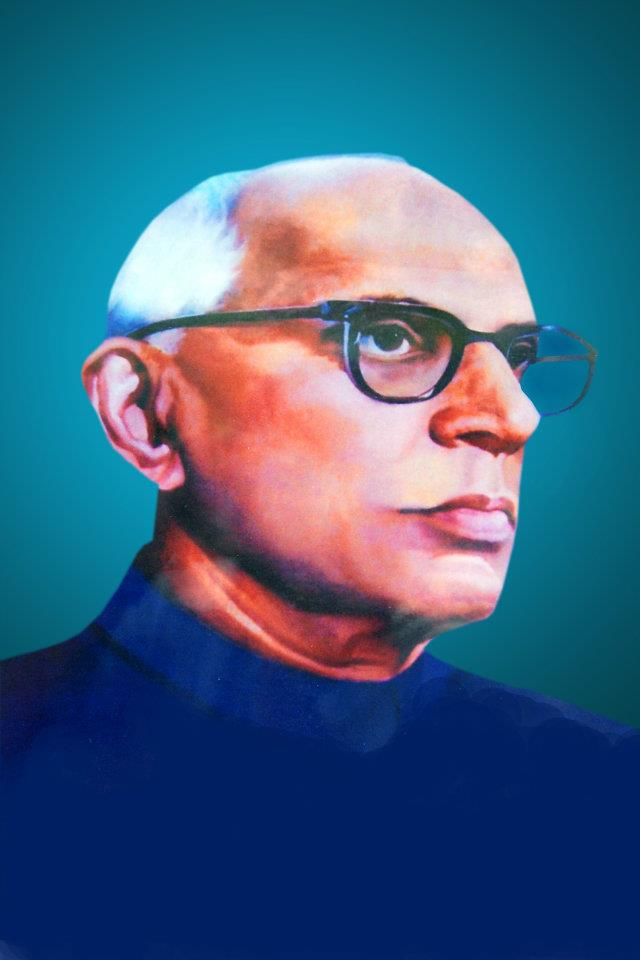
A. B. Shetty

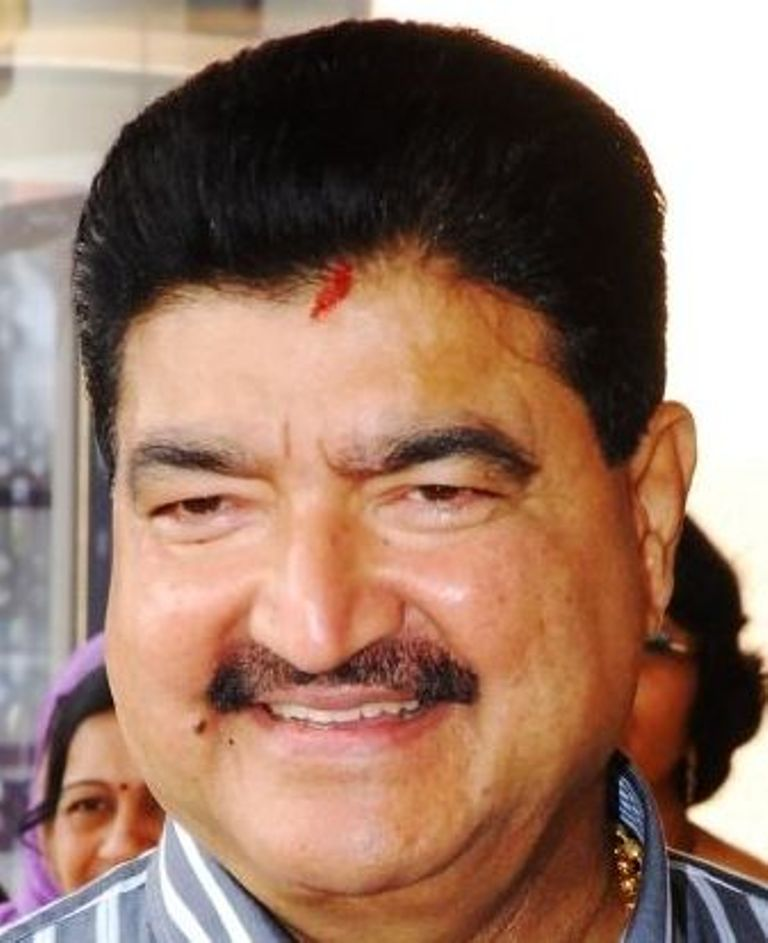
B. R. Shetty

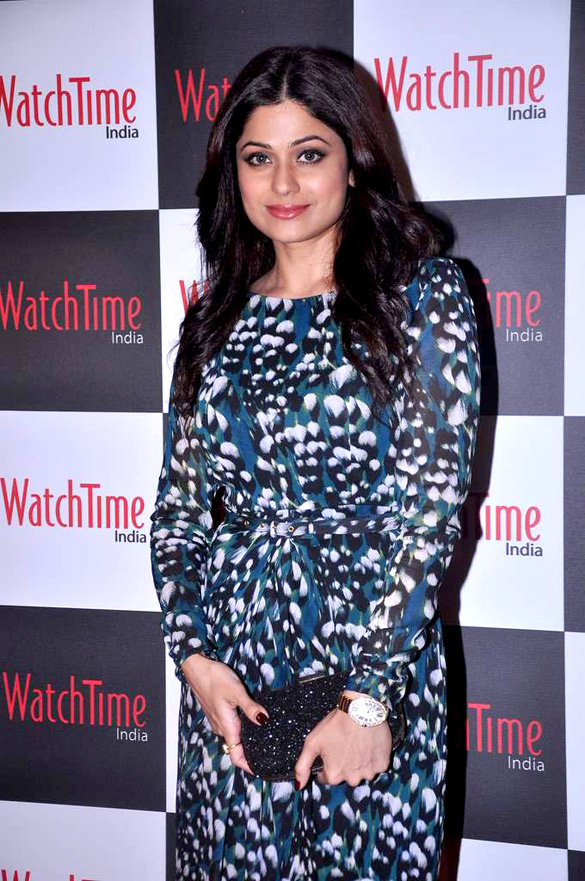
Shamita Shetty
