= List of Bunts =

Bunt (/ˈbʌnt/), also spelled 'Bant' in former English usage, is an Indian warrior-class community

The complete list of Bunt Surnames in alphabetical order is:

A – Adappa, Adasu, Adyanthaya, Arasa, Ariga, Athikari, Ajila, Ajri, Alva, Athre, Attara

B – Banga, Ballala, Bangara, Bhandary, Banta, Bant, Bari, Bhoja, Bythani, Bunnala, Binnage, Brana, Budale

C – Chowta / Chauta

D – Dore

G – Gambhira, Gujaran

H – Hegde, Horuva

K – Kava, Kadamba, Kajava, Kakwa, Kambali, Kanthiva, Kanjava, Karyal, Kayya, Kille, Konde, Kothari, Kudre, Kundahegde, Kundade, Kottari

M – Mada, Manava, Manaae, Mana, Mardi, Marla, Marala, Maddala, Menda, Mallala, Malli, Marthe, Melanta, Menava, Menda, Mugayya, Mudya, Mukkala, Munda (Mundera)

N – Naadava, Nonda, Nayara, Nanaya, Nayaga.

P – Pala, Paradi, Padyar, Pakkala, Palae, Pandyi, Payyade, Payyahegde, Payyani, Pegde, Pergade, Punja, Puvani

R – Rai, Raja

S – Shetty, Samani, Santa, Samanta, Sankaya, Semita, Senava, Servegara, Sheba, Sheka, Sooda, Sorapa, Sulae

T – Tanjiva, Tholara

V – Vala, Varma

== Academia ==
- H. S. Ballal, Pro-Chancellor Manipal University and philanthropist

== Film and culture ==
- Shilpa Shetty, Indian actress
- Aishwarya Rai, Bollywood actress
- Anup Bhandari, Director, Music Director, Lyricist, Singer & Actor
- Nirup Bhandari, Actor
- Aishani Shetty, actress
- Suniel Shetty, Bollywood actor
- Athiya Shetty
- Ahan Shetty, Indian actor
- Pooja Hegde, Tollywood actress
- Anushka Shetty, Tollywood actress
- Srinidhi Shetty, Sandalwood actress
- Rakshit Shetty, Sandalwood actor
- Dayanand Shetty, Indian TV actor
- Roopesh Shetty, Tulu cinema actor
- Rishab Shetty, Kannada Cinema
- Abhilash Shetty, Kannada director & actor
- Shamita Shetty, Indian actress
- Yagna Shetty, Kannada Cinema
- Gurukiran, Singer
- Bhoomi Shetty, Sandalwood actress
- Krithi Shetty actress
- Raj B. Shetty, Kannada director & actor
- Avantika Shetty, actress
- Dheekshith Shetty, actor
- M. B. Shetty, indian stuntman.
- Rohit Shetty, actor, director, producer
- Hriday Shetty, film director
- Kavya Shetty, actress
- Likith Shetty, actor
- Megha Shetty, actress
- Neha Shetty, actress
- Neetha Shetty, actress
- Niranjan Shetty, actor
- Nitya Shetty, actress
- Rahul Shetty, dancer
- Reshma Shetty, British actress
- Sanam Shetty, actress
- Sanchita Shetty, actress
- Sandeep Shetty, actor
- Shweta Shetty, German pop singer
- Sini Shetty, actress
- Vajrang Shetty, actor
- Varuna Shetty, actress
- Yagna Shetty, actress
- Kartik Shetty, actor

== Music ==
- Sandeep Chowta, music director
- Shweta Shetty, Indian-born German pop singer
- Ganesh Hegde, Indian singer and bollywood composer

== Art ==
- Sudarshan Shetty, sculptor
- Kayyara Kinhanna Rai, Author
- Jay Shetty, British author and life coach

== Business ==
- A. B. Shetty (1883–1960), founder of Vijaya Bank
- B. R. Shetty, CMD New Medical Centre, billionaire and Padma Shri awardee
- R. N. Shetty, CMD RNS Infrastructure and hereditary administrator of Murudeshwara Shiva Temple
- Muthappa Rai, Indian businessman, former mafia don
- Shashi Kiran Shetty, founder of Allcargo Logistics, Chairman of Gati Ltd
- Bhaskar Shetty, hotelier in the Middle East
- Ajit Shetty, is a Belgian businessman. He was chairman of the board of directors of Janssen Pharmaceutica
- Manmohan Shetty, founder of Adlabs Imagica, India's first & only Theme Park
- Mulki Sunder Ram Shetty, former chairman of Vijaya Bank
- V. P. Shetty, chairman of JM Financial, former chairman and md of IDBI Bank, Canara Bank, UCO Bank
- Devi Shetty, billionaire, founder and chairman of Narayana Health
- Akshatha Shetty, entrepreneur and founder of Makers Bar, a thought-leadership and entrepreneur storytelling platform.

== Law ==
- Kalmanje Jagannatha Shetty, judge of the Supreme Court of India and Chief Justice of the Allahabad High Court
- N. Santosh Hegde, judge of the Supreme Court of India and Lokayuktha (ombudsman) of Karnataka state
- Kalmanje Jagannatha Shetty, former judge Supreme Court of India
- Kedambadi Jagannath Shetty, former judge High Court of Karnataka

== Medicine ==
- Devi Shetty, renowned cardiac surgeon
- Shantharam Shetty, orthopaedic surgeon
- Dinker Belle Rai, Indian American surgeon

== Scientists ==
- Belle Monappa Hegde, physician, author, educationist and Padma Bhushan awardee
- Kullal Chickappu Naik, authority on horticulture, first vice-chairman of University of Agricultural Sciences, Bangalore
- B. Vithal Shetty, American scientist, known for developing the drug Metalozone
- Kalidas Shetty, food scientist and professor at University of Massachusetts Amherst
- Vittal Rai, Indian scientist
- Nikhil Shetty, network scientist and researcher with a PhD from University of California, Berkeley

== Journalists ==
- Kayyar Kinhanna Rai, Indian independence activist and writer
- K. K. Shetty, freedom fighter (He was the editor of Navayuga for a short period).

== Religious Leaders ==
- Veerendra Heggade, hereditary administrator of the Dharmasthala Temple, Jain philanthropist.
- Ratnavarma Heggade, former hereditary administrator of the Dharmasthala Temple, Jain philanthropist and legislator.

== Sports ==
- Ashish Ballal, former captain of indian field hockey and Arujna awardee
- Anand Shetty, Indian athlete, known as "Flying Bunt"
- Chirag Shetty, Indian Badminton Player
- Satheesha Rai, Indian Weightlifter, olympian, Arjuna awardee
- Shodhan Rai, international bodybuilder and ekalavya awardee
- Pooja Shri Shetty, Indian Karateka
- Ashwini Akkunji, Indian athlete
- Vikrant Shetty, Indian origin Emirati cricketer
- Bravish Shetty, Indian cricketer
- Sanil Shetty, Indian table-tennis player.

== Military People ==
- Dinesh Chandra Bhandary, Vir Chakra awardee

== Politicians ==
- Gopal Shetty, Indian politician
- Ramanath Rai, Indian politician.
- B. Nagaraja Shetty, politician.
- B. Subbayya Shetty, MLA from Suratkhal constituency.
- K. K. Shetty, Member of Parliament.
- Brijesh Chowta, Member of Parliament.
- Y. Bharath Shetty, MLA from Mangalore City North constituency.
- Harish Poonja, MLA from Belthangady constituency.
- U. Rajesh Naik, MLA from Bantwal constituency.
- Ashok Kumar Rai, MLA from Puttur constituency.
- Nalin Kumar Kateel, Member of Parliament.
- Gururaj Shetty Gantihole, MLA from Byndoor constituency.
- Gurme Suresh Shetty, MLA from Kapu constituency.
- Dinakar Keshav Shetty, MLA from Kumta constituency.
- Adhur Shanker Alva, Member of Parliament.
- I. M. Jayarama Shetty, Member of Parliament.
- Raj Nayak , Melbourne, Australian Politician.
- Madhuri Balimane Nayak, Melbourne, Australian Kho-Kho World Cup player 2025 Team.
