= Shetty =

Indian surname from coastal Karnataka

Shetty (Tulu and Kannada [ʃeʈːi]) is a surname originating from coastal Karnataka state of India. It is a found among Hindu and Jain Bunts of the coastal Karnataka.

== Etymology ==
Shetty is derived from the Sanskrit word Śreṣṭha (Devanagari: श्रेष्ठ) or Śreṣṭhin (Devanagari: श्रेष्ठीन्) meaning superior, Prakritised as Seṭhī (Devanagari: सेठी), and then Śeṭ (Devanagari: शेट) or Śeṭī (Devanagari: शेटी).

== Notable people with the surname ==
Notable people with the surname Shetty, include:

- A. B. Shetty (1883–1960), Indian politician and philanthropist
- Abhilash Shetty (born 1993), Indian filmmaker, screenwriter and actor
- Adhitya Shetty (born 2004), Indian-Emirati cricketer
- Ahan Shetty (born 1995), Indian actor
- Aishani Shetty (born 1995), Indian actress and director
- Ajit Shetty (born 1946), Indian-Belgian entrepreneur
- Anand Shetty (c. 1961–2013), Indian athlete
- Anushka Shetty (born 1981), Indian actress
- Ashrita Shetty (born 1993), Indian actress
- Athiya Shetty (born 1992), Indian actress
- Avantika Shetty (born 1986), Indian actress
- B. Nagaraja Shetty, Indian politician
- B. R. Shetty (born 1942), Indian-Emirati entrepreneur
- B. Subbayya Shetty, Indian politician
- B. Vithal Shetty, American scientist
- B. Vittaldas Shetty, Indian politician
- Balkrishna Shetty (born 1950), Indian diplomat
- Bharath Shetty Y (born 1971), Indian politician
- Bharathi Shetty (born 1960), Indian politician
- Bhaskar Shetty (1964–2016), Indian businessman and murder victim
- Bhoomi Shetty (born 1998), Indian actress
- Bola Chittaranjan Das Shetty (1944–2016), Indian writer
- Bravish Shetty (born 1987), Indian cricketer
- Chandan Shetty (born 1989), Indian music artist
- Champa Shetty, Indian actress and filmmaker
- Chirag Shetty (born 1997), Indian badminton player
- Damini Kanwal Shetty, Indian actress, producer and writer
- Dayanand Shetty (born 1969), Indian actor, model and entrepreneur
- Deepak Shetty (born 1991), Indian cricketer
- Devi Shetty (born 1953), Indian philanthropist and cardiac surgeon
- Dheekshith Shetty (born 1991), Indian actor
- Emily Shetty (born 1984), American politician and attorney
- Farnaz Shetty, Indian actress
- Gopal Shetty (born 1954), Indian politician
- Gurukiran Shetty (born 1970), Indian music director
- Halady Srinivas Shetty (born 1951), Indian politician
- Hriday Shetty, Indian film director
- I. M. Jayarama Shetty (1951–2014), Indian politician
- J. V. Shetty (died 2014), Indian banker
- Jay Shetty (born 1987), British motivational speaker
- K. Amarnath Shetty (1939/1940–2020), Indian politician
- K. K. Shetty (1901–1987), Indian politician
- K. Madhukar Shetty (1971–2018), IPS officer
- K. Prathapachandra Shetty (born 1950), Indian politician
- Kalidas Shetty, Indian-American food scientist
- Kalmanje Jagannatha Shetty (1926–2015), former judge, Supreme Court of India
- Kartik Shetty (born 1987), Indian actor and director
- Kavya Shetty (born 1989), Indian actress and model
- Kedambadi Jagannath Shetty (died 2016), Indian judge
- Kobi Shetty, Australian politician
- Krithi Shetty (born 2003), Indian actress
- Likith Shetty (born 1989), Indian actor
- M. B. Shetty (1938–1982), Indian choreographer and actor
- Mahesh Shetty (born 1984), Indian actor
- Manmohan Shetty, Indian entrepreneur
- Manohar Shetty (born 1953), Indian Goa-based poet
- Megha Shetty (born 1998), Indian actress
- Mona Ghosh Shetty, Indian voice actor
- Mulki Sunder Ram Shetty (1915–1981), Indian banker
- Neetha Shetty, Indian television actress
- Neha Shetty (born 1999), Indian actress
- Niranjan Shetty (born 1980), Indian actor
- Nitya Shetty, Indian actress
- Pooja Shri Shetty (born 1990), Indian martial artist
- Prakash Shetty (born 1960), Indian cartoonist
- Pramod Shetty (born 1983), Indian actor
- R. N. Shetty (1928–2020), Indian entrepreneur, philanthropist and educationist
- Rahul Shetty, Indian dancer and choreographer
- Raj B. Shetty (born 1987), Indian actor and film director
- Raj Deepak Shetty (born 1978), Indian actor
- Rakshit Shetty (born 1983), Indian actor and film director
- Reshma Shetty (born 1977), British-American actress and singer
- Rishab Shetty (born 1983), Indian actor and film director
- Rohit Shetty (born 1974), Indian film director and stuntman
- Roopesh Shetty (born 1991), Indian actor
- Salil Shetty (born 1961), Secretary General of Amnesty International
- Sanam Shetty (born 1988), Indian actress and model
- Sanchita Shetty (born 1989), Indian actress
- Sandeep Shetty, Indian actor
- Sanil Shetty (born 1989), Indian table-tennis player
- Satish Shetty (1970–2010), Indian activist
- Shakunthala T. Shetty (born 1947), Indian politician
- Shamita Shetty (born 1979), Indian interior designer, former actress and model
- Shantharam Shetty (born 1942), Indian orthopedic surgeon
- Shashi Kiran Shetty (born 1959), Indian businessman and chairman
- Shilpa Shetty (born 1975), Indian actress
- Shine Shetty, Indian actor
- Shweta Shetty (born 1969), Indian-German based singer
- Siddakatte Chennappa Shetty (1952–2014), Indian Yakshagana artist
- Sini Shetty (born 2001), Indian model
- Sowkoor Jayaprakash Shetty (1935–2015), Indian lawyer and politician
- Srinidhi Shetty (born 1992), Indian actress and model
- Sudarshan Shetty (born 1961), Indian artist
- Suniel Shetty (born 1961), Indian actor, producer and entrepreneur
- Suresh Shetty (born 1955), Indian politician
- Trisha Shetty (born 1990), Indian activist
- V. P. Shetty, Indian banker
- Vajrang Shetty (born 1990), Indian actor
- Varuna Shetty, Indian actress
- Vikrant Shetty (born 1983), Indian-Emirati cricketer
- Vishwanath Shetty (died 2015), Indian judge and murder victim
- Yagna Shetty, Indian actress
- Yashas Shetty, Indian artist
- Yele Mallappa Shetty (1815–1887), Indian merchant and philanthropist
- Yannick Shetty (born 1995), Austrian politician
- Halady Srinivas Shetty, Indian politician, philanthropist and activist
