= Kannada Vaishya =

The Kannada Vaishya in Uttara Kannada (India) are a small sect of people. They are mainly found in Ankola and Karwar taluks of the district.

Their ancestors came from Goa and follow Konkan traditions and speak Konkani as their mother tongue every where in Maharashtra and Karnataka. They are different from other Vaishyas like Arya Vaishya, Bunt Shetty, Balija Vaishya and Baniya Vaishya's from UP and Bihar. Some are engaged in small business like preparation of beaten rice, its sale, etc. Many of them are agriculturists. Some are engaged in hotel business. They speak Konkani and Kannada languages along with Marathi in Belgaum. They worship Mahalakshmi, Mahalsa, Arya Durga and Ramanatha. They revere Banta Deva of Amdalli of Karwar Taluk. The dead are cremated. Divorce and widow marriages are not prevalent among them.
