= Ekalavya Award =

Sports and education award in India

The Ekalavya Award is given by the several state government in India, including Karnataka, Madhya Pradesh, and Haryana. The award is given to native sportspersons for outstanding performance in sports or even education by a few states like Rajasthan. The award was established in 1993, however, it is not given by every state government.

== Ekalavya Award in Karnataka ==
Karnataka Recipient	Year Awarded
Najib Aga	1994
U Sundari	1994 (Powerlifting)
Jyothi H M	Athletics 2010
Robin Uthappa	2010 (Cricket)
Amoolya Kamal	2010
Jeeva Kumar S	2010
Poojashri Venkatesh	2010
Sudhir Kumar	2010
Ganapathy Manoharan	2014 (Boxing)
Shodhan Rai	2014 (Natural Body Builder and Represented India in various International Bodybuilding Competitions)
Vishal Kumar	2014 (Football)
Nishya Joseph	2014 (Volleyball)
S.K. Uthappa	2016 (hockey)
Malaprabha Jadhav	2016 (judo)
O. Sushmitha Pawar	2016 (kabaddi)
M. Niranjan	2016 (Para Swimming)
Mamatha Poojary	2012 (Kabaddi)
KL Rahul	2020 (Cricket)
Mayank Agarwal	2020 (Cricket)
B Hariprasad	2022 (Volleyball)

== Eklavya Award in Rajasthan ==
Government of Rajasthan provide Eklavya Awards based on academic criteria and to the topper of class 10th and 12th.
