= H. V. K. Udupa =

Indian scientist, electrical engineer and educator

H. V. K. Udupa (Handady Venkata Krishna Udupa) was born on 18 October 1921 in Udupi district of Karnataka state in India (Bharat). He is a distinguished scientist in the field of electrochemical technology and electrochemistry. He was Director of Central Electrochemical Research Institute (CECRI), Karaikudi. He was emeritus scientist at CECRI and emeritus professor of chemical engineering at Manipal Institute of Technology, Manipal. He was also visiting professor to Tokyo Institute of Technology, Japan.

H. V. K. Udupa earned a PhD from Ohio State University, USA in 1950. His research area was electrochemistry. He won several HK Sen Memorial Awards from the Institution of Chemists (India) in 1979 and Federation of Indian Chambers of Commerce Industry (FICCI) awards in 1973 and 1974. He had 140 patents to his credit. He was fellow of the Indian National Science Academy (INSA), the Electrochemical Society of India, and many more. He died on 3 July 2003.
