= K. Madhukar Shetty =

Indian police officer (b. 1971, d. 2018)

Dr. K. Madhukar Shetty IPS
- ಮಧುಕರ್ ಶೆಟ್ಟಿ
- Born: 17 December 1971; Udupi district, Karnataka
- Died: 28 December 2018 (aged 47); Hyderabad, Telangana state
- Education: Jawaharlal Nehru University , Rockefeller College of Public Affairs & Policy (PhD)
- Spouse: Suvarna Cherukuri
- Parents: Vaddarse Raghuram Shetty (father); Prafulla Shetty (mother)
- Police career
- Country: Indian Police Service
- Rank: IGP (Inspector General of Police)

Dr. K. Madhukar Shetty (1971-2018) was an Indian Police Service officer of 1999 batch of Karnataka Cadre. He is remembered for working against illegal mining in Karnataka.

== Early life ==
Shetty was the son of Kannada journalist Vaddarse Raghurama Shetty. was from Tuluva Bunt community. Born on 17 December 1971, Madhukar completed his MA in Sociology from Jawaharlal Nehru University, Delhi. He earned his PhD in Public Administration from Rockefeller College of Public Affairs & Policy, University at Albany, New York.

== Police service ==
Shetty worked as ASP Bengaluru Rural district and later as SP of Chamarajanagar and Chikkamagaluru.

Shetty was an integral part of the team that exposed illegal iron ore mining in Ballari, the backyard of powerful mining baron Janardhan Reddy.

In 2006, when a group of 32 families was evicted from the Tatkola forest, allegedly on the orders of government officials, Shetty came up with the idea of allocating 64 acres of the land reclaimed from encroachers, on the edge of the Sargod Kundur reserve forest, to the families.

== Death ==
Shetty was under treatment in Continental Hospitals, Hyderabad, and died on 28 December 2018 due to serious cardiac complications. The Karnataka state government instituted an inquiry to look into the death of Dr Shetty following suspicion from his friend and family that he didn't get correct medical treatment.

National Police Academy, the apex police training academy in India, named its Main Lecture Hall for IPS trainees in 2021 Dr. K Madhukar Shetty Hall as "a mark of respect to Madhukar Shetty for his commitment, dedication and also being a role model for the IPS Probationers".
