= Balkrishna Shetty =

Indian diplomat

Personal details
- Born: 15 June 1950 (age 75) Kundapura, Karnataka, India
- Children: 2
- Profession: Diplomat

Balkrishna Shetty is a retired Indian diplomat who served as India's ambassador to Sweden, Latvia, Bahrain, Senegal and Mali

== Early life and education ==
Shetty was born in Kundapura. He completed a BSc Honours in mathematics at Presidency College, Calcutta (1970) and an M.Sc. (mathematics) at the Indian Institute of Technology, Kanpur (1972). After a period of research in mathematics at the Tata Institute of Fundamental Research, Mumbai, he joined the Indian Statistical Service in 1973 and was assistant director, dealing with industries and trade statistics in Central Statistical Organisation, Government of India, New Delhi.

== Career ==
In 1976, he joined the Indian Foreign Service. After two years of training in India, he was posted at the Permanent Mission of India in Geneva, Switzerland (1978–1981) to learn French, and thereafter to work at the Mission as Second Secretary. He was transferred to the High Commission of India in Dhaka, Bangladesh, as Second Secretary (Press and Culture) and subsequently as First Secretary, dealing with Economic and Commerce matters (1981–1984).

Shetty returned to India and was posted as under secretary to the Government of India in the Ministry of Commerce, New Delhi, from 1984 to 1986, dealing with state trading issues as well as regulation of Indian investments abroad. He was appointed deputy director general (administration) at the Indian Council for Cultural Relations, New Delhi from 1986 to 1988, and was, inter alia, involved with the Festival of India in the Soviet Union. He was posted to the Embassy of India in Moscow, Soviet Union (now Russia), from 1988 to 1991 as first secretary (political) and subsequently as counsellor (political) during the perestroika and glasnost years. He was deputy high commissioner at the High Commission of India, Singapore from 1991 to 1995 looking after, inter alia, economic, commercial and investment issues. During 1995–1997, he returned to India and headed the Technical Cooperation Division as joint secretary in the Ministry of External Affairs in New Delhi, dealing with bilateral, economic and technical cooperation and international disaster relief. He thereafter joined the Foreign Service Institute as director in charge of Professional Course for Foreign Diplomats (PCFD).

Between 1997 and 2001, he was posted at the Embassy of India in Paris, France, as minister (economic), dealing with all bilateral economic matters and relations with Organisation for Economic Co-operation and Development (OECD). He was appointed as Ambassador to the Republic of Senegal and was concurrently accredited to the Cape Verde Islands, Guinea Bissau, Mali, Mauritania and the Gambia from 2001 to 2005. He was associated with the establishment of TEAM–9 (Techno-Economic Cooperation for Africa-India Movement), a regional economic cooperation mechanism between India and eight West African countries.

From September 2005 to January 2009, he was Ambassador of India to Bahrain.

In January 2009, he was appointed the ambassador to Sweden with additional charge of Latvia and continued in this post until he retired on 16 July 2010.
