= Murder of Vishwanath Shetty =

In 2015 Vishwanath Shetty was allegedly murdered by Popular Front of India (PFI) activists. The clash started during a rally by PFI. Minister Kimmane Rathnakar gave 5 Lakh to his family. According to police, Vishwanath was allegedly stabbed by PFI activists. 56 people were arrested for violence after his murder in Gajanur village, and seven people were arrested for his murder. Villagers of Gajanur accused PFI of attacking them.
