= Anand Shetty =

Indian sprinter

Personal information
- Nickname: Flying Bunt
- Nationality: Indian
- Born: c. 1961
- Died: 21 May 2013 (aged 51–52) Mangalore, Dakshina Kannada, Karnataka, India

Sport
- Country: India
- Sport: Track and field
- Events: 100 meters, 200 meters
Medal record
Men's Athletics
Representing India
South Asian Games
Gold medal – first place	1984 Kathmandu	200 m
Gold medal – first place	1987 Calcutta	100 m

Anand Shetty (c. 1961 – 21 May 2013) was an Indian athlete who specialized in sprints. He was a nine-time national champion in the 100 metres and 200 metres events between 1982 and 1989.

== Career ==
Son of a Kambala Jockey, and himself a Jockey in teens, Anand Shetty started his career in sports initially as a Kabaddi player and eventually turned into sprints. He made his first senior appearance at the international level in the 1982 Asian Games in New Delhi. In the South Asian Games, he won gold medals in the 200 metres event in Kathmandu in 1984 and in the 100 metres event in Calcutta in 1987. He won gold medals in the 100 metres and 200 metres seniors' national events in 1982 in Delhi and went on to retain the titles in Jamshedpur in 1983. In total, he held the records nine times till 1989. He was given the Rajyotsava award in 1991 for his contribution to sports.

== Death ==
Anand Shetty was seriously injured in a car accident on 18 May 2013 and succumbed to the injuries on 21 May at the KMC Hospital in Mangalore.
