= B. Vithal Shetty =

American scientist

Bola Vithal Shetty (Dr.) is an India born American scientist who developed Metolazone and was associated with the Food and Drug Administration agency.
