= A. B. Shetty =

Indian politician, philanthropist, entrepreneur, and bank founder

Attavar Balakrishna Shetty
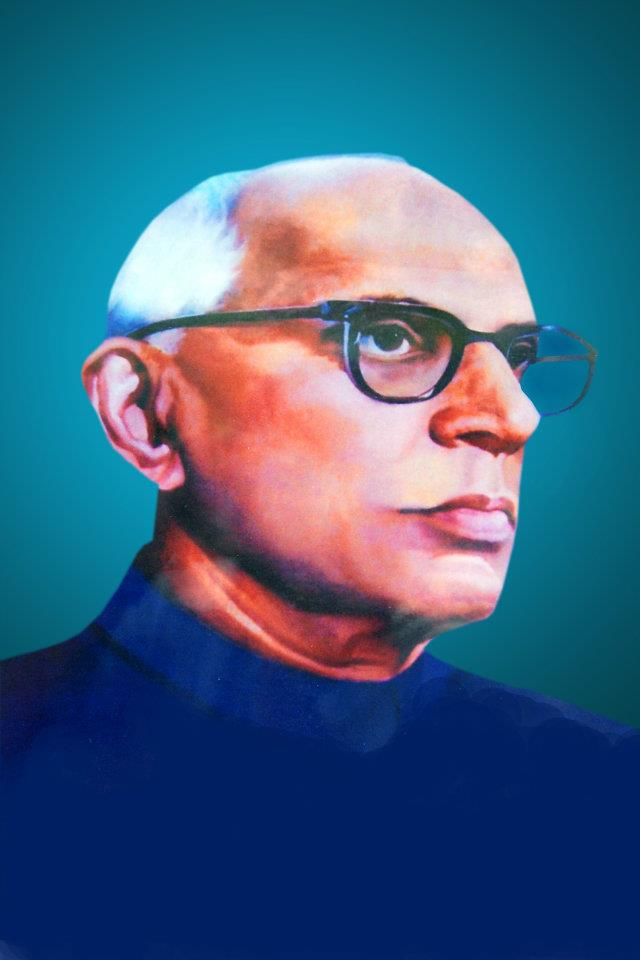

Minister for Health Co-operation, Housing and Ex-servicemen, Government of Madras State

Personal details
- Party: Indian National Congress
- Known for: Founder of Vijaya Bank

Attavar Balakrishna Shetty (1883–1960), better known as A. B. Shetty was an Indian politician, philanthropist, entrepreneur and the founder of Vijaya Bank.

== Biography ==
Shetty was born in a Tulu-speaking family of landlords to Mulki Kalappa Shetty (Father) and Attavar Unhakke (Mother) in Karnataka. He completed his early education in Mangalore. Realising the need for dissemination of news and information about world affairs among people in the South Canara district, he started a weekly Kannada language publication, called "Navayuga", which was edited in its early years by K. K. Shetty and later by K. Honnayya Shetty. This was very popular for more than 40 years. In addition Shetty was also the pioneer behind Canara Printing Press, a printing press in Mangalore.

Shetty established Vijaya Bank in 1931 at Bunts Hostel in Mangalore. The bank did well, providing job opportunities for thousands of youths and also providing banking service to lakhs of people all over the country. Vijaya Bank is today one of the foremost nationalised banks of India. Deeply secular and progressive in outlook, Shetty was interested in the activities of the Theosophical Society, the Brahmo Samaj, the Arya Samaj, the Depressed Classes Mission, etc., all of which were engaged in the uplift of neglected sections of society. He also served as Minister in the Madras Presidency and later in Madras State, holding various portfolios such as agriculture and veterinary, medical and public health, cooperation, housing and ex-servicemen between the years 1949-1956 until quitting the Ministry on 1 March 1956 following the States Reorganisation Act of 1956.

He married Kalyani Shetty. They had four children: two sons and two daughters. He died in 1960 at the age of 77 and is commemorated by the A.B.Shetty Memorial Institute of Dental Sciences, Deralakatte, Mangalore.
