= Vittal Rai =

Vittal Rai (25 October 1935 – 19 December 1995) was an Indian scientist, professor and administrator. He was the fourth Vice-Chancellor of the University of Agricultural Sciences, Dharwad (1991–1994). His scientific specialism was bio-fertilisers and he authored a significant number of books based on his research.

Among the many honours he received was a Chief Minister's Rajyotsava Award in 1994.

== Early life and education ==
Vittal Rai was born into a Tulu-speaking family at Palthad, a small village near Puttur in South Canara (present-day Dakshina Kannada) district. He was the second of three children born to N. Jathappa Rai and Palthad Shubravathi Rai. His father died when he was three years old.

Rai's primary education was at Primary Board High School in Bellare. He did his college education in Aloysius College, Mangalore. He then went on to the University of Agricultural Sciences, Dharwad, where he completed his bachelor's degree in agriculture. He did postgraduate studies in plant microbiology from the same university then proceeded to the United States, where he completed a second postgraduate degree in ecology and his doctoral studies in plant pathology.

== Career ==
Rai started his career as an associate professor at the Montana State University, Montana, US. After working in the US for five years and living there for 13 years, he decided to move back to India in 1973.

In India, Rai was offered several jobs in banks and other corporations, but he chose to teach at the University of Agricultural Science in Bangalore as an associate professor. He was promoted to Professor and Head of the Microbiology Department in 1978 and held the position till he retired in 1995.

He was also appointed as the Vice Chancellor of University of Agricultural Sciences, Dharwad, from November 1991 to November 1994.

== Personal life ==
Rai was married to Lavanya, daughter of Ullipady Ramnath Marla and Kumudhini Marla, in 1968. The marriage was a traditional Indian arranged marriage. They had two sons their names were Vihar Ramnath and Vikas Jathappa. He had two grand children named Viana Sharla and Vidhan Balvit.
