= Dinker Belle Rai =

Indian American surgeon

Dinker B. Rai
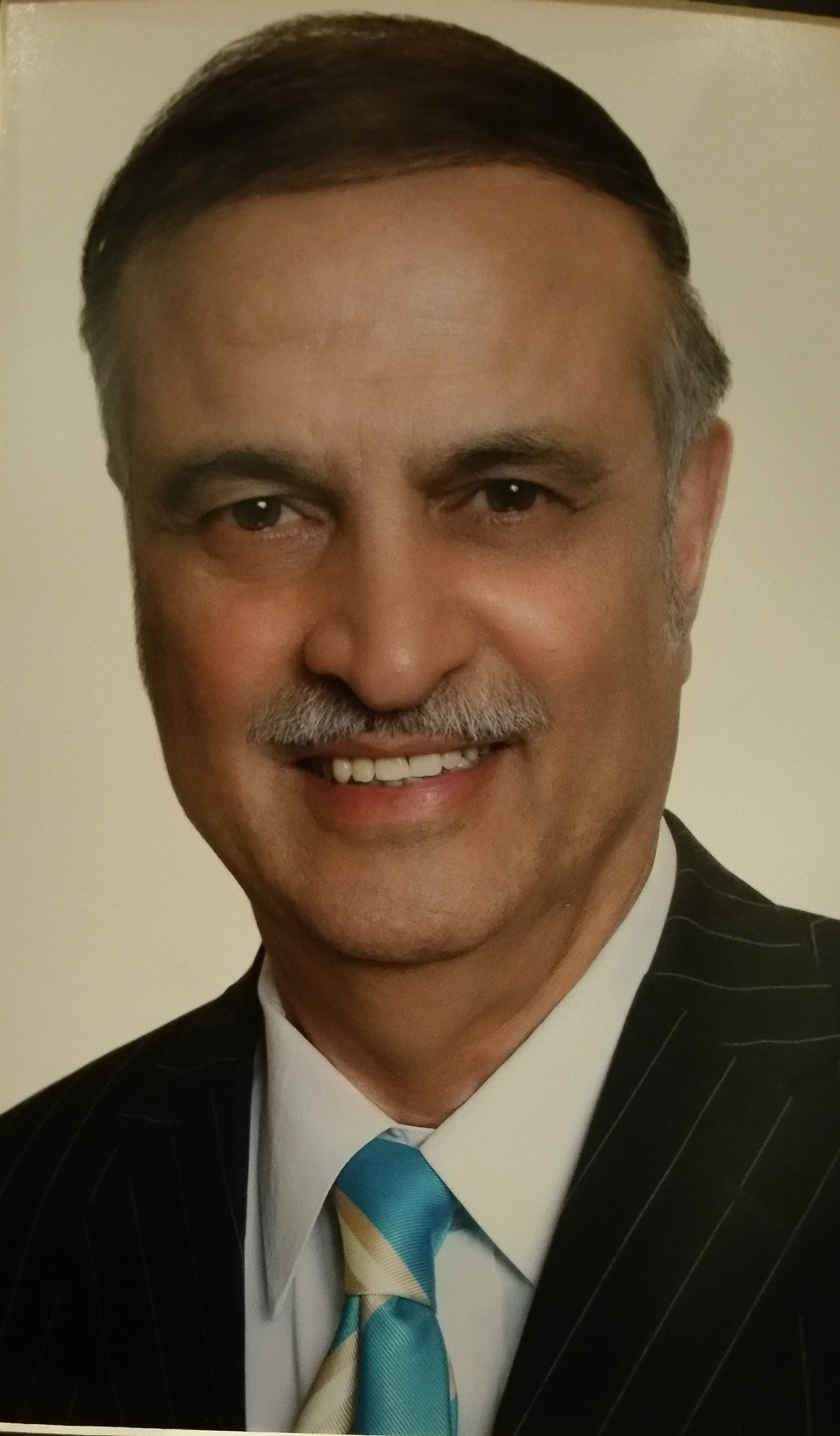
- Born: 28 April 1947; Puttur, Mangalore, Karnataka State, India
- Education: Bangalore Medical College, St. Aloysius College, Brooklyn Jewish Hospital and Medical Center, Maimonides Medical Center
- Spouse: Shakila Rai
- Children: Seema, Arjun, Rahul
- Awards: Jewel of India of NRI’s Of North America by Manish Media, New York State Assembly Certificate of Merit, A. Vann, Member of Assembly

Dinker Belle Rai is an Indian American vascular surgeon who serves as the chairman of the Department of Surgery and as the Chief of the Department of Vascular Surgery / Vascular Laboratory at the Interfaith Medical Center, Brooklyn, New York. He is a visiting clinical professor at the Health & Science Center of the State University of New York in Brooklyn and a visiting professor at the Rajiv Gandhi University in Bangalore, India. Rai is a Fellow of the American College of Surgeons and a Fellow of the Royal Canadian College of Surgeons.

He is credited with developing the first ever method for retrograde catheterization of the venous tree. This invention was given a United States patent in 1988. Based on this patent, a company called The Ideas For Medicine, Inc. (now part of Horizon Medical Products, Inc.) manufactured and still distributes out a series of catheters, known as Rai’s Catheters, for use in performing descending phlebographic tests and for venous embolectomies. He is also credited with the discovery of the motion of venous valves in human beings.

His original research on histopathological specimens of patients with saphenofemoral – incompetency resulted in a paradigm shift in management of varicose veins. He performed the first ever vein transplantation below the knee. The discovery of the right atrial mechanical function is a pivotal discovery in his medical research work.

He is an editor for the International Journal of Angiology. Rai has been featured in the book "Jewels of India" for his contributions to medicine, art, sports and cultural arenas.

== Early and personal life ==
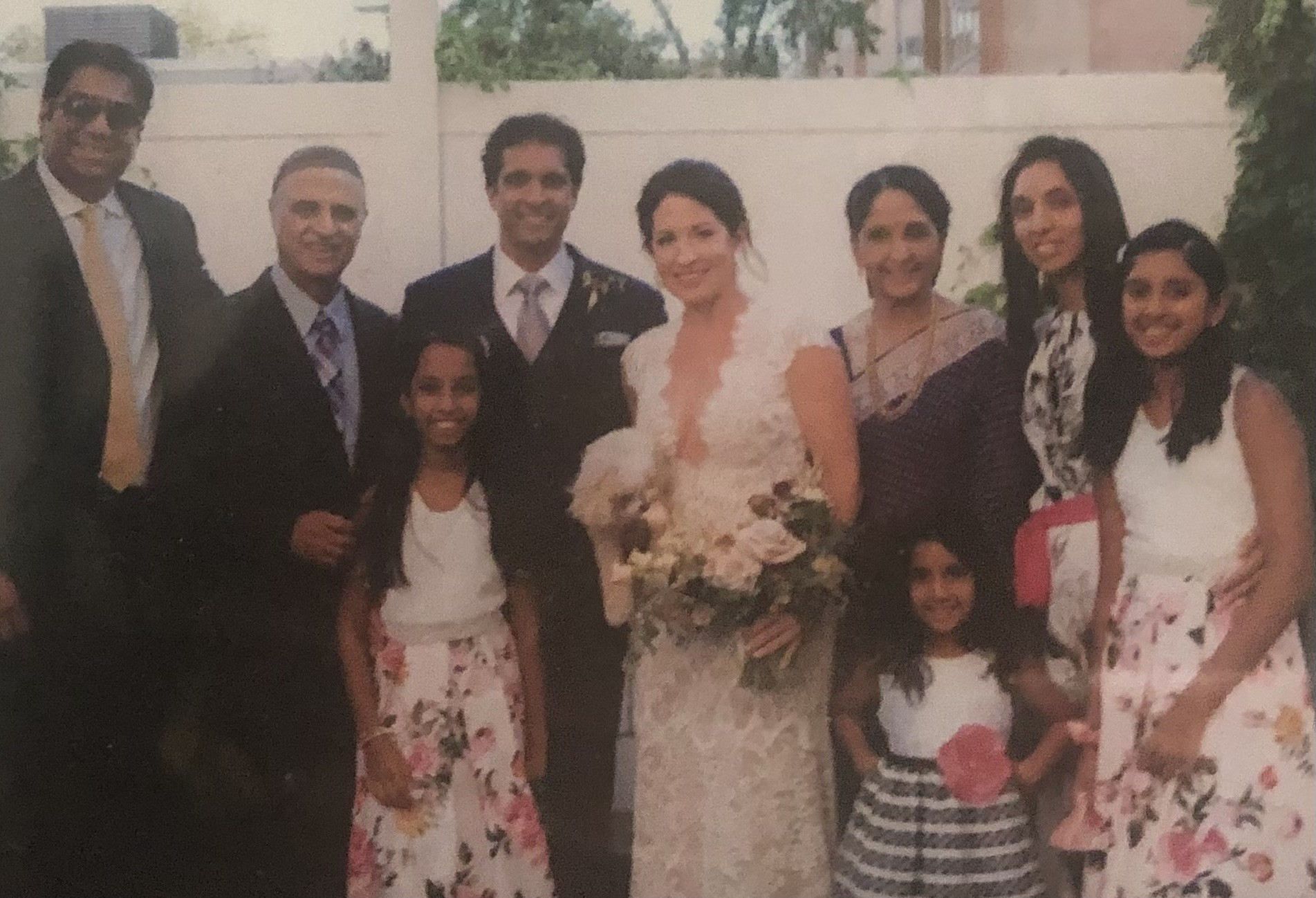
Dinker B. Rai with his family

Rai was born in Puttur, Karnataka, India into a Tuluva family on 28 April 1947 to Kedambady Narayana Rai, a famous criminal lawyer practicing in Mangalore and Belle Sanjivi Rai. He spent his early childhood in Mangalore and studied at St. Aloysius School and College. During his school days, he represented Mysore State in school cricket games. A portrait he painted of the then-US President John F. Kennedy during his school days is displayed at the John F. Kennedy Presidential Library and Museum in Boston, Massachusetts. He currently lives in Old Westbury, Long Island, New York, with his wife, Shakila Rai, and their three children.

== Education ==
Rai did his schooling at St. Aloysius School Mangalore from 1952 to 1963. He completed his pre-university degree from St. Aloysius College Mangalore in 1964. After finishing pre-university, he attended the Bangalore Medical College. He graduated from Bangalore Medical College with a distinction in Pathology and as captain of an All Indian Regional University Cricket team (South Zone). He was awarded the "Best Outgoing Sportsman and Student of the Year" award for the academic year 1969–70. After completing his M.B.B.S (Bachelor of Medicine and Bachelor of Surgery) from Bangalore Medical College India, he was a rotating Intern at Victoria Hospital Bangalore, India from 1970 to 1971.

== Career ==
He did his surgical training in the General Surgery Residency training program at the Brooklyn Jewish Hospital and Medical Center of New York from 1974 to 1977, Chief Residency in Surgery in 1977 to 1978 and Fellowship in Vascular Surgery specializing in venous diseases at Maimonides Medical Center, Brooklyn, New York in 1979. He served as the Director of the Phlebology Society of America in 1989. He participated in the first ever historical strike by the resident doctors of New York to reform the working conditions of New York while under training. The historical strike changed the Medical Residency working conditions throughout the country.

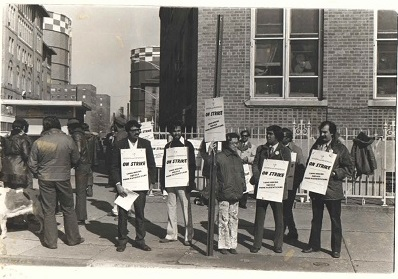
Rai (second from left) participating with resident doctors of New York in a historical strike to reform their working conditions

He has received the following certifications:

- Certified by the Canadian Board of Surgery (1980).
- Fellow of Royal College of Surgeons Canada (1980).
- Certified by the American Board of Surgery (1981). Recertified (1991, 2002).
- Fellow of American College of Surgeons (1983).
- Fellow of the Phlebology Society of America (1986).
- Field Liaison Fellow of American Cancer Society (1986).
- Fellow of the International College of Surgeons (1987).
- Fellow of the American Venous Forum (1991).
- Fellow of the International College of Angiology (1991).

He has been a member of:

- The Brooklyn/Long Island Chapter of American College of Surgeons (1981).
- The Brooklyn Surgical Society (1986).

He has held the following positions at the Jewish Medical Center now known as Interfaith Medical Center:

- Chairman of the Cancer Committee (1983).
- Member of the Infectious Disease Committee (1984–present).
- Member of the Medical Executive Committee (1985–present).
- Treasurer of the Medical Executive Committee (1989-1993).
- Member of the Operative Committee (1990–present).
- Member of the Cancer Committee (1992–present).
- The President of the Medical Staff (1993-1997).
- Member of the Quality Assurance Committee (1993–present).
- Member of the Pharmacy Committee (1993–present).
- Chairman of the QA Committee, Department of Surgery.

Rai serves on the Interdisciplinary Advisory Board for the Journal of Cutaneous and Aesthetic Surgery. He is an Editorial Board Member of the International College of Angiology Journal and Tracks Journal and is on the Board of Directors of the Phlebology Society of America.

He has authored the “Manual of Sclerotherapy and Phlebectomy of Varicose Veins and Telangiectasias for New Practitioners” published by Indian Association of Dermatologists, Venereologists and Leprologists, Bangalore Chapter in 2006. He has contributed the following two chapters to the "Textbook of Angiology", published by Springer Verlag, 2000 Textbook of Angiology. Springer. 2012. pp. 1360 pages. ISBN 9781461211907.

- Chronic Venous Insufficiency Disease: Etiology and Treatment.
- Descending Phlebography.

== Surgical techniques and inventions ==
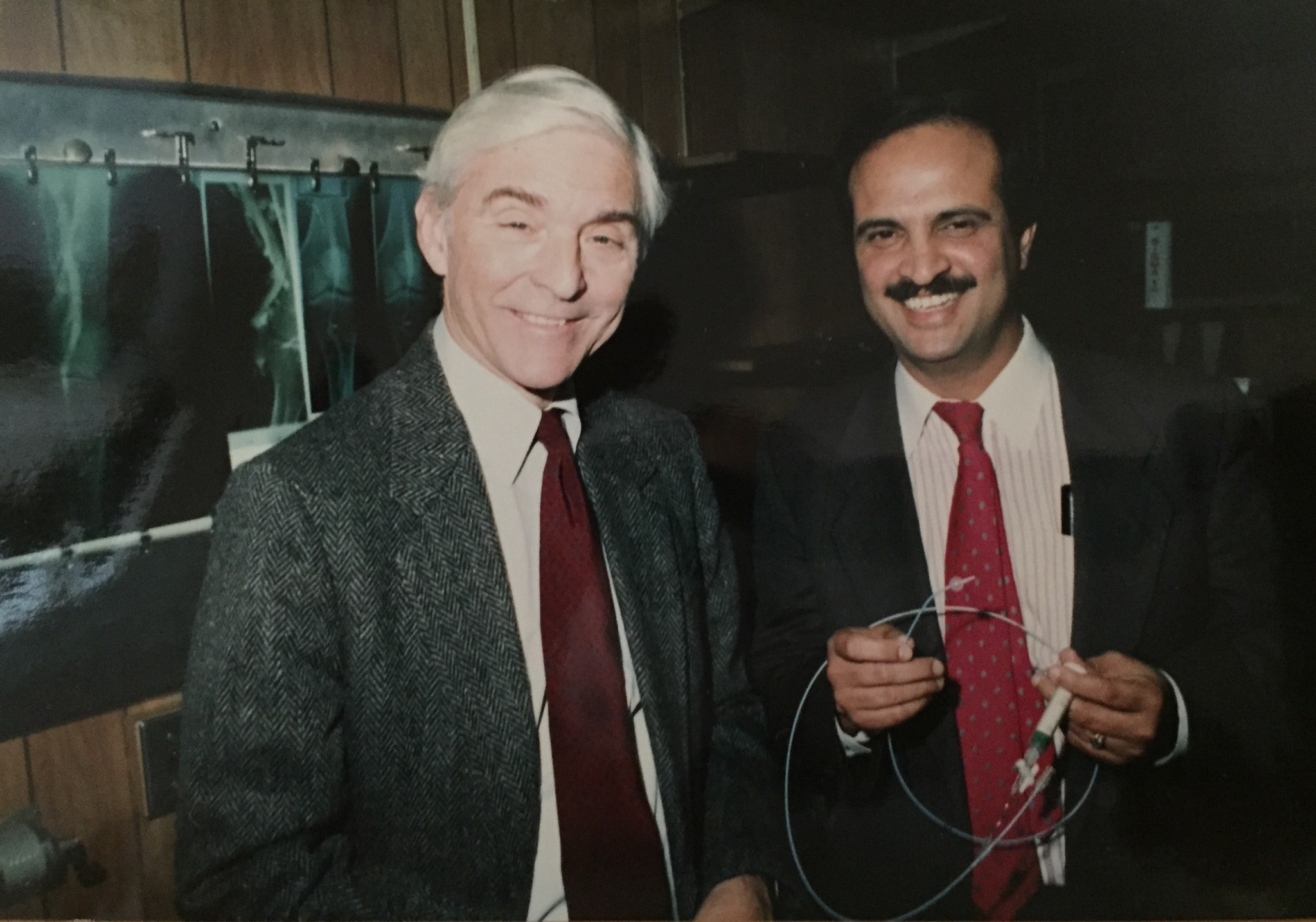
Earl U. Bell of national news channel CBS interviewing Rai about Vein Valve transplantation surgery & invention of Rai's Catheter

Patent showing method to catheterize venous tree in retrograde fashion

Rai is a pioneer in chronic venous disease research. He implemented new techniques for descending phlebography to diagnose venous disease. He devised a surgical procedure for vein valve transplantation and a surgical procedure for venous embolectomy. He also invented a diagnostic test for venous hemodynamics. He created a surgical technique for small vessel anastomosis in arterial surgery and vein patch arterioplasty. Earl U. Bell of the national news channel CBS interviewed him about vein valve transplant surgery and his invention, the Rai’s Catheter.

- Invention of Catheters: Rai is credited with creating the following catheters
  - The Rai’s catheter for percutaneous extremity approach
  - The Rai’s three lumen balloon catheter – for groin approach
  - The Rai’s “J” tip catheter – for groin approach
  - The Rai’s antegrade venous embolectomy catheter
  - The Rai’s retrograde venous embolectomy catheter

NOTE: Catheters a, b and c are used in the diagnosis of venous disease to perform descending phlebography.

- He displayed his Venogram Catheter at the 5th European American meeting for venous disease, Vienna, 1990, American College of Surgeons, San Francisco, 1990, Society for Clinical Vascular Surgery, New York City, 1989 and the American College of Surgery, Atlanta, 1989.
- Rai's videotapes on these surgical procedures is available in the American College of Surgeon Education Library: Infragenicular Arterial Reconstruction (15 minutes). He also has videotapes on Vein Valve transplantation - A New Technique (15 minutes), Descending Phlebography – Pericarpal Subcutaneous Approach (15 minutes), Venous Embolectomy – A New Technique (15 minutes).

== New discoveries ==
Rai discovered the motion of venous valves in human beings i.e. its rhythmical opening and closing during each cardiac beat. This new information on venous valves comes almost 500 years after discovery by Fabricus Acquapedente of Padua University that venous valves are one way doors allowing blood to go towards the heart.

He discovered that venous blood flow is pulsatile which, prior to Rai's discovery, was described only as linear flow.

He is best known for his discovery of the mechanical function of atrial chambers of the heart. With experimental evidence on the canine heart, he discovered that atrial diastole is the key force that creates a negative pressure that brings blood back to the heart. Diastole is an - active expansion of the muscle on which the cardiac return depends. This is an addition to Starling’s law of muscle contraction that muscle not only actively contracts but expands as well. This significant historic discovery was made approximately 500 years after Sir William Harvey's discovery of the mechanical function of Ventricular Systole. This discovery has opened doors for new understanding / treatment of heart failure, atrial fibrillation and in improving the design and functioning of prosthetic hearts.

== Sports career ==
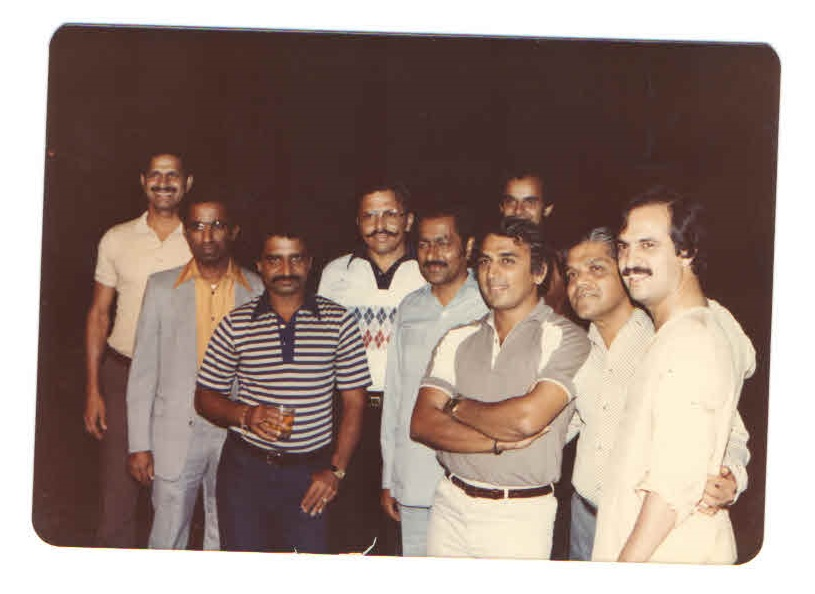
Dinker Rai posing with old cricket mates Sunil Gavaskar, G.R. Vishwanath and friend Padmasree Manmohan Attavar

Rai captained the Bangalore University cricket team that won the South Zone finals and that, for the first time, went all way to the All India finals in 1969. He captained the Combined Universities Cricket team of the South Zone of India and Sri Lanka in 1969. He was selected for the Karnataka Ranji Trophy team in 1970. In lieu of his contribution to cricket, his name is on the Honor Roll at the Chinnaswamy Stadium Cricket Museum in Bangalore.

He is an avid golfer.

== Artistic work ==
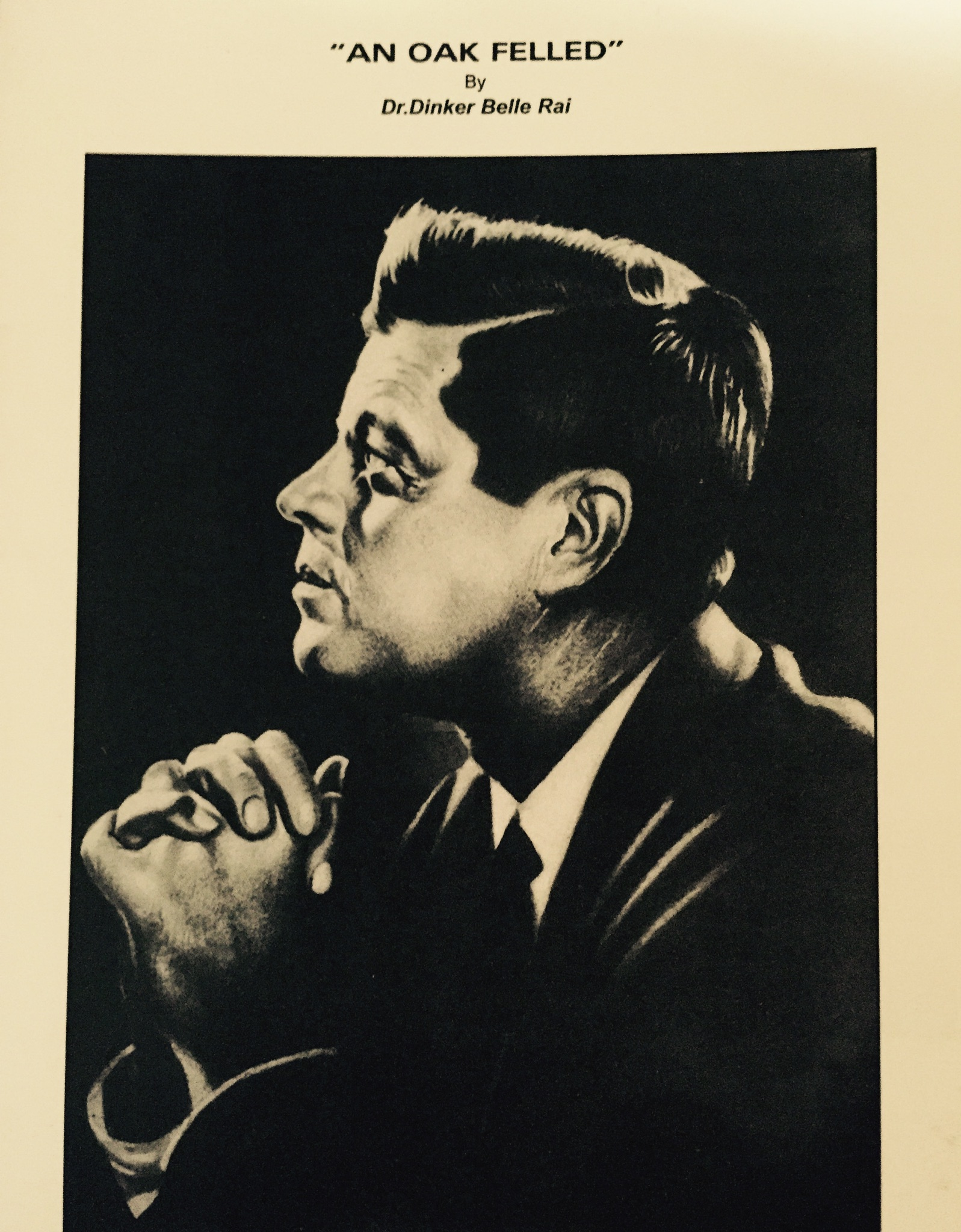
Indian Ink Wash Work Portrait of President Kennedy by Dinker B Rai

Under the guidance of Indian artist B. Gulam Mahammad, Rai learnt the "India Ink Wash work" technique using a brush. The portrait he made of then US President John F. Kennedy was based on a photograph by Yousef Karsh.

== Cultural work ==
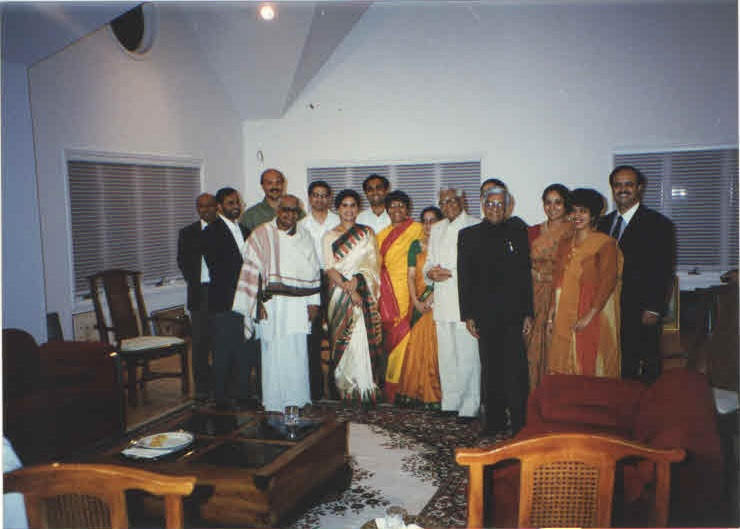
With Indian President R. Venkataraman

Rai has also served on the Board and as the Chairman of the Bharatiya Vidya Bhavan United States. He has contributed various articles to the Bhavans Journal - A Travellers Experience, Goddess Kali, Mystery of Om, Gita The Gospel of Krishna, Lingering Feelings, Conversations with Swami Bua, Masters of all Masters, salutations to Sage Kapila, Patanjali’s Ashtanga Yoga. Under his chairmanship, the Bharatiya Vidhya Bhavan (US) conducted conferences on Ayurveda, Vedic Astrology conference, and Bhagavad Gita. He is a founding member of American Academy of Ayurvedic Medicine, Inc. (AAAM).

== Recognition and awards ==
- Interfaith Spirit Award for Excellence in patient Care, 2001
- Certificate of Recognition, New York State Assembly, Darryl C. Towns
- Certificate of Special Congressional Recognition, June 2001
- City Council Citation, Annette M. Robinson, Council Member
- City Council Citation, Gray, L. B. Council Member
- Certificate of Recognition, New York State Senator, Mary Markowitz
- New York State Assembly Certificate of Merit, A. Vann, Member of Assembly
- Certificate of Recognition, New York State Senator, V. Montgomery
- Certificate of Appreciation, Interfaith Medical Center Auxiliary, 7 June 2001
