= Ashish Ballal =

Indian field hockey player (born 1970)

Ashish Kumar Ballal
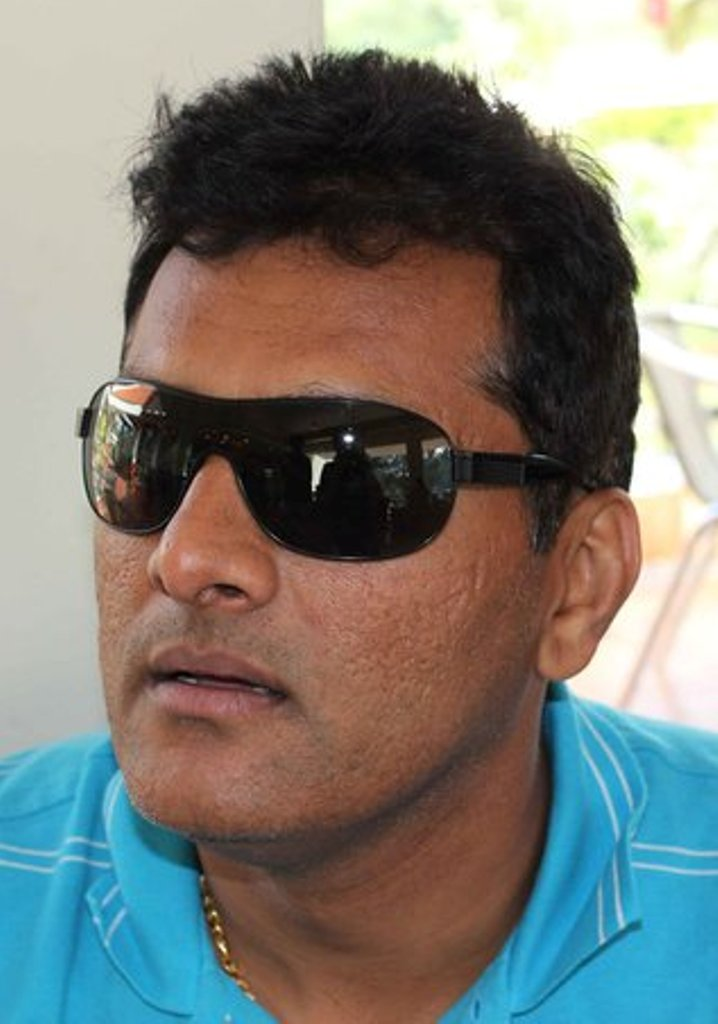

Personal information
- Born: 8 October 1970 (age 55) Bombay, Maharashtra, India

Sport
- Sport: Field hockey
- Position: Goalkeeper
Senior career
Years	Team	Caps	Goals
–	Indian Airlines	-	-
National team
Years	Team	Caps	Goals
–	India		-
Medal record
Men's field hockey
Representing India
Asian Games
Silver medal – second place	1994 Hiroshima	Team
Gold medal – first place	1998 Bangkok	Team
Asia Cup
Silver medal – second place	1989 Delhi	Team
Silver medal – second place	1994 Hiroshima	Team

Ashish Kumar Ballal (born 8 October 1970) is a former Indian goalkeeper of field hockey. He represented India in 275 international matches in the 1992 Barcelona Olympics, the 1990 World cup, 3 Champions Trophy tournaments (1989, 1993, 1996), 2 Asian Games (1994, 1998) and 2 Asia Cups (1989, 1993). Ballal became a household name in India when he saved two tie-breaker goals in the 1998 Bangkok Asian Games final against South Korea. India, captained by Ballal, went on to win the Asiad hockey gold at Bangkok after a gap of 32 years.

Ballal was bestowed with the Arjuna Award in 1997 by the Government of India and the Eklavya Award in 2000 by the government of Karnataka. He coaches hockey players of India. H runs the Ashish Ballal Hockey Academy in Bangalore.

== Personal life ==
Ballal hails from the Bunt community and is married to Sahana. He is a father to two sons, Vansh Ballal and Yash Ballal.
