= Prakash Shetty =

Indian cartoonist and caricaturist (born 1960)

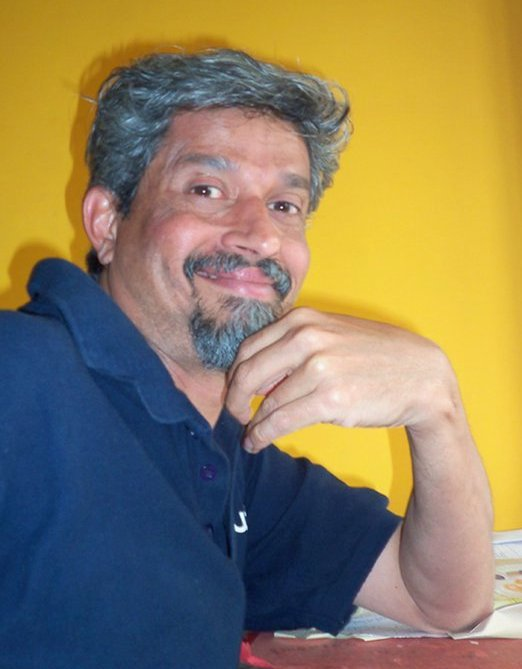
- Born: 1 April 1960 (age 66)
- Occupation: Cartoonist

Prakash Shetty is an Indian cartoonist and caricaturist known for his Spot caricaturing.

== Personal life ==
Prakash Shetty was born in Mangalore, Karnataka on 1 April 1960. He earned a degree in Bachelor of Arts.

== Career ==
He started drawing cartoons at the age of 15. He started his career with a Kannada magazine called Santhosha (later renamed as Dukha) and an English daily called The Times Of Deccan and Myru Kannada Daily. He settled as cartoonist with The Week. Kitoo (one of his creations) is a comic serial with a boy as the main character. It has been published in multiple magazines for 15 years. He joined The Week as a cartoon illustrator in 1990's and resigned and came out in 2001.

He worked as an independent spot caricaturist and freelancer. He edited a cartoon humor magazine called 'Ooshaan Thaadikaarante Myru'in Kannada language for a while. His cartoons were published in the book of Indian Cartoonists. From 2001 to 2012 did spot caricaturing events travelling all over India and abroad. His cartoons are famous for portraying the facts without fear. He follows a different type of caricature style where the person's unique characters and visualised on to the drawings
