= Dinesh Chandra Bhandary =

Indian military officer (1934–2021)

- Born: 4 August 1934 Mulki, British India
- Died: 20 January 2021 (aged 86)
- Allegiance: India
- Branch: Indian Air Force
- Rank: Group Captain
- Known for: Indo-Pakistani War of 1971 service
- Battles: Indo-Pakistani War of 1971
- Awards: Vir Chakra

Dinesh Chandra Bhandary (4 August 1934 – 20 January 2021) was a Group Captain in the Indian Air Force who was awarded the Vir Chakra, The third highest military decoration in India for the services rendered by him during the Indo-Pakistani War of 1971. He originally hailed from an aristocratic Bunt family of Kolnadu Pademane of Mulki, India.
