= Shodhan Rai =

Indian bodybuilder

- Born: Shodhan Rai; 25 December; Bangalore, India
- Education: KLE Society, Bangalore University
- Occupations: Natural Pro BodyBuilder, Internationally Certified Fitness Consultant
- Family: J N Rai, Maya Rai, Shweth Rai
- Awards: Ekalavya Award 2013, INBA 'Hall of Fame'

Shodhan Rai (born 25 December) is an internationally acclaimed Natural Bodybuilder from Mangalore. He was awarded the Ekalavya Award for sports in 2014 by the Government of Karnataka. He is also an internationally certified fitness consultant.

He has represented India in various International Natural Bodybuilding Competitions.

== Awards ==
Ekalavya Award for sports in 2014 by Government of Karnataka Winner of "Ekalavya Award 2013", highest honours by the Karnataka Govt. for a sportsperson.

- ‘HALL OF FAME’ by INBA PNBA World Natural Bodybuilding Association (naturalbodybuilding.com) in 2024 in Las Vegas, U.S.A.

- 1 X SILVER, 1 x BRONZE at Natural Olympia 2025, Las Vegas, U.S.A.
- 1 x GOLD, 2 x SILVER at the World Cup 2025, Los Angeles, U.S.A.
- 2 x SILVER at the Natural Universe 2025, Buenos Aires, Argentina.
- 3 x GOLD at the Asia Pacific 2025, Tokyo, Japan.
- 1 x BRONZE, 2 x 4th place at Natural Olympia 2024, Las Vegas, U.S.A.
- 1 x GOLD, 2 x SILVER, 1 x BRONZE at the World Cup 2024, Los Angeles, U.S.A.
- 4 x GOLD, 1 x SILVER at the International Natural Championships 2024, Auckland, New Zealand.
- BRONZE at Natural Olympia 2023, Las Vegas, U.S.A.
- 2 x GOLD, 1 x SILVER at the Natural World Cup 2023, Los Angeles, U.S.A.
- SILVER, BRONZE, 2 x 4th at the International Pacific Rim 2023, Auckland, New Zealand.
- GOLD at the Natural World Cup 2022, Los Angeles, U.S.A.
- 7th at the Natural Olympia 2022, Las Vegas, U.S.A.
- BRONZE at the Natural Olympia 2019, Las Vegas, U.S.A.
- SILVER at the Natural Universe 2019, Los Angeles, U.S.A.
- 2 x GOLD, 1 x SILVER, BEST POSER at the Natural World Cup 2019, Sydney, Australia.
- BRONZE at the Natural Olympia 2018, Las Vegas, U.S.A.
- SILVER at the Natural Universe 2018, Brisbane, Australia.
- BRONZE at the Natural Olympia 2017, Las Vegas, U.S.A.
- GOLD at the Natural World Cup 2017, Los Angeles, U.S.A.
- GOLD at the Natural Universe 2017, Auckland, New Zealand.
- SILVER at the Natural Olympia 2016, Las Vegas, U.S.A.
- 7th at the Natural World 2016, Budapest, Hungary.
- 8th at the Natural Olympia 2015, Las Vegas, U.S.A.
- 8th at the Natural World 2015, Dubai, U.A.E.
- 6th at the Natural Olympia 2014, San Diego, U.S.A.
- 8th at the Natural Olympia 2013, San Diego, U.S.A.
- 6th at the Musclemania 2013, Las Vegas, U.S.A.
- 5th at the Natural Olympia 2012, Reno, U.S.A.
- Represented India at the Musclemania 2012, Las Vegas, U.S.A.
- SILVER at the Asia Pacific 2012, Auckland, New Zealand.
- 8th at the Mr.Universe 2011, Hamburg, Germany.
- 6th at the Asia Pacific 2011, Boracay Island, Philippines.
- SILVER at the Asia Pacific 2010, Rarotonga, Cook Islands, New Zealand.
- SILVER at the Asia Pacific 2009, Christchurch, New Zealand.
- 8th at the Mr.World 2008, Athens, Greece.
- 7th at the Indo-Pak 2004, Islamabad, Pakistan.
- BRONZE at the Mr. Universe 2001 (U-21), Charney les Macon, France.
- Winner of Mr.India, Mr.Karnataka in the category/class.
- Winner of Mr.Bangalore 2001.
- Winner of Mr. Bangalore University, 2001 and 2002.
