= Kayyar Kinhanna Rai =

Indian poet and activist (1915–2015)

Kayyara Kinhanna Rai
- Born: 29 March 1915; Kayyar, Madras Presidency, British India
- Died: 9 August 2015 (aged 100); Badiyadka, Kerala, India
- Occupations: Novelist, essayist, journalist, Teacher, Farmer
- Writing career
- Period: 1915-2015
- Notable works: Srimukha, Ikyagaana, Punarnava, Shathamanada Gaana, Makkala Padya Manjari, Koraga

Kayyara Kinhanna Rai (8 June 1915 – 9 August 2015) was an Indian independence activist, author, poet, journalist, teacher and farmer.

== Early life ==
Rai was born on 8 June 1915 to Duggappa and Deyyakka Rai in a Tulu-speaking Bunt family. His given Tulu name includes the palatal nasal consonant '𑎛'/'ಞ', which is very rarely used in written Kannada today, and is absent in the English alphabet, often leading to various other transliterations of his given name such as Kinyanna and Kinnanna. Rai first learned Kannada in school. Later he published his first handwritten journal, Susheela, at the age of 12. He was influenced by Mahatma Gandhi and also participated in the freedom movement of India. During this period he married Unhakke and is a father to eight children.

== Career ==
Rai started his career as a secondary school teacher. He also delved into journalism and contributed his writings to newspapers like Swabhimana, Madras Mail and The Hindu. He received the National Award for Best Teacher in 1969. He is a writer and poet who has written books on theatre, grammar and children. Some of his famous poems are Shreemukha, Aikyagana, Punarnava, Chethana and Koraga. He has written a biography of Govinda Pai, the Kannada poet from whom he was highly influenced. His other important works are Malayala Sahitya Charithre (History of Malayalam literature), which is a translation of an original work by P. K. Parameshwaran Nair and Sahithya Drushti. He was conferred an honorary doctorate by Mangalore University in 2005. He also chaired the 66th Akhila Kannada Sahitya Sammelana (Kannada Literature Conference), which was held at Mangalore. Some of his poems have been used as songs for the Kannada film, Paduvaaralli Pandavaru (Kannada: ಪಡುವಾರಳ್ಳಿ ಪಾಂಡವರು) which was directed by Puttanna Kanagal. In 1980 he also stood for elections in Kasargod to the Kerala Legislative Assembly but was unsuccessful.

Rai was also an avid agriculturist and was active in the cultivation of areca, rubber and rice.

== Later life ==
Rai was a campaigner for the merger of Kasaragod district into Karnataka. One of his main goals was to seek the implementation of the Mahajan Committee Report, which urged the inclusion of the northern part of Kasaragod district (to the north of the Chandragiri river) into Karnataka. He founded the Kasargod Merger Action Council (Kasaragod Vileeneekarana Kriya Samithi) in 2002 to work towards this goal. Describing the goals of this council Rai said that the linguistic minorities in the district were not against the Malayalis or Kerala State, per se, but were demanding the implementation of the Justice Mahajan Commission report, vis-a-vis the fulfilment of promises made by the former Chief Ministers, E. M. S. Namboodiripad, C. Achutha Menon and Pattam Thanu Pillai, in this regard.

Rai had a natural death from old age at his residence at Kallakalia near Badiyadka, Kasaragod, Kerala at the age of 100.

== Awards ==
Some of the awards and honours that Rai has received include:

- Karnataka Sahitya Academy award – 1969
- National Award for Best Teacher – 1969
- Honorary Fellowship by Manipal Academy of Higher Education (1970).
- President – 67th Akhila Bharatha Kannada Sahitya Sammelana held in Mangalore in 1998
- Pejawar Award in literature – 2004
- Alva's Nudisri Award – 2005
- Adarsha Ratna Award – 2006
- Nadoja (Teacher of the State) Award – 2006
- Karnataka Ekikarana (Unification) Award – 2007
- Honorary Fellowship by the Kannada Sahitya Parishat – 2009
- 1st Karnataka Gadinada Ratna Award
- Pampa award

== Quotes ==
- "Benki biddide namma manege ... O bega banni, Kannadada gadi kayona banni, Kannadada nudi kaypona banni" – ("Our house is on fire ... Oh come fast, let's safeguard the boundaries of Kannada, let's save the Kannada language")
- "Language and culture transcend geographical barriers and people who want to disseminate culture and language are not bound by borders."
- "It is meaningless for the Karnataka Government to observe Suvarna Karnataka [the Golden Jubilee of the formation of the state of Karnataka] if the problems faced by the State are not solved."
