= Bravish Shetty =

Indian cricketer (born 1987)

Personal information
- Full name: Bravish Ratnakar Shetty
- Born: 27 October 1987 (age 39); Bombay, Maharashtra, India
- Source: ESPNcricinfo, 28 September 2018

Bravish Shetty (born 27 October 1987) is an Indian cricketer. He made his List A debut on 27 February 2014, for Mumbai in the 2013–14 Vijay Hazare Trophy. He made his first-class debut for Mumbai in the 2014–15 Ranji Trophy on 7 December 2014.

Ahead of the 2018–19 Ranji Trophy, he transferred from Mumbai to Tripura. He was the leading run-scorer for Tripura in the 2018–19 Vijay Hazare Trophy, with 256 runs in seven matches.
