= V. P. Shetty =

Indian banker

Vaddarse Prabhankar Shetty, better known as V.P. Shetty, is an Indian banker who is the Chairman of JM Financial Asset Reconstruction Co. Pvt. Ltd., JM Financial Asset Management Co. Pvt. Ltd. and JM Financial Products Ltd. He retired as chairman and managing director of IDBI Bank in 2007. Before joining IDBI, he was also chairman and managing director of UCO Bank and Canara Bank. He began his career with Vijaya Bank.

== Life ==
Shetty was the chairman of Indian Banks' Association from 2006 to 2007.
