= Vikrant Shetty =

Emirati cricketer (born 1983)

Personal information
- Full name: Vikrant Shetty
- Born: 17 October 1983 (age 43); Mumbai, Maharashtra, India
- Batting: Right-handed
- Bowling: Right-arm off-break
- Role: Batsman

International information
- National side: United Arab Emirates
- Only ODI (cap 35): 24 June 2008 v Bangladesh

Career statistics
Competition	ODI
Matches	1
Runs scored	7
Batting average	7.00
100s/50s	0/0
Top score	7
Balls bowled	–
Wickets	–
Bowling average	–
5 wickets in innings	–
10 wickets in match	–
Best bowling	–
Catches/stumpings	0/–
- Source: CricketArchive, 29 November 2008

Vikrant Shetty (born 17 October 1983) is an Indian-born cricketer who played for the United Arab Emirates national cricket team. He has played one One Day International for the United Arab Emirates.
