= Pooja Shri Shetty =

Indian Karateka

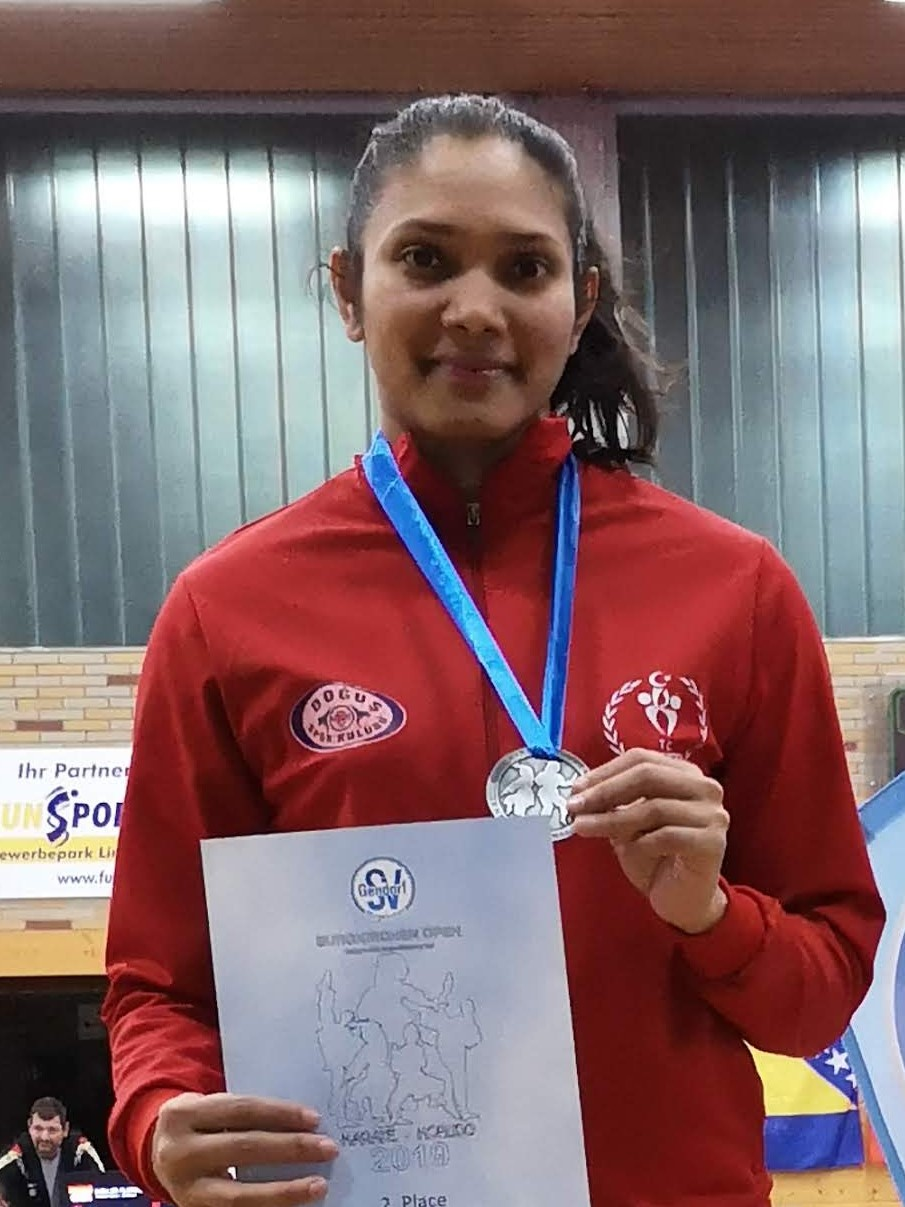

Personal information
- Nationality: Indian
- Born: Kaup, Udupi
- Education: Cranfield University
- Height: 168 cm (5 ft 6 in)
- Weight: 58 kg (128 lb; 9 st 2 lb)

Sport
- Sport: Karate
- Weight class: -61 Kg
- Event: Kumite
Medal record
Representing India
Women's Karate
Open Karate Championships
Bronze medal – third place	2019 Istanbul	Kumite-61 kg
Bronze medal – third place	2019 Helsinki	Kumite-61 kg
Silver medal – second place	2019 Burgkirchen German	Kumite-61 kg

Pooja Shri Shetty is an Indian Karateka and an Aerospace engineer competing in the kumite 61 kg division.

== Early life ==
Pooja Shri Shetty was born in a Tulu speaking bunt family in Kaup, Udupi. She completed her schooling from Little Rock Indian School and graduated with Bachelor's degree in Aerospace engineering from Amity University, Noida followed by a Master's degree in Aerospace Propulsion from Cranfield University, UK.

== Achievements ==
Pooja started training in karate from the age of 6. She has represented India in several WKF Karate Series A tournaments and International Championships. Her Tokyo Olympics 2020 standing is 181.

Championship	Venue	Position
International Bosphorous Open Karate Championship	Istanbul, Turkey	Bronze
Olympic Standing World Karate Championship Series "A"	Istanbul, Turkey	Participation
Helsinki Open Karate Championship	Helsinki, Finland	Bronze
Serbian Open Karate Championship	Serbia	Participation
Olympic Standing World Karate Championship Series "A"	Santiago, Chile	Participation
Burgkirchen International Open Karate Championship	Germany	Silver
