= Kedambadi Jagannath Shetty =

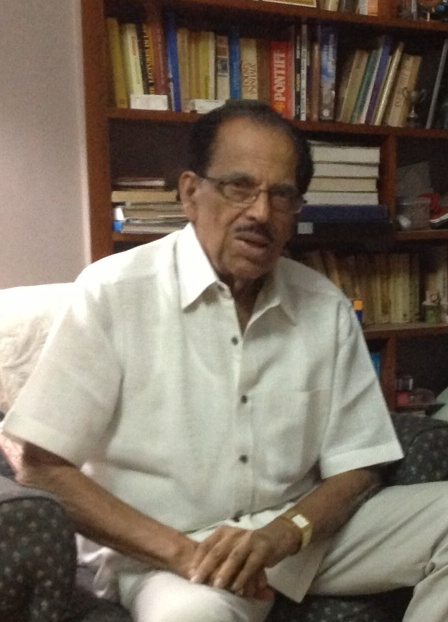
- Born: Puttur, Karnataka, India
- Occupations: Retired Judge, High Court of Karnataka

Kedambadi Jagannath Shetty (died 12 February 2016) was an Indian jurist and a retired Judge of Karnataka High Court.

He died on 12 February 2016 after prolonged illness.

== Commissions of inquiry ==
He was the head of two commissions of inquiry instituted by the Government of Karnataka; one on the Bhatkal Communal Riots, and one on a Haveri Police Firing.
