= Kalidas Shetty =

Food scientist

Kalidas Shetty is a noted food scientist and professor of food science at the University of Massachusetts Amherst, and a recipient of the Jefferson science fellowship. Currently he serves as Associate Vice President for International Partnerships and Collaborations and Professor Plant Metabolism and Food Security at North Dakota State University, Fargo, ND. He is the author of a significant number of books on food science. He holds at least four patents and has been editor of several reputed agricultural publications.

== Personal life ==
Shetty was born in a Tulu-speaking Bunt family in Jayapura near Chikmagaluru, India. He is the eldest of four sons born to N Ramanna Shetty and Ganga Shetty. He is married to Geeta Shetty. They have two sons---Varun and Vishal.

== Education ==
Shetty studied at Bishop Cotton Boys' School in Bangalore and in M.G.M.college, Udupi. He earned a Bachelor of Science in agriculture in 1983 at the University of Agricultural Sciences, Bangalore. He received an M.S. in bacteriology in 1985 and a Ph.D. in 1989 at the University of Idaho. Shetty held his postdoctoral training at the National Institute of Agro-Biological Research, Japan, and at the University of Guelph, Ontario, Canada.

== Awards and work ==
Shetty is also an affiliate faculty with NASA Space Food Technology Commercial Space Center at Iowa State University, Breast Cancer Research Cluster, Bay State Health System, Springfield, MA, Molecular and Cellular Biology- UMASS, Plant Biology- UMASS and Environmental Science- UMASS. He holds at least four patents and has been an editor of several reputed agricultural publications. Research in his laboratory focuses on molecular physiology of secondary metabolite synthesis in plants. Dr. Shetty was awarded 8 gold medals for academic excellence at the University of Agricultural Sciences, Bangalore. He has also received Science and Technology Post-doctoral Fellowship of the Japan Government 1990–1991.

== Published works and patents ==
- Adyanthaya I, Kwon Y-I, Apostolidis E, Shetty K, 2009. Antioxidant Response Mechanisms in Apples During Post Harvest Storage and Implication for Human Health Benefits. Journal of Food Biochemistry. Vol 33:4, 535–556
- Randhir, R., Kwon, Y-I., Lin, Y-T. and Shetty, K. (2009) Effect of thermal processing on phenolic associated health-relevant functionality of selected legume sprouts and seedlings. J. Food Biochemistry, 33: 89–112.
- kwon, Y-I., Apostolidis, E. and Shetty, K., (2008) Inhibitory potential of wine and tea against alpha-amylase and alpha-glucosidase for management of hyperglycemia linked to type 2 diabetes. J. Food Biochemistry, 32: 15–31.
- Apostolidis, E., Kwon, Y-I. and Shetty, K. (2008) Inhibition of Listeria monocytogenes by oregano, cranberry and sodium lactate combinations in broth and cooked ground beef systems and likely mode of action through proline metabolism. International J. Food Microbiology, 128: 317–324.
- Shetty, K. and Wahlqvist, M.L. (2004) A model for the role of proline-linked pentose phosphate pathway in phenolic phytochemical biosynthesis and mechanism of action for human health and environmental applications. Asia Pacific J. Clinical Nutrition, 13: 1-24.
- Food Biotechnology [Shetty, K., Paliyath, G., Pometto, A.L. III and Levin, R.E. (eds)]. CRC Press (Taylor and Francis Co), Boca Raton, Florida.
- Functional Foods and Biotechnology [Shetty, K., Paliyath, G., Pometto, A.L. III and Levin, R.E. (eds)]. CRC Press (Taylor and Francis Co), Boca Raton, Florida.
