= Shantharam Shetty =

Indian orthopaedic surgeon

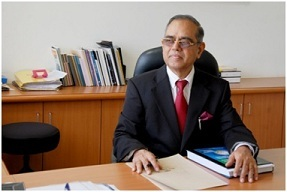
- Born: April 14, 1942 (age 84)
- Education: Mysore Medical College
- Known for: Orthopaedics, Trauma surgery

Molahalli Shantharam Shetty FRCS, (born 14 April 1942) is an orthopaedic surgeon and Pro Chancellor of Nitte University.

He is the founder and Chairman of the Tejasvini Hospital and Shantharam Shetty Institute of Orthopaedics and Traumatology (SSIOT), Mangalore. Shetty is a recipient of the Karnataka Rajyotsava Award for meritorious service in the field of medicine.

== Early life ==
Shetty was born on April 14, 1942, the third of six children and eldest son of Kidiyur Tejappa Shetty and Molahalli Vishalakshi Shetty, in Moodlakatte Doddamane, a Bunt house of Dakshina Kannada. He was educated at St. Aloysius' College Mangalore, and pursued a degree in medicine what was then Government Medical College, Mysore, graduating with honours in 1964.

Shetty married Vasanthi in 1967, and they have three daughters.

== Career ==
Upon graduation from medical school, Shetty went on to lecture in Orthopaedics at Bangalore Medical College and joined Maulana Azad Medical College, Delhi University, in 1968 to obtain his M.S.(Ortho) degree. After three years in Delhi, Shetty joined Kasturba Medical College as assistant professor and later served as professor and head of the Orthopaedics department from 1980 to 1997, training over 300 postgraduate students.

Shetty served as Dean at K.S. Hegde Medical Academy, retiring in 2007. Currently, he is Pro-Chancellor of Nitte University, Mangalore. He was the first Vice Chancellor of the Nitte University and also the Vice Chairman of the Nitte Education Trust.

In May 2004, Shetty founded SSIOT and Tejasvini Hospital, where he currently practices.

As an academician, he has 80 publications to his name; he has delivered more than 240 CME lectures, 180 scientific lectures and 19 named orations across India and all over the world.

== Achievements and awards ==
Shetty has several notable achievements and awards.

- 1984: Member of senate and academic council of Mangalore University (1984-1986)
- 1985: President of Karnataka Orthopaedic Association; AO Fellow in West Germany 1987: Ranawat Fellowship, USA
- 1990: President of Canara Orthopaedic Association (1990-2003)
- 1991: Karnataka Rajyotsava Award
- 2006: Nominated Indian AO Trustee, Switzerland
- 2009: President of the Indian Orthopaedic Association
- 2009: Vice-Chancellor of Nitte University
- 2011: FRCS, Royal College of Surgeons, London
- 2012: Pro-Chancellor of Nitte University

== Philanthropy ==
Shetty has been an active part of the Lions Club in Mangalore, serving in the past as District Governor, and has set up the Lions Tejasvini Dialysis Centre and free medical camps in his native town of Molahalli. He has served as project director of the Lions Artificial Limb Centre, Mangalore, since 1975.

Shetty has previously been Chairman of the Indian Red Cross branch, Chairman of the World Bunts’ Foundation Trust, involved in the Rotary Club (winning the Vocational Service Award in 2000), and President of the South Canara Branch of the Indian Medical Association, within which he won the award for Meritorious Service in 1999.
