= Vijaya Bank =

Indian public-sector banking group

- Type: Public
- Traded as: BSE: 532401; NSE: VIJAYABANK
- ISIN: INE705A01016
- Industry: Banking; Financial services
- Founded: 23 October 1931; 94 years ago Mangalore, Madras Presidency, British India
- Founder: A. B. Shetty
- Defunct: 1 April 2019; 7 years ago
- Fate: Merged with Bank of Baroda
- Successor: Bank of Baroda
- Headquarters: No. 41/2, M G Road, Bangalore, Karnataka, India
- Number of locations: 2,136 branches 2,155 ATMs (2018)
- Area served: India
- Services: Consumer banking, corporate banking, finance and insurance, investment banking, mortgage loans, private banking, wealth management
- Revenue: ▲₹14,190.45 crore (US$1.5 billion) (2018)
- Operating income: ▲₹3,098 crore (US$320 million) (2018)
- Net income: ▲₹727 crore (US$75 million) (2018)
- Total assets: ▲₹177,632.04 crore (US$18 billion) (2018)
- Total equity: ▲₹10,627.19 crore (US$1.1 billion) (2018)
- Number of employees: 16,079 (2018)
- Capital ratio: 13.90% (2018)

Vijaya Bank was a PSU bank, one of the nationalised banks in India. Its head office was in Bangalore, Karnataka. The bank offered a wide range of financial products and services to customers through its various delivery channels. As of March 2017, the bank had a network of 2031 branches throughout the country and over 4,000 customer touch points including 2001 ATMs. It was merged with Bank of Baroda on 1 April 2019.

== History ==
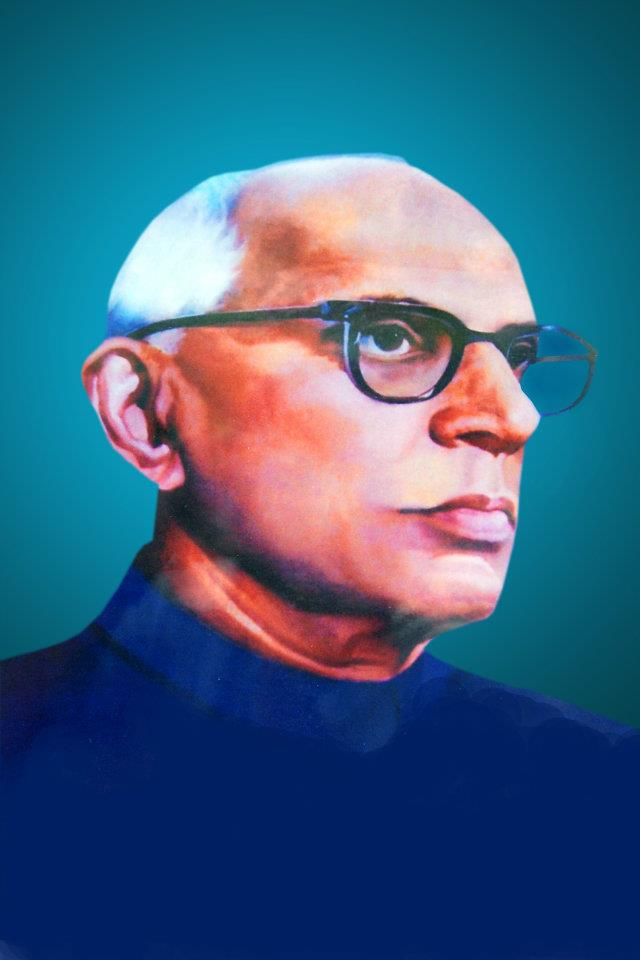
A. B. Shetty

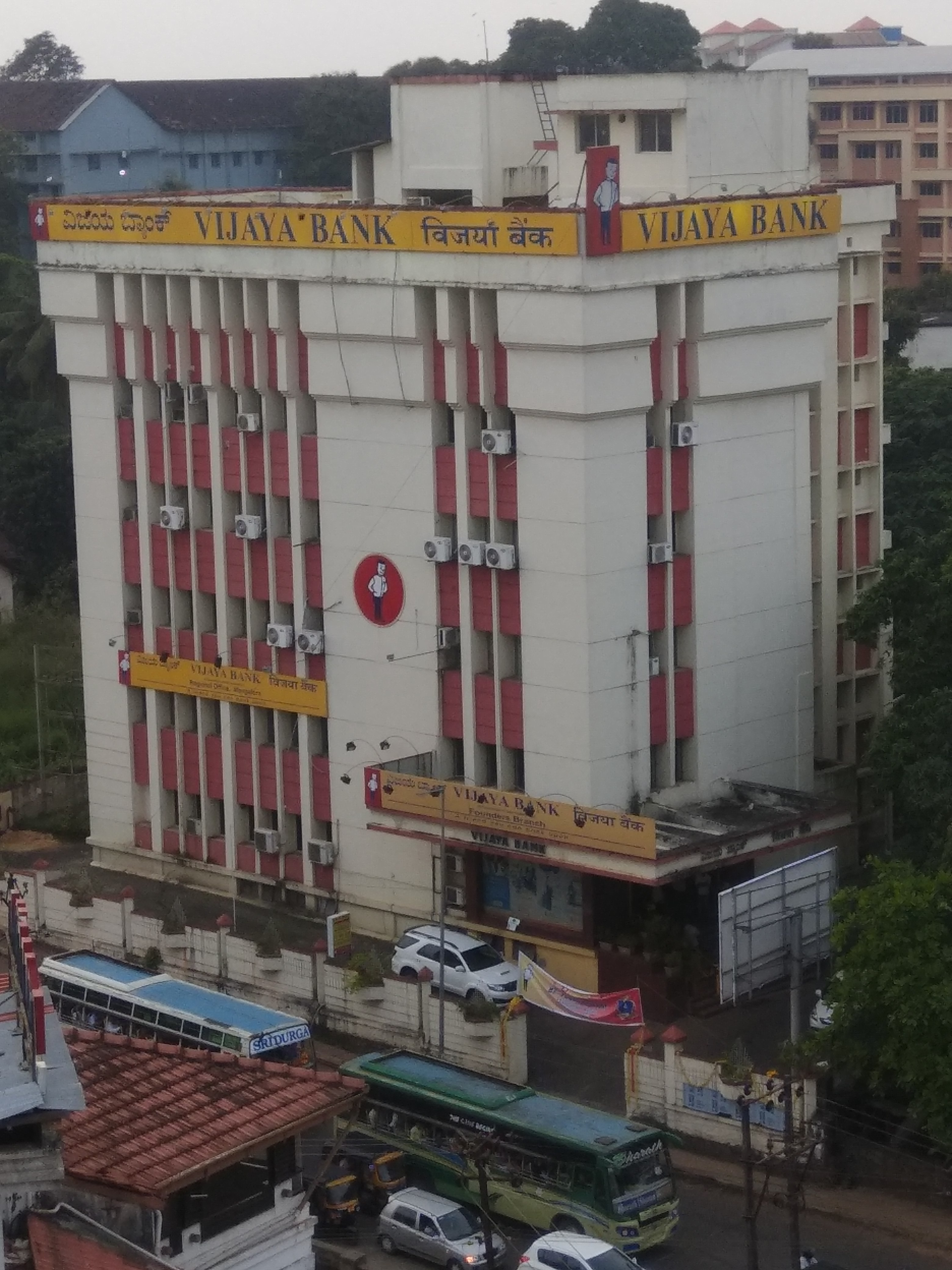
Vijaya Bank Founders Branch, Mangalore

Vijaya Bank was established by a group of farmers led by A. B. Shetty on 23 October 1931 in Mangalore, Dakshina Kannada district of Princely State of Mysore (present-day Karnataka). Since it was established on day of Vijayadashami, it was named "Vijaya Bank".

During the economic chaos created out of the Great Depression of 1927–30, Shetty approached leading Bunt personalities to start a bank with the objective of extending credit facilities at a lower rate of interest to enable the farmers to cultivate their lands and prevent them from falling into the clutches of money lenders. Accordingly, Shetty involved 14 Bunts and established Vijaya Bank on 23 October 1931. In the beginning the bank had an authorised capital of ₹5 lakh and an issued capital of ₹2 lakh. The paid up capital was ₹8,670.

=== Growth and nationalisation ===
The bank grew steadily since its inception. The bank became a scheduled bank in 1958. Under the chairmanship of Shri. Mulki Sunder Ram Shetty, Vijaya Bank steadily grew into a large All India Bank with 9 smaller banks merging with it during 1963–1968. In 1965, the bank registered its own logo. The bank's head office was shifted to Bangalore on 11 November 1969. The bank was nationalised on 15 April 1980. At the time of nationalization, the bank had 571 branches, with a total business of ₹605.95 crore and a staff strength of 9059.

The present head office building of the Bank is at Mahatma Gandhi Road, Bangalore. It was inaugurated on 26 October 1984.

=== Amalgamation ===
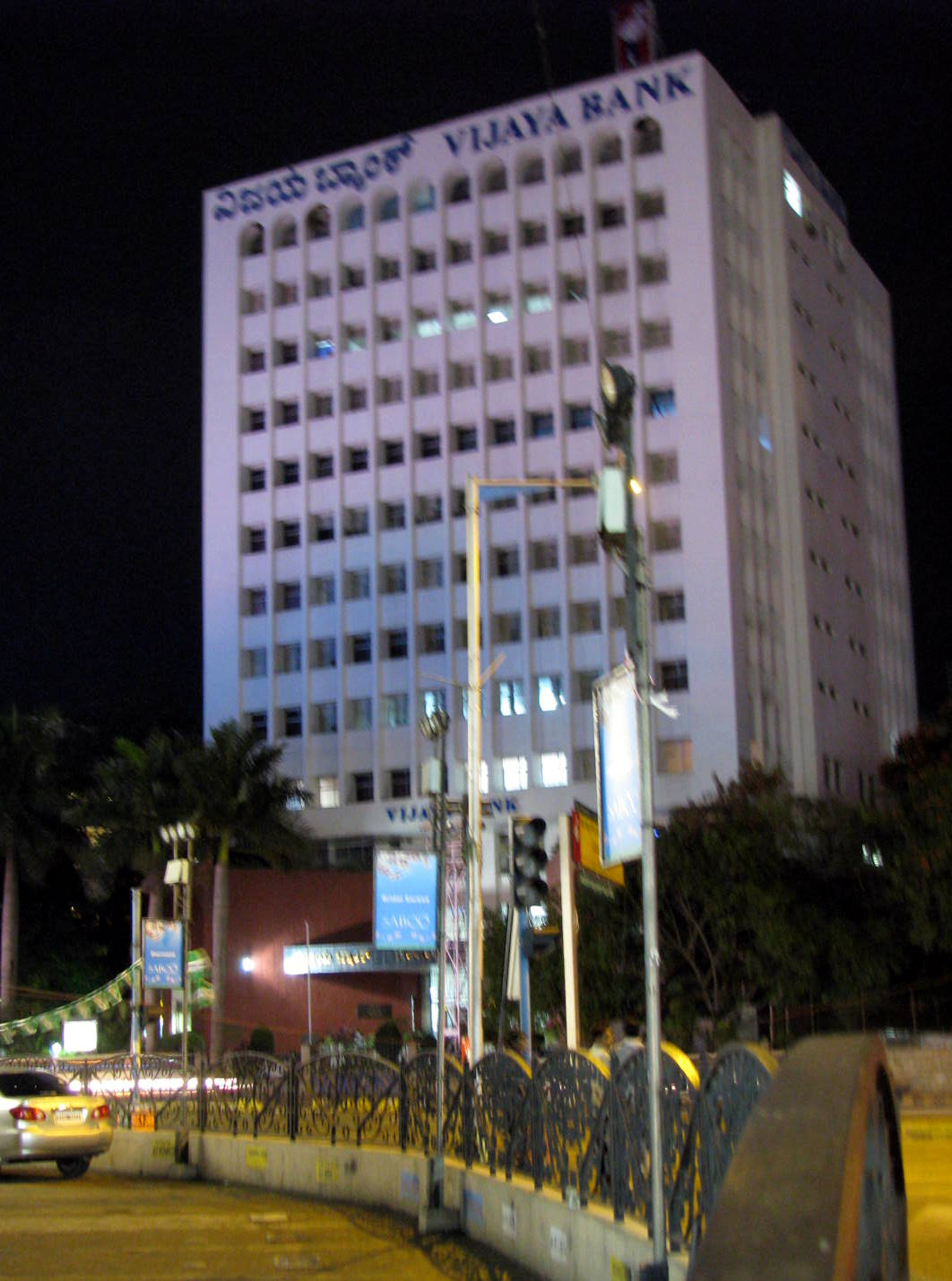
Vijaya Bank head office in MG Road, Bangalore

On 17 September 2018, the Finance Ministry of the Government of India proposed to amalgamate 3 state run banks, viz. Vijaya Bank, Bank of Baroda and Dena Bank into a single bank as an effort to consolidate the country's banking system. The amalgamated bank was set to become the third biggest bank in India with a total business of more than ₹1,482,000,000,000 (equivalent to ₹2.2 trillion or US$22 billion in 2026). The boards of the three banks are to meet to consider the proposal. The agenda behind the amalgamation of the banks was to lower Non-performing assets. The Gross NPA OF the Bank of Baroda, Vijaya Bank and Dena Bank is 12.4%, 6.9% and 22% respectively.

The merger was approved by the Union Cabinet and the boards of the banks on 2 January 2019. Under the terms of the merger, Dena Bank and Vijaya Bank shareholders received 110 and 402 equity shares of the Bank of Baroda, respectively, of face value ₹2 for every 1,000 shares they held. The merger is effective from 1 April 2019. Vijaya Bank that has merged with Bank of Baroda has built a museum that dedicated to its history.

== Business operations ==
The bank's total business was over ₹2,29,000 crore comprising deposits of ₹1,33,012 crore and advances of ₹96,821 crore as at 31 March 2017. Basically being a retail bank, its topline growth owes quite a lot to the retail segments. Retail advances of the bank constitute 30% of the gross credit.

As of 31 March 2017, the bank had a wide branch network of 2031 branches. The bank had 2001 ATMs as of 31 March 2017. Vijaya Bank provides access to over 2.21 lakh ATMs connected under National Financial Switch across the country.

== Financial inclusion initiatives ==
The Bank has been actively pursuing the agenda of financial inclusion. The bank's initiatives in this direction aim at financial empowerment and reaching banking services to the rural masses. The bank has been opening Basic Savings Bank Accounts under Pradhan Mantri Jan Dhan Yojana and providing all the account holders with Rupay debit cards. It participates in promoting social security schemes such as Pradhan Mantri Suraksha Bima Yojana, Pradhan Mantri Jeevan Jyoti Bima Yojana and Atal Pension Yojana. The bank is also implementing the modified Direct Benefit Transfer (DBT) programme of the Government of India.

== See also ==
Vijaya bank layout(Layout Founded by Vijaya bank)
