= K. K. Shetty =

Indian politician

Member of Parliament
- In office 1971–1977
- Preceded by: C. M. Poonacha
- Succeeded by: Janardhana Poojary
- Constituency: Mangalore

Chairman, Mysore Legislative Council
- In office 5 September 1968 – 18 May 1970
- Preceded by: R. B. Naik (acting)
- Succeeded by: K. Subba Rao (acting)

Member, Mysore Legislative Council
- In office 1956–1970

Personal details
- Born: Kemthur Kanthappa Shetty; 18 April 1901; Kemthur, South Canara, Madras Presidency, British India (now in Dakshina Kannada, Karnataka, India)
- Died: 15 August 1987 (aged 86); Mangalore, Dakshina Kannada, Karnataka, India
- Political party: Indian National Congress
- Spouse: Nethravati Shetty (m. 1936)
- Children: 7

Kemthur Kanthappa Shetty (18 April 1901 – 15 August 1987) was an Indian politician. He was a member of Lok Sabha, the lower House of the Indian Parliament from Mangalore. He was a member of Indian National Congress. Prior to being elected member of parliament, he served as the Chairman, Mysore Legislative Council between 1968 and 1970.
