= Udupi Chikmagalur Lok Sabha constituency =

Constituency of the Indian parliament in Karnataka

Coordinates: 13.4°N 75.2°E

Udupi Chikmagalur
- Lok Sabha constituency
- Udupi Chikmagalur Lok Sabha Constituency Map

Constituency details
- Country: India
- Region: South India
- State: Karnataka
- Assembly constituencies: Kundapura; Udupi; Kapu; Karkala; Sringeri; Mudigere; Chikmagalur; Tarikere
- Established: 2008
- Total electors: 1,387,295
- Reservation: None

Member of Parliament
- 18th Lok Sabha
- Incumbent Kota Srinivas Poojary
- Party: Bharatiya Janata Party
- Elected year: 2024

Udupi Chikmagalur Lok Sabha constituency is one of the 28 Lok Sabha (lower house of Indian parliament) constituencies in Karnataka a state in southern India. This constituency was created as part of the implementation of the delimitation of the parliamentary constituencies in 2008, based on the recommendations of the Delimitation Commission of India constituted in 2002. It first held elections in 2009 and its first member of parliament was D. V. Sadananda Gowda of the Bharatiya Janata Party (BJP). Gowda was selected on 4 August 2011 to become Chief Minister (CM) of Karnataka after the previous CM B. S. Yeddyurappa resigned. He therefore had to resign as MP for this seat which forced a by-election in 2012. This by-election was won by K. Jayaprakash Hegde of the Indian National Congress (INC). As of the latest elections in 2019, Shobha Karandlaje of the BJP represents this constituency.

== Assembly segments ==
As of 2013, Udupi Chikmagalur Lok Sabha constituency comprises the following eight Vidhan Sabha (Legislative Assembly) segments:

| No | Name | District | Member | Party | 2024 lead |
|---|---|---|---|---|---|
| 119 | Kundapura | Udupi | Kiran Kumar Kodgi | BJP | BJP |
| 120 | Udupi | Udupi | Yashpal Anand Suvarna | BJP | BJP |
| 121 | Kapu | Udupi | Gurme Suresh Shetty | BJP | BJP |
| 122 | Karkala | Udupi | V. Sunil Kumar | BJP | BJP |
| 123 | Sringeri | Chikmagalur | T. D. Rajegowda | INC | BJP |
| 124 | Mudigere (SC) | Chikmagalur | Nayana Motamma | INC | BJP |
| 125 | Chikmagalur | Chikmagalur | H. D. Thammaiah | INC | BJP |
| 126 | Tarikere | Chikmagalur | G. H. Srinivasa | INC | BJP |

== Members of Parliament ==
- This seat was created in 2008 re-organization of Lok Sabha seats. For results before that, see : South Kanara (North), Chikmagalur and Udupi

| Year | Name | Party |
|---|---|---|
Till 2008 : See Udupi, Chikmagalur
| 2009 | Sadananda Gowda | Bharatiya Janata Party |
| 2012^ | Jayaprakash Hegde | Indian National Congress |
| 2014 | Shobha Karandlaje | Bharatiya Janata Party |
| 2019 | Shobha Karandlaje | Bharatiya Janata Party |
| 2024 | Kota Srinivas Poojary | Bharatiya Janata Party |

== Election results ==
=== General Election 2024 ===
2024 Indian general election: Udupi Chikmagalur
| Party | Candidate | Votes | % | ±% |
|---|---|---|---|---|
| BJP | Kota Srinivas Poojary | 732,234 | 59.56 | ▼2.90 |
| INC | K. Jayaprakash Hegde | 4,73,059 | 38.48 | N/A |
| NOTA | None of the above | 11,269 | 0.92 | ▲0.27 |
| Majority | | 2,59,175 | 21.08 | ▼9.29 |
| Turnout | | 12,31,062 | 77.63 | ▲1.56 |
| BJP hold | | Swing | ▼2.90 | |

=== 2019 ===
2019 Indian general elections: Udupi Chikmagalur
| Party | Candidate | Votes | % | ±% |
|---|---|---|---|---|
| BJP | Shobha Karandlaje | 718,916 | 62.46 | +6.26 |
| JD(S) | Pramod Madhwaraj | 3,69,317 | 32.09 | −6.54 |
| BSP | P. Parameshwar | 15,947 | 1.39 | |
| Independent | P. Amrith Shenoy | 7,981 | 0.69 | |
| NOTA | None of the Above | 7,510 | 0.65 | |
| Margin of victory | | 3,49,599 | 30.37 | |
| Turnout | | 11,51,623 | 76.07 | |
| BJP hold | | Swing | | |

=== General election 2014 ===
2014 Indian general elections: Udupi Chikmagalur
| Party | Candidate | Votes | % | ±% |
|---|---|---|---|---|
| BJP | Shobha Karandlaje | 581,168 | 56.20 | +14.81 |
| INC | K. Jayaprakash Hegde | 3,99,525 | 38.63 | −8.12 |
| JD(S) | V. Dhananjaya Kumar | 14,895 | 1.44 | −7.01 |
| CPI | S. Vijaya Kumar | 9,691 | 0.94 | N/A |
| NOTA | None of the above | 7,828 | 0.76 | N/A |
| Margin of victory | | 1,81,643 | 17.57 | +12.21 |
| Turnout | | 10,34,334 | 74.56 | +6.48 |
| BJP gain from INC | | Swing | | |

=== By-election 2012 ===
Bye-election, 2012: Udupi Chikmagalur
| Party | Candidate | Votes | % | ±% |
|---|---|---|---|---|
| INC | K. Jayaprakash Hegde | 398,723 | 46.75 | +1.89 |
| BJP | V. Sunil Kumar | 3,52,999 | 41.39 | −6.70 |
| JD(S) | S. L. Bhoje Gowda | 72,080 | 8.45 | N/A |
| IND | Harishyanbhog Kateel | 6,930 | 0.81 | N/A |
| JD(U) | K. Bharathesh | 4,945 | 0.58 | N/A |
| Margin of victory | | 45,724 | 5.36 | +2.13 |
| Turnout | | 8,52,825 | 68.06 | −0.12 |
| INC gain from BJP | | Swing | | |

=== General election 2009 ===
2009 Indian general elections: Udupi Chikmagalur
| Party | Candidate | Votes | % | ±% |
|---|---|---|---|---|
| BJP | D. V. Sadananda Gowda | 401,441 | 48.09 | N/A |
| INC | K. Jayaprakash Hegde | 3,74,423 | 44.86 | N/A |
| CPI(M) | Radha Sundaresh | 24,991 | 2.99 | N/A |
| Independent | Srinivas Poojary | 11,263 | 1.35 | N/A |
| BSP | J. Steven Menezes | 9,971 | 1.19 | N/A |
| Margin of victory | | 27,018 | 3.23 | N/A |
| Turnout | | 8,34,728 | 68.18 | N/A |
| BJP win (new seat) | | | | |

== See also ==
- Udupi Lok Sabha constituency
- Chikmagalur Lok Sabha constituency (1967-2004 elections)
- Hassan Chickmagalur Lok Sabha constituency, only for 1952 election
- South Kanara (North) Lok Sabha constituency
