= Pramod Madhwaraj =

Indian politician

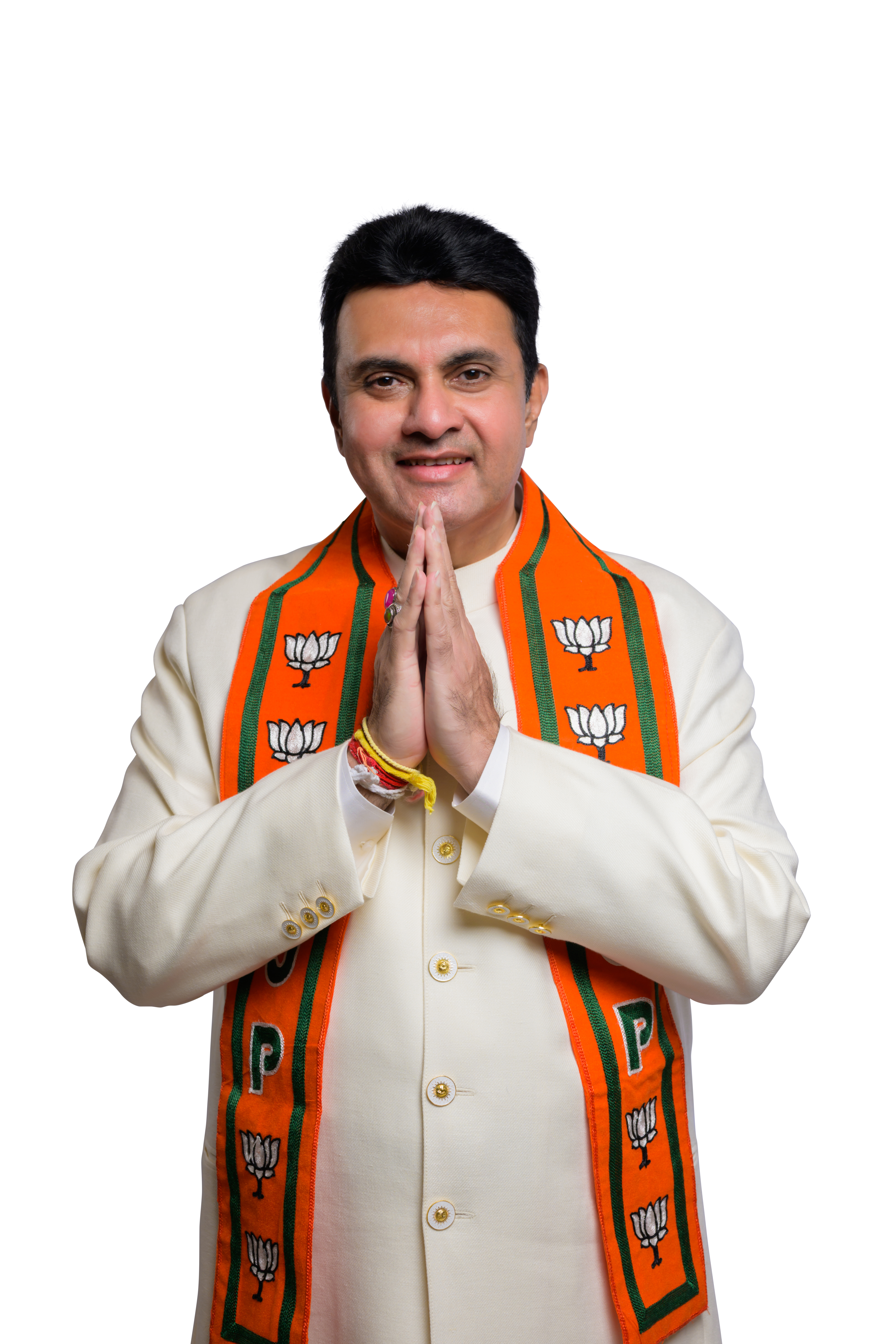
- Photo of Pramod Madhwaraj

National General Secretary, BJP OBC Morcha
- Incumbent
- Assumed office 21 November 2026

Member of the Legislative Assembly, Karnataka
- In office 2013–2018
- Preceded by: K. Raghupati Bhat
- Succeeded by: K. Raghupati Bhat
- Constituency: Udupi

Minister of State for Fisheries, Youth Empowerment and Sports of Karnataka
- In office 2016 – May 2018

Personal details
- Born: 17 October 1968 (age 58) Udupi, Karnataka State, India
- Party: BJP
- Other political affiliations: Indian National Congress (resigned on 07-May-2022)
- Parent(s): Malpe Madwaraj; Manorama Madhwaraj
- Occupation: Politician, Businessman
- Website: www.pramodmadhwaraj.in

Pramod Madhwaraj is an Indian politician and a member of the Bharatiya Janata Party from Karnataka. He represented the Udupi Assembly constituency from 2013 to 2018. In June 2016, he was inducted into the Siddaramaiah-led Government of Karnataka as a Minister of State with Independent Charge, holding the portfolios of Fisheries, Youth Empowerment and Sports. He joined the BJP in May 2022 after resigning from Indian National Congress. In November 2026, he was appointed National General Secretary of the BJP OBC Morcha.

== Family ==
Pramod Madhwaraj is married to Supriya Madhwaraj and they have a daughter Prathyaksha Raj. He is the son of former Congress Minister Manorama Madhwaraj. and Mathsayaraja Late Shri Malpe Madhwaraj.

== Political life ==
Pramod Madhwaraj had represented Udupi Assembly constituency from 2013 to 2018. He had earlier unsuccessfully fought the 2008 Karnataka Legislative Assembly election on an Indian National Congress ticket losing to K. Raghupati Bhat of the Bharatiya Janata Party by about 2,500 votes. However, in the following 2013 Karnataka Legislative Assembly election Madhwaraj won the seat defeating B. Sudhakar Shetty of the Bharatiya Janata Party by over 39,000 votes. In the 2018 Karnataka Legislative Assembly election, Madhwaraj lost to K. Raghupati Bhat of the Bharatiya Janata Party by about 2,000 votes and a margin of 5%.

Madhwaraj was educated in Mahatma Gandhi Memorial College and National Institute of Technology, Karnataka. He completed his primary education at St. Cecily's Convent, Udupi and Christian High School Udupi. Pramod Madhwaraj is the managing Trustee of M Madhwaraj Charitable Trust which is named after his late father M. Madhwaraj. The trust is very popular among the poor and helps a lot of poor people to make their ends meet. He joined the JD(S) ahead of the 2019 Lok Sabha Elections but campaigned for Congress president Rahul Gandhi as his party was in alliance with the Congress. He contested unsuccessfully from the Udupi Chikmagalur Lok Sabha constituency against Shobha Karandlaje of the BJP and lost by a margin of over 3,50,000 votes.

== Departure from the Congress ==
On 7 May 2022, Pramod Madhwaraj resigned from the Congress party, expressing "political suffocation" in the Udupi district Congress. 2 days later, he joined the rival BJP.

== Ministry ==
Besides holding the Youth Services Department, Fisheries from Animal Husbandry and Fisheries Department portfolio Madhwaraj also serves as the District In-Charge Minister for Udupi district. As the Fisheries minister Madhwaraj has tried to regulate fishing in coastal areas due to the depletion of aquatic animals on account of over fishing.

== Party posts ==
On 21 November 2026, Madhwaraj was appointed National General Secretary of the BJP's OBC Morcha.
