= V. S. Acharya =

Indian politician (1940–2012)

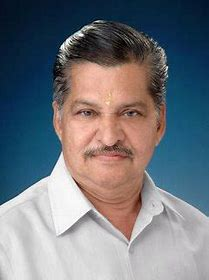
- Dr.V.S Acharya

Cabinet Minister Government of Karnataka
- In office 30 May 2008 – 14 February 2012
- Ministry: Term
- Minister of Higher Education: 23 September 2010 - 14 February 2012
- Minister of Home Affairs: 30 May 2008 - 23 September 2010
- In office 12 February 2006 – 8 October 2007
- Ministry: Term
- Minister of Medical Education: 12 February 2006 - 8 October 2007
- Minister of Animal Husbandry: 12 February 2006 - 21 June 2006

Member of Karnataka Legislative Council
- In office 1 July 1996 – 14 February 2012
- Constituency: elected by Legislative Assembly members

Member of Karnataka Legislative Assembly
- In office 1983–1985
- Preceded by: Manorama Madhwaraj
- Succeeded by: Manorama Madhwaraj
- Constituency: Udupi

Personal details
- Born: Vedavyasa Srinivasa Acharya; 6 July 1940 Udupi, Madras Presidency
- Died: 14 February 2012 (aged 71)
- Spouse: Shanta
- Occupation: Higher Education Minister

Vedavyasa Srinivasa Acharya (6 July 1940 – 14 February 2012) was an Indian senior leader of the Bharatiya Janata Party (BJP) in Karnataka. He was the Higher Education Minister in the Government of Karnataka.

== Early life ==
V.S. Acharya was born on 6 July 1940 in Udupi, then part of the Madras Presidency, into a traditional Shivalli Madhwa Brahmin family. His parents were Vidwan Katte Srinivasa Acharya, a Sanskrit scholar, and Smt. Krishnaveni Amma. After his graduation in Medicine from the Kasturba Medical College, Manipal, he started his medical career by opening a private clinic in Kalmadi, Udupi, and earned fame as a good physician in the town. He married a social worker, Dr. Shanta Acharya, and the couple had four sons and one daughter.

== Political career ==
Having been associated with the Rashtriya Swayamsevak Sangh from his childhood. He started his political career in the erstwhile Bharatiya Jana Sangh, the predecessor of the BJP. He was first elected as a municipal councillor and then, as president of the Udupi municipal council in 1968. This was the first ever victory of the Jana Sangh in an urban municipality in South India. The BJP leader Lal Krishna Advani later remarked that the Jana Sangh victory in the Udupi municipal council in 1968 laid foundation for the BJP rule in South India and particularly in the state of Karnataka. As the youngest municipal president of Udupi, he was hailed for his pro-active role in the development of the town. He remained municipal president for a period of 8 years and the Swarna River water supply system, Under ground drainage system, Town roads widening etc.were some of his achievements during this period. Under his presidency Udupi Municipality in 1968 became first in nation to ban carrying night soil by humans.

During the Emergency (1975–77), he was imprisoned for a period of 19 months. After being released, he unsuccessfully contested the Lok Sabha elections from Udupi in 1977 and 1980. He was elected as a member of the Karnataka Legislative Assembly from Udupi constituency in 1983 and was the floor leader of the BJP Legislature party. He was a Member of the Karnataka Legislative Council from 1996 until his death.

In the BJP-Janata Dal (Secular) coalition government headed by H.D.Kumaraswamy, he was Cabinet minister for Medical Education with additional charge of Animal Husbandry. Following the historic victory of the BJP in Karnataka in the 2008 state assembly elections, he was appointed the Home minister in the Yeddyurappa government. He was considered as the second most important leader of the government after the Chief minister and was also the Leader of the House in the legislative council. As home minister, he was credited with the streamlining of administration and modernising of the police force in the state. Later, he was appointed the Higher Education minister in 2010.

Acharya was one of the most senior leaders of the BJP in Karnataka and as such, played an important role in the growth of the party in the state. He was president of the Dakshina Kannada district unit of the Jana Sangh (1974–77), Janata Party (1977–80) and BJP (1980–83). Also, he played a major role in the formation of the Udupi district in 1998. Known for his honesty, simplicity, dedication, wit and hard work, the soft-spoken Acharya was widely respected in the BJP and across party lines. As a loyal worker of the Rashtriya Swayamsevak Sangh, he remained committed to the ideology and discipline of the organisation and inspired thousands of BJP workers and leaders.

== Death ==
He died of a heart attack on 14 February 2012. He was participating in a program when he suddenly collapsed. He died on the way to the hospital.

The Chief minister D.V. Sadananda Gowda described him as the conscience keeper of the BJP Government. Various other leaders like L.K. Advani and B.S. Yeddyurappa paid homage to him and praised the services rendered by Acharya to the party and the state.
