= Kundapura Assembly constituency =

Legislative Assembly constituency in Karnataka State, India

Coordinates: 13.62°N 74.69°E

Kundapura
- Constituency No. 119 for the Karnataka Legislative Assembly

Constituency details
- Country: India
- Region: South India
- State: Karnataka
- District: Udupi
- Lok Sabha constituency: Udupi Chikmagalur
- Established: 1951
- Total electors: 209,592
- Reservation: None

Member of Legislative Assembly
- 16th Karnataka Legislative Assembly
- Incumbent Kiran Kumar Kodgi
- Party: Bharatiya Janata Party
- Elected year: 2023
- Preceded by: Halady Srinivas Shetty

Kundapura Assembly constituency is one of the 224 Legislative Assembly constituencies of Karnataka in India.

It is part of Udupi district. Kiran Kumar Kodgi is the current MLA from Kundapura.

== Members of the Legislative Assembly ==
Election	Member	Party
1952	Manjayya Shetty	Indian National Congress
1957	V. Srinivasa Shetty	Praja Socialist Party
1962	S. S. Kolkebail	Indian National Congress
1967	Winnifged. E. Fernandes	Praja Socialist Party
1972	Winnifged. E. Fernandes	Indian National Congress
1978	Kaup Sanjiva Shetty	Janata Party
1983	K. Prathapachandra Shetty	Indian National Congress
1985	K. Prathapachandra Shetty	Indian National Congress
1989	K. Prathapachandra Shetty	Indian National Congress
1994	K. Prathapachandra Shetty	Indian National Congress
1999	Halady Srinivas Shetty	Bharatiya Janata Party
2004	Halady Srinivas Shetty	Bharatiya Janata Party
2008	Halady Srinivas Shetty	Bharatiya Janata Party
2013	Halady Srinivas Shetty	Independent politician
2018	Halady Srinivas Shetty	Bharatiya Janata Party
2023	Kiran Kumar Kodgi	Bharatiya Janata Party

== Election results ==
=== Assembly Election 2023 ===
2023 Karnataka Legislative Assembly election : Kundapura
Party	Candidate	Votes	%	±%
BJP	Kiran Kumar Kodgi	102,424	61.16%	▼4.04
INC	Dinesh Hegde Molahalli	60,868	36.35%	▲6.71
UPP	Arun Deepak Mendonca	1,257	0.75%	New
NOTA	None of the above	1,141	0.68%	▼0.46
JD(S)	Ramesh	1,053	0.63%	▼1.08
Margin of victory		41,556	24.81%	▼10.74
Turnout		167,594	79.96%	▲0.41
Total valid votes		167,471		
Registered electors		209,592		▲5.00
BJP hold		Swing	▼4.04	

=== Assembly Election 2018 ===
2018 Karnataka Legislative Assembly election : Kundapura
Party	Candidate	Votes	%	±%
BJP	Halady Srinivas Shetty	103,434	65.20%	▲54.71
INC	Rakesh Malli	47,029	29.64%	▲0.78
JD(S)	Thekkatte Prakash Shetty	2,712	1.71%	New
JD(U)	Rajiv Kotian	2,628	1.66%	New
NOTA	None of the above	1,813	1.14%	New
RPI(A)	Sudhakara Soorgoli	1,028	0.65%	New
Margin of victory		56,405	35.55%	▲6.21
Turnout		158,794	79.55%	▲3.13
Total valid votes		158,644		
Registered electors		199,617		▲9.71
BJP gain from Independent		Swing	▲7.00	

=== Assembly Election 2013 ===
2013 Karnataka Legislative Assembly election : Kundapura
Party	Candidate	Votes	%	±%
Independent	Halady Srinivas Shetty	80,563	58.20%	New
INC	Mallyadi Shivarama Shetty	39,952	28.86%	▼8.51
BJP	Kishore Kumar	14,524	10.49%	▼47.00
Independent	Srinivasa. H	2,442	1.76%	New
Margin of victory		40,611	29.34%	▲9.23
Turnout		139,037	76.42%	▼2.20
Total valid votes		138,430		
Registered electors		181,949		▲14.69
Independent gain from BJP		Swing	▲0.71	

=== Assembly Election 2008 ===
2008 Karnataka Legislative Assembly election : Kundapura
Party	Candidate	Votes	%	±%
BJP	Halady Srinivas Shetty	71,695	57.49%	▲1.74
INC	K. Jayaprakash Hegde	46,612	37.37%	▲0.22
SP	Mahammad Hussain	2,493	2.00%	New
BSP	Oswald Fernandes	2,010	1.61%	New
JD(S)	B. T. Manjunath Poojari	1,906	1.53%	New
Margin of victory		25,083	20.11%	▲1.50
Turnout		124,719	78.62%	▲11.39
Total valid votes		124,716		
Registered electors		158,643		▲0.77
BJP hold		Swing	▲1.74	

=== Assembly Election 2004 ===
2004 Karnataka Legislative Assembly election : Kundapura
Party	Candidate	Votes	%	±%
BJP	Halady Srinivas Shetty	58,923	55.75%	▲5.62
INC	Asok Kumar Hegde. G	39,258	37.15%	▼11.91
CPI(M)	Shankar. K	5,173	4.89%	New
Kannada Nadu Party	Sayyad Abbas	1,453	1.37%	New
Independent	Suresh Poojary. H	878	0.83%	New
Margin of victory		19,665	18.61%	▲17.54
Turnout		105,839	67.23%	▼0.81
Total valid votes		105,685		
Registered electors		157,423		▲9.42
BJP hold		Swing	▲5.62	

=== Assembly Election 1999 ===
1999 Karnataka Legislative Assembly election : Kundapura
Party	Candidate	Votes	%	±%
BJP	Halady Srinivas Shetty	48,051	50.13%	▲8.70
INC	K. Prathapachandra Shetty	47,030	49.06%	▲3.85
JD(S)	K. S. Hameed Sahib	780	0.81%	New
Margin of victory		1,021	1.07%	▼2.70
Turnout		97,882	68.04%	▲1.13
Total valid votes		95,861		
Rejected ballots		1,971	2.01%	▲0.85
Registered electors		143,868		▲4.36
BJP gain from INC		Swing	▲4.92	

=== Assembly Election 1994 ===
1994 Karnataka Legislative Assembly election : Kundapura
Party	Candidate	Votes	%	±%
INC	K. Prathapachandra Shetty	41,209	45.21%	▼13.39
BJP	A. G. Kodgi	37,770	41.43%	▲37.55
CPI(M)	Abraham Karkada	5,980	6.56%	New
JD	K. N. Govardhan	3,848	4.22%	▼30.38
INC	K. Sathish Ballal	1,281	1.41%	New
Margin of victory		3,439	3.77%	▼20.23
Turnout		92,235	66.91%	▲0.36
Total valid votes		91,155		
Rejected ballots		1,070	1.16%	▼3.36
Registered electors		137,852		▲10.07
INC hold		Swing	▼13.39	

=== Assembly Election 1989 ===
1989 Karnataka Legislative Assembly election : Kundapura
Party	Candidate	Votes	%	±%
INC	K. Prathapachandra Shetty	46,641	58.60%	▲2.48
JD	K. N. Govardhan	27,540	34.60%	New
BJP	K. Pundalika Nayak	3,086	3.88%	New
JP	U. D. Radhakrishna Maiya	2,018	2.54%	New
Margin of victory		19,101	24.00%	▲11.31
Turnout		83,354	66.55%	▼5.01
Total valid votes		79,589		
Rejected ballots		3,765	4.52%	▲3.57
Registered electors		125,245		▲30.09
INC hold		Swing	▲2.48	

=== Assembly Election 1985 ===
1985 Karnataka Legislative Assembly election : Kundapura
Party	Candidate	Votes	%	±%
INC	K. Prathapachandra Shetty	38,296	56.12%	▲1.23
JP	Appanna Hegde	29,638	43.43%	▲0.84
Margin of victory		8,658	12.69%	▲0.40
Turnout		68,897	71.56%	▲2.06
Total valid votes		68,245		
Rejected ballots		652	0.95%	▼0.53
Registered electors		96,273		▲11.44
INC hold		Swing	▲1.23	

=== Assembly Election 1983 ===
1983 Karnataka Legislative Assembly election : Kundapura
Party	Candidate	Votes	%	±%
INC	K. Prathapachandra Shetty	32,469	54.89%	▲49.87
JP	Mani Gopal	25,197	42.59%	▼6.50
Independent	Ravichandra	1,489	2.52%	New
Margin of victory		7,272	12.29%	▲9.09
Turnout		60,044	69.50%	▼2.54
Total valid votes		59,155		
Rejected ballots		889	1.48%	▼0.36
Registered electors		86,392		▲4.82
INC gain from JP		Swing	▲5.80	

=== Assembly Election 1978 ===
1978 Karnataka Legislative Assembly election : Kundapura
Party	Candidate	Votes	%	±%
JP	Kaup Sanjiva Shetty	28,612	49.09%	New
INC(I)	Mani Gopal	26,748	45.89%	New
INC	Winnifged. E. Fernandes	2,923	5.02%	▼43.03
Margin of victory		1,864	3.20%	▼1.46
Turnout		59,377	72.04%	▲7.47
Total valid votes		58,283		
Rejected ballots		1,094	1.84%	▲1.84
Registered electors		82,417		▲33.67
JP gain from INC		Swing	▲1.04	

=== Assembly Election 1972 ===
1972 Mysore State Legislative Assembly election : Kundapura
Party	Candidate	Votes	%	±%
INC	Winnifged. E. Fernandes	18,776	48.05%	▲3.20
INC(O)	Sanjeeva Shetty	16,954	43.38%	New
CPI(M)	Abraham Karkada	3,350	8.57%	New
Margin of victory		1,822	4.66%	▼2.25
Turnout		39,814	64.57%	▼3.43
Total valid votes		39,080		
Registered electors		61,658		▲9.88
INC gain from PSP		Swing	▼3.71	

=== Assembly Election 1967 ===
1967 Mysore State Legislative Assembly election : Kundapura
Party	Candidate	Votes	%	±%
PSP	Winnifged. E. Fernandes	18,881	51.76%	▲5.75
INC	M. M. Hegde	16,360	44.85%	▼7.72
Independent	S. Adiga	1,234	3.38%	New
Margin of victory		2,521	6.91%	▲0.35
Turnout		38,156	68.00%	▲8.74
Total valid votes		36,475		
Registered electors		56,115		▼0.24
PSP gain from INC		Swing	▼0.81	

=== Assembly Election 1962 ===
1962 Mysore State Legislative Assembly election : Kundapura
Party	Candidate	Votes	%	±%
INC	S. S. Kolkebail	16,975	52.57%	▲3.22
PSP	V. Srinivasa Shetty	14,858	46.01%	▼4.64
Independent	K. H. Suryanarayana Hande	460	1.42%	New
Margin of victory		2,117	6.56%	▲5.26
Turnout		33,331	59.26%	▲0.15
Total valid votes		32,293		
Registered electors		56,249		▲0.88
INC gain from PSP		Swing	▲1.92	

=== Assembly Election 1957 ===
1957 Mysore State Legislative Assembly election : Kundapura
Party	Candidate	Votes	%	±%
PSP	V. Srinivasa Shetty	16,693	50.65%	New
INC	Adiga Suryanarayana. K	16,266	49.35%	▼6.06
Margin of victory		427	1.30%	▼9.52
Turnout		32,959	59.11%	▼3.44
Total valid votes		32,959		
Registered electors		55,761		▼22.21
PSP gain from INC		Swing	▼4.76	

=== Assembly Election 1952 ===
1952 Madras State Legislative Assembly election : Coondapur
Party	Candidate	Votes	%	±%
INC	Manjayya Shetty	24,847	55.41%	New
Socialist	V. Srinivasa Shetty	19,994	44.59%	New
Margin of victory		4,853	10.82%	
Turnout		44,841	62.55%	
Total valid votes		44,841		
Registered electors		71,685		
INC win (new seat)				

== See also ==
- List of constituencies of the Karnataka Legislative Assembly
- Udupi district
