= Chikmagalur Assembly constituency =

Legislative Assembly constituency in Karnataka, India

Coordinates: 13.32°N 75.77°E

Chikmagalur
- Constituency No. 125 for the Karnataka Legislative Assembly

Constituency details
- Country: India
- Region: South India
- State: Karnataka
- District: Chikkamagaluru
- Lok Sabha constituency: Udupi Chikmagalur
- Established: 1961
- Total electors: 230,738
- Reservation: None

Member of Legislative Assembly
- 16th Karnataka Legislative Assembly
- Incumbent H. D. Thammaiah
- Party: Indian National Congress
- Elected year: 2023
- Preceded by: C. T. Ravi

Chikmagalur Assembly constituency is one of the 224 seats in Karnataka State Assembly in India. It is part of Udupi Chikmagalur Lok Sabha constituency.

== Members of the Legislative Assembly ==
Election	Member	Party
1957	A. M. Basava Gowda	Independent politician
1957	L. H. Thimma Bovi	Indian National Congress
1962	B. L. Subbamma	Indian National Congress
1967	C. M. S. Sasthri	Praja Socialist Party
1972	E. E. Vaz	Indian National Congress
1978	C. A. Chandre Gowda	Indian National Congress
1983	H. A. Narayana Gowda	Janata Party
1985	B. Shankara	Independent politician
1989	C. R. Sageer Ahamed	Indian National Congress
1994	C. R. Sageer Ahamed	Indian National Congress
1999	C. R. Sageer Ahamed	Indian National Congress
2004	Dr. C. T. Ravi	Bharatiya Janata Party
2008	Dr. C. T. Ravi	Bharatiya Janata Party
2013	Dr. C. T. Ravi	Bharatiya Janata Party
2018	Dr. C. T. Ravi	Bharatiya Janata Party
2023	H. D. Thammaiah	Indian National Congress

== Election results ==
=== Assembly Election 2023 ===
2023 Karnataka Legislative Assembly election : Chikmagalur
Party	Candidate	Votes	%	±%
INC	H. D. Thammaiah	85,054	50.01	▲22.36
BJP	Dr. C. T. Ravi	79,128	46.53	▲2.55
JD(S)	B. M. Thimma Shetty	1,763	1.04	▼22.74
NOTA	None of the above	849	0.50	▼0.26
Margin of victory		5,926	3.48	▼12.85
Turnout		170,832	74.04	▼0.60
Total valid votes		170,072		
Registered electors		230,738		▲6.71
INC gain from BJP		Swing	▲6.03	

=== Assembly Election 2018 ===
2018 Karnataka Legislative Assembly election : Chikmagalur
Party	Candidate	Votes	%	±%
BJP	Dr. C. T. Ravi	70,863	43.98	▼3.07
INC	Shankar. B. L	44,549	27.65	▼10.59
JD(S)	Harisha. B. H	38,317	23.78	▲3.81
Independent	M. G. Vijayakumar	1,419	0.88	New
NOTA	None of the above	1,224	0.76	New
Margin of victory		26,314	16.33	▲7.52
Turnout		161,387	74.64	▲1.85
Total valid votes		161,138		
Registered electors		216,230		▲13.11
BJP hold		Swing	▼3.07	

=== Assembly Election 2013 ===
2013 Karnataka Legislative Assembly election : Chikmagalur
Party	Candidate	Votes	%	±%
BJP	Dr. C. T. Ravi	58,683	47.05	▲6.03
INC	K. S. Shanthe Gowda	47,695	38.24	▲13.91
JD(S)	S. L. Dharme Gowda	24,913	19.97	▼8.40
KJP	Dr. K. B. Vedamurthy	3,541	2.84	New
Margin of victory		10,988	8.81	▼3.84
Turnout		139,158	72.79	▲4.77
Total valid votes		124,727		
Registered electors		191,175		▲8.95
BJP hold		Swing	▲6.03	

=== Assembly Election 2008 ===
2008 Karnataka Legislative Assembly election : Chikmagalur
Party	Candidate	Votes	%	±%
BJP	Dr. C. T. Ravi	48,915	41.02	▼17.07
JD(S)	S. L. Bhojegowda	33,831	28.37	▲21.80
INC	K. B. Mallikarjuna	29,015	24.33	▼8.48
CPI	B. Amjad	3,063	2.57	New
Independent	Parasmal. M	1,301	1.09	New
BSP	M. K. Prasanna Kumar	1,169	0.98	New
Rashtriya Hindustan Sena Karnataka	J. B. Umesh Chandra	781	0.65	New
Margin of victory		15,084	12.65	▼12.62
Turnout		119,342	68.02	▼1.25
Total valid votes		119,248		
Registered electors		175,464		▲23.27
BJP hold		Swing	▼17.07	

=== Assembly Election 2004 ===
2004 Karnataka Legislative Assembly election : Chikmagalur
Party	Candidate	Votes	%	±%
BJP	Dr. C. T. Ravi	57,165	58.09	▲28.41
INC	C. R. Sageer Ahamed	32,292	32.81	▲1.95
JD(S)	Dr. Kumarswamy. K. E	6,466	6.57	▼2.68
JP	Nagesh. K. P	2,491	2.53	New
Margin of victory		24,873	25.27	▲24.09
Turnout		98,594	69.27	▲5.67
Total valid votes		98,414		
Registered electors		142,341		▲2.11
BJP gain from INC		Swing	▲27.23	

=== Assembly Election 1999 ===
1999 Karnataka Legislative Assembly election : Chikmagalur
Party	Candidate	Votes	%	±%
INC	C. R. Sageer Ahamed	25,707	30.86	▲5.47
BJP	Dr. C. T. Ravi	24,725	29.68	▲10.34
Independent	S. L. Bhojegowda	13,384	16.07	New
JD(S)	I. B. Shankar	7,703	9.25	New
CPI	H. M. Renukaradhya	6,276	7.53	▼16.60
JD(U)	H. H. Devaraj	3,432	4.12	New
BSP	Sultan Ahmed	1,744	2.09	▼3.84
Margin of victory		982	1.18	▼0.08
Turnout		88,657	63.60	▼1.59
Total valid votes		83,311		
Rejected ballots		5,346	6.03	▲4.25
Registered electors		139,402		▲14.27
INC hold		Swing	▲5.47	

=== Assembly Election 1994 ===
1994 Karnataka Legislative Assembly election : Chikmagalur
Party	Candidate	Votes	%	±%
INC	C. R. Sageer Ahamed	19,823	25.39	▼16.30
CPI	B. K. Sundresh	18,841	24.13	▲13.07
JD	I. B. Shankar	17,702	22.68	▲8.29
BJP	T. Sridevi	15,098	19.34	New
BSP	M. D. Gangaiah	4,626	5.93	New
INC	B. M. Samad	1,506	1.93	New
Margin of victory		982	1.26	▼13.61
Turnout		79,533	65.19	▼2.17
Total valid votes		78,068		
Rejected ballots		1,417	1.78	▼5.77
Registered electors		121,995		▲0.84
INC hold		Swing	▼16.30	

=== Assembly Election 1989 ===
1989 Karnataka Legislative Assembly election : Chikmagalur
Party	Candidate	Votes	%	±%
INC	C. R. Sageer Ahamed	31,411	41.69	▲4.66
JP	S. V. Manjunath	20,209	26.82	New
JD	H. A. Narayana Gowda	10,845	14.39	New
CPI	P. V. Lokesh	8,329	11.06	New
Independent	S. Ramachandra Rao	4,166	5.53	New
Margin of victory		11,202	14.87	▲9.46
Turnout		81,491	67.36	▼0.74
Total valid votes		75,339		
Rejected ballots		6,152	7.55	▲5.81
Registered electors		120,977		▲30.70
INC gain from Independent		Swing	▼0.75	

=== Assembly Election 1985 ===
1985 Karnataka Legislative Assembly election : Chikmagalur
Party	Candidate	Votes	%	±%
Independent	B. Shankara	26,288	42.44	New
INC	C. R. Sageer Ahamed	22,938	37.03	▼0.52
JP	H. A. Narayana Gowda	11,795	19.04	▼39.61
Independent	Rajaiah	798	1.29	New
Margin of victory		3,350	5.41	▼15.70
Turnout		63,038	68.10	▲7.96
Total valid votes		61,943		
Rejected ballots		1,095	1.74	▼0.23
Registered electors		92,562		▲19.59
Independent gain from JP		Swing	▼16.21	

=== Assembly Election 1983 ===
1983 Karnataka Legislative Assembly election : Chikmagalur
Party	Candidate	Votes	%	±%
JP	H. A. Narayana Gowda	26,766	58.65	▲21.14
INC	K. R. Hiriyanna Gowda	17,134	37.55	▲31.02
BJP	M. N. Vittalacharya	1,257	2.75	New
Independent	C. M. Noorulla Shariff	476	1.04	New
Margin of victory		9,632	21.11	▲4.51
Turnout		46,552	60.14	▼10.58
Total valid votes		45,633		
Rejected ballots		919	1.97	▼1.45
Registered electors		77,400		▲9.54
JP gain from INC(I)		Swing	▲4.54	

=== Assembly Election 1978 ===
1978 Karnataka Legislative Assembly election : Chikmagalur
Party	Candidate	Votes	%	±%
INC(I)	C. A. Chandre Gowda	26,113	54.11	New
JP	B. L. Subbamma	18,102	37.51	New
INC	A. M. Ninge Gowda	3,152	6.53	▼58.62
AIADMK	P. B. S. Mani	590	1.22	New
Independent	V. Achuthan	304	0.63	New
Margin of victory		8,011	16.60	▼25.51
Turnout		49,969	70.72	▲18.56
Total valid votes		48,261		
Rejected ballots		1,708	3.42	▲3.42
Registered electors		70,658		▲9.06
INC(I) gain from INC		Swing	▼11.04	

=== Assembly Election 1972 ===
1972 Mysore State Legislative Assembly election : Chikmagalur
Party	Candidate	Votes	%	±%
INC	E. E. Vaz	21,288	65.15	▲20.47
INC(O)	C. R. Shivananda	7,528	23.04	New
Independent	B. Govinda Raju	1,834	5.61	New
ABJS	K. P. R. Prabhu	1,392	4.26	New
SWA	B. A. Krkshnegowda	485	1.48	New
Margin of victory		13,760	42.11	▲31.46
Turnout		33,794	52.16	▲3.91
Total valid votes		32,674		
Registered electors		64,791		▲27.37
INC gain from PSP		Swing	▲9.83	

=== Assembly Election 1967 ===
1967 Mysore State Legislative Assembly election : Chikmagalur
Party	Candidate	Votes	%	±%
PSP	C. M. S. Sasthri	12,397	55.32	▲26.00
INC	B. L. Subbamma	10,011	44.68	▲0.01
Margin of victory		2,386	10.65	▼4.70
Turnout		24,546	48.25	▲3.59
Total valid votes		22,408		
Registered electors		50,869		▼3.62
PSP gain from INC		Swing	▲10.65	

=== Assembly Election 1962 ===
1962 Mysore State Legislative Assembly election : Chikmagalur
Party	Candidate	Votes	%	±%
INC	B. L. Subbamma	9,717	44.67	▼1.28
PSP	C. M. S. Sasthri	6,378	29.32	▲14.28
Independent	Sannegowda	5,656	26.00	New
Margin of victory		3,339	15.35	▲12.94
Turnout		23,570	44.66	▲1.54
Total valid votes		21,751		
Registered electors		52,779		▼39.44
INC gain from Independent		Swing	▲19.59	

=== Assembly Election 1957 ===
1957 Mysore State Legislative Assembly election : Chikmagalur
Party	Candidate	Votes	%	±%
Independent	A. M. Basava Gowda	18,851	25.08	New
INC	L. H. Thimma Bovi	17,495	23.28	New
INC	M. Huche Gowda	17,041	22.67	New
Independent	G. Puttaswamy	7,236	9.63	New
PSP	B. M. Laxmana Gowda	6,250	8.32	New
PSP	D. Ningaiah	5,051	6.72	New
Independent	M. V. Gurubasappasetty	3,239	4.31	New
Margin of victory		1,810	2.41	
Turnout		75,163	43.12	
Total valid votes		75,163		
Registered electors		87,154		
Independent win (new seat)				

== See also ==
- Chikkamagaluru district
- List of constituencies of Karnataka Legislative Assembly
