= P. Ranganath Shenoy =

Indian politician

P. Ranganath Shenoy was an Indian politician of Indian National Congress. He represented the Udupi (Lok Sabha constituency) in the fifth Lok Sabha
