= Kota Srinivas Poojary =

Indian politician

Kota Shrinivas Poojari

Leader of the Opposition Karnataka Legislative Council
- In office 25 December 2023 – 4 June 2024
- Preceded by: B. K. Hariprasad
- Succeeded by: Chalavadi Narayanaswamy

Minister of Social Welfare Government of Karnataka
- In office 4 August 2021 – 13 May 2023
- Chief Minister: Basavaraj Bommai
- Preceded by: B. Sriramulu

Minister of Backward Classes Welfare Government of Karnataka
- In office 21 January 2021 – 13 May 2023
- Chief Minister: B. S. Yediyurappa; Basavaraj Bommai
- Preceded by: B. Sriramulu

Minister of Muzrai Government of Karnataka
- In office 20 August 2019 – 28 July 2021
- Chief Minister: B. S. Yediyurappa
- Preceded by: P. T. Parameshwar Naik
- Succeeded by: Shashikala Annasaheb Jolle
- In office 12 July 2012 – 13 May 2013
- Chief Minister: Jagadish Shettar
- Preceded by: J. Krishna Palemar
- Succeeded by: Rudrappa Lamani

Minister of Fisheries Government of Karnataka
- In office 20 August 2019 – 21 January 2021
- Chief Minister: B. S. Yediyurappa
- Preceded by: Venkatrao Nadagouda
- Succeeded by: Angara S.

Minister of Ports & Inland Transport Government of Karnataka
- In office 20 August 2019 – 21 January 2021
- Chief Minister: B. S. Yediyurappa
- Preceded by: R. B. Timmapur
- Succeeded by: Angara S.
- In office 12 July 2012 – 13 May 2013
- Chief Minister: Jagadish Shettar
- Preceded by: J. Krishna Palemar
- Succeeded by: H. C. Mahadevappa

Leader of the House Karnataka Legislative Council
- In office 20 August 2019 – 3 July 2023
- Preceded by: Jayamala
- Succeeded by: N. S. Boseraju

Member of Karnataka Legislative Council
- In office 26 June 2008 – 4 June 2024
- Preceded by: Blasius D'Souza
- Succeeded by: Kishore B.R.
- Constituency: Dakshina Kannada Local Authorities

Member of Parliament, Lok Sabha
- Incumbent
- Assumed office 4 June 2024
- Preceded by: Shobha Karandlaje
- Constituency: Udupi Chikmagalur

Personal details
- Born: Kota Shrinivas Poojari; 15 November 1959 (age 66) Kotathattu, Mysore State, India

Kota Shrinivas Poojari is an Indian Bharatiya Janata Party politician hailing from Kota, Karnataka. He served as the Minister of Social Welfare Department and Backward Classes Welfare Department of Karnataka from 2021 to 2023. He was also the Leader of the House, Karnataka Legislative Council and the COVID-19 Management District in-charge Minister for Kodagu. He has been appointed the BJP National Executive Committee member from 7 October 2021.

Poojari handled several crucial posts in Karnataka politics. He was first elected to the Karnataka Legislative Council for a term from 6 January 2010 to 4 January 2016 representing the Dakshina Kannada Local Authorities Constituency and was re-elected for the term from 6 January 2016 to 5 January 2022. He served as the Leader of Opposition, Karnataka Legislative Council from 7 February 2018 to 26 July 2019. During the tenure of the previous cabinet under B. S Yediyurappa as the Chief Minister, he handled the portfolios of Minister of Muzrai from 20 August 2019 to 28 July 2021, Minister of Ports & Inland Transport and Minister of Fisheries from 20 August 2019 to 21 January 2021 and Minister of Backward Class Welfare from 21 January 2021 to 28 July 2021.

== Early life ==
Poojari was born on 15 November 1959 in Kotathattu, Karnataka to a Kannada-speaking Billava Family of Annayya and Lacchi Poojari as the youngest among their three children. He completed upper primary schooling till grade seven and then initially started to work at a provisional store to support his family. After a few years, while his family received agricultural land from the government, he started the vocation of farming which he continues. He has been an active voice in raising the local issues faced by his village since a very young age and used to frequently write columns in newspapers to draw the government's attention to these problems. At that time, writers of columns were also asked to send photographs for their articles and this prompted Shri Poojari to purchase a camera and learn photography. He then opened up a photo studio "Swathi" in his village and pursued the profession for several years. It was during his stint with photography that he had taken an iconic picture of the acclaimed novelist Shri Kota Shivaram Karantha batting on the cricket field on the occasion of a cricket tournament inauguration in Kota. This picture is widely used in several articles and documentaries about the writer. Even during his life as a photographer, he continued engaging in raising people's struggles and tribulations ensuring that their requests are heard and heeded. A prominent instance of his intervention is while the people of Kodi-Hosabengre region faced severe drinking water scarcity, he coordinated the women from the region and staged a strong protest at the District Administration office which led to the administration yielding to their petition.

== Political career ==
Poojari began his political career in 1993 as a member of the Gram Panchayat. In 1996, he was elected as a member of the Taluk Panchayat and in 2006 as a member of the Zilla Panchayat. During his term at the Panchayat, he undertook initiatives such as building the Dr Shivaram Karanth theme park in memory of the Kannada novelist Shivaram Karanth and instituting the Dr Shivaram Karantha Huttoora Prashasti, an award presented to recognise exceptional services or performance. Poojari was a frequent writer of articles in the newspaper Mungaru Pathrike. He led the fight for distribution of Sec 94C title deeds to people by organising a "Padayatra" across the Udupi district and petitioned to the Assistant Commissioner's office. He was also at the forefront of the protests in Udupi district against the inadequate sand laws.

In the following years, Poojari worked in several positions of the Karnataka State BJP. In 2009, he was elected for the first time to the Karnataka Legislative Council. He served as the Minister of Ports & Inland Transport and Minister of Muzrai from July 2012 to May 2013 in the cabinet of the then Chief Minister, Jagadish Shettar. Poojari is widely regarded as a simple and uncorrupt politician admired for his oratory skills and service oriented initiatives. In 2021, allegations were leveled against Poojary over his construction of an expensive house. He responded by writing to the Karnataka Lokayukta to probe the charges against him.
