= Sowkoor Jayaprakash Shetty =

Indian lawyer and politician (1935–2015)

- Born: April 12, 1935
- Died: September 7, 2015 (aged 80)
- Occupations: Politician; lawyer
- Spouse: Visalakshi Shetty

Sowkoor Jayaprakash Shetty (April 12, 1935 – September 7, 2015) was an Indian lawyer and politician who was elected as a member of the Karnataka Legislative Assembly from 1967 to 1971 representing Brahmavar. Shetty was born on April 12, 1935, to B. Narayana Shetty, an eminent lawyer, and Rukmini N. Shetty. Shetty was elected as an independent MLA into the Legislative Assembly in 1967 from Brahmavara constituency with a large majority. After retiring from politics at the end of his term, Shetty was involved in activism. He was married to the late Dr. Vishalakshi Shetty. Jayaprakash Shetty died from a prolonged illness on September 7, 2015.
