= Greater Udupi =

City in Karnataka, India

Greater Udupi is the fast growing city in Karnataka State.Greater Udupi is the proposed extension of Municipal Limits of Udupi City Municipal Council. Greater Udupi which will be formed by merging adjacent villages surrounding Udupi city is proposed by the Government of Karnataka and declared by ex- Deputy Commissioner of Udupi District, V. Ponnuraj.

Areas covered by Udupi Urban Development Authority will be brought under Greater Udupi and will be provided with better infrastructure and roads will be widened. From this expansion Udupi is expected to be upgraded into a City Corporation by 2025 after the population of the city exceeds 3.0 lakhs( approx. 2.5 lakhs at present 2010).
