= S. K. Amin =

Indian politician

Seetharam K. Amin

Member of the Mysore Legislative Assembly for Udupi
- In office 1967–1972

Personal details
- Born: June 6, 1917 Mangalore, Karnataka
- Died: September 13, 1995 (aged 78) Mangalore, Karnataka
- Party: Indian National Congress
- Other political affiliations: Congress (O)

Seetharam Koosayya Amin (6 June 1917 – 13 September 1995) was an Indian freedom fighter and Congress politician who was active in the fisherfolk cooperative movement.

== Biography ==
In 1954 he helped establish the S.K. & Udupi Dist. Co-operative Fish Marketing Federation Ltd. In the 1967 Mysore Legislative Assembly election he successfully contested the Udupi constituency with 33.35% of the vote. In the 1972 Assembly election he contested the seat of Mangalore I for the Indian National Congress (Organisation), placing fourth with 14.52% of the vote. In 1990, he received Karnataka's second highest civilian award, the Rajyotsava Prashasthi, for services to the state's co-operative movement.
