= School of Social Work Roshni Nilaya =

College of social work in India

Coordinates: 12.8629°N 74.8574°E

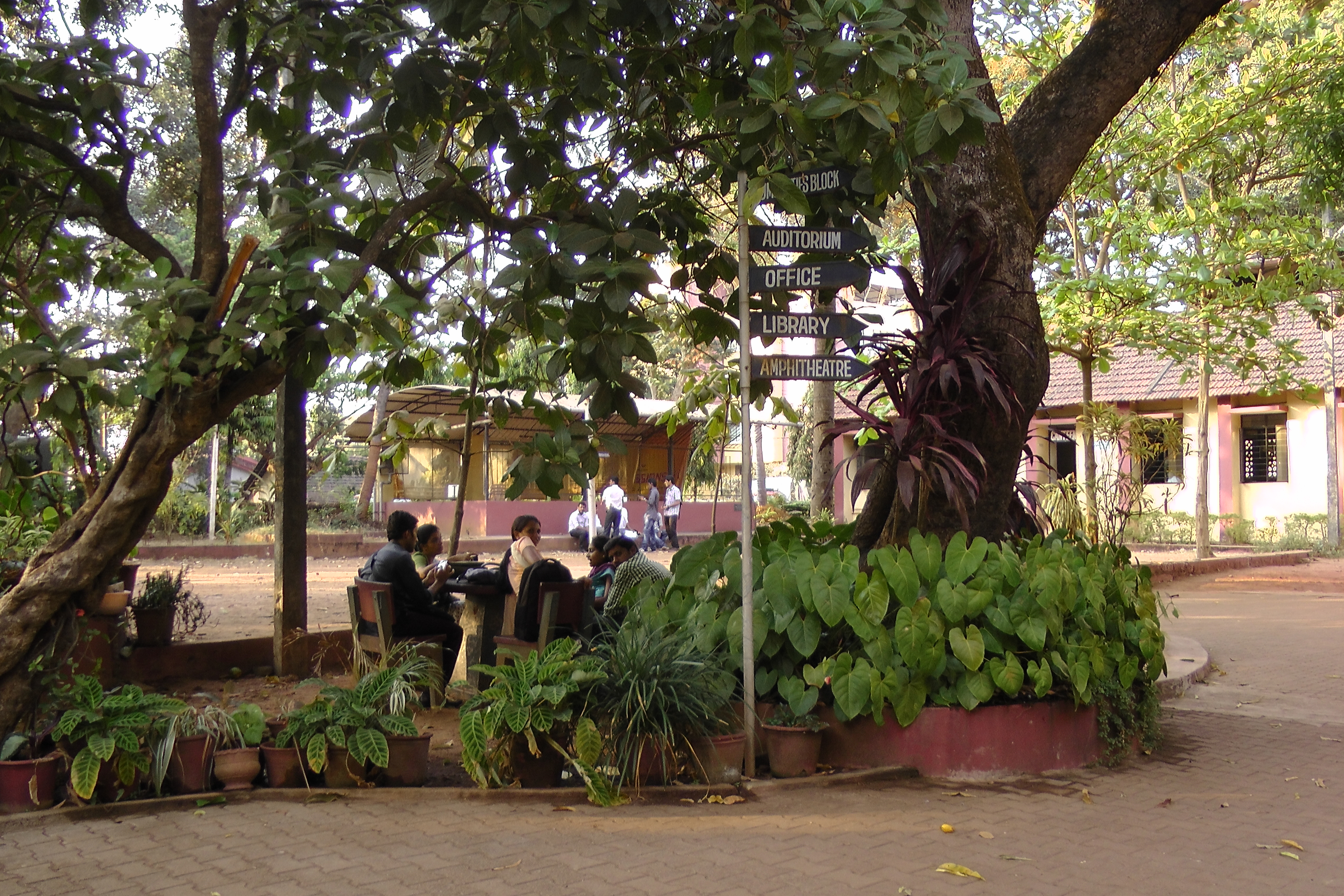
View of the campus

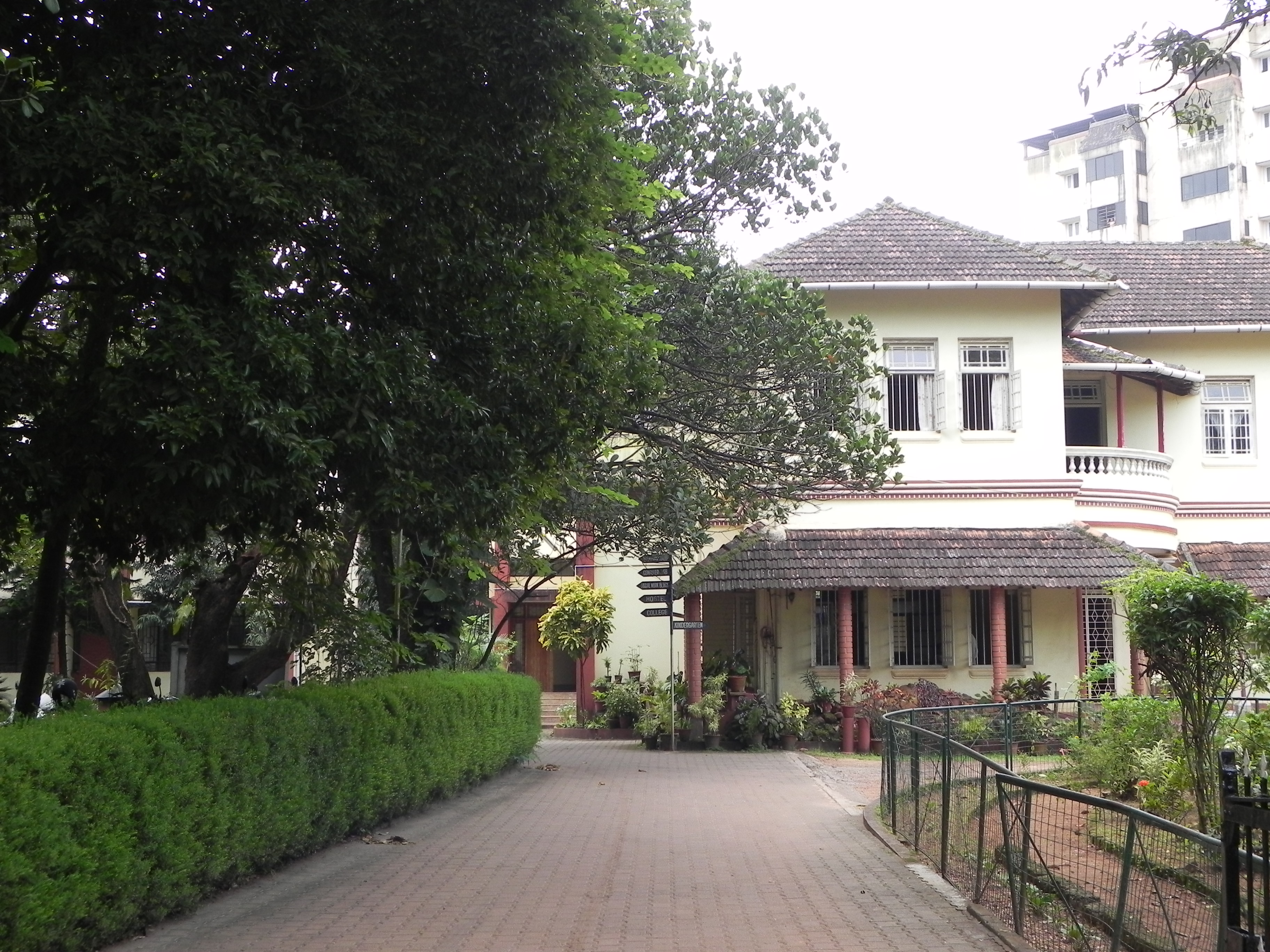
http://www.sswroshni.in/

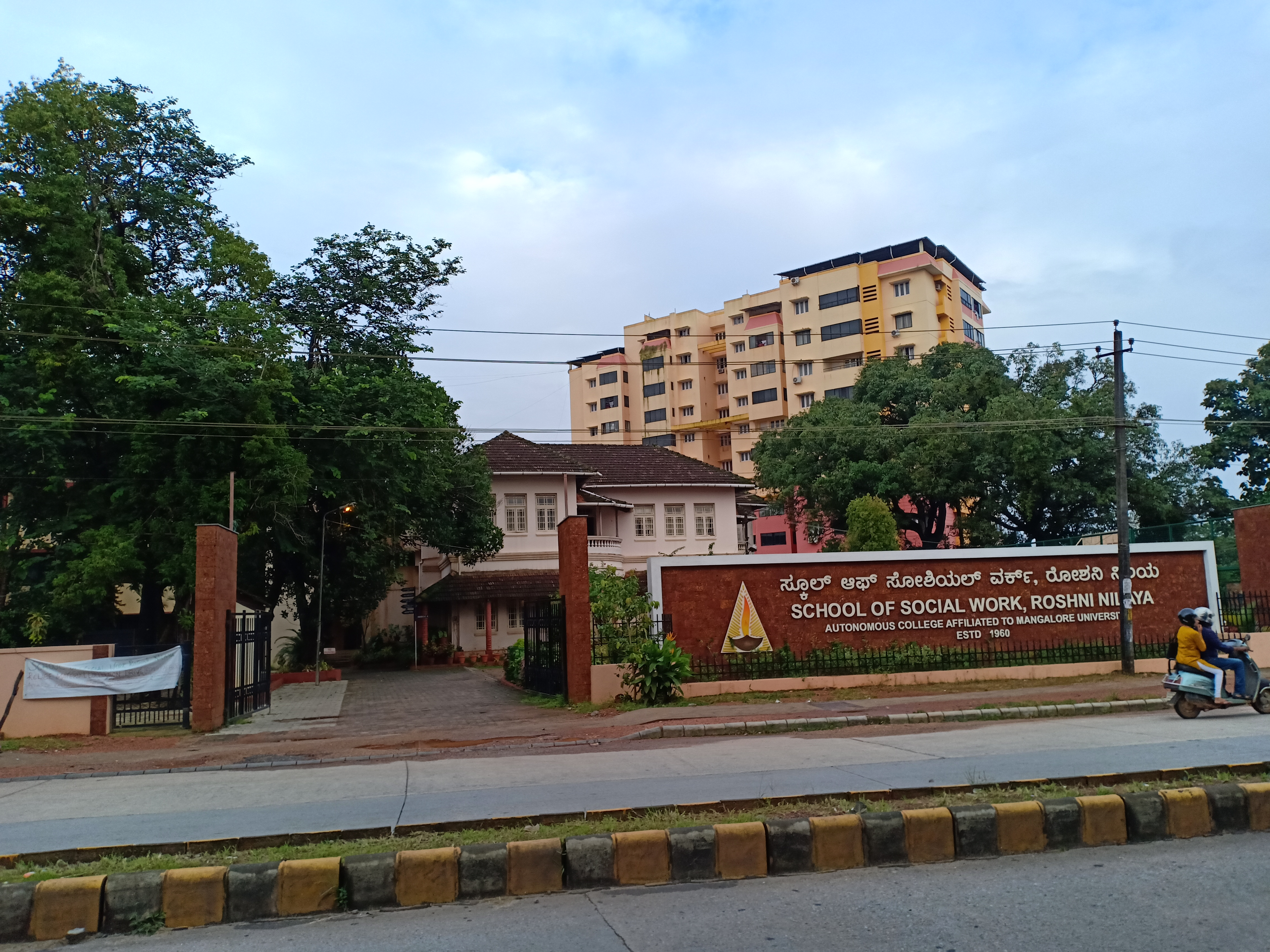
View from Father Muller's Road

The School of Social Work Roshni Nilaya is a college of social work in Mangalore, Karnataka, India. It is managed by the Institute of Social Service Mangalore of Karnataka State. It is on a six-acre campus, where there are also services such as a kindergarten, Family Service Agency, a family counselling centre and Childline.

== History ==
The college was set up in 1960 in Mangalore by the Society of Daughters of the Heart of Mary, an international Catholic society. It was the first centre for social work education in Karnataka.

== Current ==
The College was affiliated to Mangalore University, becoming autonomous from 2007. The National Assessment and Accreditation Council established by the University Grants Commission to assess and accredit institutions of higher education in the country, has re-accredited the college at the 'A' level and the institution celebrated 75 years of social work education in India.

== Library and research centres ==
Adelaide Library has separate floors for undergraduate and postgraduates, with a separate section for doctoral students. E-learning facilities are provided in the library. It has 31,965 books and 103 subscribed Journals. It has a documentation centre with files of seminar papers, audio-visuals and newspaper clippings.

The college has a department of research with a staff member trained in research methodology and statistics to undertake sponsored research projects and to provide technical guidance to research scholars and to students. The department of research has completed several research projects for the Government of India, State Governments, University, Industries, Banks, NGOs and Health Care Institutions.

== Notable students ==
- Shobha Karandlaje, politician
