= C. T. Ravi =

Indian politician

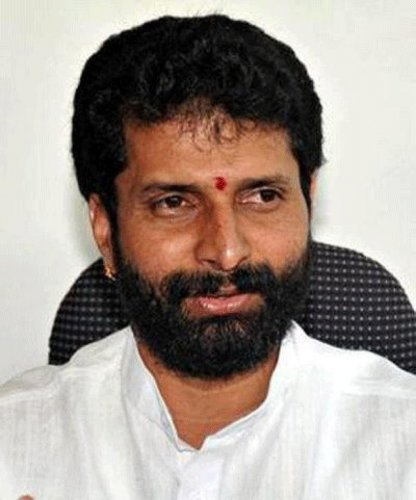

National General Secretary of Bharatiya Janata Party
- In office 26 September 2020 – 29 July 2023
- President: J. P. Nadda

Member of Karnataka Legislative Council
- Incumbent
- Assumed office 24 June 2024
- Preceded by: N. Ravikumar
- Constituency: Karnataka Legislative Council

Minister of Tourism Government of Karnataka
- In office 20 August 2019 – 4 October 2020
- Chief Minister: B. S. Yediyurappa
- Preceded by: S. R. Mahesh
- Succeeded by: C. P. Yogeeshwara

Minister of Kannada & Culture Government of Karnataka
- In office 20 August 2019 – 4 October 2020
- Chief Minister: B. S. Yediyurappa
- Preceded by: D. K. Shivakumar
- Succeeded by: Arvind Limbavali

Minister of Youth Empowerment & Sports Government of Karnataka
- In office 10 February 2020 – 4 October 2020
- Chief Minister: B. S. Yediyurappa
- Preceded by: K. S. Eshwarappa
- Succeeded by: Narayana Gowda

Minister of Sugarcane Development & Sugar Government of Karnataka
- In office 27 September 2019 – 10 February 2020
- Chief Minister: B. S. Yediyurappa
- Preceded by: R. B. Timmapur
- Succeeded by: Arbail Shivaram Hebbar

Minister of Higher Education Government of Karnataka
- In office 12 July 2012 – 13 May 2013
- Chief Minister: Jagadish Shettar
- Preceded by: V. S. Acharya
- Succeeded by: R. V. Deshpande

Member of Karnataka Legislative Assembly
- In office 2004–2023
- Preceded by: C. R. Sageer Ahamed
- Succeeded by: H D Tammaiah
- Constituency: Chikmagalur

Personal details
- Born: 18 July 1967 (age 59) Chikkamagaluru, Mysore State (now Karnataka), India
- Party: Bharatiya Janata Party
- Spouse: Pallavi
- Children: 2
- Education: Bachelor of Arts IDSG College Chikkamagaluru
- Website: ctravi.org

Dr. Chikkamagaravalli Thimme Gowda Ravi (born 18 July 1967) is an Indian politician who was the former National General Secretary of Bharatiya Janata Party and a four-time legislator from Chikmagalur Constituency of Karnataka State from 2004 to 2023. He was a cabinet minister in the Government of Karnataka.He resigned his post as the cabinet minister after being appointed the National General secretary of Bharatiya Janata Party.

== Politics ==
Ravi was a four-time legislator from Chiikamagaluru assembly seat of Karnataka. He has been at the forefront of Hindutva movement in coastal Karnataka.

=== Early political career ===
Ravi was a BJP Karnataka Yuva Morcha (the party Youth Wing) President. Later, Rajnath Singh made him Special Invitee and he went on to become the State General Secretary of the party. He also represented the party in press conferences.

=== Elections ===
He unsuccessfully contested against C. R. Sageer Ahamed of Congress in 1999 Karnataka Legislative Assembly elections. He lost by 982 votes.

In the 2004 Karnataka Legislative Assembly elections, C. T. Ravi defeated C. R. Sageer Ahamed by a margin of more than 25,000 Votes in Chikmagalur, thus marking C. T. Ravi's entry to Karnataka Legislature.

When Karnataka Legislative Assembly was dissolved in 2007 and Karnataka went to polls in April–May 2008, he was again fielded by BJP from Chikmagalur Constituency and won.

In 2023 his winning streak came to an end when his once own aide H D Tammaiah (who had shifted from BJP to INC just months before) defeated him in the Assembly Elections.

=== Minister For Karnataka government ===
In 2012 he was named Higher Education Minister. In the post he dealt with Dakshina Kannada, Chikkamagaluru district education and other development projects and he served as the Minister of Tourism and Kannada language in the Fourth B. S. Yeddyurappa ministry and was also Minister of Sports and Youth from January 2020 and resigned on 4 October 2020.

When addressing party workers in Chikkamagalur, Ravi made derogatory statements. In Kannada, he associated those who resist or do not vote for Modi to a word that belittles women on April 14, 2019. The committee led by State Women's Congress President Dr. B. Pushpa Amarnath complained to the National Commission for Women.

== Legal proceedings ==
=== 2011 land scam case ===
An FIR was filed against Ravi by Lokayukta police for allegedly being involved in a land scam after a complaint from a municipal councillor. The complainant claimed that Ravi got allotted three civic amenities sites in his wife's name in favour of the Anjaneya Education Society, run by his relatives by giving fake documents for ₹12.09 lakh while the market value was over ₹5 crore. However authorities claimed that there was no education society registered in the name of his wife and he got the land for a school which did not even exist.

The complainant also accused Ravi of getting two other residential sites allotted in his wife's name in Chikamagalur "using his position as an MLA, by adopting backdoor methods".

=== 2012 Disproportionate assets case ===
In 2012, a RTI activist A.C. Kumar of Chikkamagaluru filed a private lawsuit blaming Ravi of having assets disproportionally large to his documented revenue sources from 2004 to 2010. He stated that in this period, his known revenue sources were ₹ 49 lakh, while his assets were ₹ 3.18 crore. In 2015, the Supreme Court gave guidelines regulating petitioners to file affidavits in support of their allegations or complaints, Ravi asked the high court to dismiss the whole prosecution on the basis that the petitioner did not file an affidavit. In order to give the petitioner, AC Kumar, a chance to file an affidavit in support of his accusations made against Ravi, the high court sent the case back to the special court.

== Controversies ==
About 30 lecturers staged protest against Ravi in a resort in Yalahanka where Ravi was staying in August 2015 claiming that he had cheated them of their money. The protestors claimed that Ravi who was higher education minister collected money from them promising permanent jobs in aided diploma colleges. They claimed that they had lost both their money and jobs and demanded a refund. They also raised slogans against Ravi. The BJP leaders quickly jolted the protesters inside the resort when they saw media persons approaching.

=== Hate Speeches ===
C T Ravi received a notice from the Election Commission for his 'inflammatory' speech at the Sakleshpur election rally in Hassan district on 6 April 2009.

The Karnataka High Court in March 2018 ordered issuance of notices to Union minister Anant Kumar Hegde and MLA C.T. Ravi alleging that the two BJP leaders made provocative speeches inciting communal violence during November 2017.

=== Car wreck incident ===
Two youngsters were killed and three others were injured when an SUV car in which C.T. Ravi was travelling crashed into two cars parked by the side of the road on Tumakuru district on February 19, 2019. One of the drivers of the cars that were hit claimed that Ravi threatened him. The locals blamed Ravi for the wreck, claiming that he was driving the car himself at a very high speed. Though reports also stated that Ravi was driving the car while drunk, Karnataka BJP's state unit claimed that Ravi was not driving the car. The police booked Ravi's driver on charges of rash and negligent driving. Many locals accused Ravi of not respecting the sentiments of families of the deceased. Relatives and friends of the dead staged a protest against Ravi on the hospital premises demanding justice.

== Political positions ==
=== Halal food ===
Members of the right-wing Hindutva groups in India have protested against the sale of Halal food in India. Bajrang Dal, Vishwa Hindu Parishad and other Hindutva groups were running door to door campaign in Karnataka, asking people not to purchase Halal meat. In March 2022 the Hindutva group Bajrang Dal physically attacked a Muslim meat seller, five persons were arrested in the incident. In March 2022, the Hindutva ruling party, BJP national general secretary C. T. Ravi had called halal food as "economic jihad".
