= H. D. Thammaiah =

Indian politician (born 1968)

H. D. Thammaiah (born 1968) is an Indian politician from Karnataka. He is an MLA from Chikmagalur Assembly constituency in Chikmagalur district representing Indian National Congress. He won the 2023 Karnataka Legislative Assembly election.

== Early life and education ==
Thammaiah is from Chikmagalur, Karnataka. He is the son of Degundappa. He did his pre university course at Government Primary College, Chikkamagaluru passing out in 1986. He belongs to Lingayat community.

== Career ==
Thammaiah won from Chikmagalur Assembly constituency representing Indian National Congress in the 2023 Karnataka Legislative Assembly election. He polled 85,054 votes and defeated his nearest rival, C. T. Ravi of Bharatiya Janata Party, by a margin of 5,926 votes. He joined the Congress party just a few days before the election but managed to garner the support of the Congress cadre.
