= K. Raghupati Bhat =

Indian politician

Member of Karnataka Legislative Assembly
- In office 2018–2023
- Preceded by: Pramod Madhwaraj
- Succeeded by: Yashpal Anand Suvarna
- Constituency: Udupi
- In office 2004–2013
- Preceded by: U. R. Sabhapati
- Succeeded by: Pramod Madhwaraj
- Constituency: Udupi

Personal details
- Born: 24 February 1969 (age 57) Karmballi, Udupi
- Party: Bharatiya Janata Party

K. Raghupati Bhat (born 24 February 1969) is an Indian politician and a former three-term member of the Karnataka Legislative Assembly representing the Udupi Assembly constituency.

== Political career ==
After the delimitation exercise carried out in the year 2008 by the Election Commission of India, the Udupi assembly constituency number was changed to 120. Assuming office at this time, Bhat was member of Thirteenth Karnataka Legislative Assembly from 30 May 2008 to 5 May 2013, representing the Udupi constituency. He was member of Fifteenth Karnataka Legislative Assembly (M.L.A) from Udupi constituency from 2018 to 2023, after defeating Pramod Madhwaraj in the Karnataka state assembly elections held in 2018. Bhat is a member of the Bharatiya Janata Party (BJP).

Bhat started in politics as a member of BJP. He was elected to the Udupi municipal council, and he was also the president of district BJP Yuva morcha (Youth wing).
