= Kiran Kumar Kodgi =

Indian politician (born 1963)

Kiran Kumar Kodgi (born 1963) is an Indian politician from Karnataka. He is an MLA from Kundapura Assembly constituency in Udupi district. He won the 2023 Karnataka Legislative Assembly election representing Bharatiya Janata Party.

== Early life and education ==
Kumar is from Baindur, Udupi district. His father is Gopalakrishna Kodgi. He is a B.Sc. graduate. He is a follower of Halady Srinivas Shetty, a five time BJP MLA, whom he replaced after Shetty announced his retirement from active politics.

== Career ==
Kumar won from Kundapura Assembly constituency representing Bharatiya Janata Party in the 2023 Karnataka Legislative Assembly election. He polled 102,424 votes and defeated his nearest rival, Dinesh Hegde Molahalli of Indian National Congress, by a margin of 41,556 votes.
