= Kotathattu =

- village
- Interactive map of Kotathattu
- Coordinates: 13°31′11″N 74°42′22″E
- Country: India
- State: Karnataka
- District: Udupi
- Talukas: Udupi

Government
  - Body: Gram panchayat

Population (2001)
  - Total: 5,263

Languages
  - Official: Kannada
- Time zone: UTC+5:30 (IST)
- ISO 3166 code: IN-KA
- Vehicle registration: KA
- Website: karnataka.gov.in

Kotathattu is a village in the southern state of Karnataka, India. It is located in the Udupi taluk of Udupi district in Karnataka.

== Demographics ==
As of 2001 India census, Kotathattu had a population of 5263 with 2452 males and 2811 females.

== See also ==
- Udupi
- Districts of Karnataka
