= Udupi Lok Sabha constituency =

Former constituency of the Indian parliament in Karnataka

Coordinates: 13.3°N 74.8°E

Udupi
- Former Lok Sabha constituency

Constituency details
- Country: India
- Region: South India
- State: Karnataka
- Established: 1957
- Abolished: 2008

Udupi Lok Sabha constituency was a former Lok Sabha constituency in Karnataka, India. This seat came into existence in 1957. With the implementation of the delimitation of parliamentary constituencies in 2008, it ceased to exist.

== History ==
The former Constituency of Udupi Lok Sabha constituency was South Kanara (North) Lok Sabha constituency, which came into existence in 1951. With the implementation of States Reorganisation Act, 1956, it ceased to exist. After South Canara District of erstwhile Madras State got merged with Mysore State in 1956, that seat ceased to exist and was replaced by Udipi Lok Sabha constituency.

== Assembly segments ==
Udupi Lok Sabha constituency comprised the following eight Karnataka Legislative Assembly segments:

1. Bantwal
2. Surathkal
3. Kaup
4. Udupi
5. Brahmavar
6. Kundapur
7. Baindur
8. Moodabidri

The Legislative Assembly segments of Baindur, Kundapur, Brahmavar, Udupi, and Kaup were in Udupi district, and the Legislative Assembly constituencies of Moodabidri, Surathkal and Bantwal were in Dakshina Kannada district. After delimitation process done by Election Commission of India in 2008 A.D., Baindur became part of Shimoga constituency and Brahmavar ceased to exist.

== Members of Parliament ==
Year	Member	Party
1952: See South Kanara (North)
1957	Ullal Srinivas Mallya	Indian National Congress
1962	Ullal Srinivas Mallya	Indian National Congress
1967	J. M. Lobo Prabhu	Swatantra Party
1971	P. Ranganath Shenoy	Indian National Congress
1977	T. A. Pai	Indian National Congress
1980	Oscar Fernandes	Indian National Congress
1984	Oscar Fernandes	Indian National Congress
1989	Oscar Fernandes	Indian National Congress
1991	Oscar Fernandes	Indian National Congress
1996	Oscar Fernandes	Indian National Congress
1998	I. M. Jayarama Shetty	Bharatiya Janata Party
1999	Vinay Kumar Sorake	Indian National Congress
2004	Manorama Madhwaraj	Bharatiya Janata Party
2008 onwards : See Udupi-Chikamagalur

== See also ==
- Udupi Chikmagalur Lok Sabha constituency
- South Kanara (North) Lok Sabha constituency
- South Kanara (South) Lok Sabha constituency
- Mangalore Lok Sabha constituency
- Udupi district
- List of former constituencies of the Lok Sabha
