= K. Jayaprakash Hegde =

Indian politician (born 1952)

Member of Parliament
- In office 2012–2014
- Preceded by: D. V. Sadananda Gowda
- Succeeded by: Shobha Karandlaje
- Constituency: Udupi Chikmagalur

Minister for Ports and Fisheries, Karnataka
- In office 1994–1996
- Constituency: Brahmavar

Member of Karnataka Legislative Assembly
- In office 1994–2008
- Preceded by: P. Basavaraj
- Succeeded by: Constituency abolished
- Constituency: Brahmavar

Personal details
- Born: 16 October 1952 (age 73) Korgi, Kundapura Taluk, Karnataka, Indian
- Website: jayaprakashhegde.com

Korgi Jayaprakash Hegde is an Indian politician who has been a Minister in the Government of Karnataka. He is the Chairman of the Karnataka Backward Class Commission. As Minister in charge of undivided Mangalore and Chikmagalur, in 1997, he is the reason for the creation of Udupi district, from undivided Mangalore and Udupi. He was also a Member of India's Parliament representing Udupi Chikmagalur.

== Bio ==
Born in Korgi, Kundapura taluk, Udupi district, Jayaprakash Hegde is a practising advocate and entered politics very early in his life. He has been elected thrice to the Karnataka Legislative Assembly as an independent candidate from the Brahmavar constituency and served as Minister holding the portfolio of Ports and Fisheries. He is married to Veena Hegde and has two children, a son, Nishanth and a daughter, Divya. He was Minister in charge for undivided Mangalore and Udupi District. It is due to his fight and determination that Udupi was finally declared an independent district in 1997. When his Brahmavar constituency was divided by the central government and no longer existed, he was forced to join the Congress party for political survival. Hegde has been elected to Lok Sabha from the same constituency following a by-election in 2012. The Congress on Monday, 14 December 2015, expelled Jayaprakash Hegde, from the party for six years due to his popularity causing insecurities in Rajya Sabha MP Sri Oscar Fernandes. Jayaprakash Hegde being a worker's candidate and not a top leader's follower, faced several issues in Congress and due to his inability to obey the orders of Oscar Fernandes, he was removed from the party without notice. Standing as an independent candidate in the Dakshina Kannada constituency, he gave the Congress party a run for its money, when more than half of the party workers voted for him instead of the official Congress candidate. The Indian National Congress has not seen victory in coastal Karnataka ever since the ejection of Jayaprakash Hegde. His exit has left a big gap in leadership and team building in Coastal Karnataka Congress. He is said to be one of the cleanest politicians in the state, well respected by the general public, media and other politicians. He had successfully completed his MP term by undertaking many good things in a few months of the term, that couldn't be continued in the next terms by the other MP. Despite being out of power, he continues to do public service and brings in important projects for the constituency.
