= Brahmavar Assembly constituency =

Former Assembly constituency in Karnataka, India

Coordinates: 13.425581°N 74.756359°E

Brahmavar
- Former constituency No. 147 for the Karnataka Legislative Assembly

Constituency details
- Country: India
- Region: South India
- State: Karnataka
- Division: Mysore
- District: Udupi
- Lok Sabha constituency: Udupi
- Established: 1951
- Abolished: 2008
- Reservation: None

Brahmavar Assembly constituency was one of the constituencies in Karnataka state assembly in India until 2008 when it was made defunct. It was part of Udupi Lok Sabha constituency.

== Members of the Legislative Assembly ==
Election	Member	Party
1952	S. S. Kolkabail	Kisan Mazdoor Praja Party
1957	Shetty Jagajjeevandas	Indian National Congress
1962	S. D. Samrajya	Indian National Congress
1967	Sowkoor Jayaprakash Shetty	Independent politician
1972	Jayaprakash S. Kolkebail	Indian National Congress
1978	Ananda Kunda Hegde	Indian National Congress
1983	B. B. Shetty	Bharatiya Janata Party
1985	P. Basavaraj	Indian National Congress
1989	P. Basavaraj	Indian National Congress
1994	K. Jayaprakash Hegde	Janata Dal
1999	K. Jayaprakash Hegde	Independent politician
2004	K. Jayaprakash Hegde	Independent politician

== Election results ==
=== Assembly Election 2004 ===
2004 Karnataka Legislative Assembly election : Brahmavar
Party	Candidate	Votes	%	±%
Independent	K. Jayaprakash Hegde	39,521	40.23%	New
INC	Pramod Madawaraj	27,348	27.84%	▼4.68
BJP	Kota Srinivas Poojari	25,590	26.05%	▼2.21
JD(S)	Althar Niranjan Hegde	2,363	2.41%	▲1.32
Kannada Nadu Party	Sudhakar Shetty	2,067	2.10%	New
JP	Ramesh Hegde	1,352	1.38%	New
Margin of victory		12,173	12.39%	▲6.79
Turnout		98,288	66.39%	▼0.57
Total valid votes		98,241		
Registered electors		148,036		▲10.83
Independent hold		Swing	▲2.11	

=== Assembly Election 1999 ===
1999 Karnataka Legislative Assembly election : Brahmavar
Party	Candidate	Votes	%	±%
Independent	K. Jayaprakash Hegde	32,429	38.12%	New
INC	Sarala B. Kanchan	27,666	32.52%	▲1.63
BJP	Shirinivas Poojary	24,043	28.26%	▲8.79
JD(S)	Dayananda Shetty Kenjoor	928	1.09%	New
Margin of victory		4,763	5.60%	▼9.84
Turnout		89,445	66.96%	▼1.54
Total valid votes		85,066		
Rejected ballots		4,357	4.87%	▲3.75
Registered electors		133,573		▲8.51
Independent gain from JD		Swing	▼8.22	

=== Assembly Election 1994 ===
1994 Karnataka Legislative Assembly election : Brahmavar
Party	Candidate	Votes	%	±%
JD	K. Jayaprakash Hegde	38,633	46.34%	▲0.58
INC	P. Basavaraj	25,757	30.89%	▼20.83
BJP	B. Jagajeevandas Shetty	16,232	19.47%	New
INC	Jayarama Shetty. H. G	2,510	3.01%	New
Margin of victory		12,876	15.44%	▲9.48
Turnout		84,319	68.50%	▲0.63
Total valid votes		83,375		
Rejected ballots		944	1.12%	▼2.95
Registered electors		123,093		▼0.63
JD gain from INC		Swing	▼5.38	

=== Assembly Election 1989 ===
1989 Karnataka Legislative Assembly election : Brahmavar
Party	Candidate	Votes	%	±%
INC	P. Basavaraj	41,709	51.72%	▼1.73
JD	K. Jayaprakash Hegde	36,902	45.76%	New
JP	Masthar. B. Kushala Shetty	1,031	1.28%	New
Independent	Balakrishna. N. Shetty	998	1.24%	New
Margin of victory		4,807	5.96%	▼5.83
Turnout		84,065	67.87%	▼1.02
Total valid votes		80,640		
Rejected ballots		3,425	4.07%	▲3.34
Registered electors		123,868		▲31.80
INC hold		Swing	▼1.73	

=== Assembly Election 1985 ===
1985 Karnataka Legislative Assembly election : Brahmavar
Party	Candidate	Votes	%	±%
INC	P. Basavaraj	34,354	53.45%	▲7.36
JP	K. Jayaprakash Hegde	26,776	41.66%	▲35.50
BJP	Mabukala Krishna Kini	3,141	4.89%	▼42.86
Margin of victory		7,578	11.79%	▲10.13
Turnout		64,743	68.89%	▼0.03
Total valid votes		64,271		
Rejected ballots		472	0.73%	▼1.07
Registered electors		93,981		▲10.42
INC gain from BJP		Swing	▲5.70	

=== Assembly Election 1983 ===
1983 Karnataka Legislative Assembly election : Brahmavar
Party	Candidate	Votes	%	±%
BJP	B. B. Shetty	27,504	47.75%	New
INC	P. Basavaraj	26,550	46.09%	▲42.87
JP	Sudher Kanchan	3,551	6.16%	▼38.26
Margin of victory		954	1.66%	▼3.20
Turnout		58,662	68.92%	▼6.27
Total valid votes		57,605		
Rejected ballots		1,057	1.80%	▼0.27
Registered electors		85,110		▲6.42
BJP gain from INC(I)		Swing	▼1.53	

=== Assembly Election 1978 ===
1978 Karnataka Legislative Assembly election : Brahmavar
Party	Candidate	Votes	%	±%
INC(I)	Ananda Kunda Hegde	29,021	49.28%	New
JP	V. S. Acharya	26,158	44.42%	New
INC	B. Kushala Shetty	1,899	3.22%	▼55.06
Independent	Nadur Seetharama	1,807	3.07%	New
Margin of victory		2,863	4.86%	▼33.02
Turnout		60,131	75.19%	▲10.57
Total valid votes		58,885		
Rejected ballots		1,246	2.07%	▲2.07
Registered electors		79,972		▲30.97
INC(I) gain from INC		Swing	▼9.00	

=== Assembly Election 1972 ===
1972 Mysore State Legislative Assembly election : Brahmavar
Party	Candidate	Votes	%	±%
INC	Jayaprakash S. Kolkebail	22,421	58.28%	▲30.65
INC(O)	M. M. Hegde	7,846	20.39%	New
ABJS	K. Mahabaleshwara Adiga	6,360	16.53%	New
Independent	Perody Vittal Shetty	1,845	4.80%	New
Margin of victory		14,575	37.88%	▲2.62
Turnout		39,458	64.62%	▼4.03
Total valid votes		38,472		
Registered electors		61,063		▲10.34
INC gain from Independent		Swing	▼4.61	

=== Assembly Election 1967 ===
1967 Mysore State Legislative Assembly election : Brahmavar
Party	Candidate	Votes	%	±%
Independent	Sowkoor Jayaprakash Shetty	22,551	62.89%	New
INC	F. X. D. Pinto	9,909	27.63%	▼25.84
PSP	B. S. Lewis	2,180	6.08%	▼19.24
Independent	P. Halambi	1,217	3.39%	New
Margin of victory		12,642	35.26%	▲7.11
Turnout		37,993	68.65%	▲11.14
Total valid votes		35,857		
Registered electors		55,342		▲8.57
Independent gain from INC		Swing	▲9.42	

=== Assembly Election 1962 ===
1962 Mysore State Legislative Assembly election : Brahmavar
Party	Candidate	Votes	%	±%
INC	S. D. Samrajya	14,601	53.47%	▼8.46
PSP	Sheenappa Shetty	6,915	25.32%	▼12.75
ABJS	K. Mahabaleshwara Adiga	5,790	21.20%	New
Margin of victory		7,686	28.15%	▲4.29
Turnout		29,314	57.51%	▲3.67
Total valid votes		27,306		
Registered electors		50,972		▲0.18
INC hold		Swing	▼8.46	

=== Assembly Election 1957 ===
1957 Mysore State Legislative Assembly election : Brahmavar
Party	Candidate	Votes	%	±%
INC	Shetty Jagajjeevandas	16,964	61.93%	▲13.69
PSP	Sheenappa Shetty	10,429	38.07%	New
Margin of victory		6,535	23.86%	▲20.33
Turnout		27,393	53.84%	▼13.99
Total valid votes		27,393		
Registered electors		50,882		▼21.37
INC gain from KMPP		Swing	▲10.17	

=== Assembly Election 1952 ===
1952 Madras State Legislative Assembly election : Brahmavar
Party	Candidate	Votes	%	±%
KMPP	S. S. Kolkabail	22,719	51.76%	New
INC	Shetty Jagjeevandoss	21,171	48.24%	New
Margin of victory		1,548	3.53%	
Turnout		43,890	67.83%	
Total valid votes		43,890		
Registered electors		64,709		
KMPP win (new seat)				

== See also ==
- List of constituencies of the Karnataka Legislative Assembly
