= South Kanara (North) Lok Sabha constituency =

Former constituency of the Indian parliament in Madras State

Coordinates: 13.1°N 75.1°E

South Kanara (North)
- Former Lok Sabha constituency

Constituency details
- Country: India
- Region: South India
- State: Karnataka
- Established: 1952
- Abolished: 1956
- Reservation: None

South Kanara (North) Lok Sabha constituency was a former Lok Sabha constituency in Madras State. This seat came into existence in 1951. With the implementation of States Reorganisation Act, 1956, it ceased to exist.

== Assembly segments ==
South Kanara (North) Lok Sabha constituency comprised the following five Legislative Assembly segments:

1. Udipi (Udupi)
2. Brahmavar
3. Coondapur (Kundapur)
4. Karkal
5. Mulky (Mulki)

After South Canara District of erstwhile Madras State got merged with Mysore State in 1956, this seat ceased to exist and was replaced by Udipi Lok Sabha constituency.

Later in 1978, the Legislative Assembly segments of Baindur, Kundapur, Brahmavar, Udupi, and Kaup were in Udupi district, and the Legislative Assembly constituencies of Moodabidri, Surathkal and Bantwal were in Dakshina Kannada district. After delimitation in 2008, Baindur became part of Shimoga constituency and Brahmavar ceased to exist.

== Members of Parliament ==
- Madras State: (as South Kanara (North))
  - 1952: Ullal Srinivas Mallya, Indian National Congress
  - With the implementation of States Reorganisation Act, 1956, it ceased to exist.
  - For information after 1956, see : Udupi Lok Sabha

== See also ==
- Dakshina Kannada district
- Kasaragod Lok Sabha constituency
- List of former constituencies of the Lok Sabha
- South Kanara (South) Lok Sabha constituency
- Udupi Lok Sabha constituency
- Udupi Chikmagalur Lok Sabha constituency
- Udupi district
