= Halady Srinivas Shetty =

Indian politician

Halady Srinivas Shetty (born 6 April 1951) is a five-term MLA from Kundapur. He quit the Bharatiya Janata Party in 2012 after he was invited by BJP to take oath as a minister and later insulting him by denial of a ministerial position, fought and won the 2013 election as an independent candidate without the support of any political party, and rejoined the party before the 2018 assembly election. He is called ''ಕುಂದಾಪುರದ ವಾಜಪೇಯಿ (Vajapayee of Kundapura)'' due to his simplicity.
