= J. M. Lobo Prabhu =

Indian politician

J. M. Lobo Prabhu was an Indian politician of Swatantra Party. He represented the Udupi (Lok Sabha constituency) in the fourth Lok Sabha.
