= Shobha Karandlaje =

Indian politician (born 1966)

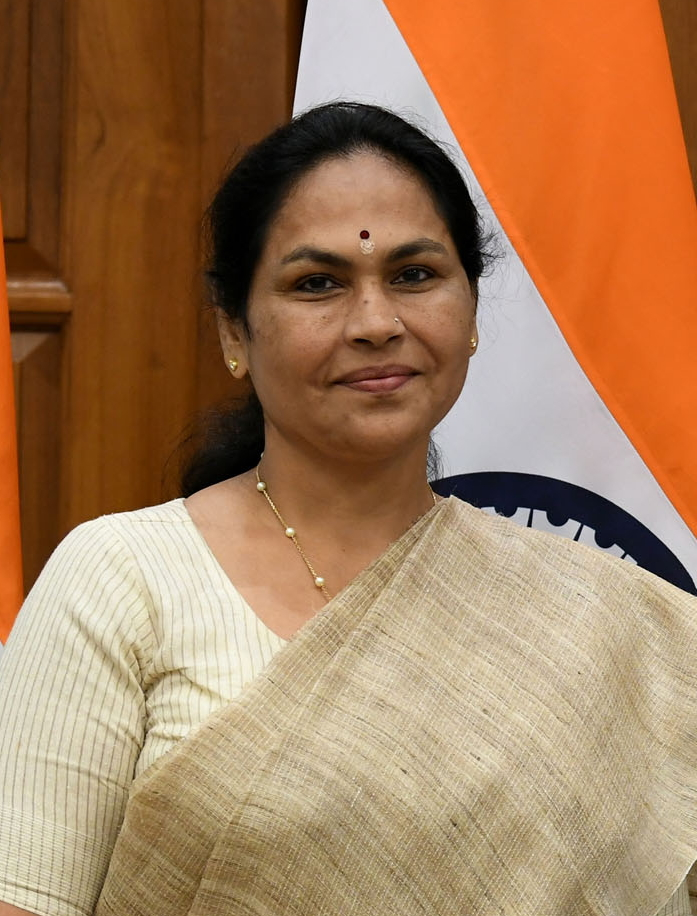
- Shobha Karandlaje in 2021

Minister of State in Ministry of Labour and Employment
- Incumbent
- Assumed office 11 June 2024
- Prime Minister: Narendra Modi
- Minister: Mansukh Mandaviya
- Preceded by: Rameswar Teli

Minister of State in Ministry of Micro, Small and Medium Enterprises
- Incumbent
- Assumed office 11 June 2024
- Prime Minister: Narendra Modi
- Minister: Jitan Ram Manjhi
- Preceded by: Bhanu Pratap Singh Verma

Minister of State for Food Processing Industries
- In office 7 December 2023 – 11 June 2024
- Prime Minister: Narendra Modi
- Minister: Pashupati Kumar Paras
- Preceded by: Prahlad Singh Patel
- Succeeded by: Ravneet Singh Bittu

Minister of State for Agriculture and Farmers Welfare
- In office 7 July 2021 – 11 June 2024 Serving with Kailash Choudhary
- President: Ram Nath Kovind
- Prime Minister: Narendra Modi
- Minister: Narendra Singh Tomar
- Preceded by: Parshottam Rupala
- Succeeded by: Ram Nath Thakur

Minister of Energy Government of Karnataka
- In office 22 September 2010 – 23 January 2013
- Chief Minister: B. S. Yediyurappa; Sadananda Gowda; Jagadish Shettar
- Preceded by: K. S. Eshwarappa
- Succeeded by: D. K. Shivakumar

Minister of Food & Civil Supplies Government of Karnataka
- In office 12 December 2010 – 12 July 2012
- Chief Minister: B. S. Yediyurappa; Sadananda Gowda
- Preceded by: V. Somanna
- Succeeded by: D. N. Jeevaraj

Minister of Rural Development Government of Karnataka
- In office 30 May 2008 – 9 November 2009
- Chief Minister: B. S. Yediyurappa
- Preceded by: C. M. Udasi
- Succeeded by: Jagadish Shettar

Member of Parliament Lok Sabha
- In office 2014–2024
- Preceded by: K. Jayaprakash Hegde
- Succeeded by: Kota Srinivas Poojary
- Constituency: Udupi Chikmagalur
- Incumbent
- Assumed office 4 June 2024
- Preceded by: Sadananda Gowda
- Constituency: Bangalore North

Member of Karnataka Legislative Assembly
- In office 2008–2013
- Preceded by: seat did not exist
- Succeeded by: S. T. Somashekhar
- Constituency: Yeshvanthapura

Member of Karnataka Legislative Council
- In office 15 June 2004 – 27 May 2008
- Succeeded by: S. Kailash
- Constituency: elected by Legislative Assembly members

Personal details
- Born: 23 October 1966 (age 59) Puttur, Mysore State, India
- Party: Bharatiya Janata Party (till 2012; 2014–present)
- Other political affiliations: Karnataka Janata Paksha (2012-2014)
- Education: M.A. (Sociology), M.S.W. - Mangalore University
- Nickname: Shobhakka

Shobha Karandlaje (born 23 October 1966) is an Indian politician from Karnataka who is currently the Minister of State for Ministry of Labour and Employment, Ministry of Micro, Small and Medium Enterprises in the Third Modi Ministry. She was also Minister of State for Agriculture and Farmers' Welfare Minister of State for Food Processing Industries in the Second Modi ministry. She is also the Vice President of Bharatiya Janata Party, Karnataka and Member of Parliament representing Bangalore North since 2024, and represented Udupi Chikmagalur Lok Sabha Constituency from 2014 to 2024. She was a cabinet minister in the Government of Karnataka.

== Early life ==
Hailing from Puttur in Coastal Karnataka, Shobha became associated with the Rashtriya Swayamsevak Sangh at a very early age, one of the many women full-time workers of the Rashtriya Swayamsevak Sangh. When she decided to enter politics, the RSS gave her the initial thrust.

Shobha completed her M.A. in Sociology and Master of Social Work from Open University, Mysore and School of Social Work Roshni Nilaya, Mangalore University.

== Political career ==
She served the Bharatiya Janata Party organisation in various capacities before being elected as an MLC in 2004. She was elected as MLA from Yeswanthpur, Bangalore in May 2008 and was appointed the minister for Rural Development and Panchayat Raj in the B S Yeddyurappa govt.

She was lauded for her performance as the RDPR minister and came to be known as a good administrator. She resigned in 2009 due to a political crisis but was re-instated in 2010 and was entrusted with the Energy portfolio. She was the power minister in the Jagadish Shettar ministry and also had the additional charge of the Food and Civil Supplies department. She had resigned from BJP and joined KJP formed by ex Chief Minister of Karnataka B. S. Yediyurappa in the year 2012 and was appointed KJP Working President. She contested 2013 assembly election from Rajaji Nagar (Vidhan Sabha constituency) and came third. By January 2014 she was back in BJP when her party KJP merged with BJP.

She then contested the 2014 Indian general election from Udupi Chikmagalur constituency and won by a margin of 1.81 lakh votes. In 2019 General elections she won consistently for second time gaining 7,18,916 votes, adding +6.26 percentage of votes from Udupi Chikmagalur (Lok Sabha constituency). In the 2024 Indian General Elections, she contested from Bangalore North Lok Sabha constituency, and won by a margin of 2,59,476 votes against the Indian National Congress's candidate, Rajeev Gowda.

== Other work ==
Shobha made her acting debut on the Kannada TV show CID Karnataka where she played the role of Chief Minister who helps strengthening the CID agency to control anti-social elements.

== Filmography ==
=== TV Series ===
Year	Title	Role	Notes	Ref.
2013	CID Karnataka	Chief Minister Shobha	Episode 1	

== See also ==
- Third Modi ministry
