= S. S. Kolkebail =

Indian politician and lawyer

S. S. Kolkebail ( Sanjeeva Shetty Kolkebail) was a lawyer from Kundapur hailed from a prominent bunt family Kolkebail. He became the Member of Legislative Assembly of Madras Government in 1952. He was the member of "Composition of the House Committee" from 1952 to 1957. He represented Bhramavar and Kundapur Constituencies and was MLA for 3 terms.
