= Udupi =

- City
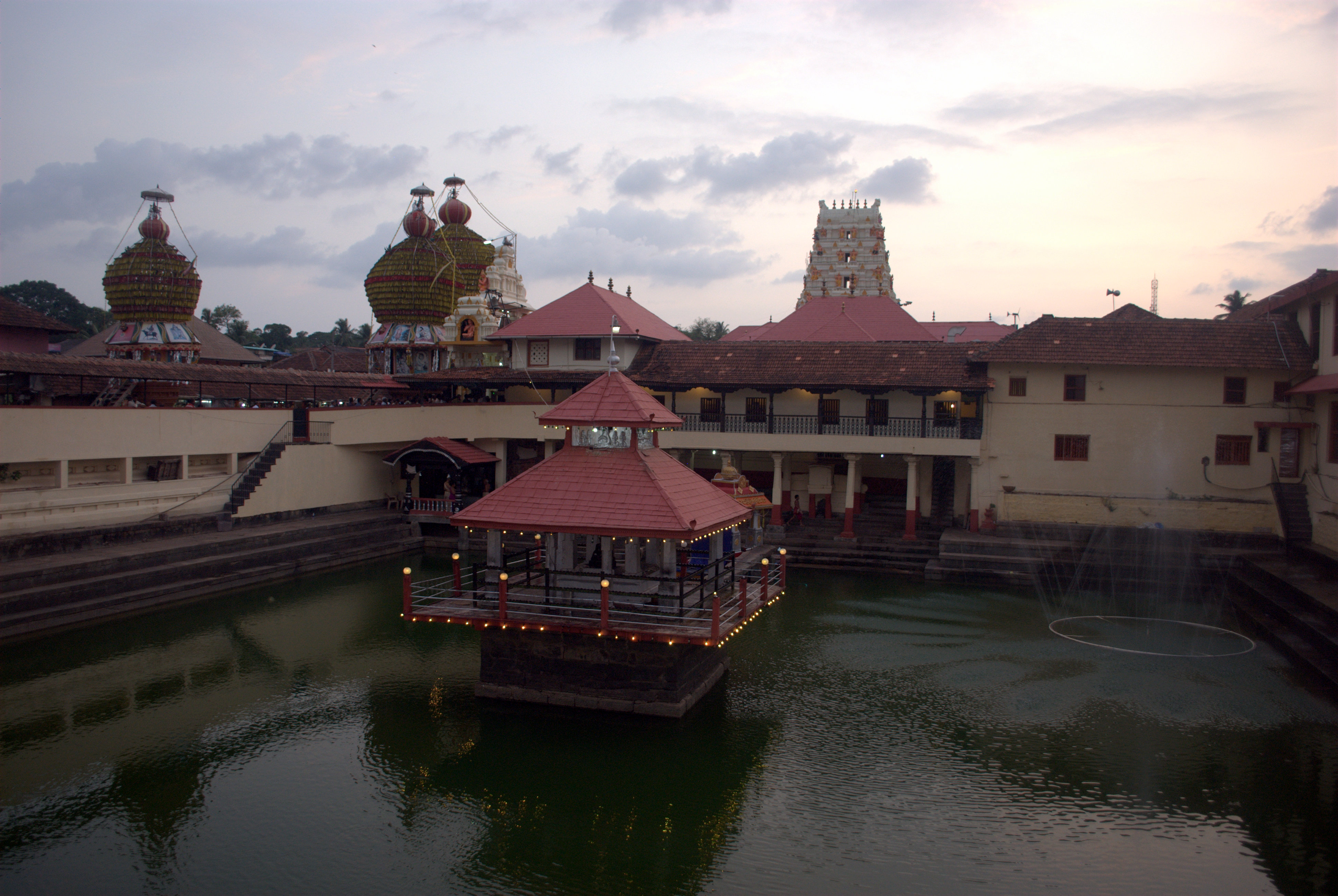
- Madhva sarovara of Udupi Sri Krishna Temple
- Udupi in Karnataka
- Coordinates: 13.3389°N 74.7451°E
- Country: India
- State: Karnataka
- District: Udupi
- MP: Kota Srinivas Poojary
- MLA: Yashpal Anand Suvarna

Area
  - City: 68.33 km^{2} (26.38 sq mi)
- Elevation: 27 m (89 ft)

Population (2011)
  - City: 215,500
  - Density: 3,154/km^{2} (8,168/sq mi)
  - Metro: 436,208
- Time zone: UTC+5:30 (IST)
- PIN: 576101 – 576108
- Telephone code: 0820
- Vehicle registration: KA-20
- Official language: Kannada,Tulu
- Website: www.udupicity.mrc.gov.in

Udupi (Kannada: [uɖupi]), also known as Odipu ([oɖipu]) in Tulu, is a city in the Indian state of Karnataka. It is the administrative headquarters and taluka of Udupi district, and one of the fastest-growing cities in Karnataka. Udupi is one of the top tourist attractions in Karnataka and has various educational institutions. It is notable for the Krishna Temple and is also known as the temple city. It also lends its name to the popular Udupi cuisine, is also known as Parashurama Kshetra, and is famous for Kanakana kindi. Udupi district is located in western part of Karnataka.

== Etymology ==
There are two accepted etymologies for Udupi:

The word 'Udupi' may derive from the Sanskrit word 'Udupa' ([uɖuːpa]), meaning "Moon".

The word 'Udupi' may also derive from the Tulu word 'Odipu', meaning 'elevated land'.

== History ==
In the 13th century, Vaishnavite saint Madhvacharya founded the Sri Krishna Temple. He set up eight mathas – Ashta Mathas in Udupi to propagate the Dvaita Vedanta philosophy, and this caused a vibrant temple culture to take root in present-day Udupi district. Significant migration of Brahmins to the region took place subsequently, and they came to comprise 10 per cent of the region's population, three times higher than elsewhere in South India.

== Demographics ==
Religions in Udupi (2011)
Religion	Percent
Hinduism	84.74%
Islam	8.04%
Christianity	6.91%
Other or not stated	0.31%

Udupi city is part of the eponymous district in Karnataka, India. As per the census in 2011, Udupi city has 33,987 households and a total population of 144,960, of which 71,614 are males and 73,346 are females. The population of scheduled castes is 8,385 while that of scheduled tribes is 6,774. The city population is growing at a rate of 14.03%.

Languages of Udupi (2011)
1. Tulu (52.1%)
2. Kannada (16.9%)
3. Konkani (15.0%)
4. Urdu (6.04%)
5. Marathi (3.42%)
6. Malayalam (2.01%)
7. Tamil (1.07%)
8. Others (3.40%)

The most spoken language in Udupi town is Tulu. Kannada and Konkani are also spoken in Udupi town. Dakhini Urdu and Beary are spoken by Muslims in the region.

== Government and politics ==
Udupi city falls under the Udupi Chikmagalur Lok Sabha constituency and the Udupi Chikmagalur State assembly constituency and is represented by the Member of Parliament Kota Srinivas Poojary and Member of Legislative Assembly, Yashpal Suvarna.

=== Civic Administration ===
Udupi, which previously had a Town Municipal Council now has a City Municipal Council which came into existence in 1995. Areas around Udupi, such as Manipal, Parkala, Malpe, Udyavara and Santhekatte were merged to form the City Municipal Council.

The city of Udupi is governed by the City Municipal Council and has 35 wards spread across an area of 75.92 km^{2} (29.31 sq mi). It is headed by Anand C Kallolikar, the Municipal Commissioner. The city council has departments for health, urban planning, technical division, revenue, finance, birth and death, and Day-NULM.

=== Civic Utility ===
The master plan of the city is prepared by the Udupi Urban Development Authority (UUDA) and the Directorate of Town and Country Planning.

The city receives its primary source of drinking water from water stored at Baje Vented Dam. The municipality also seeks to augment its water storage by pumping water accumulated in the Swarna River at Sanebettu. The city is divided into three zones with different timings for efficient water supply. It also received a loan of $75 million from the Asian Development Bank to have round-the-clock water supply in 2018. The city has both open and closed drains. The underground sewage network exists in only 20% of the city's area as of 2017, but has been proposed to increase from the present 82 kilometres to 143 kilometres. The municipality area generated 46 million litres (MLD) of sewage which is treated at a sewage treatment plant in Nittur.There is a fire station at Udupi at Nayarkere.

== Geography and climate ==
Udupi has an elevation of 27 m (89 ft) above mean sea level. The climate in Udupi is hot in summer and pleasant in winter. During summers (from March to May) the temperature reaches up to 38 °C (100 °F) and in winters (from December to February) it is usually between 32 and 20 °C (90 and 68 °F). As it is a coastal area, there are a few beaches which are tourist attractions. Kaup beach, Malpe beach are two of the beaches in Udupi.

The monsoon period is from June to September, with rainfall averaging more than 4,000 mm (160 in) every year and heavy winds.

Climate data for Udupi
Month	Jan	Feb	Mar	Apr	May	Jun	Jul	Aug	Sep	Oct	Nov	Dec	Year
Mean daily maximum °C (°F)	32.8 (91.0)	33.5 (92.3)	33.6 (92.5)	34.2 (93.6)	33.3 (91.9)	29.7 (85.5)	28.0 (82.4)	28.4 (83.1)	29.5 (85.1)	30.9 (87.6)	32.3 (90.1)	32.8 (91.0)	31.6 (88.8)
Mean daily minimum °C (°F)	20.8 (69.4)	21.8 (71.2)	23.6 (74.5)	25 (77)	25.1 (77.2)	23.4 (74.1)	22.9 (73.2)	23 (73)	23.1 (73.6)	23.1 (73.6)	22.4 (72.3)	21.2 (70.2)	23.0 (73.3)
Average precipitation mm (inches)	1.1 (0.04)	0.2 (0.01)	2.9 (0.11)	24.4 (0.96)	183.2 (7.21)	1,177.2 (46.35)	1,350.4 (53.17)	787.3 (31.00)	292.1 (11.50)	190.8 (7.51)	70.9 (2.79)	16.4 (0.65)	4,096.9 (161.30)

== Culture ==
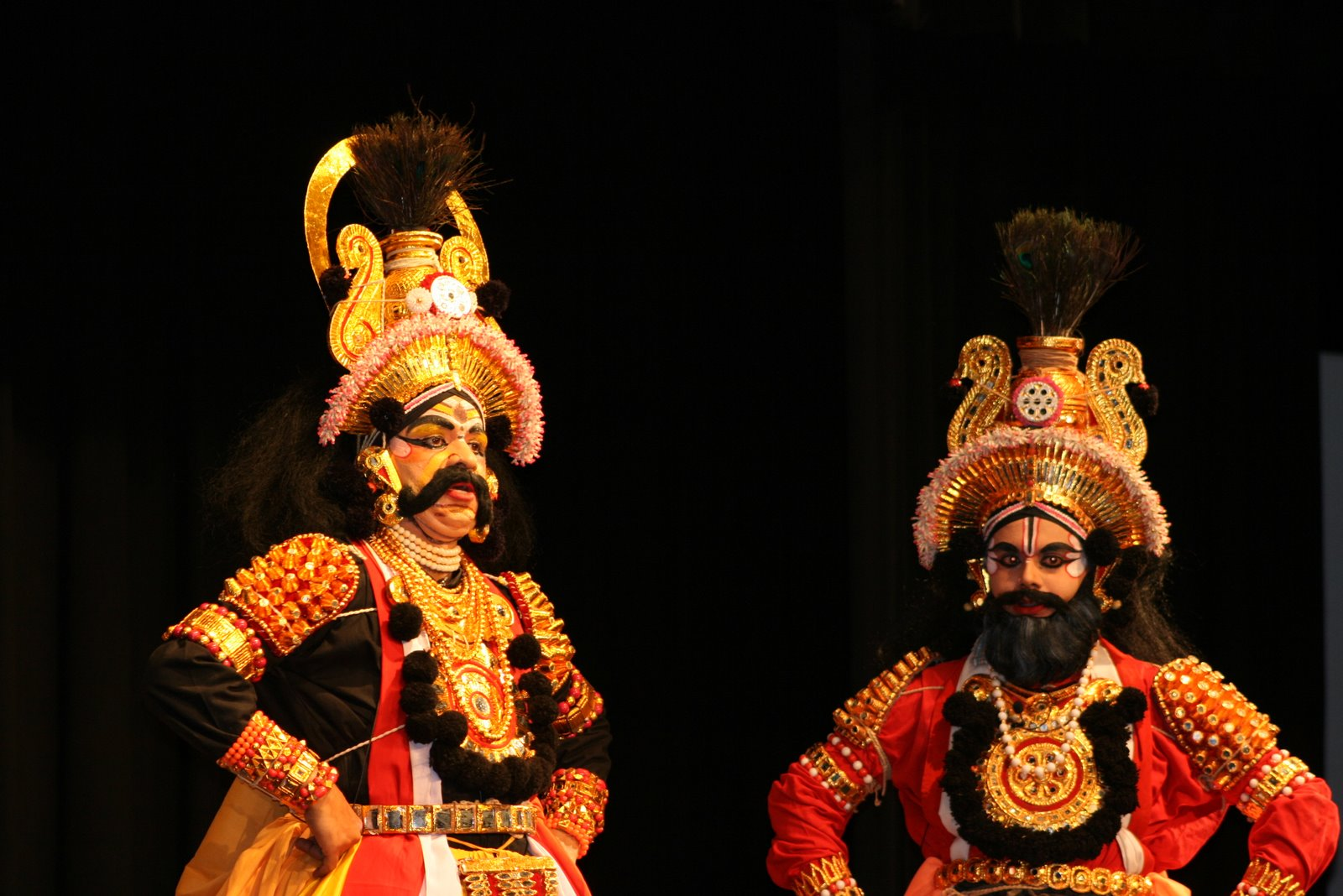
Yakshagana in Udupi

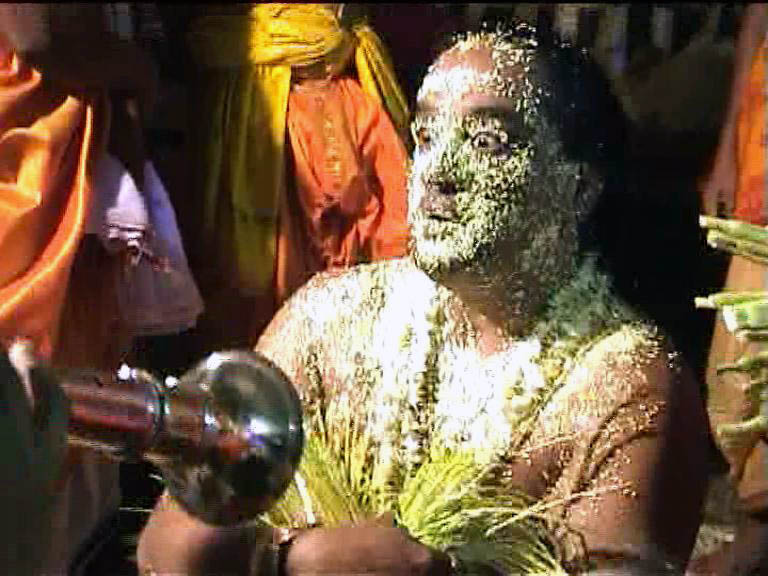
Nagapatri at Belle Brahmastana

Bhuta Kola, Aati kalenja, Karangolu, and Nagaradhane are some cultural traditions of Udupi. The residents celebrate festivals such as Makara Sankranti, Nagara Panchami, Krishna Janmashtami, Ganesh Chaturthi, Navaratri, Deepavali. Folk arts like Yakshagana are also popular.

During Krishna Janmashtami, Pili Yesa, a traditional folk dance originated in Udupi is demonstrated on the streets. "Pili Yesa" translates to Tiger.

== Cuisine ==
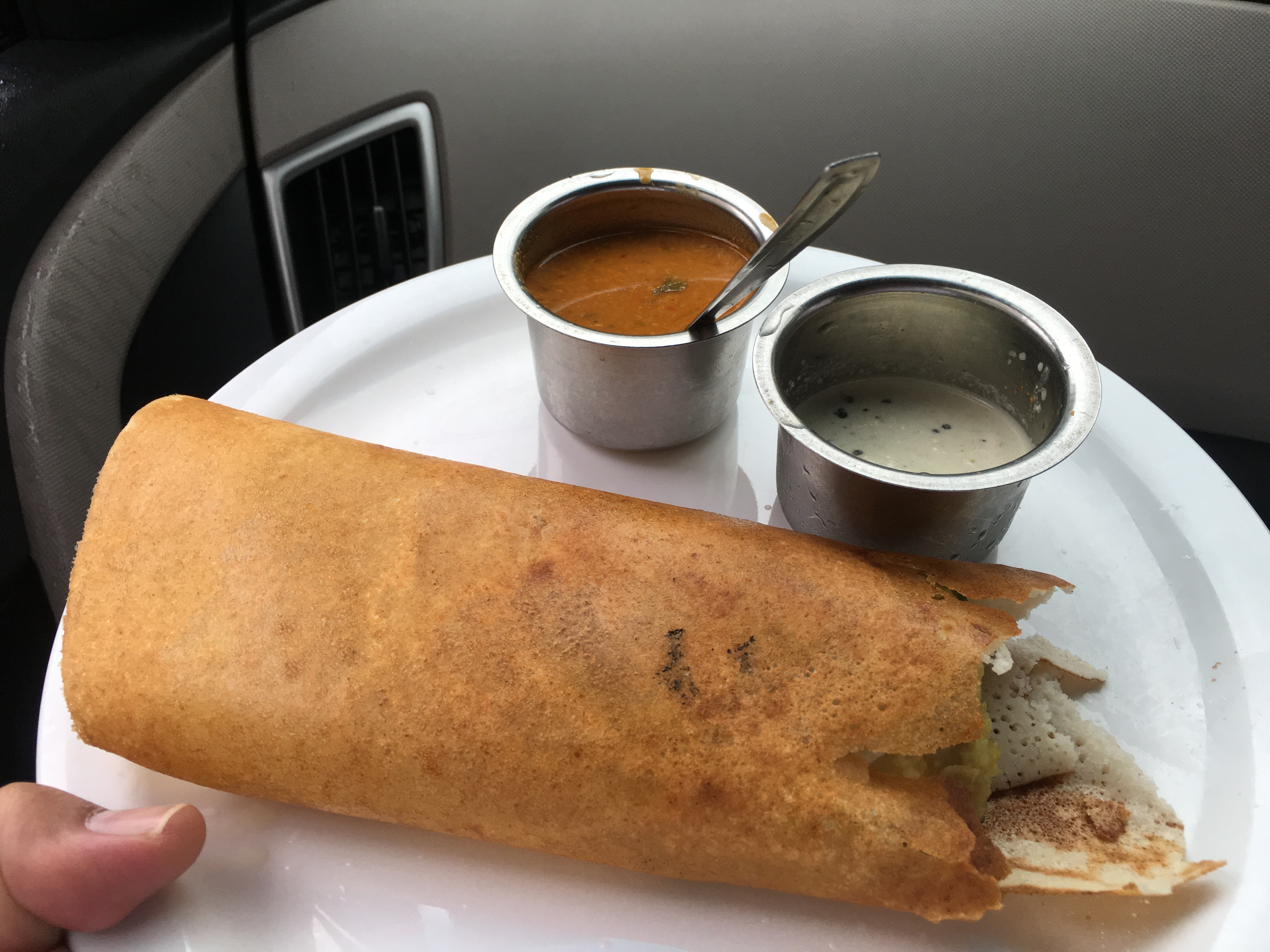
Masala dosa is a part of Udupi cuisine.

The origin of this cuisine is linked to Krishna Matha (Mutt). Lord Krishna is offered food of different varieties every day, and there are certain restrictions on ingredients during Chaturmasa (a four-month period during the monsoon season). These restrictions coupled with the requirement of variety led to innovation, especially in dishes incorporating seasonal and locally available materials. This cuisine was developed by Shivalli Madhwa Brahmins who cooked food for Lord Krishna, and at Krishna Matha in Udupi, the food is provided free of cost. Restaurants specialised in Udupi cuisine can be seen widely in most metropolitan and large cities around the length and breadth of India.

Although popular for its vegetarian cuisine, Udupi has its fair share of non-vegetarian dishes that are similar to Mangalorean cuisine. Some of these include Kori Roti, Kori Pulimunchi, Chicken Sukka, Fish Curry, Fish Fry and more.

== Economy ==
Udupi is becoming a major town in Karnataka. Udupi is the birthplace of the Syndicate Bank, Corporation Bank. Udupi's economy also consists of agriculture and fishing. Small-scale industries like the cashew industry, and other food industries and milk cooperatives are the most prominent. Recently, Udupi is also making its mark in the real estate industry, greatly influenced by its neighboring spearhead Mangalore.

The Karnataka government had signed a memorandum of understanding (MoU) with the Cogentrix Light and Power Industry to set up a thermal power plant in the district at Nandikur. However, because of stiff opposition from citizens and environmentalist groups, the project has been temporarily suspended. An attempt by the Nagarjuna Power Corporation to set up a similar plant at nearby Padubidri also met strong opposition. Now, the power plant has been set up, generating 1,200 MW of power under the name of Udupi Power Corporation Limited (UPCL), a subsidiary of Lanco Infra, an Andhra Pradesh-based infrastructure major. Adani Power has taken over from Lanco Infra in 2014 for a sum of ₹6,000 crore (US$620 million). The opposition, however, continues.

Manipal, a suburb of Udupi, is home to the headquarters of Syndicate Bank. It is renowned as an education and medical hub. Kasturba Medical College and MIT (Manipal Institute of Technology) are situated here.

TEBMA Shipyards Ltd is located in Malpe harbour complex. It is involved in building multipurpose platform supply vessels (MPSVs), platform supply vessel, geotechnical research vessel, dredgers and tugs for Indian as well as export markets.

Udupi has a local handloom sari industry. Made of pure cotton and lightweight, the sari has art silk design on its border and pallu besides butta of art silk dotting it. Hard work, low returns, and competition from power loom has led to a drop in the number of weavers of nearly 95% over three decades. A geographical indication tag for Udupi sarees is under examination with the Geographical Indications Registry of India.

== Transport ==
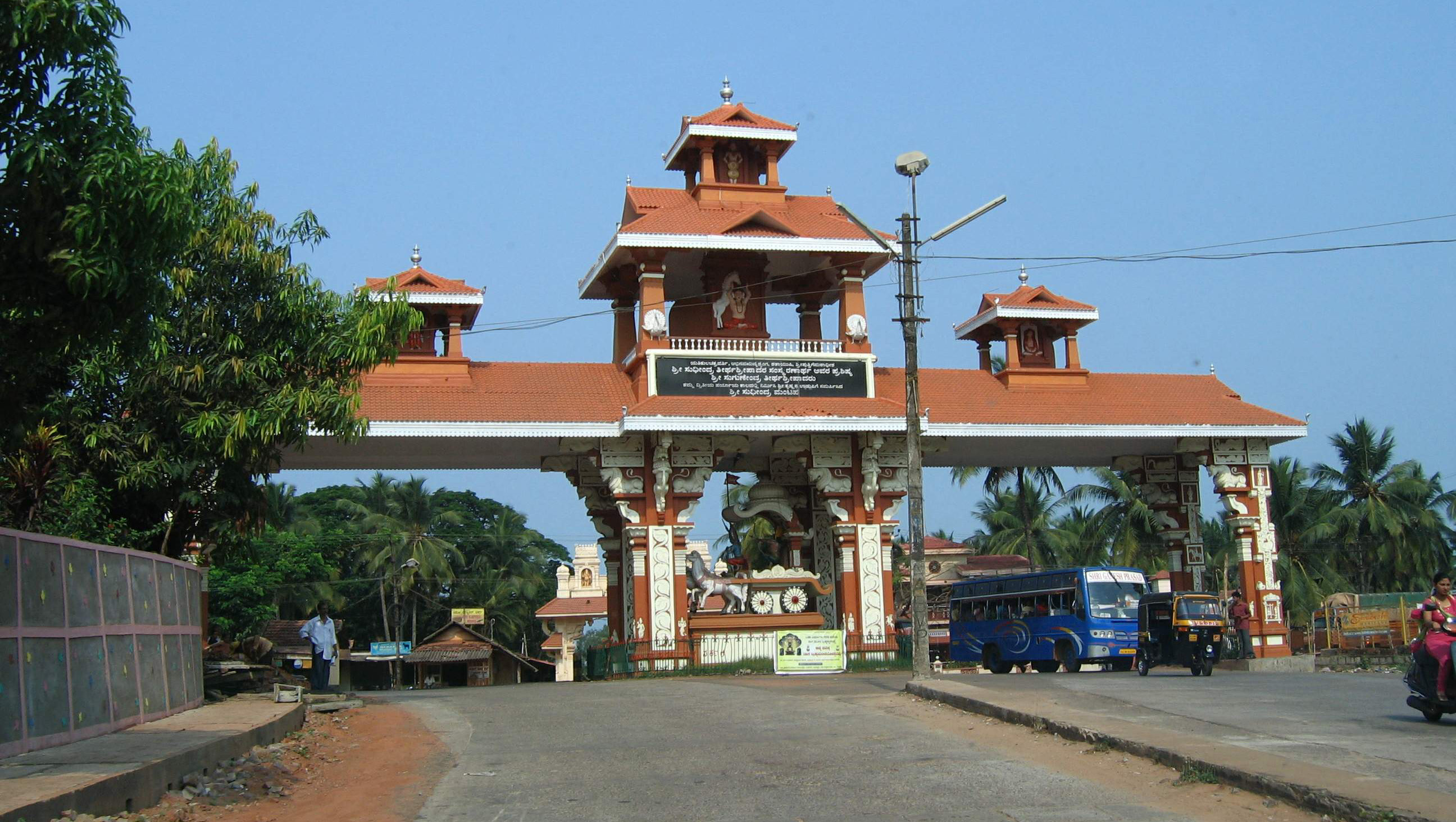
The Swagatha Gopura

National Highways NH 66 and NH 169A pass through Udupi. Other significant roads include the State Highways to Karkala, Dharmastala and Sringeri. NH 66 provides a link to Mangalore and Karwar via Kundapur and NH 169A to Hebri, Agumbe, Thirthahalli and Shivamogga. Private as well as government buses connect Udupi to all parts of Karnataka. Udupi has a railway station on the Konkan Railway. The nearest International Airport to Udupi is Mangalore International Airport, which is approx. 58.5 km (36.4 mi) away.

City and suburban transport is available for travel within Udupi and its suburbs. The buses originate from the suburban bus stand (City Bus Stand). There are private bus operators as well as KSRTC city service buses.

The nearest harbor/ port to Udupi is Malpe, which is 5 km (3.1 mi) away, and Gangolli (Byndoor), which is 36 km (22 mi) away. The New Mangalore Port is 50 km (31 mi) away from Udupi.

Udupi railway station is managed by Konkan Railways. It is in Indrali about 4 km (2.5 mi) from Udupi city bus stand and is on the Kanyakumari-Mumbai rail route. Direct trains are available to Bengaluru, Mumbai, New Delhi, Amritsar, Chandigarh, Pune, Ajmer, Jaipur, Rajkot, Ahmedabad and Okha. Cities like Mysore, Belgaum, Jodhpur, Agra, Thiruvananthapuram, Ernakulam, Kollam (Quilon), etc., are also connected to Udupi.

== See also ==
- Greater Udupi
- Udupi cuisine
- Udupi Krishna Temple
- Roman Catholic Diocese of Udupi
- Mangalore
- Manipal
- Udupi district

== Bibliography ==
- Shivaram, Choodie (11 August 1996). "Karnataka Spiritual Centers Threatened by Development: Three 700-Year-Old Monasteries in Udupi and Scores of Temples to be Displaced by Reckless Industrial Projects". Hinduism Today.
- "Conquer Vices To Sublimate The Mind". The Hindu. 29 January 1996. Archived from the original on 23 September 2015.
- "Ashtha Muth and Paryaya". Udupi temples.
- Dr.Neria H. Hebbar. "The Eight Tulu Monasteries of Udupi". Archived from the original on 6 January 2006.
- Kundali dasa. "How Krishna Came to Udupi". www.krishna.com.
- Karnataka State Gazetteer 1983'. Government of Karnataka. 1983
- "Udupi Railway Station Information".
- "A brief life sketch of Madhwacharya". Archived from the original on 16 January 2025.
- "Janmashtami celebrations end with Vittal Pindi procession". NewsKarnataka. 6 September 2015.
- Sri Udupi Kshetrada Naija Chitra Mattu Chaaritrika Hinnele [The Authentic Picture of Udupi Piligrim Center and its Historical Background]
