= Manorama Madhwaraj =

Indian politician

Cabinet Minister, Government of Karnataka
- In office 1974–1983

Member of the Karnataka Legislative Assembly
- In office 1972–1994

Cabinet Minister, Government of Karnataka
- In office 1989–1994

Member of the Lok Sabha
- In office 2004–2008
- Preceded by: Vinay Kumar Sorake
- Succeeded by: Constituency abolished
- Constituency: Udupi

Personal details
- Born: Manorama Malpe Madhwaraj; 1 June 1940 (age 86) Manampadi, Karnataka, British India
- Citizenship: India
- Party: Bharatiya Janata Party
- Other party: Indian National Congress
- Spouse: Malpe Madhwaraj
- Children: Pramod Madhwaraj
- Education: Bachelor of Arts
- Alma mater: Karnataka University
- Occupation: Business person
- Profession: Politician
- As of 23 September, 2006

Manorama Madhwaraj is an Indian politician, social worker and officeholder who was the first woman cabinet minister of India elected as an MLA in the 5th, 8th and 9th Karnataka Legislative Assembly. On all of these occasions she was elected from Udupi constituency and was a member of the Indian National Congress.

She was also member of the 14th Lok Sabha of India. She represented the Udupi constituency of Karnataka and was a member of the Bharatiya Janata Party (BJP) political party. She quit BJP and Lok Sabha after voting in favour of Congress during vote of confidence.

Her son, Pramod Madhwaraj was a minister in Siddaramaiah's Congress Government between 2013-18.

== Positions held ==
- 1972 - 1994, Member of Karnataka Legislative Assembly
- 1974 - 83, Cabinet Minister, Government of Karnataka
- 1989 - 94, Cabinet Minister, Government of Karnataka
- 2001 - 2003, Chairperson (Cabinet Rank) of State Tourism Development Corporation
- 2004, Elected as Member of 14th Lok Sabha
- 2004, Member of Committee on Water Resources
- 16 August 2006 to present, Member of Committee on Empowerment of Women
- 5 August 2007 to present, Member of Committee on Water Resources
