= Udupi Assembly constituency =

Legislative Assembly constituency in Karnataka, India

Coordinates: 13.34°N 74.75°E

Udupi
- Constituency No. 120 for the Karnataka Legislative Assembly

Constituency details
- Country: India
- Region: South India
- State: Karnataka
- District: Udupi
- Lok Sabha constituency: Udupi Chikmagalur
- Established: 1951
- Total electors: 216,989
- Reservation: None

Member of Legislative Assembly
- 16th Karnataka Legislative Assembly
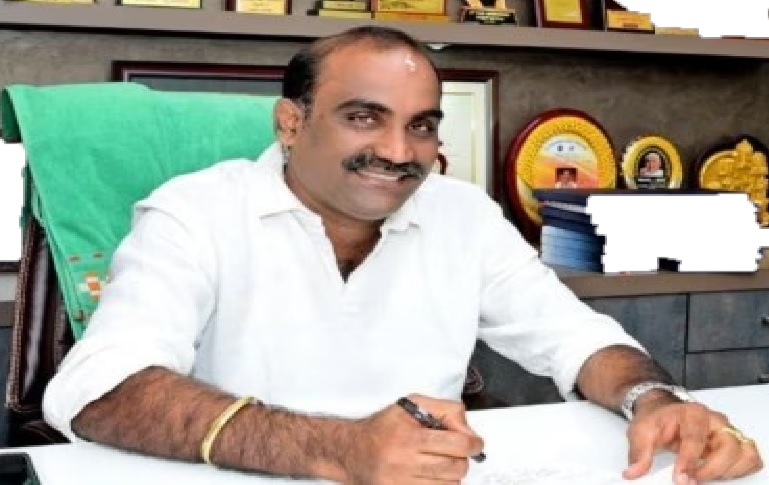
- Incumbent Yashpal Anand Suvarna
- Party: Bharatiya Janata Party
- Elected year: 2023
- Preceded by: K. Raghupati Bhat

Udupi Assembly constituency is one of the 224 seats in the Indian state of Karnataka's Assembly (State Assembly). It is part of Udupi Chikmagalur seat of the Lok Sabha (lower house of the national parliament).

== Members of the Legislative Assembly ==
Election	Member	Party
1952	T. A. Pai	Indian National Congress
1957	Upendra Nayak	Praja Socialist Party
1962	M. Madhvaraja	Indian National Congress
1967	S. K. Amin	Indian National Congress
1972	Manorama Madhwaraj	Indian National Congress
1978	Manorama Madhwaraj	Indian National Congress
1983	V. S. Acharya	Bharatiya Janata Party
1985	Manorama Madhwaraj	Indian National Congress
1989	Manorama Madhwaraj	Indian National Congress
1994	U. R. Sabhapathi	Karnataka Pradesh Congress Committee
1999	U. R. Sabhapathi	Indian National Congress
2004	K. Raghupati Bhat	Bharatiya Janata Party
2008	K. Raghupati Bhat	Bharatiya Janata Party
2013	Pramod Madhwaraj	Indian National Congress
2018	K. Raghupati Bhat	Bharatiya Janata Party
2023	Yashpal Anand Suvarna	Bharatiya Janata Party

== Election results ==
=== Assembly Election 2023 ===
2023 Karnataka Legislative Assembly election : Udupi
Party	Candidate	Votes	%	±%
BJP	Yashpal Anand Suvarna	97,079	58.46	▲6.15
INC	Prasadraj Kanchan	64,303	38.72	▼6.17
NOTA	None of the above	1,316	0.79	▲0.12
UPP	Nithin. V. Poojary	1,119	0.67	New
Margin of victory		32,776	19.74	▲12.32
Turnout		166,659	76.81	▼1.56
Total valid votes		166,060		
Registered electors		216,989		▲4.59
BJP hold		Swing	▲6.15	

=== Assembly Election 2018 ===
2018 Karnataka Legislative Assembly election : Udupi
Party	Candidate	Votes	%	±%
BJP	K. Raghupati Bhat	84,946	52.31	▲10.73
INC	Pramod Madhwaraj	72,902	44.89	▼31.40
JD(S)	Birthi Gangandhar Bhandary	1,361	0.84	▼0.05
NOTA	None of the above	1,089	0.67	New
Margin of victory		12,044	7.42	▼27.29
Turnout		162,592	78.37	▲1.81
Total valid votes		162,405		
Registered electors		207,458		▲14.69
BJP gain from INC		Swing	▼23.98	

=== Assembly Election 2013 ===
2013 Karnataka Legislative Assembly election : Udupi
Party	Candidate	Votes	%	±%
INC	Pramod Madhwaraj	86,868	76.29	▲28.38
BJP	B. Sudhakar Shetty	47,344	41.58	▼8.44
Independent	Alevoor Yogeesh Acharya	1,472	1.29	New
JD(S)	Barkur Satish Poojary	1,017	0.89	New
BSP	Manjunath. V	986	0.87	▼1.20
Margin of victory		39,524	34.71	▲32.61
Turnout		138,491	76.56	▲2.35
Total valid votes		113,861		
Registered electors		180,892		▲13.93
INC gain from BJP		Swing	▲26.27	

=== Assembly Election 2008 ===
2008 Karnataka Legislative Assembly election : Udupi
Party	Candidate	Votes	%	±%
BJP	K. Raghupati Bhat	58,920	50.02	▲11.10
INC	Pramod Madhwaraj	56,441	47.91	▲10.64
BSP	Zakir Hussain	2,443	2.07	New
Margin of victory		2,479	2.10	▲0.46
Turnout		117,818	74.21	▲7.41
Total valid votes		117,804		
Registered electors		158,773		▲13.54
BJP hold		Swing	▲11.10	

=== Assembly Election 2004 ===
2004 Karnataka Legislative Assembly election : Udupi
Party	Candidate	Votes	%	±%
BJP	K. Raghupati Bhat	36,341	38.92	▼9.24
INC	U. R. Sabhapathi	34,808	37.27	▼11.74
Independent	B. Sudhakar Shetty	18,633	19.95	New
Kannada Nadu Party	Ganesh Acharya. A	2,447	2.62	New
Independent	Balaraj. M. K	694	0.74	New
Margin of victory		1,533	1.64	▲0.79
Turnout		93,416	66.80	▲2.59
Total valid votes		93,384		
Registered electors		139,842		▲5.01
BJP gain from INC		Swing	▼10.09	

=== Assembly Election 1999 ===
1999 Karnataka Legislative Assembly election : Udupi
Party	Candidate	Votes	%	±%
INC	U. R. Sabhapathi	41,018	49.01	▲17.37
BJP	B. Sudhakar Shetty	40,308	48.16	▲20.01
BSP	Sundra	1,040	1.24	New
JD(S)	Philomena D. Silva	587	0.70	New
Margin of victory		710	0.85	▼5.29
Turnout		85,507	64.21	▼1.87
Total valid votes		83,701		
Rejected ballots		1,760	2.06	▲1.39
Registered electors		133,168		▲11.39
INC gain from INC		Swing	▲11.23	

=== Assembly Election 1994 ===
1994 Karnataka Legislative Assembly election : Udupi
Party	Candidate	Votes	%	±%
INC	U. R. Sabhapathi	29,649	37.78	New
INC	Manorama Madhwaraj	24,831	31.64	▼7.41
BJP	Dr. V. S. Acharya	22,087	28.15	▲11.17
JD	Dhanraj	1,430	1.82	▼3.29
Margin of victory		4,818	6.14	▲5.10
Turnout		79,002	66.08	▼2.94
Total valid votes		78,469		
Rejected ballots		532	0.67	▼3.72
Registered electors		119,550		▲4.46
INC gain from INC		Swing	▼1.27	

=== Assembly Election 1989 ===
1989 Karnataka Legislative Assembly election : Udupi
Party	Candidate	Votes	%	±%
INC	Manorama Madhwaraj	29,490	39.05	▼23.88
Independent	U. R. Sabhapathi	28,705	38.01	New
BJP	M. Somashekhara Bhat	12,824	16.98	▼19.66
JD	Gangadhar Salian	3,859	5.11	New
JP	Tharanatha Shetty	457	0.61	New
Margin of victory		785	1.04	▼25.25
Turnout		78,991	69.02	▲0.23
Total valid votes		75,524		
Rejected ballots		3,467	4.39	▲3.78
Registered electors		114,448		▲29.03
INC hold		Swing	▼23.88	

=== Assembly Election 1985 ===
1985 Karnataka Legislative Assembly election : Udupi
Party	Candidate	Votes	%	±%
INC	Manorama Madhwaraj	38,162	62.93	▲19.68
BJP	V. S. Acharya	22,221	36.64	▼12.66
Margin of victory		15,941	26.29	▲20.24
Turnout		61,013	68.79	▼1.26
Total valid votes		60,642		
Rejected ballots		371	0.61	▼0.41
Registered electors		88,698		▲14.93
INC gain from BJP		Swing	▲13.63	

=== Assembly Election 1983 ===
1983 Karnataka Legislative Assembly election : Udupi
Party	Candidate	Votes	%	±%
BJP	V. S. Acharya	26,385	49.30	New
INC	M. Manorama Madhavaraj	23,146	43.25	▲41.23
JP	B. P. Bhaskar	3,137	5.86	▼35.19
Independent	Balagatta Ramachandra Bhat	847	1.58	New
Margin of victory		3,239	6.05	▼8.48
Turnout		54,066	70.05	▼7.74
Total valid votes		53,515		
Rejected ballots		551	1.02	▼0.37
Registered electors		77,177		▲6.49
BJP gain from INC(I)		Swing	▼6.28	

=== Assembly Election 1978 ===
1978 Karnataka Legislative Assembly election : Udupi
Party	Candidate	Votes	%	±%
INC(I)	Manorama Madhwaraj	30,899	55.58	New
JP	Shridhara. M. Kalmady	22,819	41.05	New
INC	B. Soorappa Hegde	1,123	2.02	▼56.47
Independent	Yashoda. S. Arunmugham	650	1.17	New
Margin of victory		8,080	14.53	▼19.06
Turnout		56,378	77.79	▲1.67
Total valid votes		55,593		
Rejected ballots		785	1.39	▲1.39
Registered electors		72,476		▲21.33
INC(I) gain from INC		Swing	▼2.91	

=== Assembly Election 1972 ===
1972 Mysore State Legislative Assembly election : Udupi
Party	Candidate	Votes	%	±%
INC	Manorama Madhwaraj	26,020	58.49	▲25.14
ABJS	V. S. Acharya	11,076	24.90	New
Independent	Surendranath Malpe	3,536	7.95	New
Independent	Shridhara. M. Kalmady	2,531	5.69	New
Independent	Perody Vittal Shetty	919	2.07	New
SSP	Govinda Shetty	403	0.91	New
Margin of victory		14,944	33.59	▲30.39
Turnout		45,469	76.12	▲2.44
Total valid votes		44,485		
Registered electors		59,733		▲17.18
INC hold		Swing	▲25.14	

=== Assembly Election 1967 ===
1967 Mysore State Legislative Assembly election : Udupi
Party	Candidate	Votes	%	±%
INC	S. K. Amin	11,737	33.35	▼20.23
PSP	Upendra Nayak	10,611	30.15	▲5.66
Independent	K. M. Suvarna	8,418	23.92	New
SWA	P. S. Bhat	2,350	6.68	New
Independent	K. Lakshminarayanabhat	1,414	4.02	New
Independent	S. Rai	662	1.88	New
Margin of victory		1,126	3.20	▼25.89
Turnout		37,561	73.68	▲1.12
Total valid votes		35,192		
Registered electors		50,976		▲8.83
INC hold		Swing	▼20.23	

=== Assembly Election 1962 ===
1962 Mysore State Legislative Assembly election : Udupi
Party	Candidate	Votes	%	±%
INC	M. Madhvaraja	17,511	53.58	▲10.55
PSP	Upendra Nayak	8,003	24.49	▼32.48
CPI	K. Dasa Serigara	5,395	16.51	New
ABJS	Devaprasada Setty	1,774	5.43	New
Margin of victory		9,508	29.09	▲15.15
Turnout		33,986	72.56	▲3.28
Total valid votes		32,683		
Registered electors		46,841		▲5.06
INC gain from PSP		Swing	▼3.39	

=== Assembly Election 1957 ===
1957 Mysore State Legislative Assembly election : Udupi
Party	Candidate	Votes	%	±%
PSP	Upendra Nayak	17,598	56.97	New
INC	Achar. P. V	13,291	43.03	▼7.60
Margin of victory		4,307	13.94	▼2.95
Turnout		30,889	69.28	▲0.51
Total valid votes		30,889		
Registered electors		44,585		▼38.66
PSP gain from INC		Swing	▲6.34	

=== Assembly Election 1952 ===
1952 Madras State Legislative Assembly election : Udupi
Party	Candidate	Votes	%	±%
INC	T. A. Pai	25,309	50.63	New
KMPP	K. Rama Rao	16,865	33.74	New
Socialist	Vithaldas. N	7,810	15.62	New
Margin of victory		8,444	16.89	
Turnout		49,984	68.77	
Total valid votes		49,984		
Registered electors		72,683		
INC win (new seat)				

== See also ==
- Udupi district
- List of constituencies of Karnataka Legislative Assembly
