= Yashpal Anand Suvarna =

Indian politician

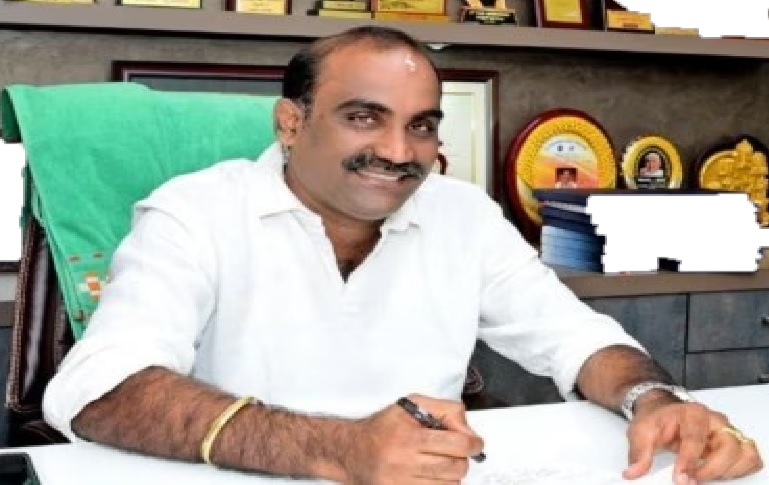

Member of Legislative Assembly Karnataka
- Incumbent
- Assumed office 13 May 2023
- Preceded by: K. Raghupati Bhat
- Constituency: Udupi

Personal details
- Party: Bharatiya Janatha Party
- Occupation: Politician, businessmen

Yashpal Anand Suvarna, is an Indian politician and businessman from Udupi, Karnataka. He serves as General Secretary of the BJP National OBC Morcha. He is a vice president of the Udupi Government Pre-University College Development Committee. He was elected as the MLA from Udupi Assembly constituency from the BJP Karnataka for the 2023 Karnataka Legislative Assembly

== Biography ==
Suvarna has been the president of the Cooperative Fish Marketing Federation in Dakshina Kannada and Udupi districts for 13 years.
