= Mulur =

- Village
- Location in Karnataka, India
- Coordinates: 13.20°N 74.75°E
- Country: India
- State: Karnataka
- District: Udupi

Population (2001)
  - Total: 5,057

Languages
  - Regional: Tulu
- Time zone: UTC+5:30 (IST)
- Postal code: 574117
- Vehicle registration: KA20

Muloor is a census town in kaup taluk of Udupi District the Indian state of Karnataka.

It lies between the cities of Udupi and Mangalore, next to the National Highway 66. It is 15 km south of Udupi and 45 km north of Mangalore.

== Demographics ==
As of 2001 India census, Muloor had a population of 5057. Males constitute 46% of the population and females 54%. Muloor has an average literacy rate of 76%, higher than the national average of 59.5%: male literacy is 79%, and female literacy is 73%. In Muloor, 10% of the population is under 6 years of age. The main occupation of the people living here is Fishing and Farming.
