= Yedthare =

Place in Karnataka, India

Yadthare Byndoor
- Town
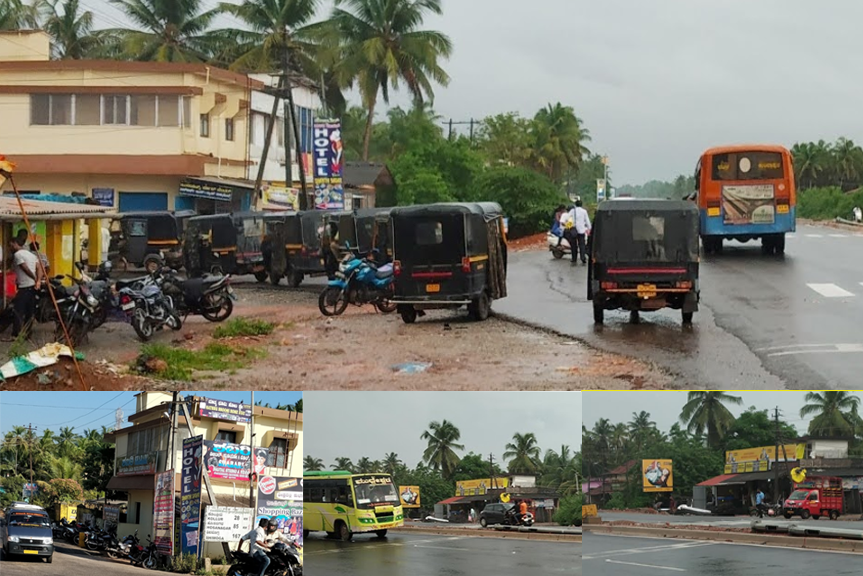
- Yadthare Kollur Bypass
- Country: India
- State: Karnataka
- District: Udupi
- Talukas: Byndoor

Government
  - Body: Town Municipality

Population (2001)
  - Total: 24,986

Languages
  - Official: Kannada
- Time zone: UTC+5:30 (IST)
- ISO 3166 code: IN-KA
- Vehicle registration: KA
- Website: baindurutown.mrc.gov.in

Yedthare is a locality in Byndoor Town. It is a part of Byndoor Town Panchayat. India. It is located in the Byndoor taluk of Udupi district in Karnataka.

== Demographics ==
As of 2001 India census, Yedthare had a population of 9170 with 4391 males and 4779 females.

== See also ==
- Byndoor
- Districts of Karnataka
- Paduvari
- Taggarse
