= Taggarse =

Coordinates: 13°53′N 74°38′E

- Town
- Interactive map of Taggarse
- Country: India
- State: Karnataka
- District: Udupi
- Talukas: Byndoor

Government
  - Body: Town Panchayat

Population (2001)
  - Total: 24,968

Languages
  - Official: [[Kannada], [Konkani]]
- Time zone: UTC+5:30 (IST)
- Vehicle registration: KA
- Website: www.baindurutown.mrc.gov.in

Taggarse is a locality in Byndoor Town, Karnataka, India.It is a part of Byndoor Town Panchayat. It is located in the Byndoor taluk of Udupi district in Karnataka.

== Demographics ==
As of 2001 India census, Taggarse had a population of 6243 with 2893 males and 3350 females.

== See also ==
- Byndoor
- Yedthare
- Paduvari
- Udupi
