= 52 Heroor =

52nd Heroor
- Village
- Location in Karnataka, India 52nd Heroor (India)
- Coordinates: 13.4242000°N 74.762108°E
- Country: India
- State: Karnataka
- District: Udupi
- Talukas: Udupi

Government
  - Body: Village Panchayat

Languages
  - Official: Kannada, Tulu
- Time zone: UTC+5:30 (IST)
- ISO 3166 code: IN-KA
- Vehicle registration: KA
- Nearest city: Udupi
- Civic agency: Village Panchayat
- Website: karnataka.gov.in

52 Heroor is a village in the southern state of Karnataka, India. It is located in the Udupi taluk of Udupi district in Karnataka.

This village has factories like Supreme feeds, Krishna Dairy and Hangyo Ice Cream.

== See also ==
- Districts of Karnataka
