= Kallianpur =

- Suburb
- Location in Karnataka, India Kallianpur (India)
- Coordinates: 13.384276°N 74.730978°E
- Country: India
- State: Karnataka
- District: Udupi
- City: Udupi

Languages
  - Official: Kannada
  - Regional: Tulu, Konkani, Beary Bashe
- Time zone: UTC+5:30 (IST)
- PIN: 576114
- Telephone code: 0820
- Vehicle registration: KA20
- Nearest city: Udupi

Kallianpur (previously anglicised as Calliampore) is a hamlet of Tonse East village about six km from Udupi. It is developed with all modern amenities like schools, colleges, hospitals, good transport and communication facilities. The people of Kallianpur have survived many ages and still retain great positions with attachment to their culture. Some still associate their surnames to their village Kallianpur.

== Location ==
Kallianpur is situated on the southern bank of the river Swarna and is about four km east of the Arabian Sea coast. This place is not the Kalliana mentioned in the Periplus as was at one time supposed, but may probably be the Kalliana mentioned by Kosmos Indico-pleustes. It has the ruins of a fort belonging to the Vijayanagara days. It has temples of Kenchamma, Veerabhadra, Mahalingeshvara, Ganapati and Venkataramana belonging to the later Vijayanagara period. Kallianpur had its hey days during the rule of the Keladi Nayakas.

== Temples ==
=== Sri Venkatramana temple ===
Kallianpur Temple

Kallianpur has a famous Sri Venkatramana temple, which is considered to be about 350 years old. The idol of the presiding deity, Lord Krishna, was recovered from the river Swarna which flows near the temple. This temple was renovated twice and recently in 1990. "Karthika masa depostsava" in the month of November, "Kanakabhisheka" in the month of January, "Varamahalaxmi Vrita" in the month of August, "Chandika Homa" in the month of September are the main religious functions being held here. Gowda Saraswat Brahmins (GSB) form the main community here with Konkani as their mother tongue. Dr. T.M.A Pai, an eminent educationalist, philanthropist and the founder of Manipal hailed from this village.-people still with surname "Kallianpur" in front of their first name are the remnants of a great generation of forefathers.

At Kallianpura another temple which is now being renovated Sri Kenchamma Temple which is Gramadevata. The Oldest temple of the Kallianpur is Sri Mahalingeshwara Temple popularly known as Eshwara Temple.

At Arkalabettu near Kallianpur there is a beautiful image of Narayana with his several attributes; it is probably of the Vijayanagara period. At Uppoor, an adjacent village, there is a shrine of Ganesha built in the Vijayanagara style; its image is exquisitely carved. Uppoor was once said to have been the birthplace of Madhwacharya, but now Pajaka kshetra has been recognised by his followers as his birthplace.

== Churches ==
=== Milagres Cathedral ===
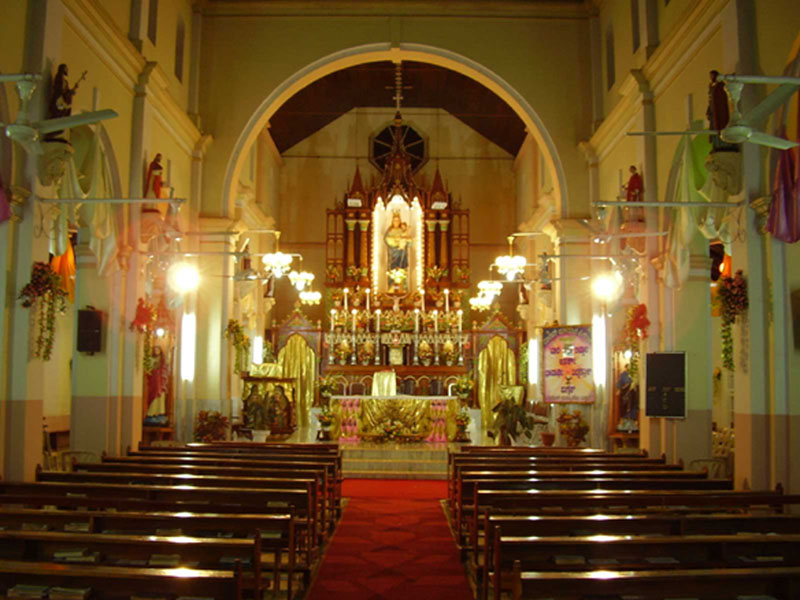
Milagres Cathedral

The Milagres Cathedral is a Cathedral dedicated to Our Lady of Miracles. Built about the same time as the Milagres church, Mangalore, it was founded according to the treaty between the Portuguese and Queen Keladi Chennamma of Bednore who ruled over Canara from 1671 to 1697. In 1678, the Portuguese hierarchy of Goa established this church of 'Nostra Senhora de Milagres' (Our Lady of the Miracles), popularly known as the Milagres Church. Tipu Sultan destroyed this church in 1784. After the return of the captives from Srirangapatna, the church was rebuilt in 1806. The existing structure was constructed in 1941.

Today the parish has more than 400 families as its parishioners. It also runs 2 schools and a college.

=== Mount Rosary Church ===
The place has another Catholic place of worship named the Mount Rosary Church or Church of the Mount Rosary, which came into existence in 1837 at the time of the Goan schism when some Catholic families withdrew from their Parish Church of Our Lady of Miracles and acknowledged the jurisdiction of the Vicar Apostolic of Verapoly. They built a church only a few yards away from the Milagres Cathedral. Since then it has undergone alterations and additions.

== Other institutions ==
The Milagres church operates two primary schools, two high schools, PU college, Degree college and a PG institution (Commerce & Social work). The Sisters of Queen of the Apostles congregation maintain the Goretti hospital and Ozanam, a home for the aged. Recently an ultra modern centre named Cynthia Fernandes Memorial Palliative Care Centre was set up with a view to rehabilitating and caring for cancer patients. The Mount Rosary Church also runs an English Medium School.

Various banks like Syndicate Bank, Canara Bank, ICICI Bank, Corporation Bank, Vijaya Bank, State Bank Of India have their branches here.
