= Varamballi =

Varambally Varambally
- village
- Interactive map of Varambally
- Coordinates: 13°26′04″N 74°43′36″E
- Country: India
- State: Karnataka
- District: Udupi
- Talukas: Udupi
- Elevation: 29 m (95 ft)

Population (2001)
  - Total: 6,178

Languages
  - Official: Kannada
- Time zone: UTC+5:30 (IST)
- Vehicle registration: KA 20
- Nearest city: Udupi

Varambally is a village in the southern state of Karnataka, India. It is located in the Udupi taluk of Udupi district in Karnataka.

== Demographics ==
As of 2001 India census, Varambally had a population of 6178 with 3002 males and 3176 females.

== See also ==
- Udupi
- Districts of Karnataka
