= Kuthpady =

- Town
- Location in Karnataka, India Kuthpady (India)
- Coordinates: 13.3258641°N 74.7249281°E
- Country: India
- State: Karnataka
- District: Udupi

Languages
  - Official: Tulu, Kannada
- Time zone: UTC+5:30 (IST)
- PIN: 574118
- Telephone code: 0820
- Vehicle registration: KA20
- Nearest city: Udupi

Kuthpady is a village in the Udupi District in the state of Karnataka on the west coast of India. Kuthpady is located 4.5 km from the town of Udupi, around 11 km from Manipal, around 10 km from Malpe Port and beach.

Kuthpady is in Udupi taluk of Udupi district. Languages spoken in the region include Kannada, Tulu, Konkani and Byari.

Kuthpady is famous for the SDM Ayurveda Hospital and College, Mangodu Subramanya Temple, Vasuki Subramanya Temple, and Kanangi Temple (Bramha, Vishnu and Maheshwara Temple) which is one of its kind, Ramakrishna Bhajana Mandira. Every year thousands of people visit the Subramanya temples during Subramanya Shrasthi, which falls in November and December.
