= Bankerkatta =

- Village
- Location in Udupi, Karnataka, India
- Coordinates: 13.343340°N 74.717737°E
- Country: India
- State: Karnataka
- District: Udupi
- Taluk: Udupi

Languages
  - Official Local: Kannada Tulu
- Time zone: UTC+5:30 (IST)
- PIN: 576103
- Vehicle registration: KA-20

Bankerkatta is a small village in Udupi district, Karnataka, India. It falls under Kidiyoor Gram Panchayat. It is located at approximately 4 km from Udupi city. Malpe Beach is just 4.8 km from Bankerkatta.

The local language spoken by people is Tulu. People can also speak and read Kannada.

The climate is hot and humid throughout the year since it is close to Arabian Sea. This region experiences heavy rainfall from June to October.
