= Church of Our Lady of Rosary, Kallianpur =

Mount Rosary Church
- Igreja Nossa Senhora do Rosario; Church of Our Lady of Rosary
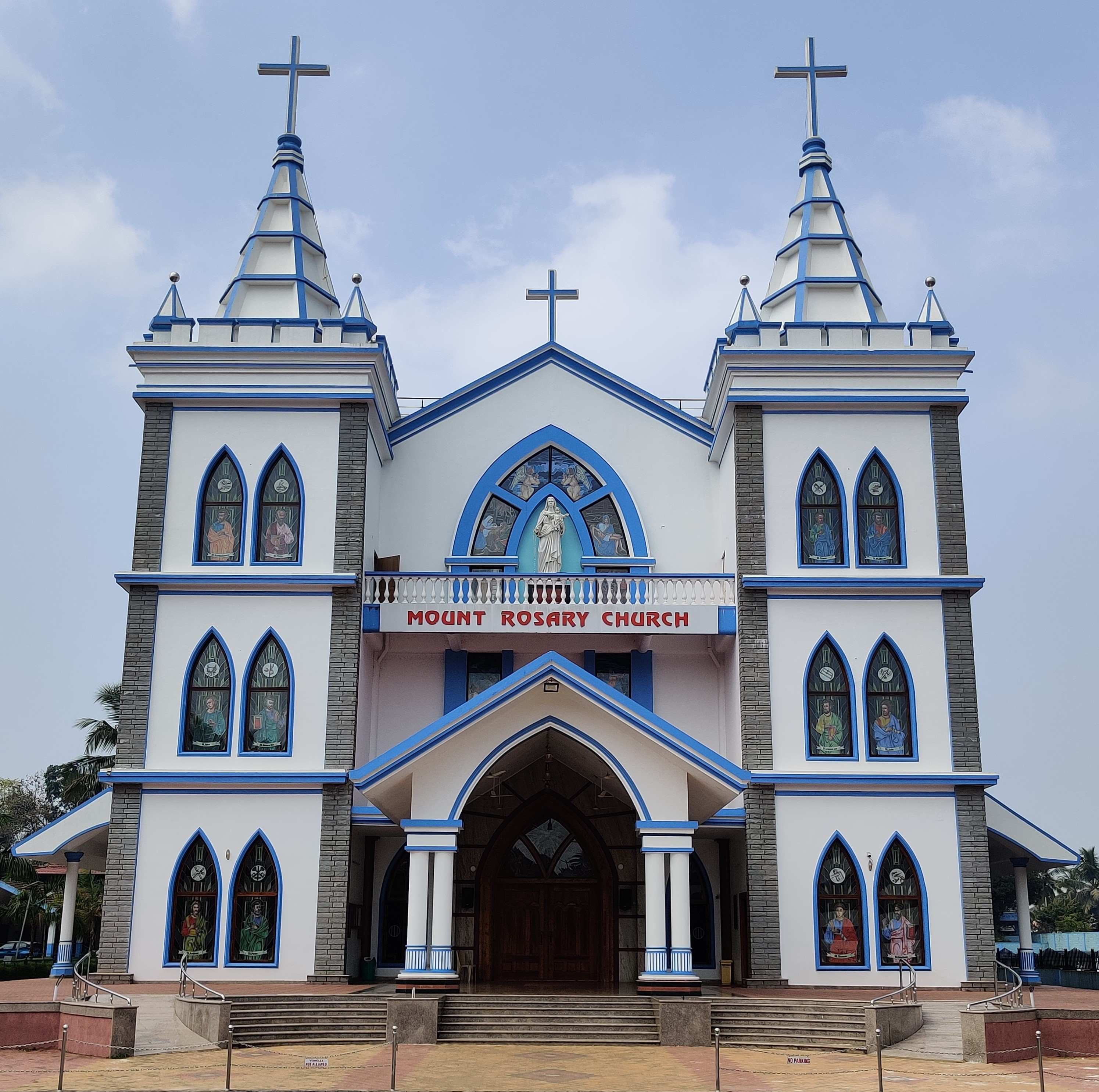
- Entrance of the church

- Location within Karnataka
- 13.386989°N 74.7255226°E
- Location: Kallianpur, Udupi district, Karnataka
- Country: India
- Denomination: Roman Catholic (Latin rite)
- Website: www.mountrosarychurch.com

History
- Status: Church
- Founded: 1837

Architecture
- Functional status: active
- Designated: 1837
- Construction cost: Rs. 80,000,000

Specifications
- Height: 95 ft (29 m)

Administration
- Province: Roman Catholic Archdiocese of Bangalore
- Diocese: Roman Catholic Diocese of Udupi
- Deanery: Kallianpur
- Parish: santhekatte

Clergy
- Bishop: Most.Rev.Dr.Gerald Isaac Lobo
- Vicar: Rev.Fr. Roque D'Souza

Mount Rosary Church (Portuguese: De Nossa Senhora do Rosario de Calliampoor) is a Roman Catholic Church situated in Kallianpur, a suburb of Udupi City in the Udupi district of India.

== History ==
The church came into existence in 1837 at the time of the Goan schism when some Catholic families withdrew from their parish Milagres Cathedral and acknowledged the jurisdiction of the Vicar Apostolic of Verapoly. They built a church a few yards away from Milagres Cathedral. Since then it has undergone alterations and additions. It is strategically located close to the NH 66.

In 1880, Fr Albert D’Souza (1879–1890) decided to build a new church, and the location was moved to Nejar Hill. The foundation stone of the new church was blessed by the Bishop of Mangalore, the Most Rev. Pagani, on 26 November 1880. Due to paucity of funds, Fr Albert D’Souza could not complete the church. At this juncture, Mattheus Rebello, hereditary Patel of Kallianpurl, pledged his property, took a loan and completed the church building. The first mass was in the newly constructed tiled roof church building was offered on 14 May 1882. On 9 January 1883, the statue of the Holy Rosary was installed in the church. The church also received some land from the Patel, Ignatius Fernandes.

The expansion of the church was carried out in gradual stages. Fr J.M. Masse (1890–1916) built the presbytery in 1895, and Fr John Salvadore Mathais constructed the portico. Fr Piedade Saldanha (1931–1938) built a shrine to commemorate the centenary of the church in 1937. Fr Rosario Denis Sequeira (1957–1967) built the grotto.

The sesqui-centennial (1837–1987) celebrations were held in 1987 during the time of Fr Victor Saldanha. The cost of construction of the new belfry was donated by the Rebello family members in memory of the late Louis and Leticia Rebello. The new belfry was inaugurated on 30 January 1999. Fr Godfrey Saldanha completed the church hall, which was inaugurated on 4 January 2001, by Most Rev Dr Leo Cornelio of Khandwa diocese, who was the Archbishop of Bhopal at that time.

== Annexed Buildings ==
Realizing the need for education for girls, a primary school for them was started in 1925, and it was handed over to the Carmelite Sisters in 1933.

On 1 June 1958, Lourdes Hospital, built by Msgr R Denis Sequeira was inaugurated. This was handed over to the Sisters of the Queen of the Apostles in 1962.

Realizing the importance of English education following the government's liberalization and globalization policy, Fr Godfrey Linus Aurelius Saldanha began Mount Rosary English Medium School in 1997. The new school building was inaugurated on 1 June 1999.

== Present structure ==
Mount Rosary Church completed 175 years of existence in 2012. To mark the event and provide sufficient space to the ever-increasing parishioners, Parish Priest Fr. Philip Neri Aranha, who had taken charge of the parish since 2010, consulted with the Parish Pastoral Council and the parishioners and decided to rebuild the church.

To raise the new church, a prominent site where the previous Mount Rosary church existed was selected. The foundation stone was blessed by the Bishop of the Mangalore Diocese, the Most Rev. Dr. Aloysius Paul D’Souza, during the Mass that was held at the Millennium auditorium on 3 March 2012. The stone was laid at the site in the presence of a large number of parishioners, including Jerry Vincent Dias, vice president of the Parish Pastoral Council; Secretary Richard Dias; and former vice presidents Stany Cornelio, Prof Ligory Aranha and Benedict Menezes.

The construction work of the church went on for two years and nine months.

The new building of the 178-year-old Mount Rosary Church was inaugurated on Tuesday, 6 January 2015 by Jerry Vincent Dais and Molly Dias, vice president of parish pastoral council. The inauguration Mass was celebrated by Rt. Rev. Dr. Aloysius Paul D'souza (Bishop of the Mangalore Diocese). Thousands of devotees witnessed the inauguration and blessing of the newly built church.

The church is spacious enough to comfortably accommodate 1200 people. The church is 115 feet long, 76 feet wide and 60 feet high. The high altar has been executed by renowned artists and architects from Korathi, Kerala. The church has an adoration chapel which is fully air-conditioned. The wooden cross on the high altar, the tinted glass windows depicting different episodes from the Bible, the mosaic style Way of the Cross, the beautiful statues of saints and above all, the statue of Our Lady of Mount Rosary are the chief attractions of the church.
