= St. Mary's Islands =

St. Mary's Islands Thonsepar
- Island
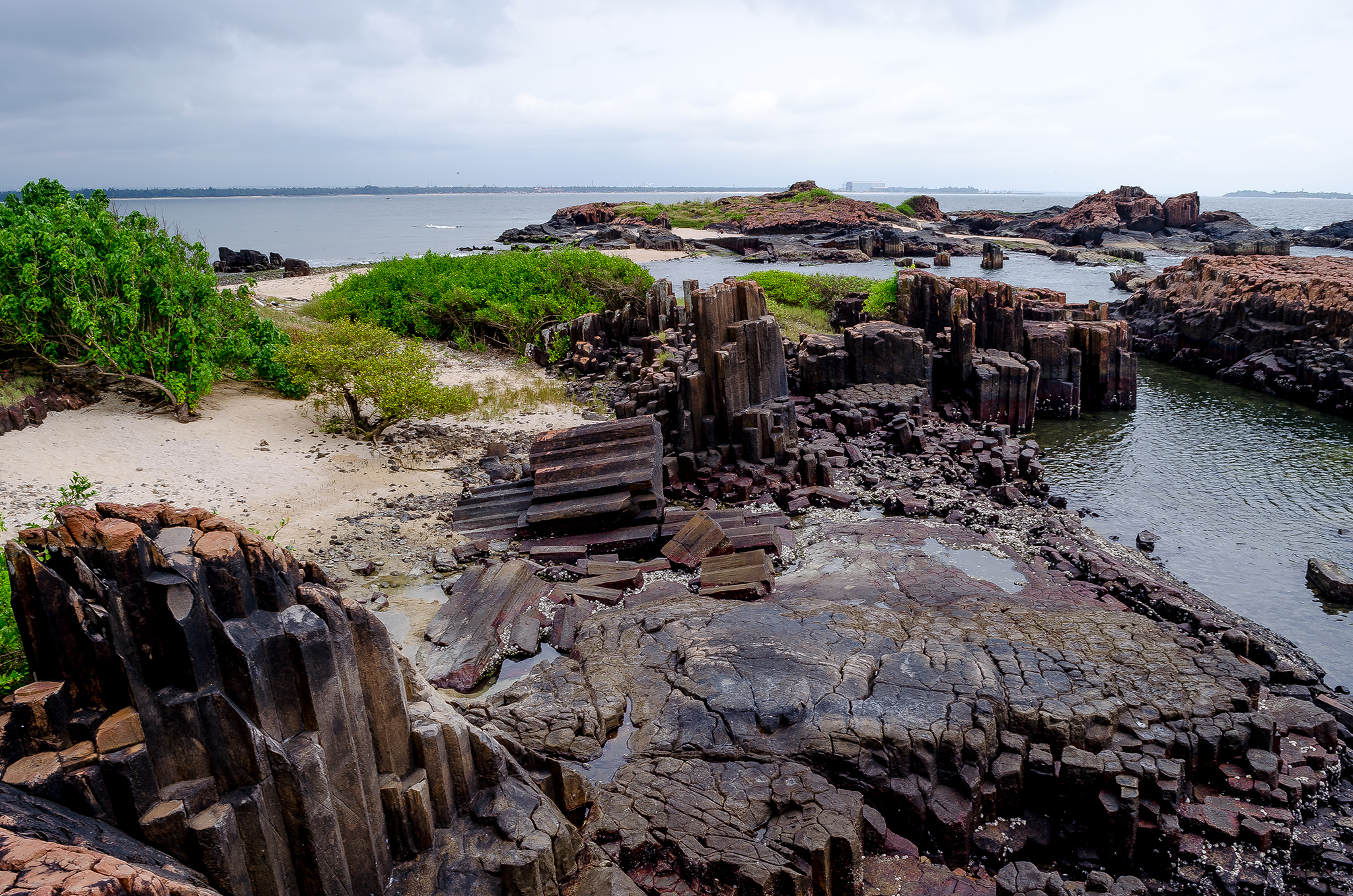
- Columnar basalt formations

- Location in Karnataka, India
- Coordinates: 13.3795°N 74.6730°E
- Country: India
- State: Karnataka
- District: Udupi
- Elevation: 10 m (33 ft)

Population
  - Total: 0
- Time zone: UTC+5:30 (IST)

National Geological Monuments of India
- Official name: Columnar Basalt, Coconut Islands
- Designated: 1975

St. Mary's Islands, also locally known as Thonsepar (literally "Coconut Islands") are a set of four small uninhabited islands in the Arabian Sea off the coast of Malpe in Udupi district of the Indian state of Karnataka. The islands are known for their distinctive geological formation of columnar rhyolitic lava, and were declared as National Geological Monuments by the Geological Survey of India in 1975. Scientific studies indicate that the basalt of the islands was formed by subaerial subvolcanic activity more than 90 million years ago.

== History ==
During the Portuguese discovery of the sea route to India in 1498, Vasco da Gama landed on the islands. He fixed a Christian cross and named one of these islands O Padrão de Santa Maria (The Pillar of St. Mary) in Portuguese, as a dedication to Mary, mother of Jesus, before proceeding to Calicut in the Malabar Coast.

After the distinctive geological formation of columnar rhyolitic lava was discovered in the islands, it was declared as a National Geological Monument by the Geological Survey of India in 1975.

== Geography and topography ==
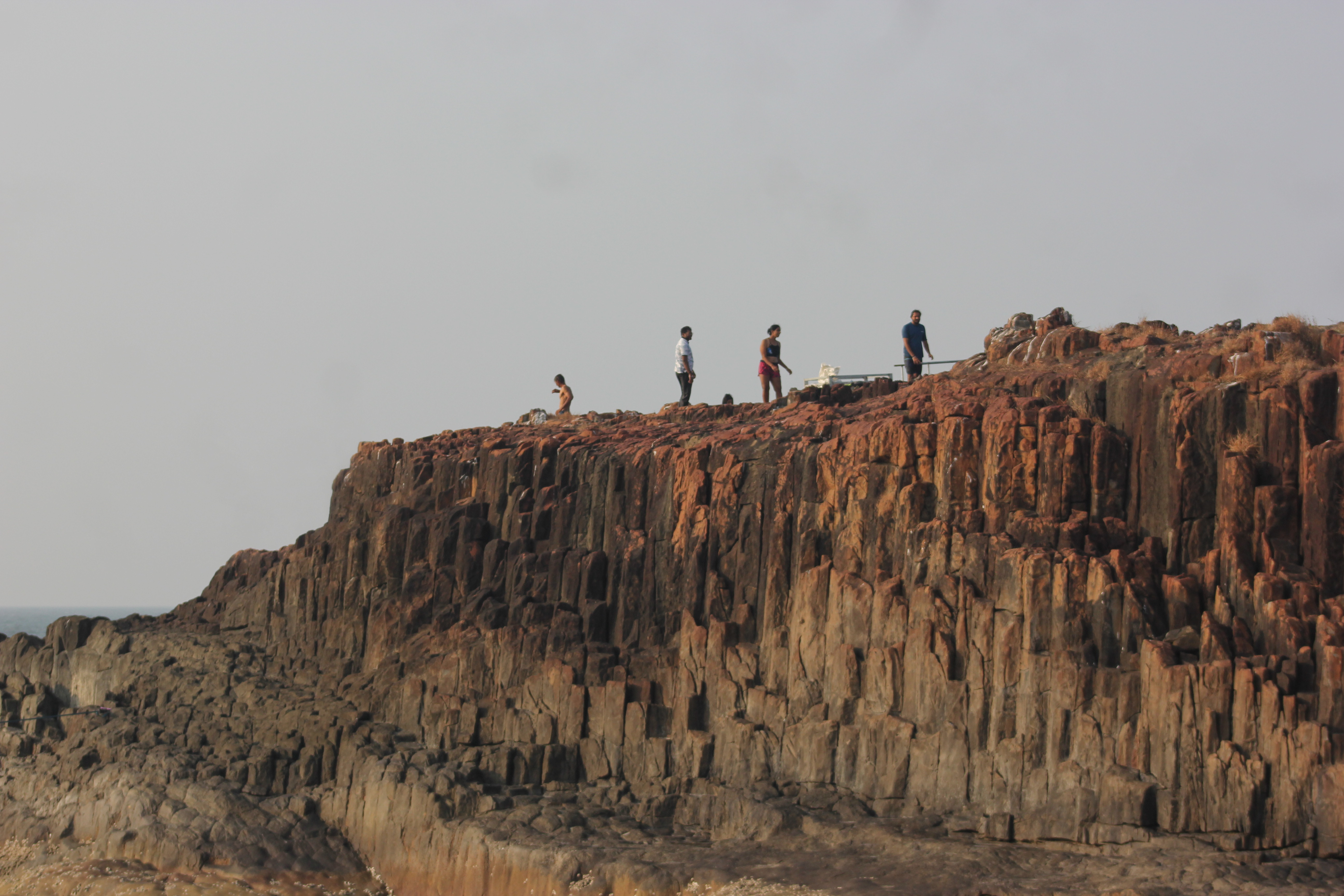
The highest point on St. Mary's Islands

Out of the four islands, the northernmost island has a basaltic rock formation in a hexagonal form, the only one of its type in India such as Malpe and others. The island covers an area which is about 500 m (1,600 ft) in length and 100 m (330 ft) in width. It has prominent coconut trees, its cover reflecting an azure south sea colour, and hence the island is also called Coconut Island. There is no habitation on the islands.

The north–south aligned islands form a non-continuous chain. The four largest islands are Coconut Island, North Island, Daryabahadurgarh Island and South Island. The islands are generally aligned parallel to the coast line, which provide clues to the phenomenon of uplift of the west coast of India. The islands' terraces and elevated beach deposits along with the tide gauge data at the dead oyster beach in Suratkal (further south of the islands) have been deduced as proof of the reported fall in sea level of about 1 mm/per year.

The highest elevation at Coconut Island is about 10 m (33 ft) above mean sea level with surrounding areas in the form of platforms in the elevation range of +6 m (20 ft), +3 m (9.8 ft), +1.5 m (4 ft 11 in) and along the sea level, which are stated to have been formed by wave action pointing to several episodes of rising sea levels or sinking of the land.

== Geology ==
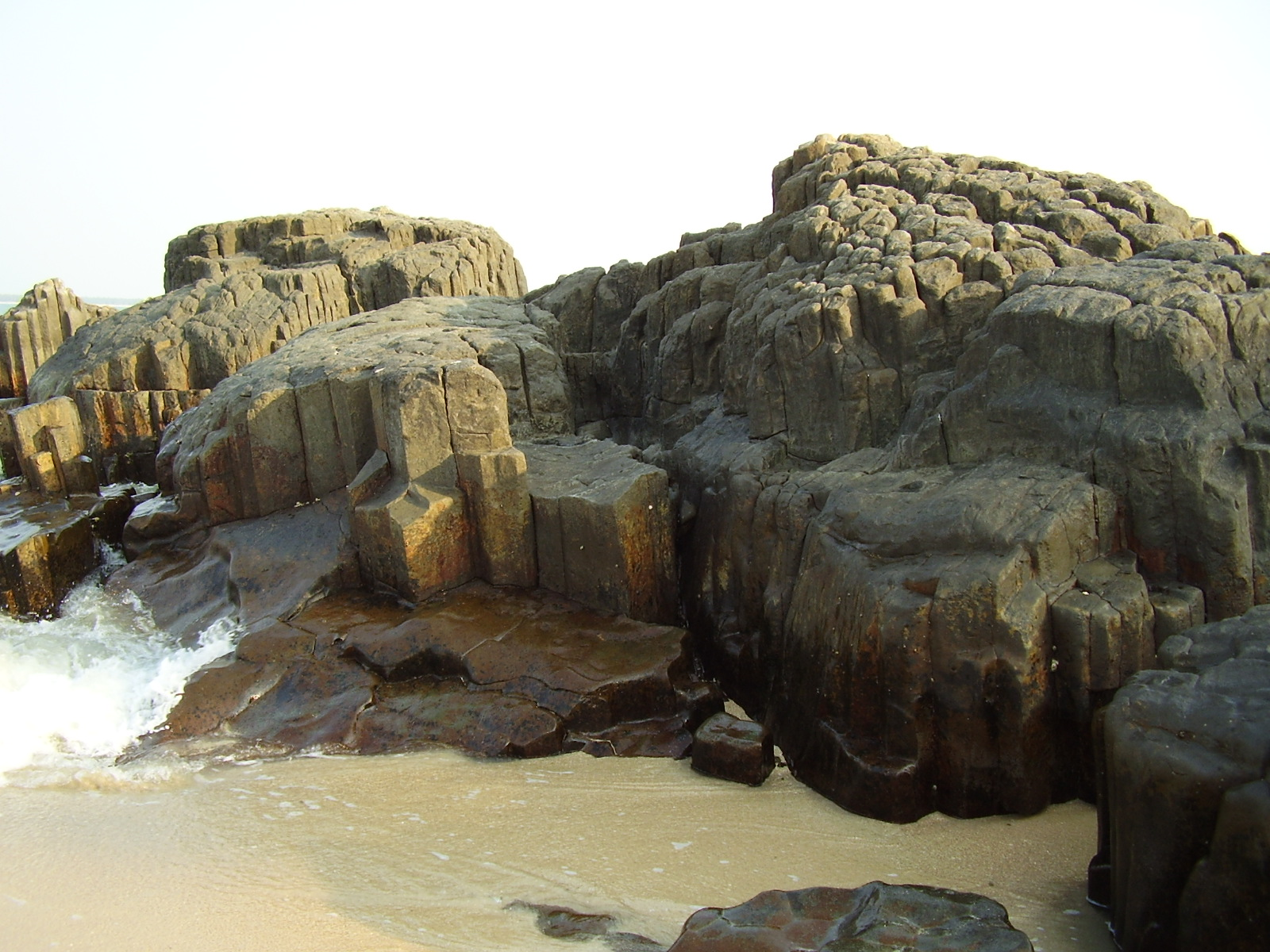
A view of basaltic rock formation in St. Mary's Islands

The columnar basaltic lava found in these Islands, which is very well developed in the basalts of Deccan Traps, exhibit an imposing range of hexagonal shaped or multi-faced (polygonal) columns split into a horizontal mosaic. In geological terms these are called columnar joints. The lava rocks form regular five, six or seven-sided pillars, called "laminar lava", and are found in varying heights in all the islands; the tallest of the columns is about 6 m (20 ft). Considering the importance and rarity of such an occurrence, these islands were classified as a National Geological Monument in 2001 by the Geological Survey of India.

The Deccan Traps that formed during Cretaceous–Eocene time about 60 million years ago emerged from the vast deluge of hot molten basaltic lava in the western part of India which is now seen as flat topped hills and step like terraces. Scientific studies carried out at the Indian Institute of Technology, Bombay on the petrology, palaeomagnetism and volcanics of the rocks of the island has brought out the following facts.

- Islands comprise fully of igneous rocks. They have acid composition that consist of dacites, rhyodacites, rhyolites and granophyres and carry basic patches.
- The columnar jointing pattern is well developed on Coconut Island.
- Mineralogically, plagioclase, K-feldspar, quartz, ortho- and clinopyroxenes, olivine, magnetite, and ilmenite are recorded in the ground mass phases
- Magnetic granulometric studies (susceptibility and hysteresis at different temperatures) of island rock samples indicate the presence of a multi domain (MD) state of magnetite. It is inferred that: "the formation of MD could have affected the stability and consistency of magnetic directions in these rocks" and that "this igneous body has been either annealed or could be an intrusive."

An analysis of palaeomagnetic data from India and Madagascar hypothesizes a new India–Madagascar fit related to the Late Cretaceous, directly prior to and during the early phase of Madagascar–India separation. A scientific study published in 2002 states that "St. Mary magmatism is linked to the initial break–up between India and Madagascar, and magmatism probably resulted from rift related extensional processes initially induced by the Marion hotspot underlying southern Madagascar during the Late Cretaceous."

=== Geological age ===
There are different theories on the age of the St. Mary's Islands rocks. In the analysis reported in the above section it has been further concluded that the multi domain (MD) state found in these rocks are uncommon in the Deccan Traps and non-existent in the Rajmahal Traps. Six selected samples from the islands were subject to whole rock K-Ar dating. This yielded a mean age of 93.1±2.4 (2σ) vis-à-vis the age of the Rajmahal Traps of about 105-100 Ma and about 66-35 Ma of the Deccan Traps. With this appreciation, the author has concluded that the igneous activity of St. Mary's Islands may represent Cretaceous-Tertiary igneous activity.

In a further analysis of the age of the break-up of Greater India (India plus Seychelles) and Madagascar it has been inferred to have occurred in the Upper Cretaceous at 88 Ma. The strength of this inference is based on the approach that the Felsic volcanics (rhyolites and Rhyodacites) of the St. Mary's Islands (SMI), Southern India, were originally interpreted as a distant outlier of the 66 Ma Deccan volcanic province of west–central India, comprising dominantly flood basalts. Later studies had dated it at 93 Ma by the K-Ar dating technique. Since the technique used was a simple use of an average of five out of six widely varying dates and arbitrary data selectivity chosen, the results were not considered reliable. A method of ^{40}Ar–^{39}Ar (argon–argon dating) of the SMI volcanic yields is reportedly more reliable of the plateau and isochron ages. The weighted mean isochron age is reported to be 85.6±0.9 Ma (2σ). The K–Ar (potassium-argon dating) technique adopted for the southern Indian Precambrian terrain, intruded by numerous mafic–doleritic dyke swarms, the age from Proterozoic to the latest Cretaceous is reported as 69–66 Ma (Deccan-related). The two regional dykes (a leucograbbro and a felsite) from the Kerala region of southwestern India, which were also dated earlier, indicate the age as 85 Ma. Madagascar flood basalt province's ^{40}Ar–^{39}Ar ages of 89–85 Ma tallies with the SMI volcanic age. The conclusion drawn by the study is that the Madagascar flood basalt province, the SMI volcanics, and possibly the Kerala dykes may well represent volcanic activity associated with the break-up of Greater India and Madagascar, in the Upper Cretaceous at 88 Ma.

Another scientific study on the biogeographic and tectonic history of India reported that: "Although real breaks among the lands were indicated by the physical data, faunal links were maintained by agile animals that were able to surmount minor marine barriers. India, during its northward journey, remained close to Africa and Madagascar even as it began to contact Eurasia."

== Biodiversity ==
A detailed description of the flora and fauna of the islands was compiled in a manual by John Sturrocks, the district collector of Mangalore in 1894. The largely barren St. Mary's islands, due to coconut palm-fringed coast, is also called the "Coconut Island" (locally known as Thonsepar). The sparse inland vegetation is restricted to hardy shrubbery capable of growing in shallow, rocky soil and sandy terrain.

The island's rocky shores is a breeding site or stopover for various birds. Colonies of gulls, Scolopacidae (sandpipers) and a few crows have been sighted on the Islands. On the approach to the Islands from the Malpe beach, brahminy kites (Haliastur indus), great white egrets, grey egrets (breeding plumage) and groups of large Asian green bee-eaters have been recorded. There is presence of corals in the surrounding waters. The western coasts of the St. Mary's islands are abundant beachcombing and seashell haven with seashells of various shapes and sizes littered along the coast. The columnar basaltic rock formations provide a unique, rocky habitat that supports seaweeds and small crustaceans. Its marine life is dominated by 52 taxa of macroalgae (seaweeds), including 16 Chlorophyceae (green algae), 19 Phaeophyceae (brown algae), and Rhodophyceae (red algae).

== Tourism ==
St. Mary's Islands are popular among tourists for their unique geology unique volcanic hexagonal columnar basalt rock formations, and small coral patches and rocky outcrops that support marine life such as clownfish and butterflyfish, making them suitable for snorkeling and scuba diving tours which can be booked from Malpe beach jetty. The beach has security guards who ensure that visitors do not venture into danger zones of the islands.

== Transport ==
The island can be accessed by boat from Malpe, a fishing harbor 5 km west of Udupi, the administrative headquarters of the district. Regular ferries and boats operate from Malpe Beach and the Tegma jetty from 9 am to 5:30 pm with an average frequency of 20 minutes, except the monsoon season (June to September).

Mangalore International Airport at Mangalore, is 58 km (36 mi) south of Malape. Udupi railway station (Station Code: UD) on the Konkan Railway, located 4 km (2.5 mi) from Malape, is the nearest railhead. Malape is connected by road to Udupi, which forms part of the NH66 which runs the entire length of Coastal Karnataka (called "Kanara"), NH169A to eastern and central Karnataka via Shimoga (Shivamogga), and Karnataka State Highway 37 to Sestern Gahats in southwest.

== Gallery ==
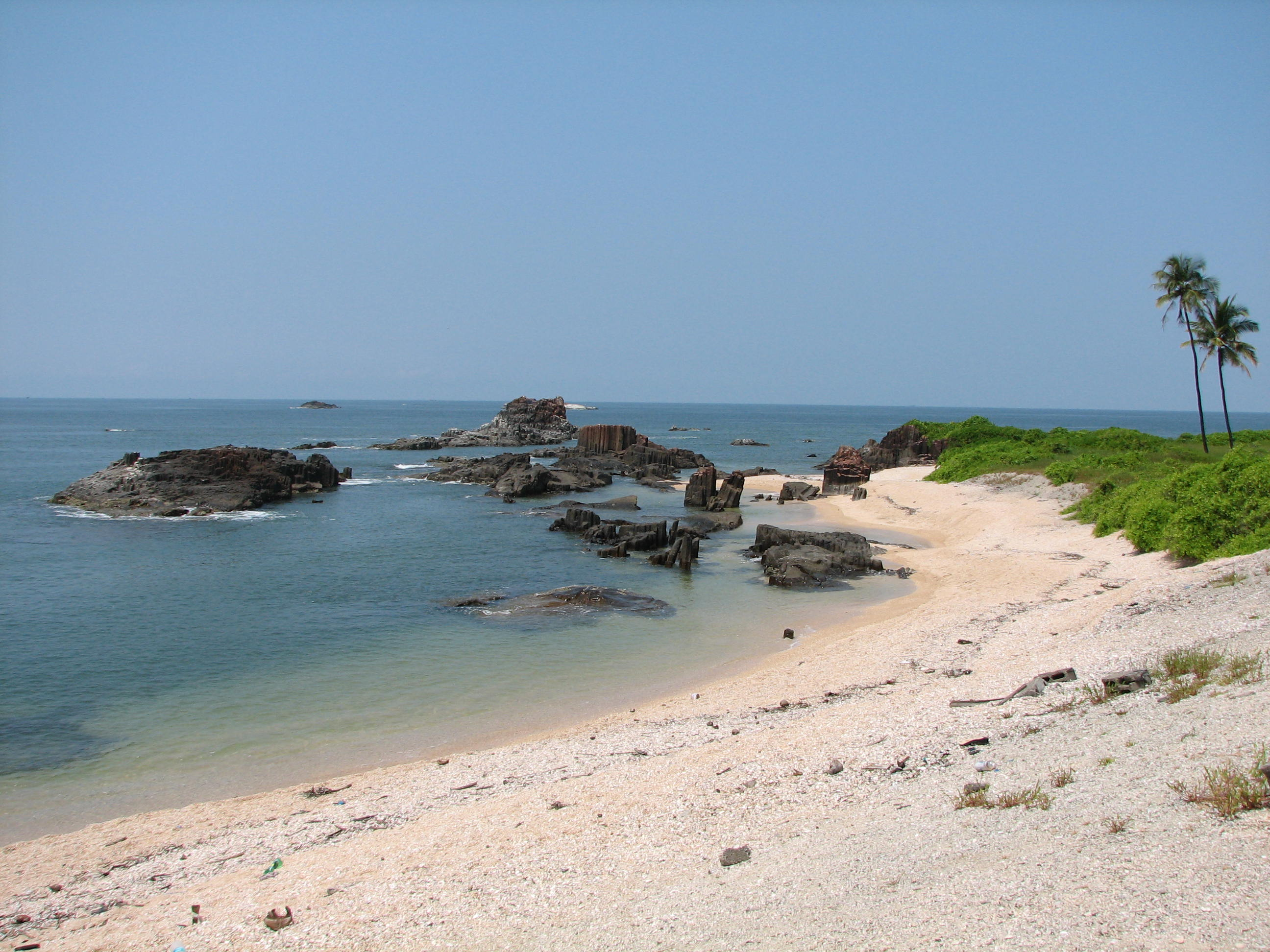
Beach on one of the islands

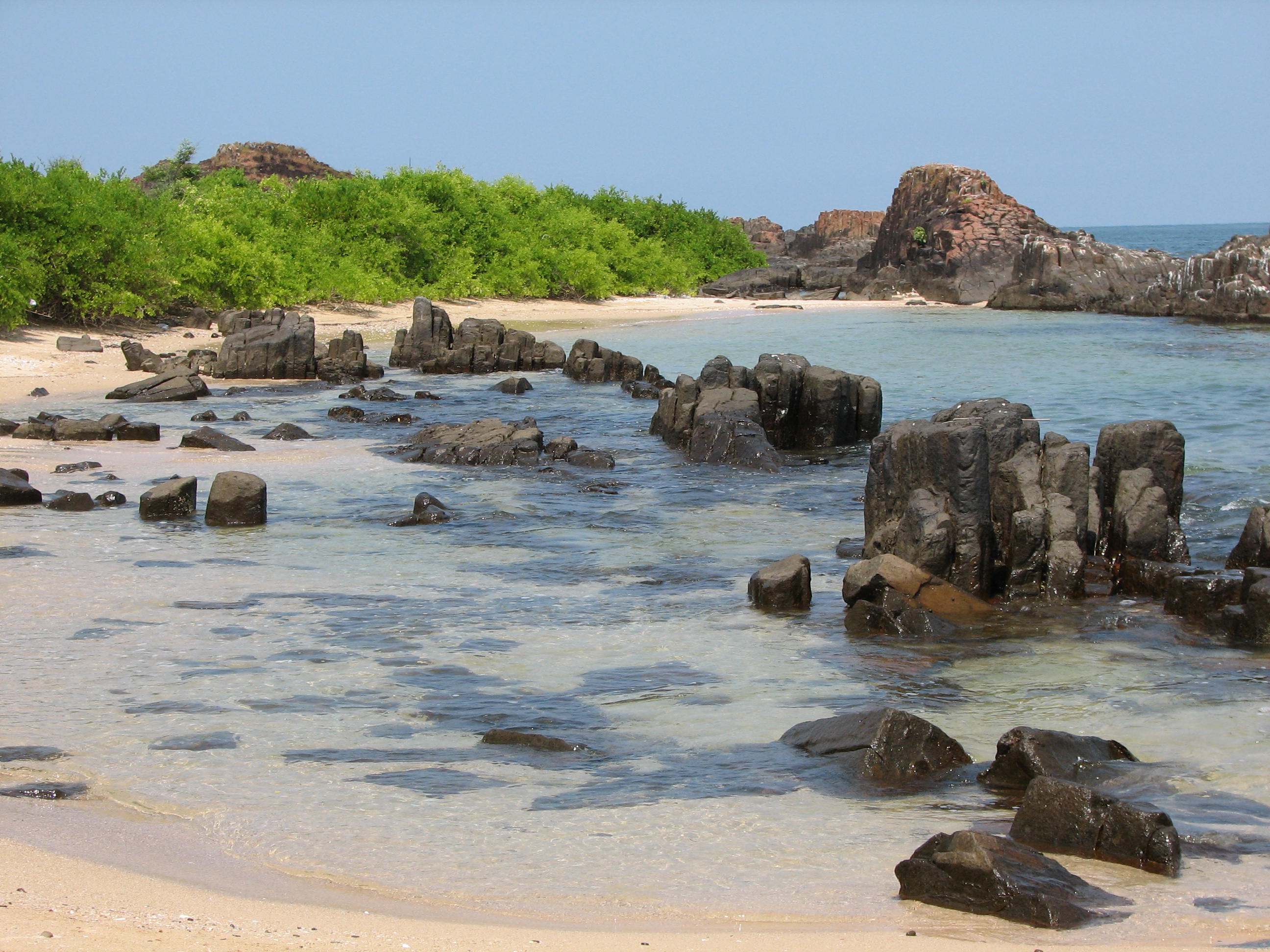
Rocks in the beach

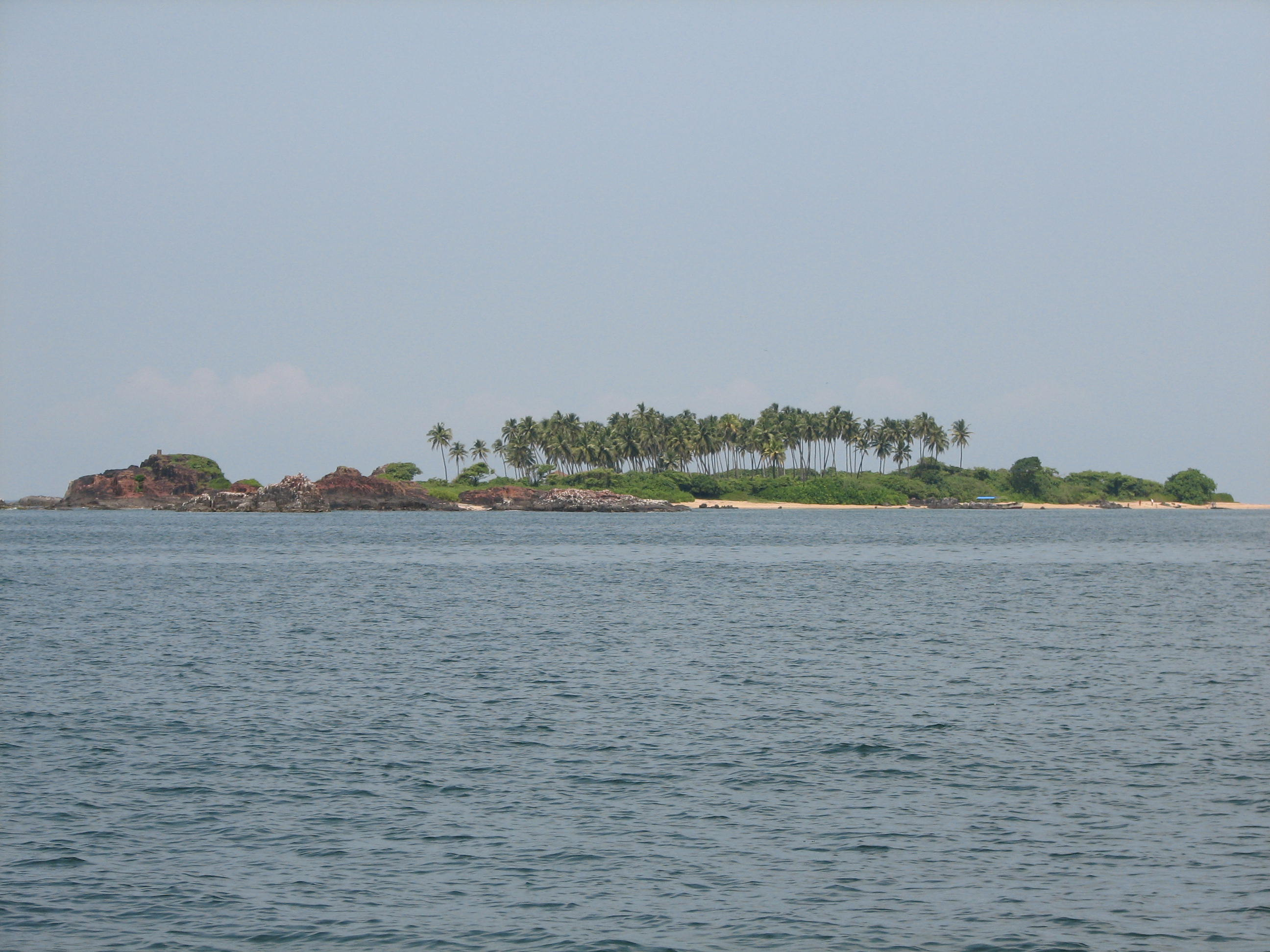
View of the islands

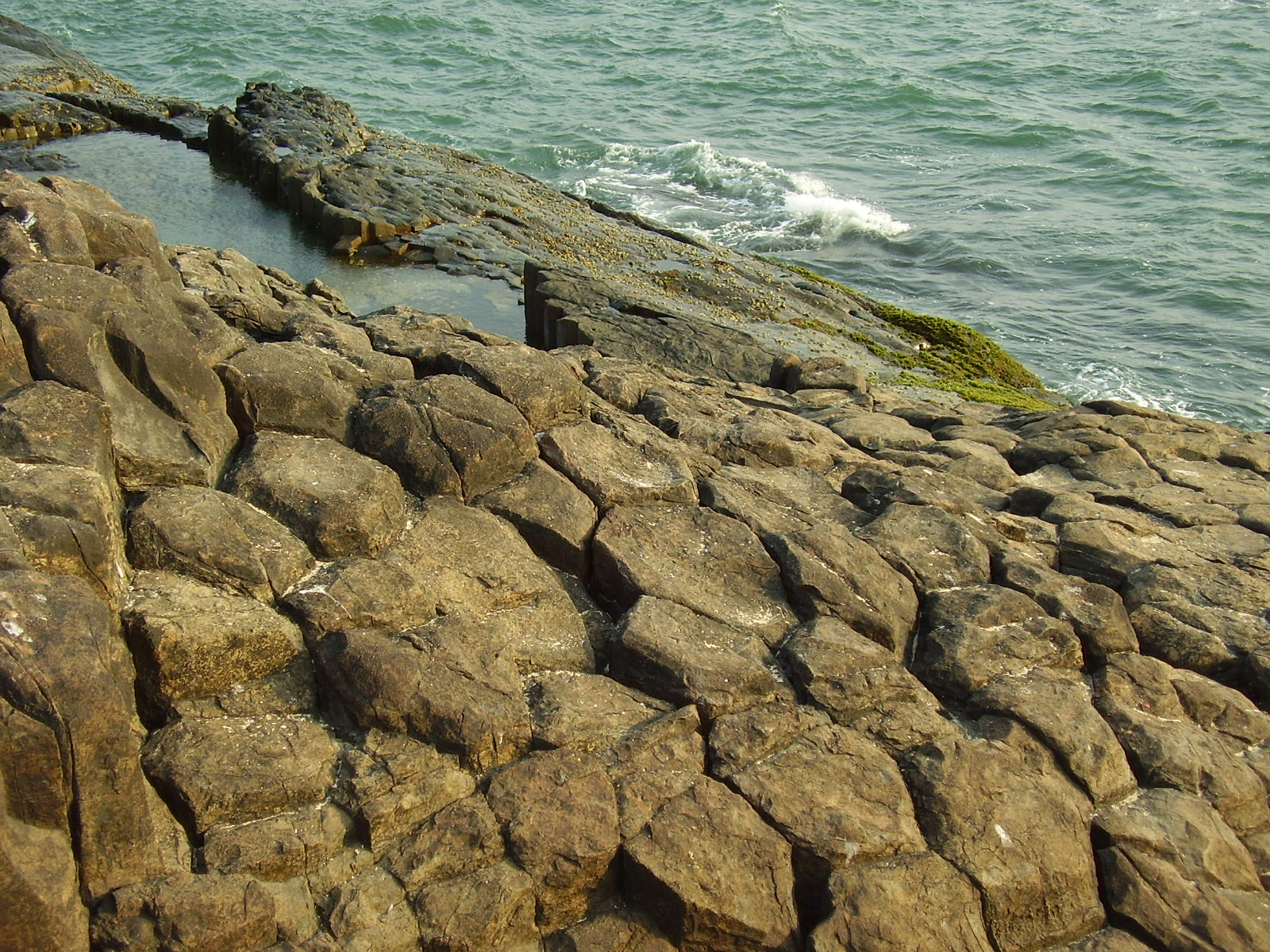
Rocky coast

== See also ==
- List of places with columnar jointed volcanics
- Adam's Bridge – Chain of shoals between India and Sri Lanka
- Devils Postpile National Monument – National monument in California, United States
- Flores Island (Azores) – Island of Portugal
- Fingal's Cave – Sea cave in Scotland
- Giant's Causeway – Interlocking basalt columns in Northern Ireland
