= P. Gururaja Bhat =

Indian historian

Paduru Gururaja Bhat
- Paduru Gururaja Bhat
- Born: 1924; Paduru, Udupi district, Karnataka
- Died: 1978 (aged 53–54)
- Occupations: Historian, academician, professor, author

Paduru Gururaja Bhat (1924 – 27 August 1978) was a teacher, historian and archaeologist of Tulu Nadu and of Barkur, the ancient capital of the Tulu kingdom.

== Career ==
Born in 1924 in the village of Paduru in Karnataka's Udupi district, Bhat graduated from the University of Madras in 1952. He received a master's degree in history from the Banaras Hindu University in 1956 and a PhD from the University of Mysore in 1968. His thesis was entitled A Political and Cultural History of Tulu-nadu from the earliest times up to AD 1600.

Bhat taught at the Mahatma Gandhi Memorial College in Udupi, and was the founder-principal of Milagres College, Kallianpur, from 1967 to 1976.

== Books ==
- Tulunadu
- Antiquities of South Kanara (1969), Prabhakara Press.
- Tulunadina Nagamandala (1977), Kannada language.
- Studies in Tuluva history and culture: From the pre-historic times upto [sic] the modern (1975).
- Tulunadina Itihasadalli Sthanikaru - Devesthana Adaliteya Ithihasika Adhyayana (written in Kannada)/ Sthanikas in the History of Tulunadu - A Historical study on temple management, 1966
- Dakshina Kannadada Tuluvaru Tulwa Samskritiyu (IBH Prakashana, Bangalore, 1972) –Kannada
- Udupiya Itihasa (IBH Prakashana, Bangalore, 1972) –Kannada
- Barakuru (IBH Prakasana, Bangalore, 1972) –Kannada
- Mandartiya Samikshe (Published by the Executive officer of the Durga-Parameshvari Temple, Mandarti, 1971) – Kannada language
- Ambalpadiya Ithihasa (Published by the Janardhana-Mahakali Temple, Ambalapadi, Udupi, 1967) –Kannada
- Kadri Sri-Manjunatha Devalaya (Published by the Manager, Sri Manjunatha Temple, Kadri, Mangalore, 1974) –Kannada

Another book, Temples of Dakshina Kannada, was started by P Gururaj Bhat, but was suspended for a long time after his death. The project was later completed by Prof. Muralidhara Upadhya and Dr. P N Narasimhamurthy.
