= Kukkikatte =

Kukkikatte Kukkuthakatte
- suburb in udupi
- Location in Karnataka, India Kukkikatte (India)
- Coordinates: 13°19′19″N 74°46′13″E
- Country: India
- State: Karnataka
- District: Udupi

Languages
  - Official: Tulu
- Time zone: UTC+5:30 (IST)
- Postal code: 576101

Kukkikatte is a place located about 3 km from the city of Udupi in the state of Karnataka, India. It is a suburb of the Udupi City. "Kukkuthakatte" is a Tulu word which means a place with mangoes in abundance. Tulu is very common there
