= Nandicoor =

- village
- Location in Karnataka, India Nandicoor (India)
- Coordinates: 13.146839°N 74.800517°E
- Country: India
- State: Karnataka
- District: Udupi

Government
  - Body: Gram panchayat

Languages
  - Official: Tulu, Kannada
- Time zone: UTC+5:30 (IST)
- PIN: 574111
- Telephone code: 0820
- ISO 3166 code: IN-KA
- Vehicle registration: KA-20
- Nearest city: Udupi
- Lok Sabha constituency: Udupi
- Vidhan Sabha constituency: Kaup
- Website: karnataka.gov.in

Nandicoor (variously Nandikur or Nandikoor) is a village in Udupi district of Karnataka state in India. The Nandicoor village lies amidst paddy fields, coconut gardens and evergreen forests. Rare flora and fauna are found in these forests. This scenery has been lost due to setting up of coal based thermal electric power generating station. Nandikoor railway station has been constructed for unloading of wagons which bring coal to a thermal electricity plant. Padubidri is nearest town to this village.

Nandikoor railway station is east of Shri Durga Parameshwari temple at Nandikur.
