= Yenagudde =

- city
- Location in Karnataka, India
- Coordinates: 13.29°N 74.75°E
- Country: India
- State: Karnataka
- District: Udupi

Population (2001)
  - Total: 4,537

Languages
  - Official: Kannada
- Time zone: UTC+5:30 (IST)

Yenagudde is a census town in Udupi district in the Indian state of Karnataka.

== Demographics ==
As of 2001 India census, Yenagudde had a population of 4537. Males constitute 47% of the population and females 53%. Yenagudde has an average literacy rate of 81%, higher than the national average of 59.5%: male literacy is 85%, and female literacy is 76%. In Yenagudde, 9% of the population is under 6 years of age.
