= Kapu, Udupi =

Kaup, Karnataka
- Town
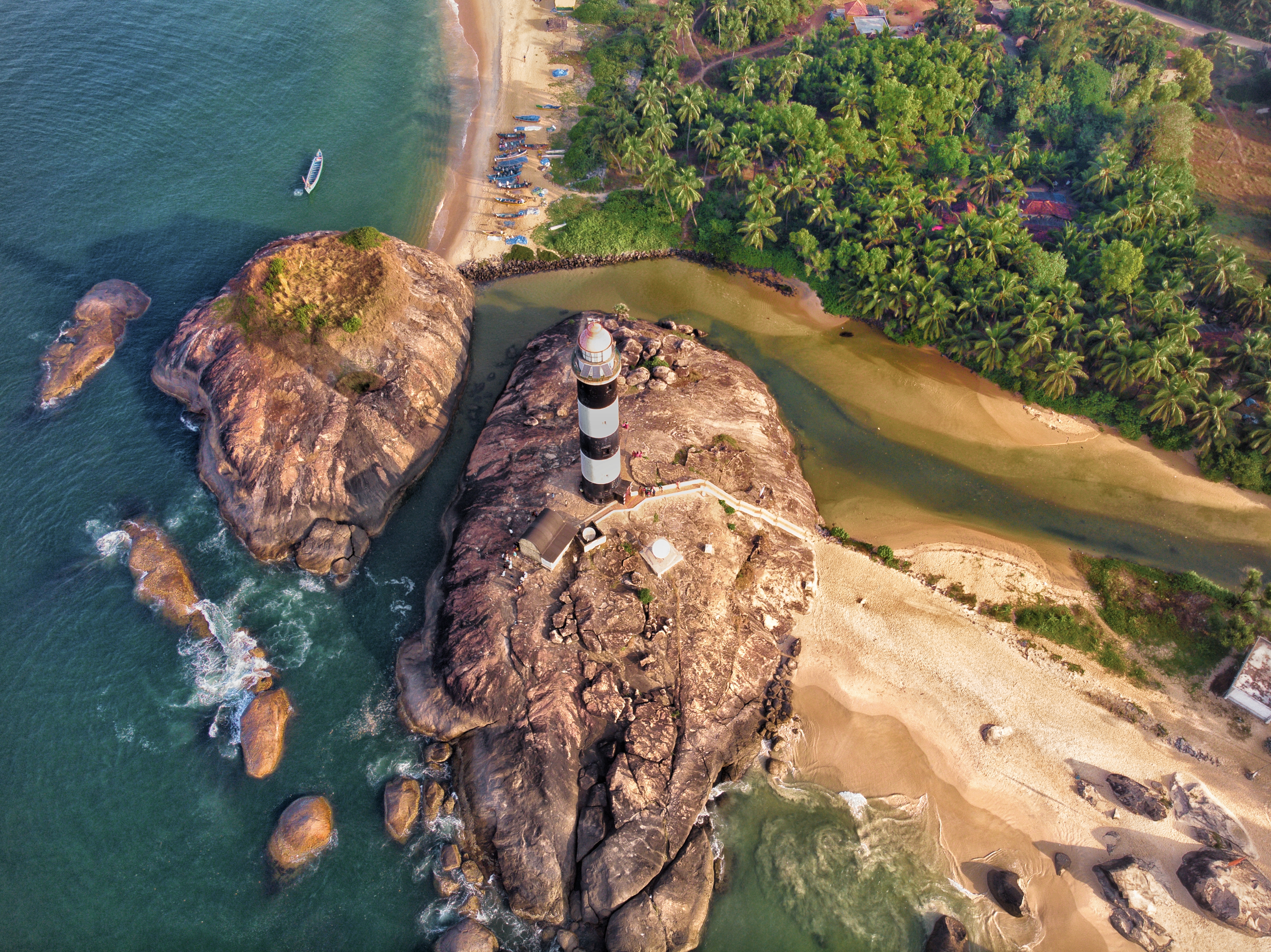
- Aerial view of Kaup(Kapu) Beach Lighthouse

- Location in Karnataka, India Kaup, Karnataka (India)
- Coordinates: 13.2238°N 74.7367°E
- Country: India
- State: Karnataka
- District: Udupi District

Population
  - Total: 6,850

Languages
  - Administrative: Kannada
  - Regional: Tulu, Konkani, Kannada
- Time zone: UTC+5:30 (IST)
- PIN: 574106
- Telephone code: 0820
- ISO 3166 code: IN-KA
- Vehicle registration: KA-20
- Website: www.kauptown.mrc.gov.in

Kapu or Kaup is a town in the Udupi district of Karnataka, India. It is situated on National Highway 66, approximately 13 km south of Udupi and 40 km north of Mangalore. The town is known for its historic lighthouse, fort, and the three Mariamman shrines. In 2018, the Government of Karnataka officially declared Kapu a taluk.

== History ==
The Kapu Fort was constructed in 1743 by Basappa Nayaka of the Keladi dynasty. The fort was later occupied and reinforced by Tipu Sultan during the late 18th century to serve as a coastal battery.

During the colonial period, the region fell under British administration. In the early 20th century, the coastal infrastructure was modernized with the construction of the lighthouse to assist maritime navigation along the Arabian Sea. Administratively, Kapu remained part of the Udupi taluk until it was granted independent taluk status in February 2018.

== Kapu lighthouse ==
The Kapu lighthouse was built in 1901 by the British Raj, on the shores of the Arabian Sea close to Kaup Beach. It is 27.12 meters tall.

== Religious places ==
Sri Hale Mariamma Temple, Hosa Marigudi Temple, Shri Laxmi Janardhana Temple, Sri Venkataramana Temple (Konkani Mutt), Sacred Heart Church Yermal (Gochi/Gounchi konkani) and Juma Masjid-Polipu.

== Notable people ==
- Sandeep Shetty – Actor

== Gallery ==
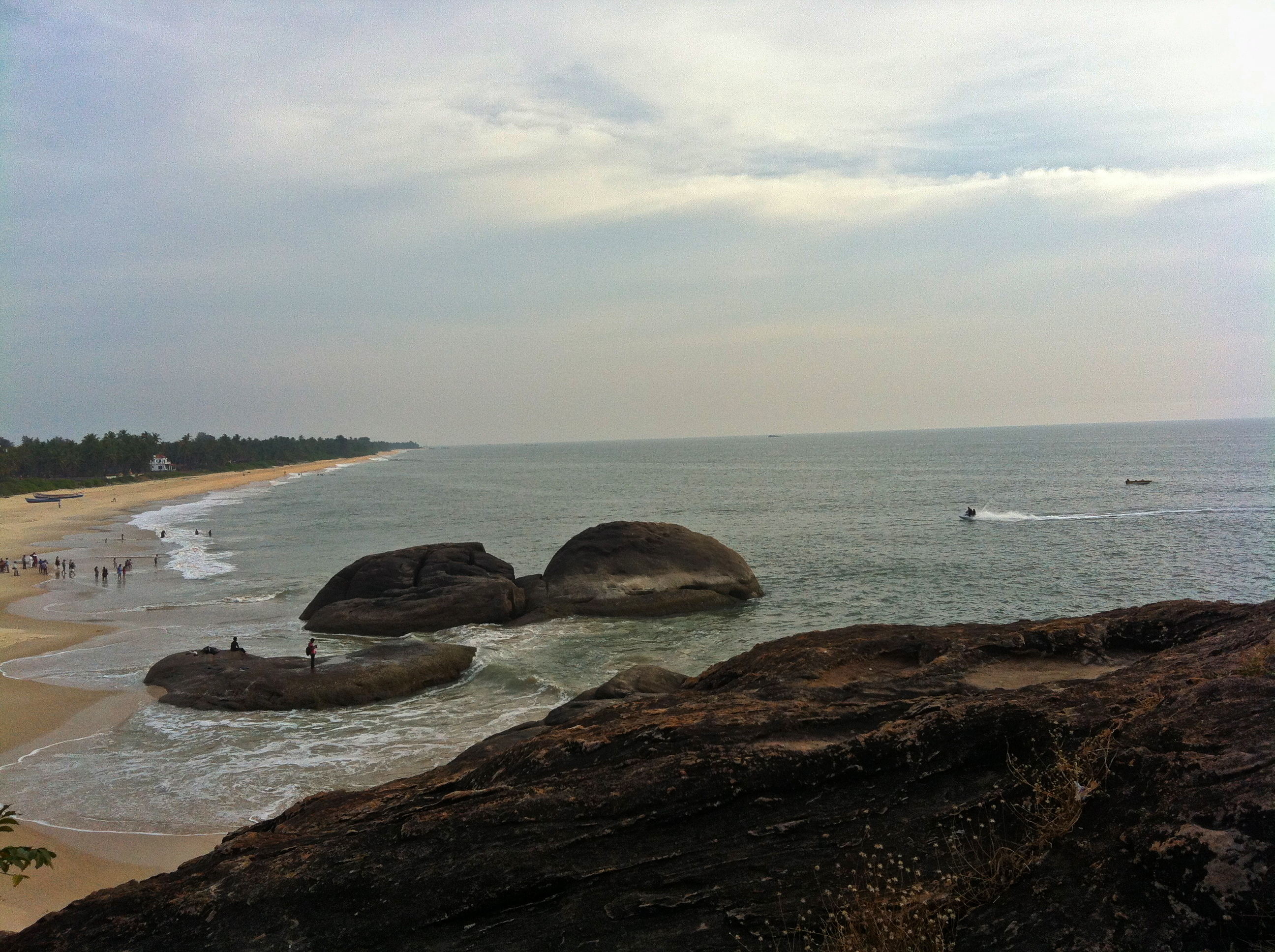
Kaup beach

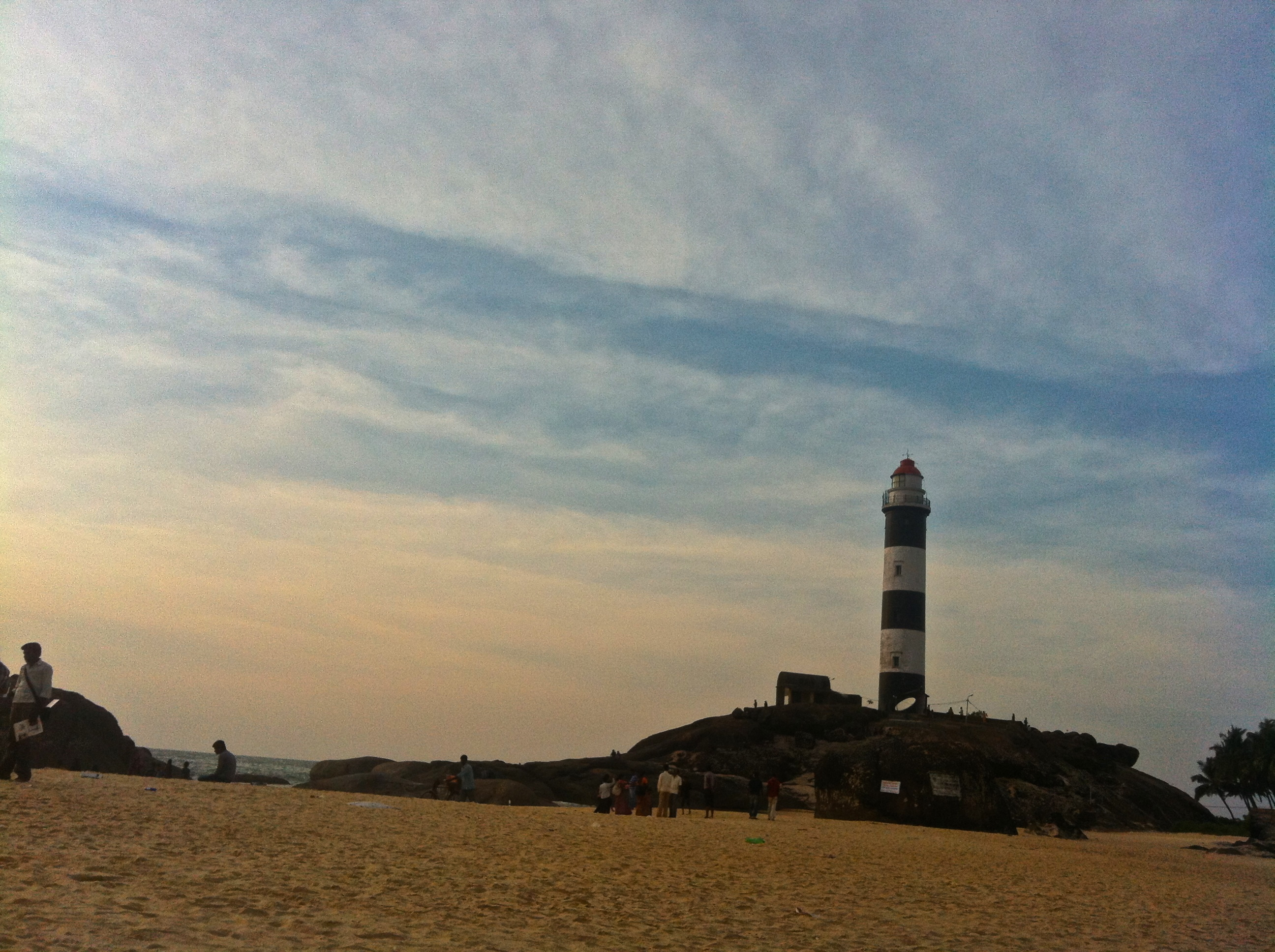
Evening shot of Lighthouse of Kapu beach

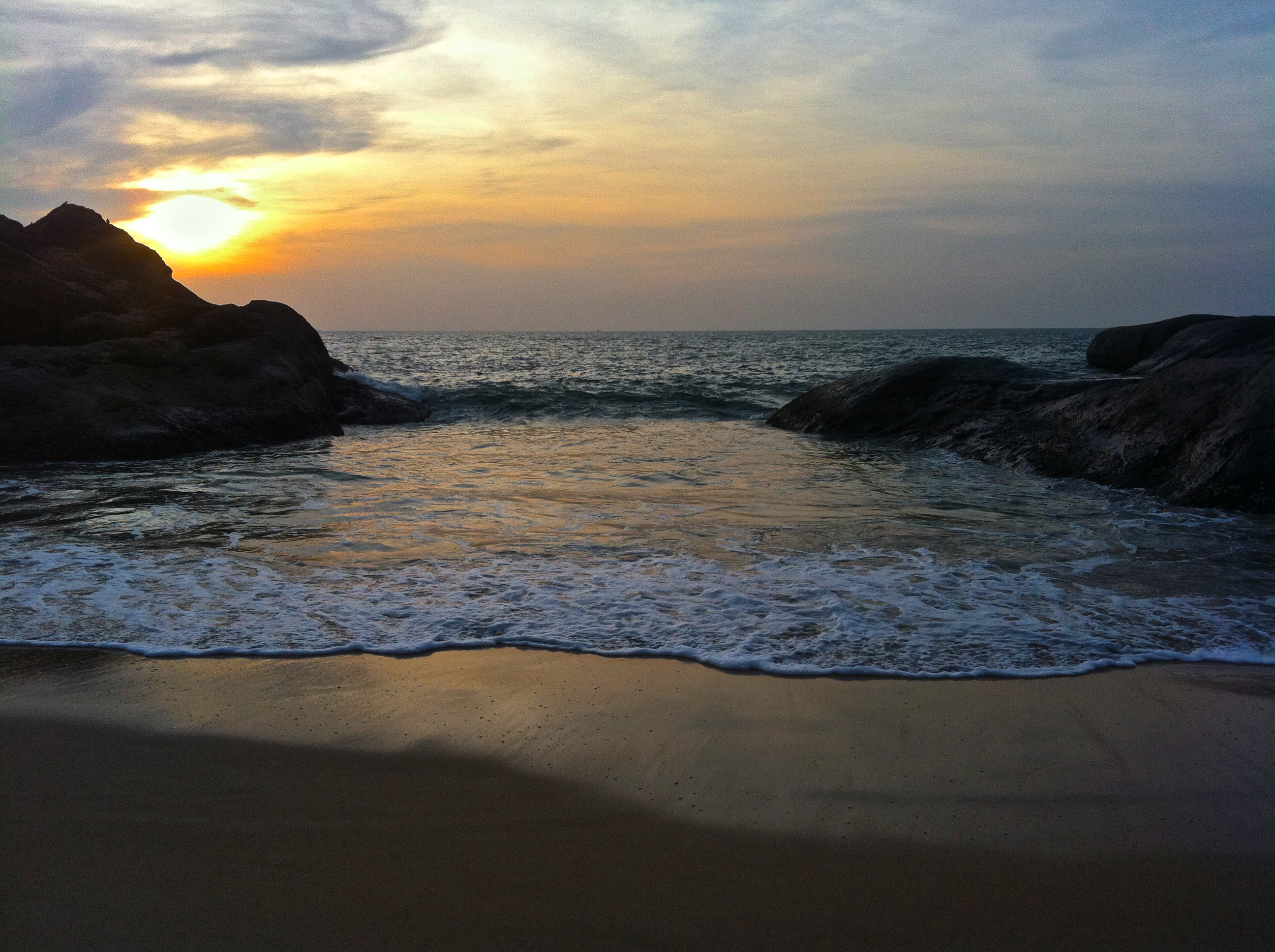
Kaup beach

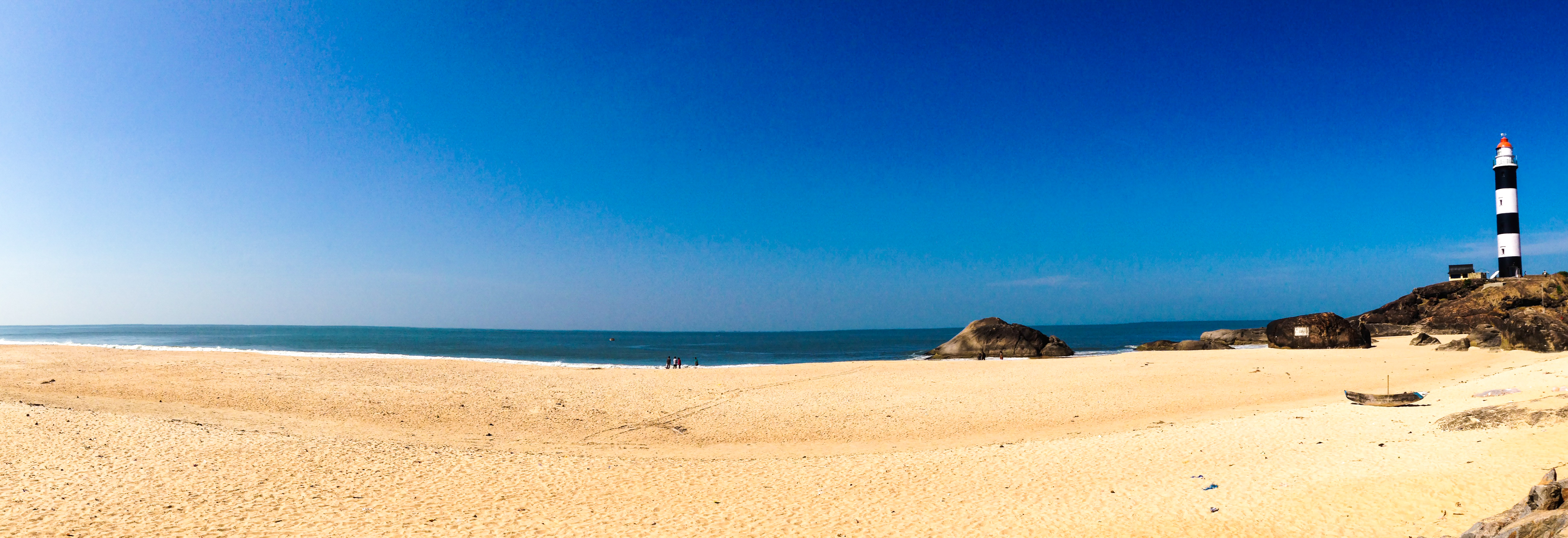
Kapu Beach panoramic view

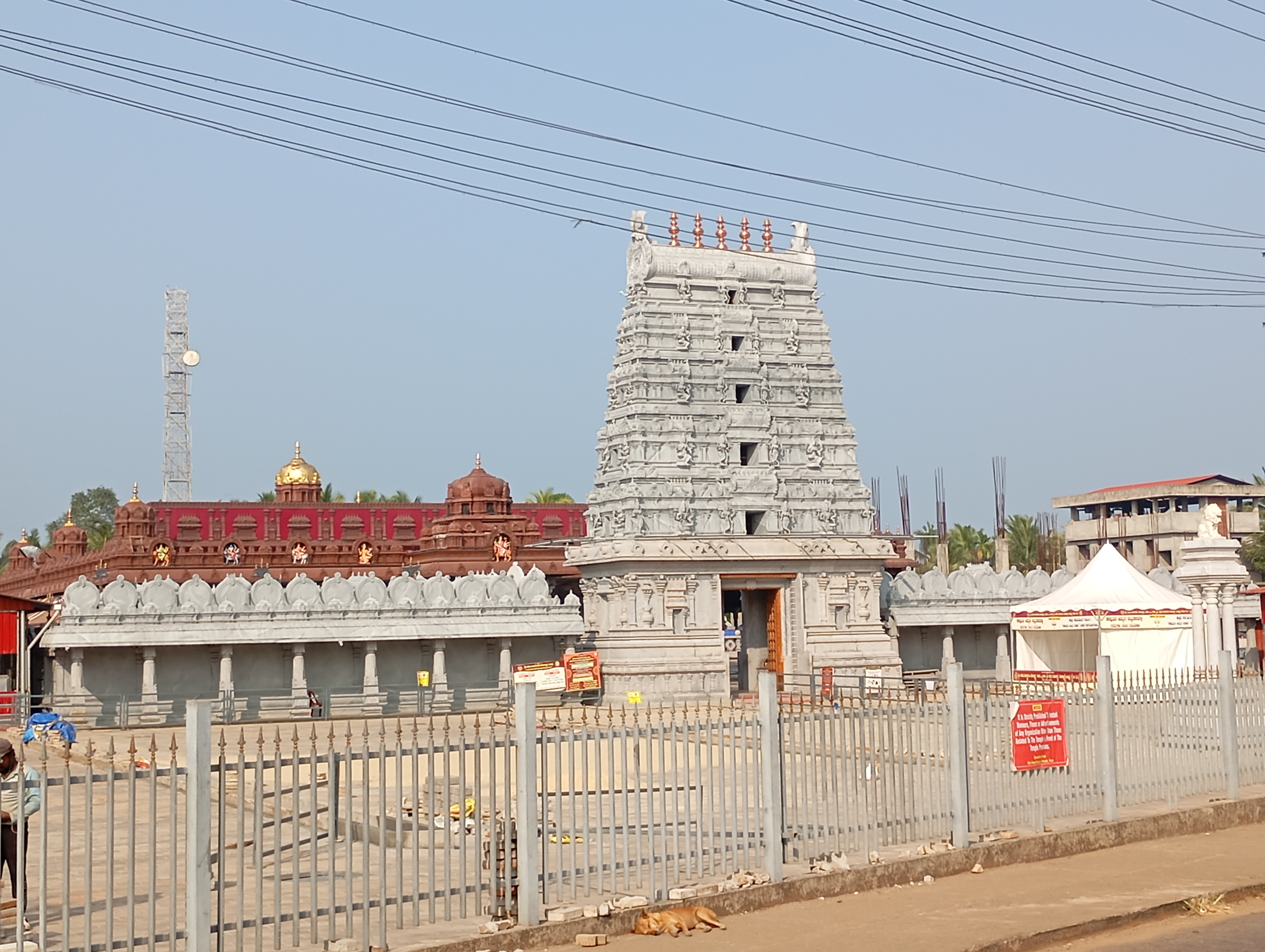
Hosa Marigudi Temple, Kapu

NH 66 at Kapu
