= Malpe =

- Suburb
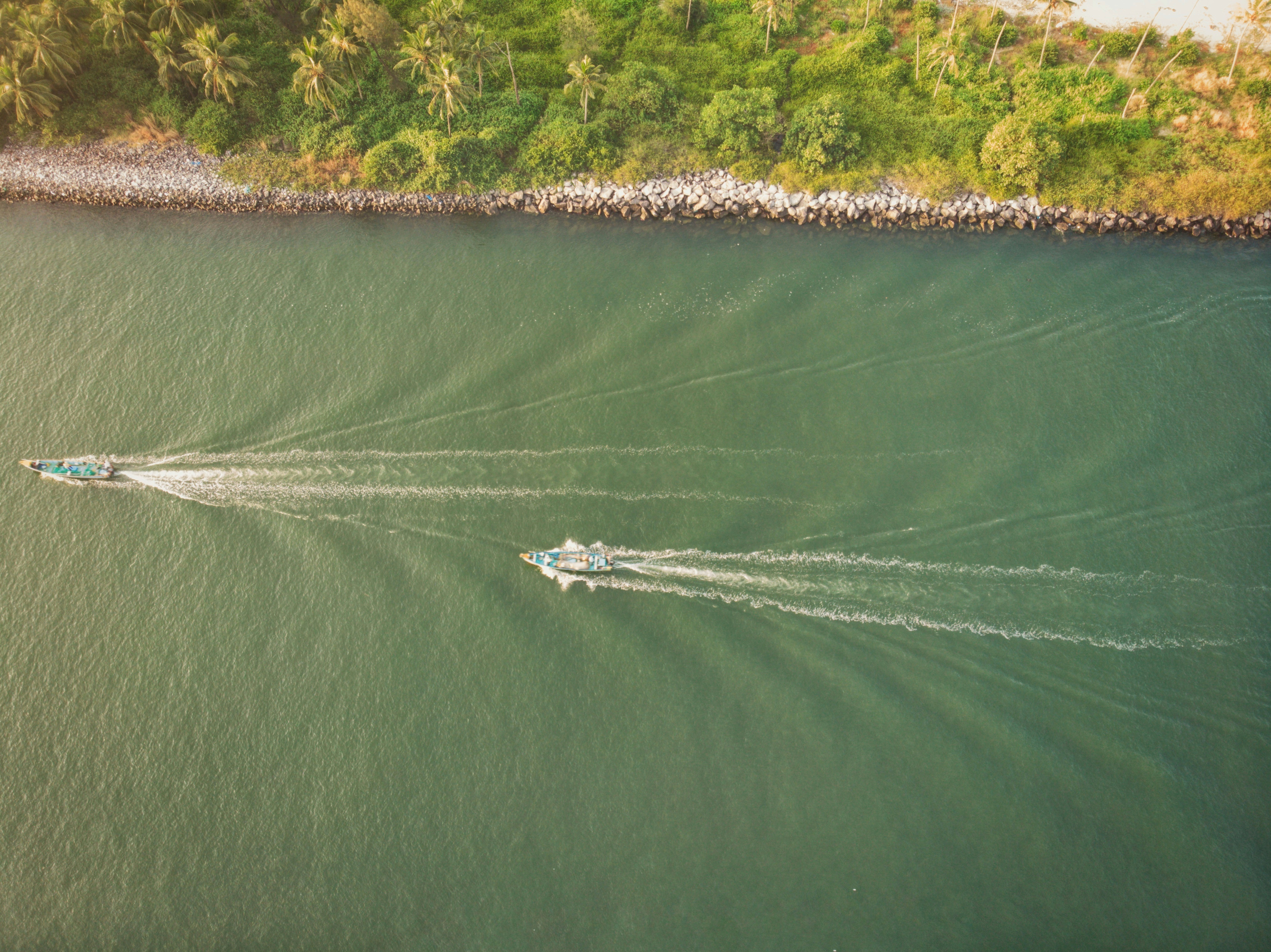
- Aerial view of Malpe beach
- Nickname: Malapu
- Location in Karnataka, India
- Coordinates: 13.3795°N 74.6730°E
- Country: India
- State: Karnataka
- District: Udupi
- City: Udupi

Languages
  - Official: Kannada
- Time zone: UTC+5:30 (IST)
- PIN: 576 108
- ISO 3166 code: IN-KA
- Vehicle registration: KA 20
- Website: karnataka.gov.in

Malpe is a natural port in the Udupi District in Karnataka, India. Located at the mouth of the Malpe River about six kilometers to the west of Udupi, it is an important port and a major fishing harbor on the Karnataka coast. The town of Malpe is associated largely with settlements of the Mogaveera fisherman community. Malpe is a hub of Mogaveera, Billava Christian and Muslim population.

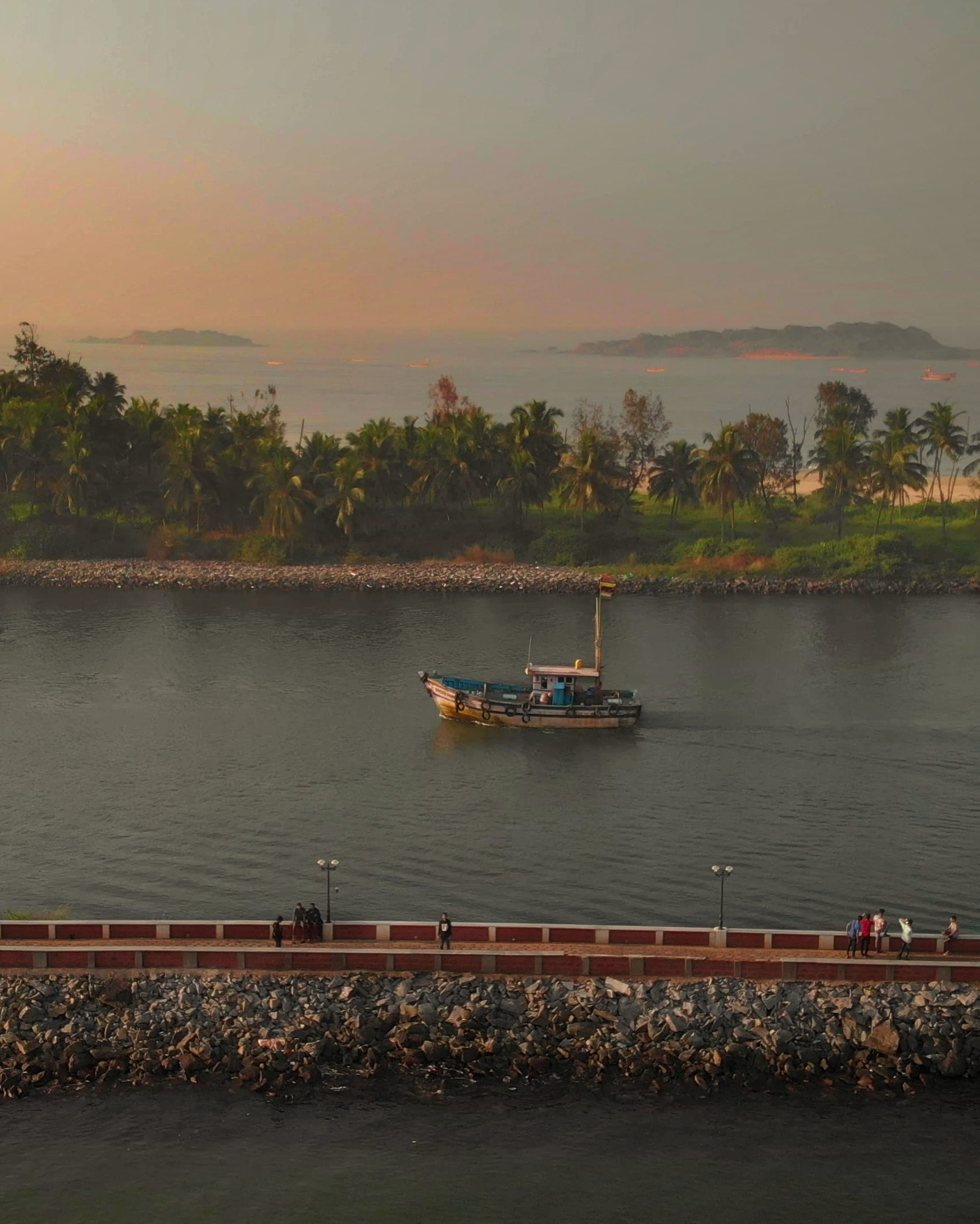
Malpe Sea walk

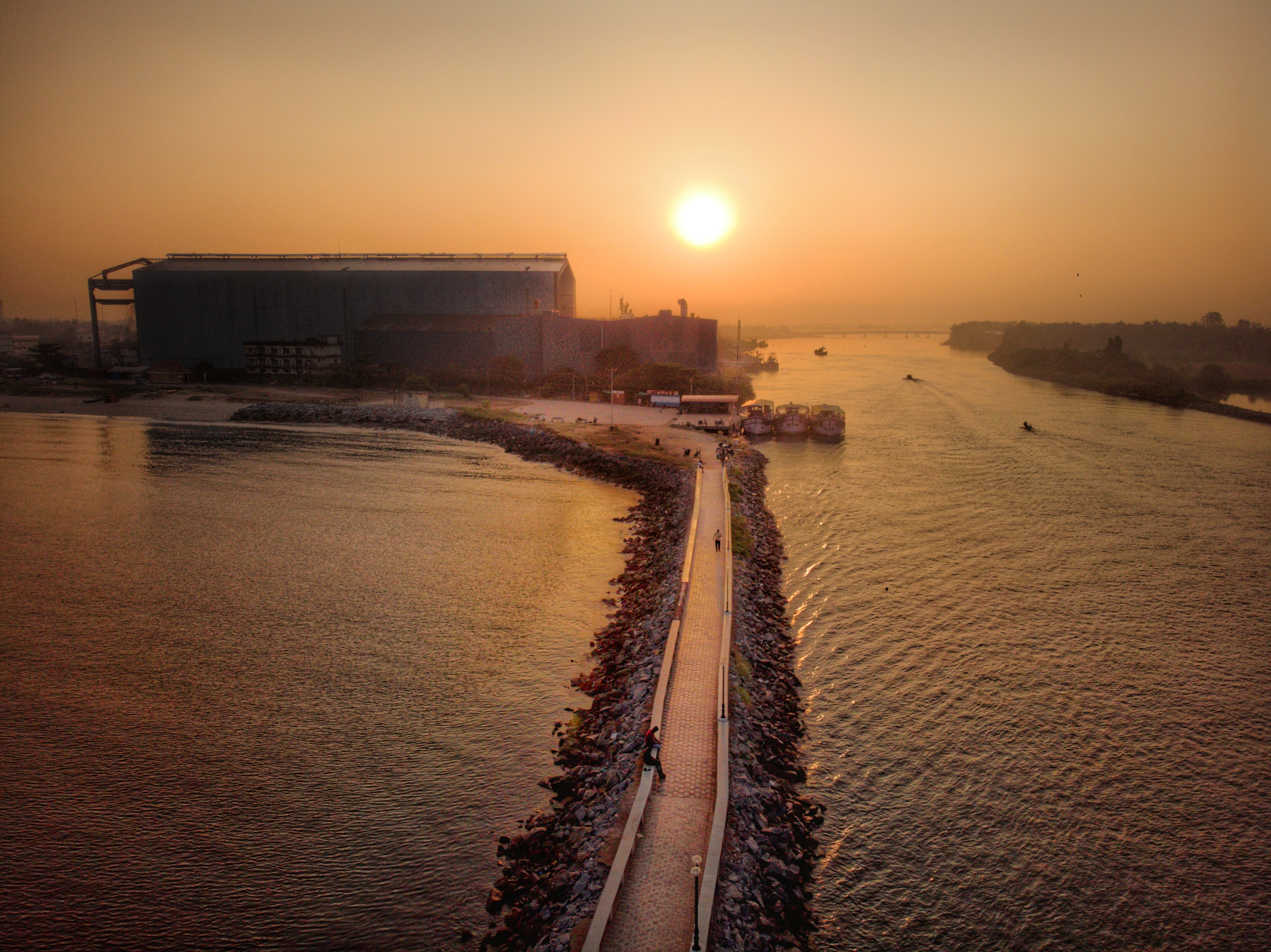
Sunset at Malpe Beach

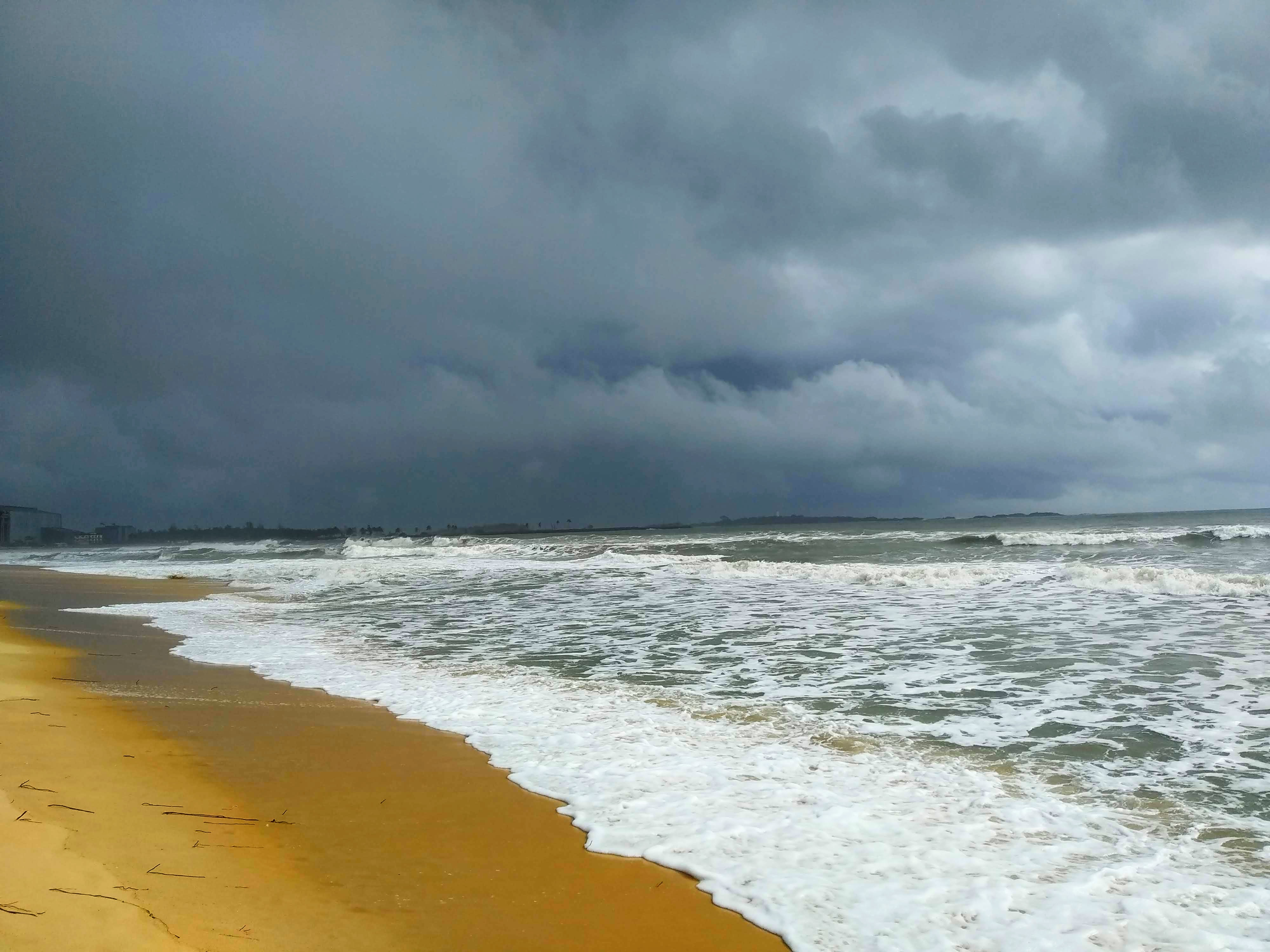
View of Malpe Beach

== History ==
Malpe is an ancient sea port and harbour, where Karnataka and the western world traded. Malpe has been mentioned as early as second century C.E. by the Greek geographer Ptolemy. The location is also mentioned in an ancient Greek farce found written on papyri from the second century or earlier, published in modern times in The Oxyrhynchus Papyri Part III.

== Industry ==
The major industry in Malpe is fisheries. Malpe is also known as the largest fishing harbour in the Udupi District. A considerable number of the area is employed directly and indirectly by the fishing industries.

== Malpe Beach and coastal marine life ==
Malpe Beach is known as a destination for holidays and picnics. The Beach has a Sea Walkway with a view of St. Mary's Island and Bhadargad Island, as well as the rest of the beach. It also contains a statue of a fishing family, including a fisherman, fisherwoman, and child, created by the artist Purshotham Adve. Visitors can head to Udupi to visit Sri Krishna Temple (5 km) or Kapu beach and lighthouse (20 km from Malpe) to spend the rest of the day. Mangaluru city (60 km) offers more beaches, temples and attractions for an extended weekend trip. The Beach also has 24/7 wifi connection, available for free for 30 minutes. There are other tourist attractions close to Malpe Beach, such as Ulall Beach, St. Mary's Island, Daria-Bahadurgad Fort, and Balarama and Ananteshwara Temples.

The Major Institutions in India involved in the management, monitoring and research on Coral reefs are the Ministry of Earth Sciences, the Zoological Survey of India, Central Marine Fisheries Research Institute, Madurai Kamaraj University, Annamalai University, National Centre for Earth Science Studies, National Institute of Ocean Technology, National Institute of Oceanography, India etc.

Gaveshani Bank, a calcareous sand bank and a platform type living corals reef of 38 m to 60 m depth, is 100 km offshore at latitude 13° 24'N and longitude 73° 45'E and Malpe is nearest port. Reef originated in pleistocene when sea level was low, and during coral reef continued to rise with the rise in sea level during holocene which resulted in creation of this bank.

== Malpe Sea Walk ==
On 27 January 2018, A sea walk way was commissioned and inaugurated by Minister for Fisheries, Youth Empowerment and Sports, Pramod Madhwaraj. Located next to the Tourist Jetty in Malpe, where the tourists board boats to visit St. Mary's Island, The sea walkway point gives a view of the entire stretch of Malpe Beach, St. Mary's Island and the Bhadargad Island.

This project took three months to complete and costed ₹ 53.5 lakh.

In October 2020, The Malpe Development Committee, allocated an additional budget of ₹ 2 crore for facelift of Malpe Sea Walk and addition of artefacts at the beach. A 15-feet cement statue of Jatayu is one among the few additions under this project.
