= Tonse East =

Kuntkani
- Census town
- Country: India
- State: Karnataka
- District: Uttara Kannada
- Talukas: Ankola

Government
  - Body: Gram panchayat

Population (2001)
  - Total: 7,497

Languages
  - Official: Kannada
- Time zone: UTC+5:30 (IST)
- ISO 3166 code: IN-KA
- Vehicle registration: KA
- Website: karnataka.gov.in

Kuntkani is a census town in the southern state of Karnataka, India. It is located in the Ankola taluk of Uttara Kannada district in Karnataka.

== Demographics ==
As of the 2011 Census of India, Kuntkani had a population of 7,911 with 3,758 males and 4,153 females.
