= Udupi district =

- District of Karnataka
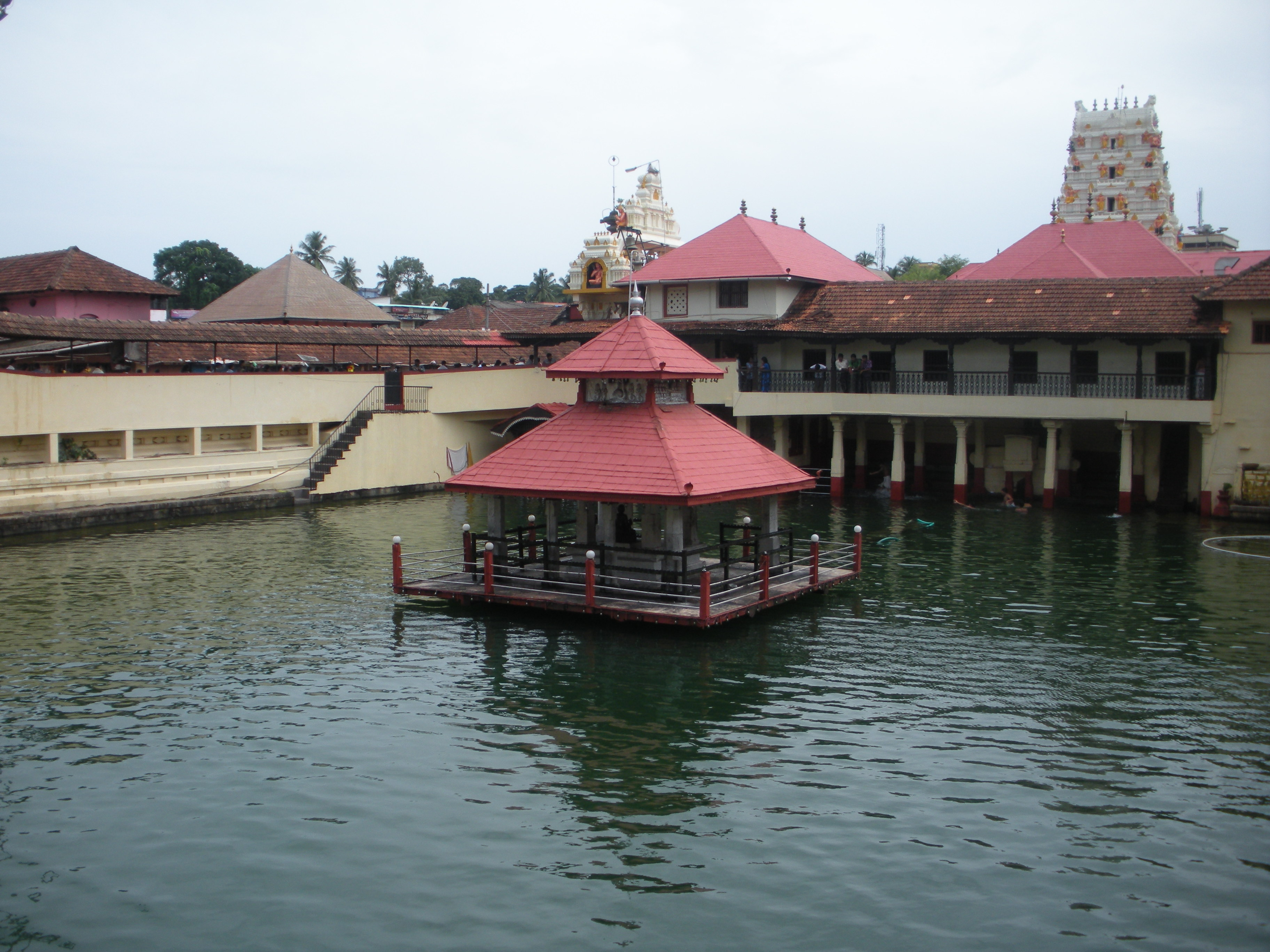
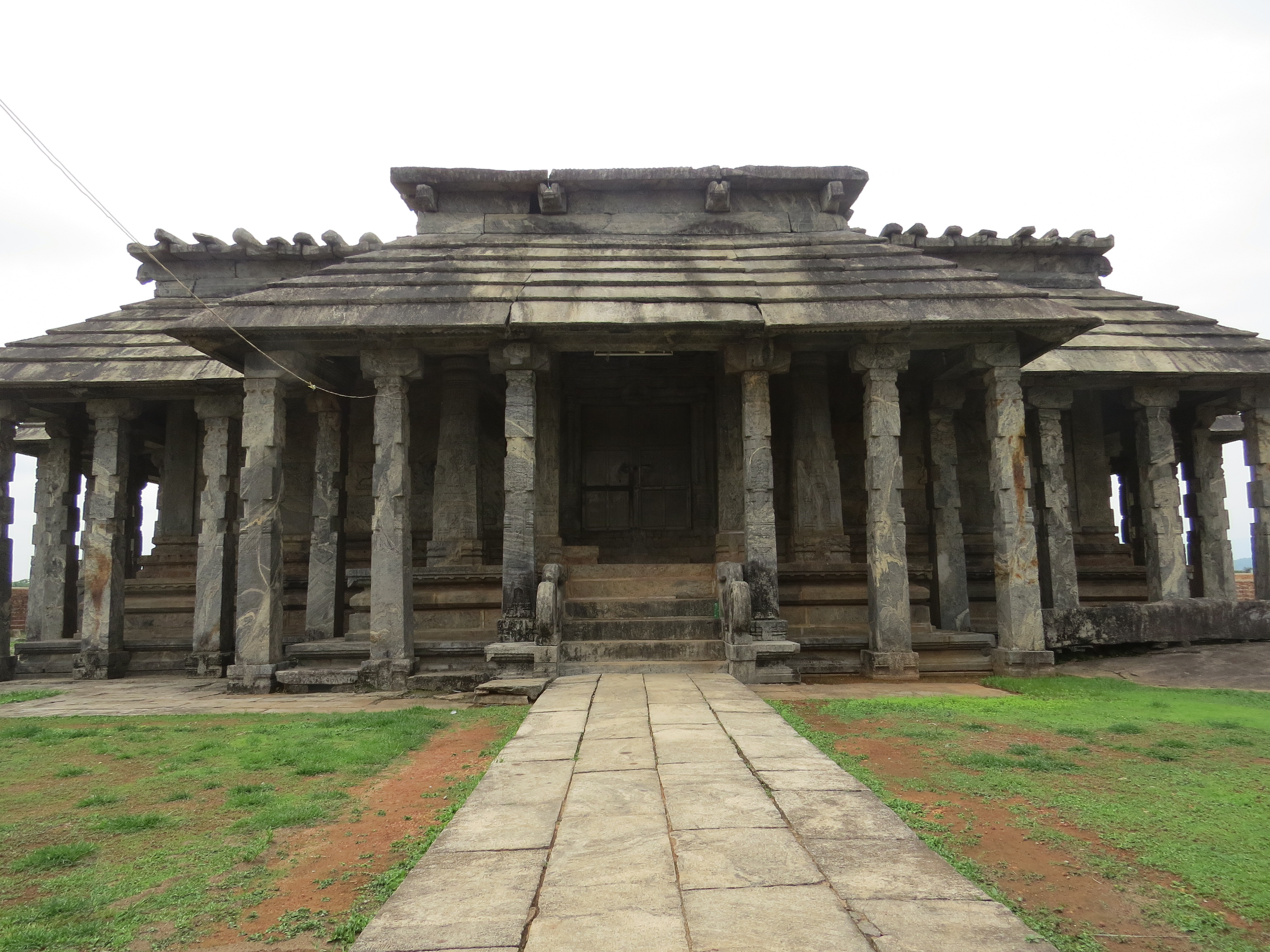
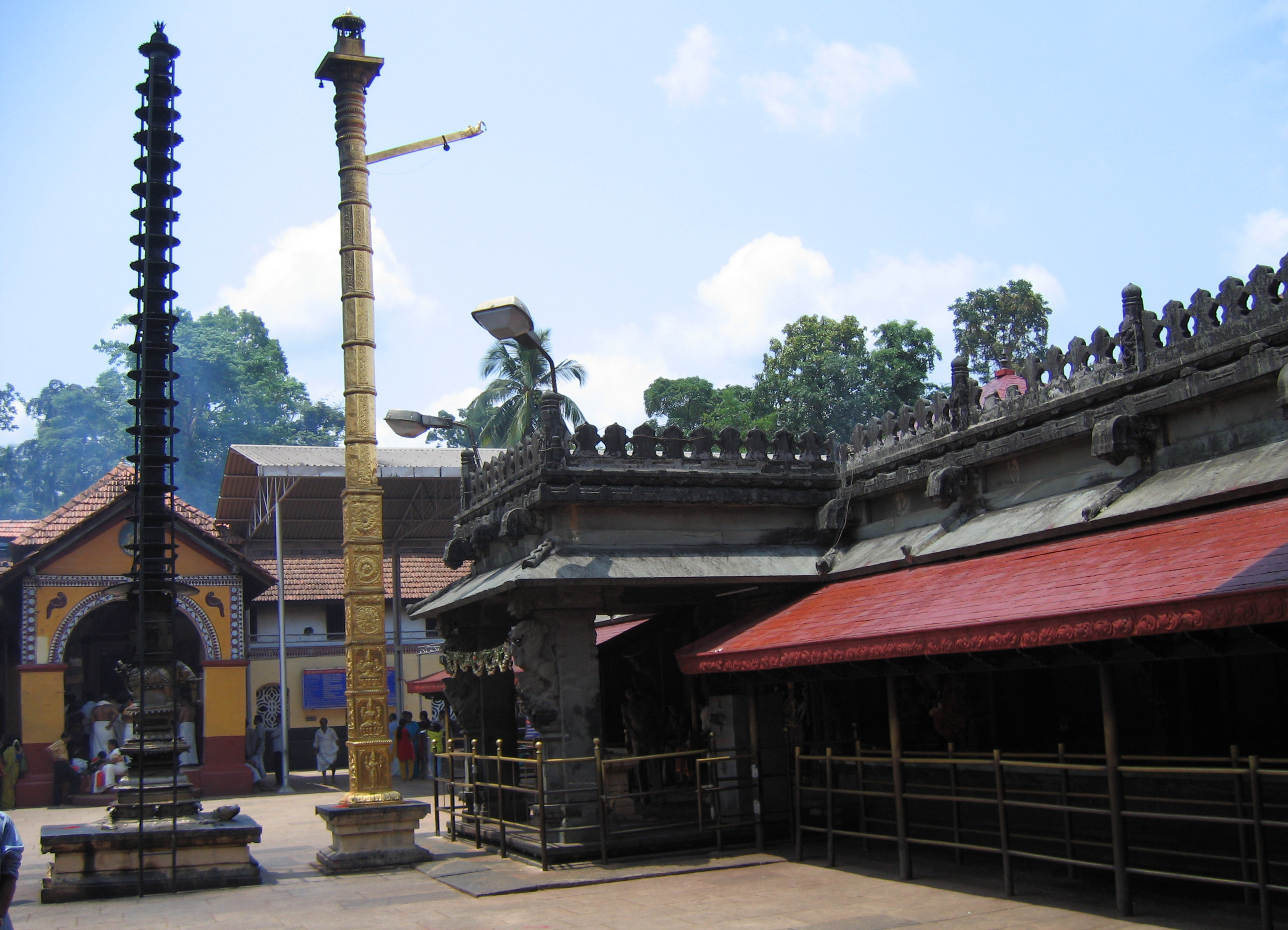
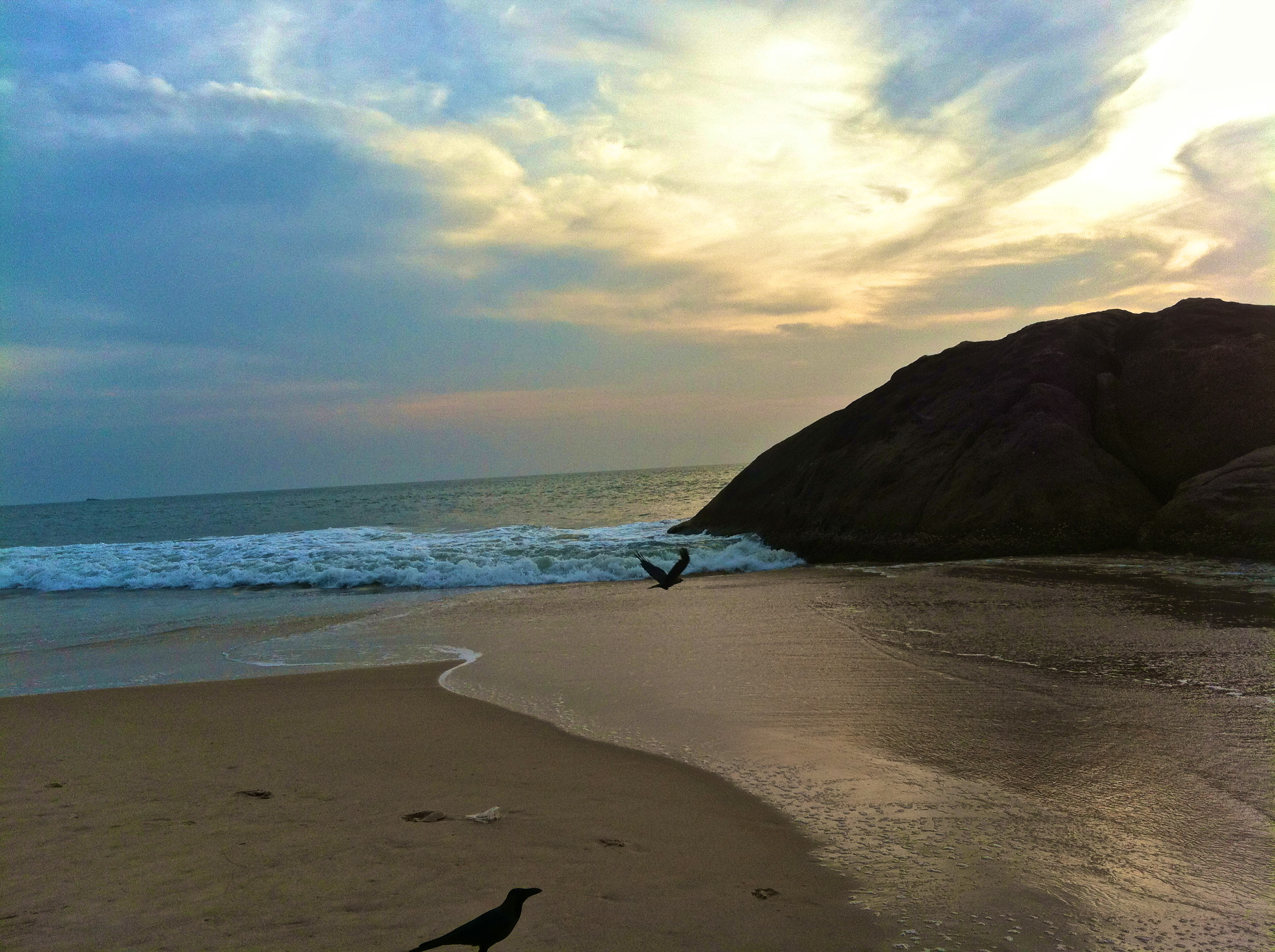
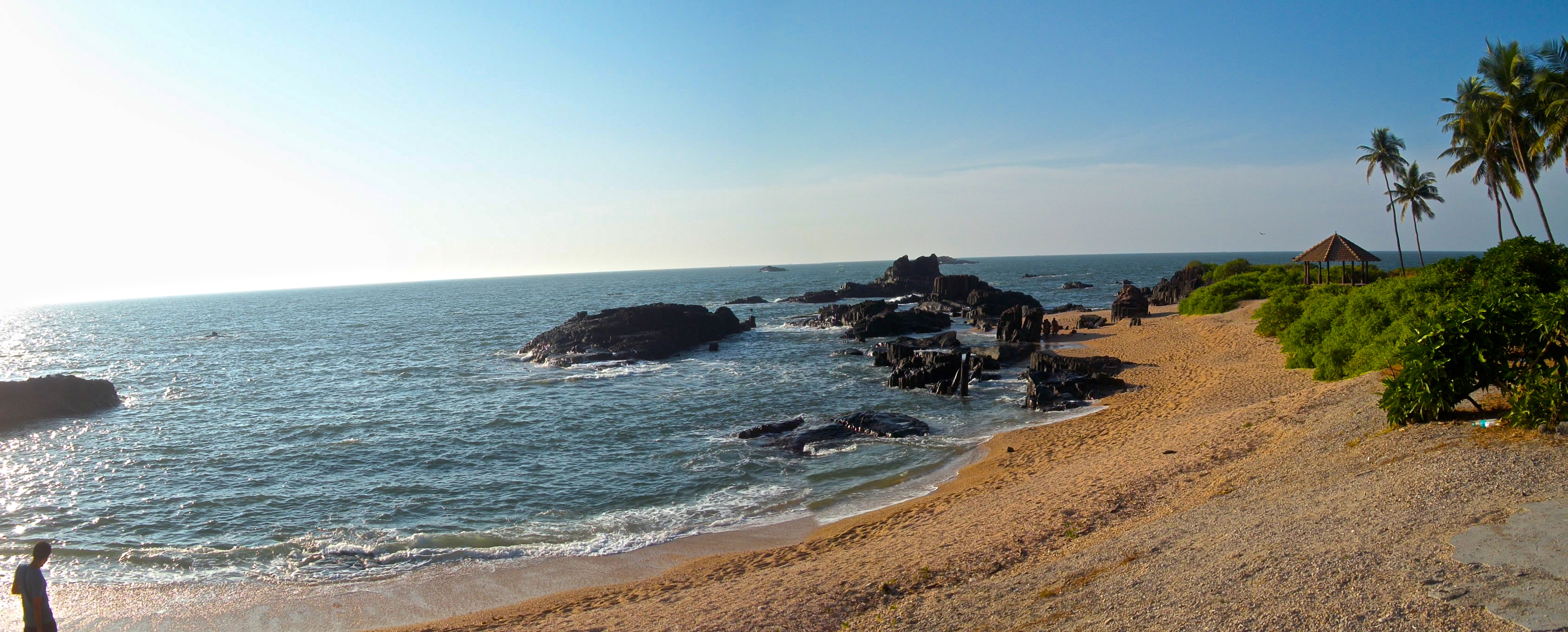
- Clockwise from top-left: Udupi Sri Krishna Matha, Chaturmukha Basadi in Karkala, Kapu Beach, St. Mary's Islands near Malpe, Mookambika Temple in Kollur
- Nickname: Temple City
- Location in Karnataka
- Coordinates: 13.35°N 74.75°E
- Country: India
- State: Karnataka
- Region: Coastal Karnataka
- Established: 25 August 1997
- Headquarters: Udupi
- Talukas: Udupi, Karkala, Kundapura, Hebri, Byndoor, Brahmavara & Kaup

Government
  - Type: District Administration
  - Body: Zilla panchayat
  - Deputy Commissioner and District Magistrate: Swaroopa T. K., IAS
  - Chief Executive Officer: Prateek Bayal (IAS)
  - Superintendent of Police: Hariram Shankar IPS
  - District Incharge Minister: Lakshmi Hebbalkar

Area
  - Total: 3,880 km^{2} (1,500 sq mi)

Population (2011)
  - Total: 1,177,361
  - Density: 303/km^{2} (786/sq mi)

Languages
  - Official: Kannada,Tulu
  - Other Regional Languages: Kundapra bhashi, Konkani, Urdu, Beary,Malayalam
- Time zone: UTC+5:30 (IST)
- PIN: 576 101
- ISO 3166 code: IN-KA-UD
- Vehicle registration: KA-20
- Coastline: 98 kilometres (61 mi)
- Largest city: Udupi
- Sex ratio: 1094 ♂/♀
- Literacy: 86.24%
- Lok Sabha constituency: Udupi-Chikmagalur
- Precipitation: 4,302 millimetres (169.4 in)
- Website: udupi.nic.in

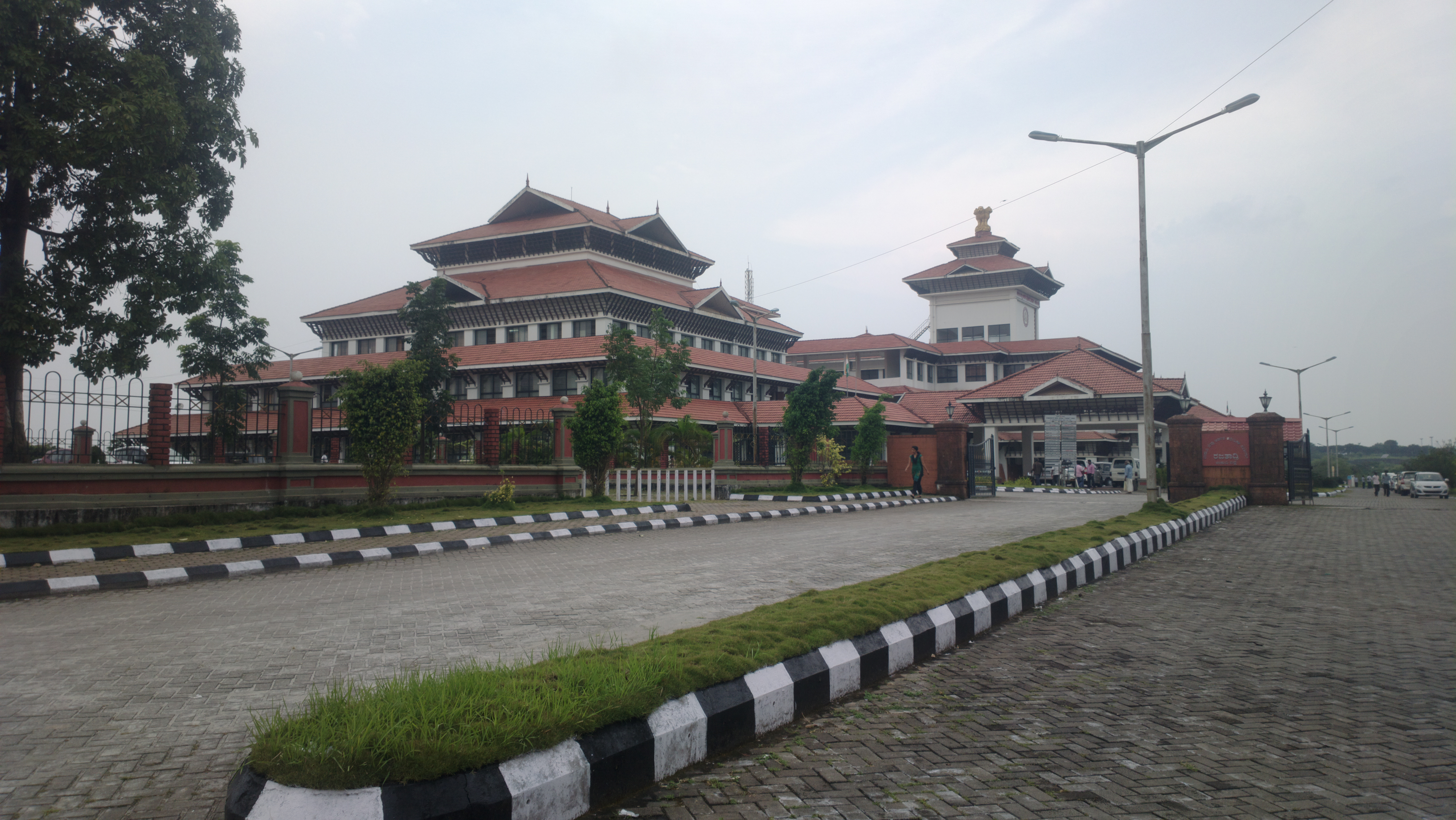
DC Office, Manipal

Udupi district (also Udipi (IPA: [uɖupi]) in Kannada or Odipu (IPA: [oɖipu]) in Tulu language) is an administrative subdivision in the Karnataka state of India, with the district headquarters in the city of Udupi. It is situated in the Canara old north Malabar coastal region. There are seven taluks, 233 villages and 21 towns in Udupi district. The three northern tehsils of Udupi, Kundapur and Karkala, were partitioned from Dakshina Kannada district (South Canara) to form Udupi district on 25 August 1997.

In February 2018, the district was split to into 3 more taluks, with Byndoor being carved out of Kundapur taluk and the Udupi taluk being split into three parts. Along with the initial Udupi taluk, Kapu, Brahmavar and Hebri were created.

Dinakar Babu and Sheela K Shetty of the Bharatiya Janata Party (BJP) are the current president (Sarpanch) and vice-president of the Udupi Zilla Panchayat, respectively, after the election held at the Zilla Panchayat on 27 April 2016.

== Location ==
Udupi district is surrounded by Uttara Kannada district in north, Dakshina Kannada district in southern direction. Shimoga district borders on north east side and Chikmagalur district on east. The Arabian Sea is west of Udupi district.

== Demographics ==
Historical population
Year	Pop.	±% p.a.
1901	413,076	—
1911	425,607	+0.30%
1921	437,908	+0.29%
1931	466,756	+0.64%
1941	507,316	+0.84%
1951	575,817	+1.27%
1961	648,798	+1.20%
1971	775,647	+1.80%
1981	948,696	+2.03%
1991	1,038,099	+0.90%
2001	1,112,243	+0.69%
2011	1,177,361	+0.57%

Religions in Udupi district (2011)
Religion	Percent
Hinduism	85.72%
Islam	8.22%
Christianity	5.59%
Other or not stated	0.47%

Languages of Udupi district (2011)
1. Kannada (42.7%)
2. Tulu (31.4%)
3. Konkani (12.2%)
4. Urdu (4.61%)
5. Marathi (2.83%)
6. Malayalam (2.13%)
7. Beary (2.01%)
8. Others (2.12%)

According to the 2011 census Udupi district has a population of 1,177,361. This gives it a ranking of 403rd in India (out of a total of 640). The district has a population density of 304 inhabitants per square kilometre (790/sq mi). Its population growth rate over the decade 2001-2011 was 5.9%.

Udupi district has 253,078 households, population of 1,177,361 of which 562,131 are males and 615,230 are females. The population of children between age 0-6 is 103,160 which is 8.76% of the total population. The sex-ratio of Udupi district is around 1094 compared to 973 which is average of Karnataka state. The literacy rate of Udupi district is 78.69% out of which 82.85% males are literate and 74.89% females are literate. The total area of Udupi is 3,582 km^{2} (1,383 sq mi) with a population density of 329 km^{2} (127 sq mi).

Udupi has a sex ratio of 1093 females for every 1000 males, and a literacy rate of 86.29%. 28.37% of the population lives in urban areas. Scheduled Castes and Scheduled Tribes make up 6.41% and 4.49% of the population respectively.

At the 2011 census, 42.70% of the population spoke Kannada, 31.44% Tulu, 12.16% Konkani, 4.61% Urdu, 2.83% Marathi, 2.13% Malayalam and 2.01% Beary as their first language.

In November 2026, district birth and death figures showed Udupi recording negative population growth over the previous five years, with deaths exceeding births in 2021 (12,983 births against 13,934 deaths), 2024 (11,047 against 12,269) and 2025 (11,142 against 12,509); enrolment in Class 1 in the district had fallen by more than 50 per cent over the same period.

== Climate ==
Udupi district has a tropical monsoon climate with hot, humid summers and very heavy monsoon rainfall. The hot pre-monsoon/summer period runs from March to May, when daytime temperatures typically range from about 30–34 °C and humidity rises before the onset of the south-west monsoon. The main rainy season is from June to September, with frequent heavy showers, strong coastal winds and high humidity; October–November are the retreating monsoon months with occasional rainfall, and December–February are comparatively dry and mild.

Udupi is one of Karnataka’s wettest districts. Long-term district averages reported by state/meteorological sources put Udupi’s average annual rainfall in the range of about 4,200–4,500 mm (IMD/state reports give figures such as ~4,535 mm in recent state summaries). This places Udupi among the highest-rainfall districts in Karnataka and India.

The district has recorded exceptionally high totals in some years. For example, Udupi recorded very high annual totals in the mid-2010s (reports note 2016 totals exceeding 5,900 mm in the district), and nearby taluks (Karkala) recorded exceptional localized totals the following year. In June 2025 Udupi received an unusually large monthly total (about 1,140 mm for June) and was reported as the highest-rainfall district in India for that month in IMD/press summaries. These event years are often cited when describing Udupi’s status as one of India’s wettest districts.

Udupi has a tropical climate.

Udupi had record rainfall during September 2020, with mass floods following soon after. The district received 315.3 mm rainfall which is a record in Udupi taluk during the last 40 years.

== Commerce and industry ==
A thermal power plant has been set up at Nandikoor in Udupi district, with installed capacity of 1200 MW and a further 1600 MW proposed.

Suzlon has a manufacturing facility at Padubidre for making blades for wind mills. The project has been mired in controversies, with the company announcing a lock-out in November 2017 that lasted for more than a month. Activities were again suspended in July 2018.

A strategic petroleum reserve is set up at an underground location in the village of Padur (Padoor) in the Udupi district.

At Shivalli Industrial Estate in Manipal a few small scale industries have set up factories. There are few clay roof tiles (Mangalore tiles) industry, Cashew nut processing industry, Coconut oil mills and fish meal industry in Udupi district. There are many small entrepreneurs who make Pickles, Happala (Pappad), Spices powder and other food products in this district. Prior to nationalisation of commercial banks and insurance companies in early 1960s the district had many private banks and insurance companies. Syndicate Bank, Corporation Bank and Canara Bank had genesis in this district (then South Kanara district) before independence of India from British in 1947 A.D.

== Notable people ==
- V. S. Acharya
- Ravi Basrur
- Siddharth Basrur
- P. Gururaja Bhat, historian of Tulunadu
- K. Raghupati Bhat
- Ramesh Bhat
- Bannanje Govindacharya, Madhva philosophy scholar
- Oscar Fernandes
- Harini, Kannada movie heroine
- K. Jayaprakash Hegde
- N. Santosh Hegde
- Pooja Hegde
- K. Shivaram Karanth
- Kashinath
- V. Sunil Kumar
- Pramod Madhwaraj
- Veerappa Moily
- Ramdas Pai
- T. M. A. Pai
- Kota Srinivas Poojary
- Vinaya Prasad
- Udupi Ramachandra Rao, space scientist and former chairman of ISRO
- Ravi Shastri
- B. R. Shetty
- Dayanand Shetty
- Rakshit Shetty
- Rishab Shetty
- Upendra
- B. Vittalacharya, film director in Telugu, Tamil cinema

== See also ==
- List of villages in Udupi district
- Udupi cuisine
- Kere Basadi
- South Kanara (North) (Lok Sabha constituency)
- South Kanara (South) (Lok Sabha constituency)
- Kukkikatte
- Bankerkatta
- Kuthpady
- Malpe
- Tonse
- St. Mary's Islands
- Udyavara
- Udupi District Stadium
- Yenagudde
