= Venkataramana =

Venkataramana may refer to:

== People ==
- M. Venkataramana
- Villuri Venkataramana
- Dasari Venkataramana
- Dasari Venkataramana
- Mullapudi Venkataramana
- Mopidevi Venkataramana
- T. N. Venkataramana
- N. K. Venkataramana
- Venkataramana Bhagavathar
- V. Venkataramana Reddy
- Babukodi Venkataramana Karanth
- Ganapathi Venkataramana Iyer
- Singanallur Venkataramana Iyer Sahasranamam
- Kurunji Venkataramana Gowda

== Places ==
- Kote Venkataramana Temple, Bengaluru
- Sri Venkataramana Temple, Karkala
- Chintala Venkataramana Temple
- Gingee Venkataramana Temple
- Sri Varatha Venkataramana Higher secondary school
- Immadihalli#History of Sri Venkataramana Swamy Temple
- Vontikoppal#Lakshmi Venkataramana Temple
- Bangalore Fort#Kote Venkataramana Temple
- Sirsi, Karnataka#Manjuguni Venkataramana Temple

== See also ==
- Venkataraman (disambiguation)
