= Amara Sullia Rebellion =

Armed uprising against British Rule in British India

The Amara Sullia Rebellion (also called Kalyanappana Katakayi or Amara Sulya Raitha) was an armed uprising against the British government organized by the people of Arebhashe, Kodava people, and Tulunadu that took place in 1837, twenty years before the Sepoy Mutiny of 1857.

The Amara Sullia Rebellion was basically a farmers’ rebellion.

The reason for the rebellion in Sullia was that the British dethroned the ruler of Kodagu, Chikkaveerrarajendra of Haleri dynasty in 1834 and later he was transferred to Bellore.

== History ==
In 1799, South Kanara came under British rule. But until Chikkaviraraja (1820–1844), the last of the Haleri chiefs, was overthrown, Coorg had a tenuous sense of independence. After Coorg was annexed, the Amarsullian magane and Puttur, which the British had given to the Raja of Coorg in 1804 for their convenience, were moved to the province of Kanara. It caused the inhabitants of these moved maganes to endure great suffering.They initially observed a shift in the way taxes were paid to the government. The revenue was given in kind during the reign of the Rajas of Coorg.

=== Reasons ===
There was a tradition of paying revenue to the monarch in the form of products before the Sulya Puttur of Dakshina Kannada became a province of Canara. Despite this, the British issued instructions requiring the residents of Kodagu and Dakshina Kannada to pay taxes in cash. People started to believe that foreigners were in charge and were syphoning off their hard-earned money under the pretence of taxation.

== Memorials ==
=== Banglegudde Bellare ===
The treasury of Britishers was present at Bellare of Sulya. Freedom fighters came directly from Maduvegadde to Bellare Bungalow and seized the treasury.

=== Guddemane Appaiah Gowda Statue Madikeri ===
A bronze statue of Guddemane Appaiah Gowda was unveiled by D. V. Sadananda Gowda at Field Marshal K.M. Cariappa Circle in Madikeri.

=== Kedambadi Ramaiah Gowda ===
A 22-foot tall bronze statue, named as "Statue of Gallantry" of Kedambadi Ramaiah Gowda was built at Bautagudda, in Mangalore as a tribute to his role in the freedom struggle.

== Heritage village status ==
Ubaradka Mittur village in Sullia taluk has been designated as a Heritage Village by the Government of Karnataka, for its contribution to freedom movement.

== See also ==
- Kedambadi Ramaiah Gowda
- Guddemane Appaiah Gowda
