= Mandekolu =

Mandekolu ಮಂಡೆಕೋಲು,
- Village
- Location in Karnataka, India Mandekolu (India)
- Coordinates: 12.55°N 75.29°E
- Country: India
- State: Karnataka
- District: Dakshina Kannada
- Taluks: Sullia

Government
  - Body: Gram panchayat

Population (2001)
  - Total: 5,565

Languages
  - Official: English, Kannada
  - Other spoken languages: Tulu, Malayalam, Arebhashe, Konkani, Marathi.
- Time zone: UTC+5:30 (IST)
- ISO 3166 code: IN-KA
- Vehicle registration: KA-21
- Website: karnataka.gov.in

Mandekolu is a village in the southern state of Karnataka, India. The nearest cities are Sullia, Adoor and Kasaragod. It is located near the Karnataka-Kerala border on the banks of River Payaswini(Chandragiri), at a distance of 86 km from Mangalore city. It is located in the Sullia taluk of Dakshina Kannada district in Karnataka. Former chief Minister of Karnataka, D.V Sadananda Gowda hails from this village. Wild elephants are found roaming in this village

== Temple and places to visit ==
Sri Mahavishnumurthy Temple Mandekolu, Kaleri Sri Ullakulu Daivasthana, Panjikal hanging bridge, Parappa hanging bridge, Bolugallu Jatadhari daivasthana

== Notable people ==
- D. V. Sadananda Gowda (born 1953), politician

== Demographics ==
As of 2001 India census, Mandekolu had a population of 5565 with 2745 males and 2820 females.

== See also ==
- Dakshina Kannada
- Districts of Karnataka
- Tulu Gowda
