= Guddemane Appaiah Gowda =

Indian freedom fighter (c. 1792–1837)

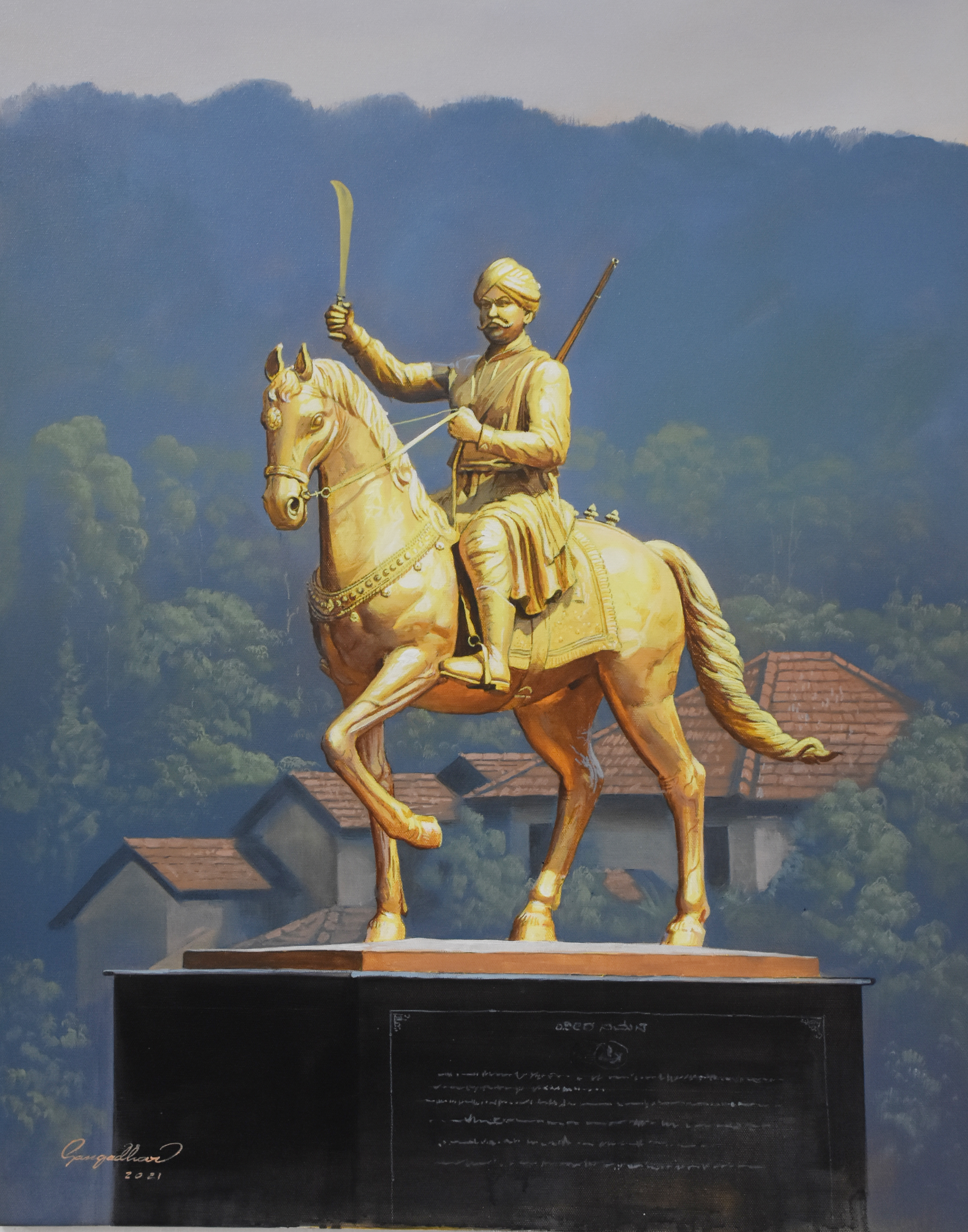
- Statue of Subedar Guddemane Appaiah Gowda in Madikeri
- Born: c. 1792; Balamuri Village, Kingdom of Coorg (present day Kodagu)
- Died: 31 October 1837 (aged 44–45); Madikeri Fort, Kingdom of Coorg (present day Kodagu)
- Cause of death: Execution by hanging
- Other name: Guddera Appu
- Known for: Amara Sullia Rebellion
- Title: Subedar
- Father: Guddemane Subbaiah

Guddemane Appaiah Gowda (c. 1792 – 31 October 1837) was an Indian rebel, he instated a peasant army from Kodagu and became its commander in-chief to lead the Amara Sullia Rebellion in 1837. His great grandson Sujith Guddemane is prominent lawyer from Sullia, practising before the High Court of Karnataka. They were successful in hoisting the native flag after lowering the Union Jack, which is known to be the first-ever freedom movement against the East India Company. They established a civil government in Mangalore for 13 days under his leadership.

== Early life ==
Guddemane Appaiah Gowda was born in 1792, the eldest son of Guddemane Subbaiah at Balamuri village in Kodagu. He belonged to the Arebhashe Gowda community.

Appaiah initially served as a Jemadar under King Linga Rajendra II of Kodagu. He was later promoted as Subedar during the rule of Chikka Virarajendra.

== Contributions ==
The people of Kodagu were ordered to pay the heavy tax to the East India Company. In opposition to this, Appaiah Gowda built his own army and became its commander-in-chief. He led the Amara Sullia Rebellion along with leaders like Kedambadi Ramaiah Gowda. They ruled for 13 days in Mangalore's Bautagudde. Under his leadership, the Native Jangama flag was hoisted in Mangalore's Bautagudde. Appaiah and his associates established a civil government and ruled for 13 days. Until they were defeated by the British troops.

== Death ==
Guddemane Appaiah Gowda was captured by the British and their accomplices. Guddemane Appaiah Gowda was hanged in front of Madikeri Fort on 31 October 1837 at 10-45 AM, sentenced as an open traitor by the Company rule in India.

== Legacy ==
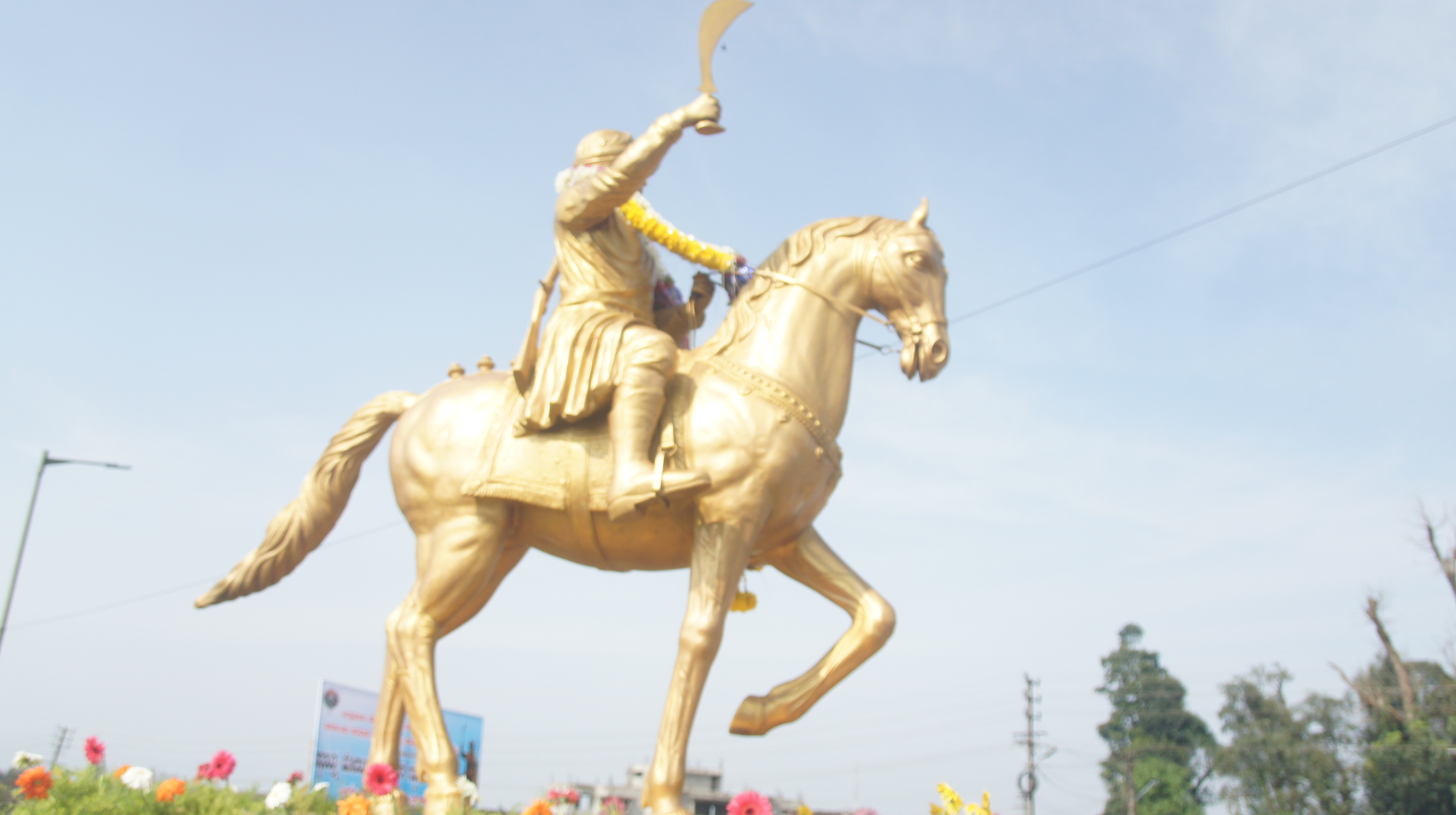
Statue of Subedar Guddemane Appaiah Gowda in Madikeri

A bronze statue of Guddemane Appaiah Gowda was unveiled by D. V. Sadananda Gowda at Field Marshal K.M. Cariappa Circle in Madikeri. Demands have been made to include the contribution of Guddemane Appaiah Gowda in school textbooks.
