= Pursere Kattuna =

Folk dance of Karnataka

Pursere Kattuna is a religious and traditional folk dance form of Tulunadu, performed mainly in the villages of Belthangady taluk in the Dakshina Kannada district of Karnataka, India. The performance is held during the full moon in the month of Suggi according to the Tulu calendar.

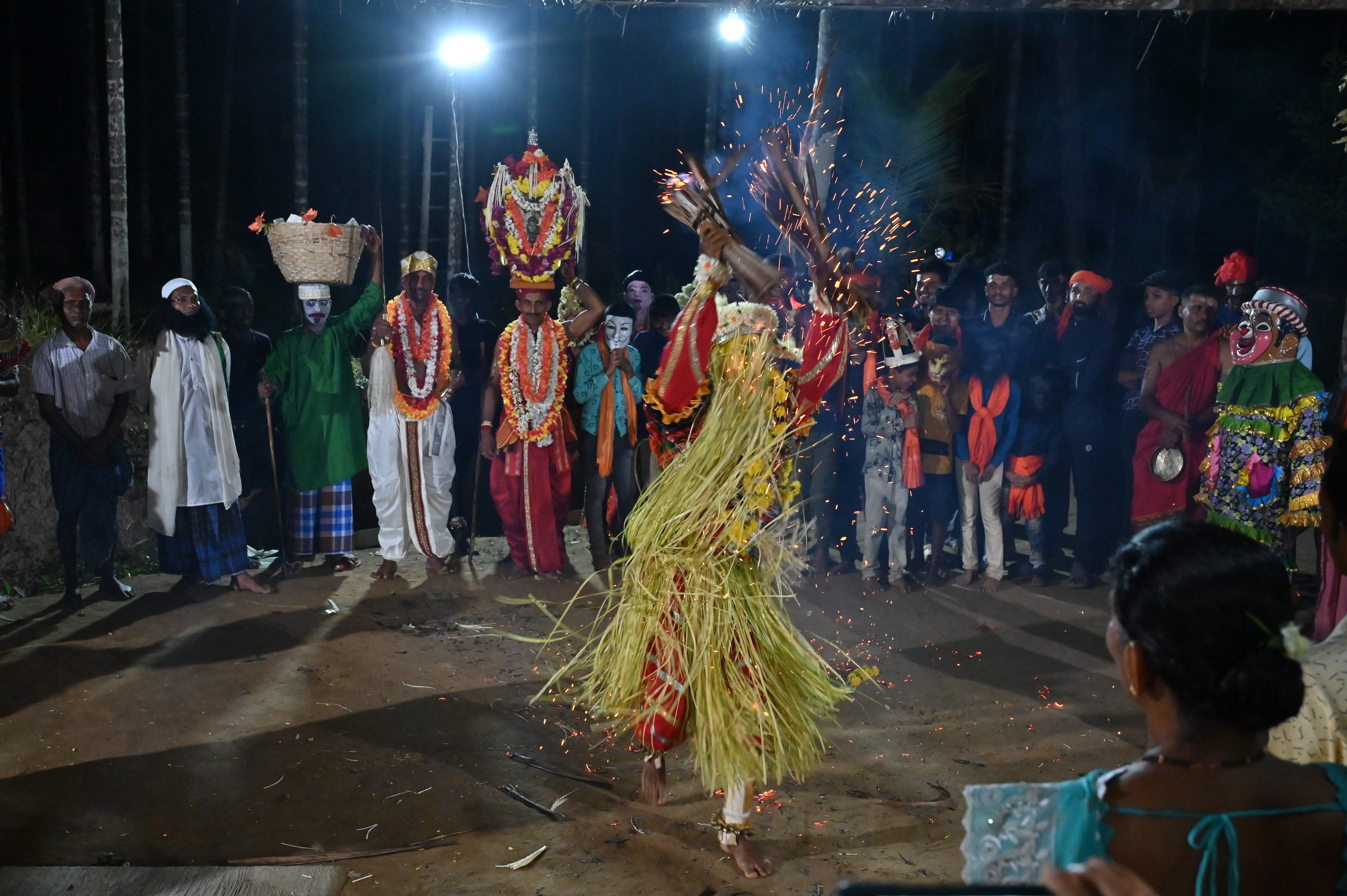
Pursa Kattuna

Pursa Kattuna Tulu Documentary

== Performance ==
Pursa Kattuna takes place from late evening until the early hours of the morning. Dancers visit the homes of people belonging to different social strata, blessing them with healing, prosperity and protection. The ritual includes acting, singing, dancing, symbolic storytelling and mythological mimicry. Performers interact with each other and with the public during the different stages of the enactment.

The style shows influence from the Natha Pantha spiritual tradition. Individuals embody different characters, and the performance continues throughout the night as a community event.

== Characters and costumes ==
Pursa Kattuna uses a wide range of costumes and roles representing various castes, professions, mythic figures and social archetypes. Costumes may depict:

- Brahmins and priests
- Mendicants, ascetics and fortune tellers
- Koti Chennaya
- Wild animals including bears, tiger, lion, monkey
- Scholars, thieves, ghosts and spiritual entities
- Christian male character, Muslim female character
- Characters that challenge or provoke through humor, mimicry and farce

The performances are mainly initiated by the Tulu Gowda community, although people from other communities also join and participate.

A similar type of performance exists in the Sullia region, but it uses a different costume style known as Siddavesha. The three notable mythic farce characters associated with Siddavesha are Sanyasi, Bhatru and Dasayye.

== Instruments ==
The musical instruments used in Pursa Kattuna includes Tase, Dolu, Nadaswara, Shruti. These instruments guide the rhythm of the dance, mythic dialogues and singing sequences throughout the night.

== Cultural significance ==
Pursa Kattuna is a living heritage practice of Tulunadu, combining ritual healing, traditional belief, humor, performance art and community theatre. It showcases the folk imagination of Tulu society and preserves oral narratives, mythic storytelling, and seasonal practices.
