= Choudlu =

Village in Karnataka, India

Choudlu is a village in the southern state of Karnataka, India. It is located in the Somvarpet taluk of Kodagu district.

== Demographics ==
As of 2001 India census, Choudlu was found to have a total population of 5,351 people: 2,669 male and 2,682 female.

== See also ==
- Kodagu
- Districts of Karnataka
- Mangalore
