= Arebhashe dialect =

Kannada dialect of India

Arebhashe
- ಅರೆಭಾಷೆ
- Native to: India
- Region: Sullia, Kodagu, Kasaragod
- Ethnicity: Arebhashe Gowda
- Language family: Dravidian: Southern; Southern I; Tamil–Kannada; Kannada–Badaga; Kannadoid; Kannada; Southwestern; Arebhashe
- Writing system: Kannada script

Official status
- Regulated by: Karnataka Arebhashe Samskruthi mathu Sahitya Academy

Language codes
- ISO 639-3: –
- Glottolog: areb1239

Arebhashe (Kannada: ಅರೆಭಾಷೆ, romanized: Arebhāṣe, IPA: [ɐrebʰaːʂe]), or Aregannada or Gowda Kannada, is a dialect of Kannada mainly by Gowda communities in the regions of Madikeri, Somwarpet, and Kushalnagar taluks of Kodagu district, Coorg, Sullia and Puttur taluks of Dakshina Kannada district, as well as Bandadka, Kasaragod District in the Indian state of Kerala. The language was recognized by the Karnataka State government and formed an academy in 2011 to preserve the culture and literature of the Arebhahse Region which is named as Karnataka Arebhashe Samskruthi mathu Sahitya Academy supported by then Chief Minister D. V. Sadananda Gowda.

Arebhashe Shobhane

== History ==
According to linguistic scientists, it is very close to the Badaga language in the Dravidian language. There was a time when Vokkaliga Gowda came from Iguru and started living in Dakshina Kannada and Kodagu district, also Kasaragod District of Kerala State. They migrated to Coorg (Kodagu) from Mangalore-Udupi (Dakshina Kannada-Udupi) region, to settle among the Canarese Tulu speaking people. And different communities in this region speak Arebhashe as a communication language.

== Geographic distribution ==
Arebhashe is mainly concentrated in the state of Karnataka. There are more than five hundred thousand people speaking Arebhashe in Dakshina Kannada, Kodagu districts in Karnataka and Kasaragod in Kerala are the districts where Arebhashe speaking people live for centuries. They are now spread all over India, especially in metropolitan cities of Mumbai, Bengaluru, and other industrial and business centers. Arebhashigas are also in large numbers in countries like the United States of America, the United Kingdom, United Arab Emirates, GCC countries and other places outside India.

== Grammar ==
The accepted word order of Arebhashe is SOV (subject-object-verb), same as of Kannada languages. This language lacks aspirated consonants. This is core aspects of the majority of Dravidian languages that set them apart from Indo-Aryan language such Hindi, Marathi, etc. There is a very close connection to Kundagannada and Havigannada dialect. The gender distinction in Arebhashe is as similar to Brahui, a member of the North Dravidian linguistic system. There is no female gender distinction and no difference in the plural masculine, neuter gender. Arebhashe is different from the Kannada language and has difficult to understand accent and words because of its special vowels and colloquialism. Arebhashe is also influenced and got words from Southwestern languages such as Tulu and Malayalam.

=== Phonology ===
The study of sounds in speech is known as phonology. The Arebhashe has 22 consonants and 13 vowels. There are no breathy letters in Arebhashe like Kannada language.

==== Vowels ====
| | Front | | Back | |
| | short | long | short | long |
|---|---|---|---|---|
| Close | i (ಇ) | iː (ಈ) | u (ಉ) | uː (ಊ) |
| Mid | e (ಎ) | eː (ಏ) | o (ಒ) | oː (ಓ) |
| Open | | | ɐ (ಅ) | aː (ಆ) |

- /ɐ/ and /aː/ are phonetically central [ɐ, äː]. /ɐ/ may be as open as /aː/ ([ä]) or higher [ɐ].

==== Consonants ====
| | | Labial | Dental/ Alveolar | Retroflex | Post-alv./ Palatal | Velar | Glottal |
|---|---|---|---|---|---|---|---|
| Nasal | | m (ಮ) | n (ನ) | ɳ (ಣ) | ɲ (ಞ) | ŋ (ಙ) | |
| Stop/ Affricate | voiceless | p (ಪ) | t̪ (ತ) | ʈ (ಟ) | tʃ (ಚ) | k (ಕ) | |
| Stop/ Affricate | voiced | b (ಬ) | d̪ (ದ) | ɖ (ಡ) | dʒ (ಜ) | ɡ (ಗ) | |
| Fricative | | | s (ಸ) | | | | h (ಹ) |
| Approximant | | ʋ (ವ) | l (ಲ) | ɭ (ಳ) | j (ಯ) | | |
| Trill | | | r (ರ) | | | | |

==== Pronouns ====
| English | Kannada | Arebhashe |
|---|---|---|
| I | Nānu (ನಾನು) | Nā (ನಾನು / ನಾ) |
| We | Nāvu (ನಾವು) | Nāv (ನಾವ್/ನಾವು) |
| You (Singular) | Nīnu (ನೀನು) | Nī (ನೀ) |
| You (Plural) | Nīvu (ನೀವು) | Nīv (ನೀವ್/ನೀವು) |
| He | Avanu (ಅವನು) | Ava (ಅಂವ) |
| She | Avalu (ಅವಳು) | Avlu (ಅವ್ಳ್) |
| It | Adu (ಅದು) | Adh(ಅದ್) |
| They (Neutral) | Avaru (ಅವರು) | Avu (ಅವ್) |

==== Cases ====
Arebhashe has eight cases: Because the traditional study of Arebhashe grammar is based on Kannada grammar and in turn, Kannada grammar is based on Sanskrit grammar, a fifth case (since the dative case is the fourth case and the genitive case is the sixth in the traditional order of the cases) is sometimes considered: the ablative case (ಅಪಾದಾನವಿಭಕ್ತಿ). This case is formed periphrastically by combining the genitive case of the noun supposedly in the ablative with the instrumental-case form of the noun 'ದೆಸೆ', meaning 'cause, vicinity, place, point'. Thus the Kannada ablative literally translates to 'from/by the cause/point of the {noun}'. However, this 'ablative' form is not commonly used colloquially, and exists only for propriety—it is not a true case, serving only to provide a parallel to the Sanskrit ablative. In its place, the third case, the instrumental-ablative case, is normally used.

The nominative is unmarked in Arebhashe. The Accusative-Genitive and Instrumental-Ablative are homophonous pairs in Arebhashe, while in Kannada, only the latter pair is met with. The Locative marker occurs only in inanimate nouns. in Arebhashe, but in Kannada, it occurs inanimate nouns also. However, inanimate nouns in Kannada, when necessary, the Locative sense is expressed by Postpositions. The distinction between the Accusative and Genitive is sometimes determined in -a ending inanimate nouns, by the kind of Inflexional increments with which they occur. e.g. mara-n-a kaɖi ಮರ-ನ-ಕಡಿ 'cut the tree' (Acc), mara-d-a gellɨ ಮರ-ದ-ಅ-ಗೆಲ್ಲ್ 'branch of the tree'. Such instances are rare in number and moreover, -n- is sometimes used in both functions. e.g. mara-n-a gellɨ mara-d-a gellɨ 'branch of the tree', mara-n-a kad̪i‌ ಮರ-ನ-ಅ-ಕಡಿ 'cut the tree'. This variation, perhaps be explained through old Kannada examples, where we come across a few words of the inanimate class taking the same ending as the animate class. e.g. mara-n-a ಮರ-ನ-ಅ 'of the tree', koɭan-a ಕೊಲನ-ಅ 'of the lake', polan-a ಪೊಲನ-ಅ 'of the field' etc. -n occurring before the case marker, perhaps indicates the Singular number, since, these are the concrete objects and therefore countable. Abstract nouns, or the objects which occur in a group or mass, are treated with -m ending. e.g. guɳam ಗುಣಂ 'good character' (Nom), and such nouns will have -d- as Inflexional increment before case markers other than the Dative. e.g. guna-d-a ಗುಣ-ದ-ಅ of the good character', ku:ʈa-d-a ಕೂಟ-ದ-ಅ 'of the gathering', ru:pa-d-a ರೂಪ-ದ-ಅ 'of the beauty. Though this irregularity in pattern was levelled in middle and modern Kannada Arebhashe, seems to have retained the old pattern in having the variation regarding the Inflexional Increments, referred to above.

=== Cases table ===
| Case | 'Standard Kannada' Case-termination | Arebhashe Case |
|---|---|---|
| nominative case ಪ್ರಥಮಾ(ಕರ್ತೃವಿಭಕ್ತಿ-kartr̥vibhakti) | ಉ | maravu(ಮರವು) | Ø |
| accusative case ದ್ವಿತೀಯಾ(ಕರ್ಮವಿಭಕ್ತಿ-karmavibhakti) | ಅನ್ನು | maravannu(ಮರವನ್ನು) | ನ | mara-na(ಮರನ) |
| instrumental case ತೃತೀಯಾ(ಕರಣವಿಭಕ್ತಿ-karaṇavibhakti) | ಇಂದ | mara-dinda(ಮರದಿಂದ) | ನ್ದ | mara-nda(ಮರಂದ) |
| dative case ಚತುರ್ಥೀ(ಸಂಪ್ರದಾನವಿಭಕ್ತಿ-sampradānavibhakti) | ಇಗೆ/ಇಕ್ಕೆ | mara-kke(ಮರಕ್ಕೆ) | ಕೆ/ಗೆ - ke/ge/nge | mara-ke(ಮರಕೆ) |
| ablative case ಪಂಚಮೀ(ಅಪಾದಾನವಿಭಕ್ತಿ-apādānavibhakti) | ದೆಸೆಯಿಂದ | marada-deseyinda(ಮರದ ದೆಸೆಯಿಂದ) | ನ್ದ | mara-nda(ಮರಂದ) |
| genitive case ಷಷ್ಠೀ(ಸಂಬಂಧವಿಭಕ್ತಿ-saṃbandhavibhakti) | ಅ | mara-da(ಮರದ) | ಅ | mara-na/a(ಮರನ/ಮರ) |
| locative case ಸಪ್ತಮೀ(ಅಧಿಕರಣವಿಭಕ್ತಿ-adhikaraṇavibhakti) | ಅಲ್ಲಿ | marada-alli(ಮರದಲ್ಲಿ) | ಲಿ | mara-li(ಮರಲಿ) |
| vocative case ಸಂಭೋದನಾ(ಸಂಬೋಧನಾವಿಭಕ್ತಿ-saṃbōdhanāvibhakti) | ಏ | mara-vē(ಮರವೇ) | ಏ | mara-vē(ಮರವೇ) |

==== Accusative case ====
{a} / -a / -na
/ -a occurs after nouns stem ending in consonants.
E.g. / -a : 'It' - ad-ar-a - ಅದ್‌-ಅರ್‌-ಅ; 'them' - av-ar-a - ಅವ್-ಅರ್-ಅ; 'whom' - ya:r-a - ಯಾ-ರ್-ಅ

/ -na occurs elsewhere.
E.g. / -na : 'elder sister'-akka-na-ಅಕ್ಕ-ನ; 'mother'-avva-na-ಅವ್ವ-ನ; 'father'-appa-na-ಅಪ್ಪ-ನ; 'the tree'-mara-na-ಮರ-ನ; 'the blind woman'-kurd-i-na-ಕುರ್ಡ್-ಇ-ನ

==== Instrumental case ====
{-nda}-da nda

/ -da occurs after -n ending stems in demonstratives.
E.g. / -da : 'by him'-av-á-n-da-ಅವ್-ಅ-ನ್‌-ದ 'by this man'-iv-a-n-da-ಇವ್-‌ಅ-ನ್‌-ದ

/ -nda occurs elsewhere.
E.g. / -nda : 'by father'-appa-nda-ಅಪ್ಪ-ನ್‌ದ; 'by the tree'-mara-nda-ಮರ-ನ್‌ದ; 'by it or her'-ad-ar-nda-ಅದ್‌-ಅರ್‌-ನ್‌ದ 'by the cat'-kotti-nda-ಕೊತ್ತಿ-ನ್‌ದ 'by the ladder'-e:ni-nda-ಏಣಿ-ನ್‌ದ

==== Dative case ====
{ ɲge } /-ke /-ɲge /-ge

/-ke occurs after the noun stems having the Inflexional increment -k, and also after the Demonstrative and Interrogative pronouns.
E.g. /-ke : 'to the tree'-mara-k-ke-ಮರ-ಕ್‌-ಕೆ(ಮರಕ್ಕೆ) 'to the book'-pustaka-k-ke-ಪುಸ್ತಕ-ಕ-ಕೆ; 'to the money-haɲa-k-ke-ಹಣ-ಕ-ಕೆ; 'to it'-adi-ke- ಅದಿ-ಕೆ 'to this'-idi-ke-ಇದಿ-ಕೆ; 'to which'-ya-di-ke-ಯಾ-ದಿ-ಕೆ; to which (pl)-ya:vu-ke-ಯಾ-ಉ-ಕೆ(ಯಾವಕ್ಕೆ)

/-ɲge occurs after -a ending Noun stems belonging to animate class.
E.g. /-ɲge : 'to father'-appa-ɲge-ಅಪ್ಪ-ನ್‌ಗೆ; 'to mother'-avva-ɲge-ಅವ್ವ-ನ್‌ಗೆ; 'to elder sister'-akka-ɲge-ಅಕ್ಕ-ನ್‌ಗೆ; to the buffalo-ko:ɲa-ɲge-ಕೋಣ-ನ್‌ಗೆ to the parrot-gi:ɲa-ɲge-ಗಿಣ-ನ್‌ಗೆ

/-ge occurs elsewhere.
E.g. /-ge : 'to the donkey'-katte-ge-ಕತ್ತೆ-ಗೆ 'to the coat'-ko:țu-ge-ಕೋಟು-ಗೆ 'to the car'ka:rɨ-ge-ಕಾರ್-ಗೆ

== Literature ==
Arebhashe has many kinds of literature including epics, novels, dramas, dictionaries, poems, riddles, proverbs, and folktales

- The epic "Manasa Bharatha" written by K. Kushalappa Gowda
- Dictionary " Arebhashe Shabdakosha" by Gangadhara and Arebhahse - Kannada English Dictionary by Karnataka Arebhashe Samskruthi Mattu Sahithya Academy
- Arebhahse Grammar by Prof. K Kushalappa Gowda
- Arebhahshe paramparika Kosha

=== Folk literature ===
The oral traditions of Arebhashe is one of the major traditions that show the finer aspects of the language. The following are various forms of Arebhashe oral tradition and literature.

- Shobhane: One that is commonly recited on occasion marriage function. This is the theme of the way of life of Hindu gods Rama and Seeta.
- Paddanas: This is recited in a ritualistic context by particular communities of the Arebhashe region on the occasion of the Hindu rituals of Bhuta Kola. These Paddanas are mostly legends about gods or historical personalities among the people.
- Riddles and Proverbs: They are another important aspect of Arebahshe oral traditions.

An Arebhashe riddle (helike)

- Siddavesha: Siddavesa kind of religious and traditional folk dance it is also called as pursere kaṭṭunā and puruṣa makkaḷa kuṇita. Arebhashe gowdas of Sullia, Belthangady, Puttur perform full moon summer dance in month of Tulu calendar Suggi. In this same month, Suggi Nalike is also performed. Siddavesha is performed from late evening until morning which includes visiting homes of people from all stratas of society. This song is sung during Siddavesha Kunita
- Folktales : In Arebhashe cultures, there is no clear line separating myth from folk or fairy tale; all these together form the literature of preliterate societies.
  An Arebhashe folk tale
  Fairy tales may be distinguished from other folk narratives such as legends (which generally involve belief in the veracity of the events described) and explicit moral tales, including beast fables.

=== Theatre ===
==== Yakshagana ====
Yakshagana is a traditional theater, developed in Dakshina Kannada, Udupi, Uttara Kannada, Shimoga and western parts of Chikmagalur districts, in the state of Karnataka and in Kasaragod district in Kerala that combines dance, music, dialogue, costume, make-up, and stage techniques with a unique style and form. Theatre in the form of the traditional Yakshagana, Yakshagana Tāḷamaddaḷe and Drama prevalent in Arebhashe speaking region has greatly preserved the finer aspects of the Arebhashe language. Yakshagana which is conducted in Arebhashe is very popular among the Arebhashe People, they often perform it in summer.

==== Talamaddale ====
Tala-Maddale is an ancient form of performance dialogue or debate performance in this Arebhashe Region. The plot and content of the conversation are drawn from popular mythology but the performance mainly consists of an impromptu debate between characters involving sarcasm, puns, philosophy positions, and humor. The main plot is sung from the same oral texts used for the Yakshagana form of dance- drama. Performers claim that this was a more intellectual rendition of the dance during the monsoon season.

==== Arebhashe plays ====
Arebhashe plays are among the major entertainment for admirers of art and culture in the Arebhashe Region. Which generally centered on particular theme or comic genre or issue related.

== Centres of Arebhashe and government support ==
Arebhashe as a language continues to thrive in Sullia, Kodagu in Karnataka and part of Kasaragod in Kerala. Karnataka Arebhashe Samskruthi mathu Sahitya Academy, an institute established by the State Government of Karnataka in 2011. The academy focuses on the retrieval and Propagation of Arebhashe Language and Culture in part of Karnataka and part of Kerala through various activities such as creating glossary, translation, and archival work to preserve and develop the language and culture of the Arebhashe. The academy is also working on a documentary collection for veteran personalities of this region, Digitalization of Arebhashe Books, including a seminar on youth literature, a drama camp, art camp among the Arebhashe people etc. The academy is based in Madikeri.

Number of colleges have Arebhahse Language units and conducting various activities.

== Arebhashe Research Centre ==
State Government of Karnataka announced in the year 2022-23 for a research centre for "Arebhashe" in Mangaluru University.

== Notable Arebhashe people ==
- Kedambadi Ramaiah Gowda, 19th Century Freedom fighter
- Guddemane Appaiah Gowda, Freedom Fighter
- D V Sadananda Gowda, 20th Chief Minister of Karnataka and Former Union Minister
- K. G. Bopaiah, 19th Speaker of Karnataka Legislative Assembly
- Shobha Karandlaje, Politician
- Kurunji Venkataramana Gowda, Entrepreneur & Philanthropist
- K Kushalappa Gowda, Writer and scholar
- Dr. Purushottam Bilimale, Renowned Scholar
- N. Somanna, 1st Member of Parliament for Coorg State
- Aditi Chengappa South Indian actress
- Rachana Inder, South Indian actress

== See also ==
- Dakshina Kannada
- Sullia
- Tulu Gowda
- Karnataka ethnic groups
- Yakshagana
