= KVG =

KVG or kvg may refer to:

- Boazi language (ISO 639-3 language code kvg), a Papuan language spoken in the Western Province of Papua New Guinea
- Kavieng Airport (IATA airport code KVG), an airport in Kavieng, New Ireland, Papua New Guinea
- KVG College of Engineering, one of many engineering colleges in Karnataka, India
