= Thakeri =

- Village
- Location in Karnataka, India Thakeri (India)
- Coordinates: 12.589°N 75.804°E
- Country: India
- State: Karnataka
- District: Kodagu

Government
  - Body: Gram panchayat
- Elevation: 1,035 m (3,396 ft)

Population (2001)
  - Total: 1,586

Languages
  - Official: Kannada
- Time zone: UTC+5:30 (IST)
- PIN: 571236
- Telephone code: 08276
- ISO 3166 code: IN-KA
- Vehicle registration: KA-12
- Sex ratio: 1:1.05 ♂/♀
- Website: karnataka.gov.in

Thakeri is a village in Kodagu district in the Indian state of Karnataka. It is located about 9 km from Somwarpet. The village is famous for its coffee plantation and other agricultural activities.

== Geography ==
Thakeri is located at 12.59°N 75.80°E. It has an average elevation of 1035 metres (3396 feet).

== Plantations ==
Primary occupation of the people living here is agriculture and the plantation is Coffee and the village is full of coffee estates. Apart from that Black pepper, cardamom, banana, ginger is grown in the estates. Silver Oak trees which are grown for shade in the coffee estates are sold as timber which fetches the planters good revenue. A lot of citrus fruits are grown like orange, lime, sweetlime and many other varieties of this family.

== Languages spoken ==
Even though most of the people living here are Kannadigas, other languages like Kodava Takk, Tulu, English, Hindi and Tamil are understood by the people.

== See also ==
- Madikeri
- Mangalore
- Virajpet
