= Honnamana Kere =

Honnammana Kere
- Town
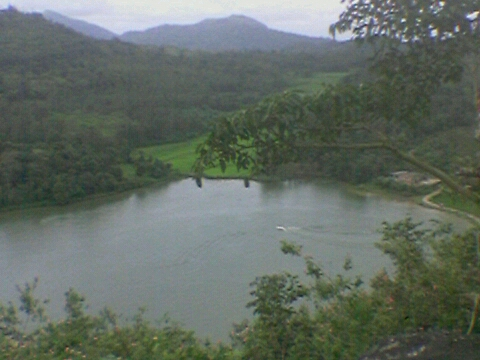

- Location of Somawarapete Honnammana Kere (India)
- Country: India
- State: Karnataka
- District: Kodagu

Languages
  - Official: Kannada
- Time zone: UTC+5:30 (IST)

Honnamana Kere (Honnama Lake) is a lake and holy place in Doddamalthe near the village of Sulimalthe, 6 km away from Somwarpet town of Coorg in the state of Karnataka, India. It is the biggest lake in Kodagu, and once a year, during the Gowri festival, a special pooja is conducted and a 'Bagina' which consists of the belongings of goddess Honamma is presented to the lake.

== History ==
The story Kerege Hara was derived from the building of Honnamana Kere. According to legend, a deity known as Goddess Honnamana sacrificed her life for the welfare of the people. A temple was erected in her honour and modernisation has recently been undertaken to provide improved facilities.

== Landscape ==
Honnamana Kere is surrounded by many mountains, cliffs and coffee plantations.

Landscape around Honnamana Kere

View from the Cliff (Gavi Betta)

== Places to stay ==
There are a few Homestays nearby Honnamana Kere. Tropical Rain a Homestay/ Farm Stay is located 1 km from this lake.

== Climate ==
The temperature in Honnamana Kere, like the rest of Coorg district, ranges from 16 to 27 degrees during the year.

== See also ==
- Somwarpet
- Shanivarsanthe
- Madikeri
- Mangalore
- Virajpet
- Honnammana Halla falls
