= Bellare =

Bellare may refer to:

- Bellare, Dakshina Kannada, a village in India
  - Banglegudde Bellare, a memorial in the village
- Mihir Bellare, an American cryptographer
