= Somwarpet taluk =

Somwarpet Taluk
- Taluk
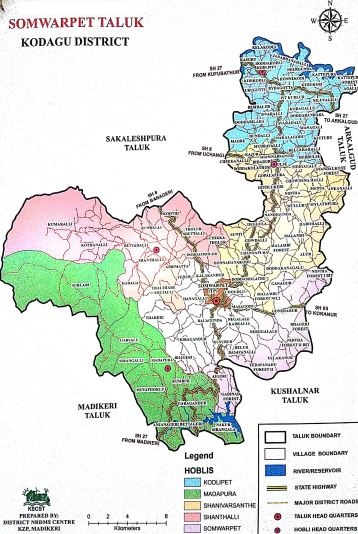
- Map of Somwarpet Taluk in the Kodagu District

- Location in Karnataka
- Coordinates: 12°35′51″N 075°50′54″E
- Country: India
- State: Karnataka
- District: Kodagu district
- Elected Representative(s): MLA

Government
  - Type: Taluk Panchayat
  - Body: Council

Area
  - Total: 1,003 km^{2} (387 sq mi)
- Elevation: 609 m (1,998 ft)

Population (2011)
  - Total: 205,921
  - Density: 205.3/km^{2} (531.7/sq mi)
  - Male Population: 102,739
  - Female Population: 103,182

Sex Ratio

Literacy Rate
- Area code: 08276
- Vehicle registration: KA-12
- No. of Villages: 135

Somawarpete taluk is one of the five taluks of Kodagu district. Its administrative headquarters is in the town of Somwarpet.

== Languages ==
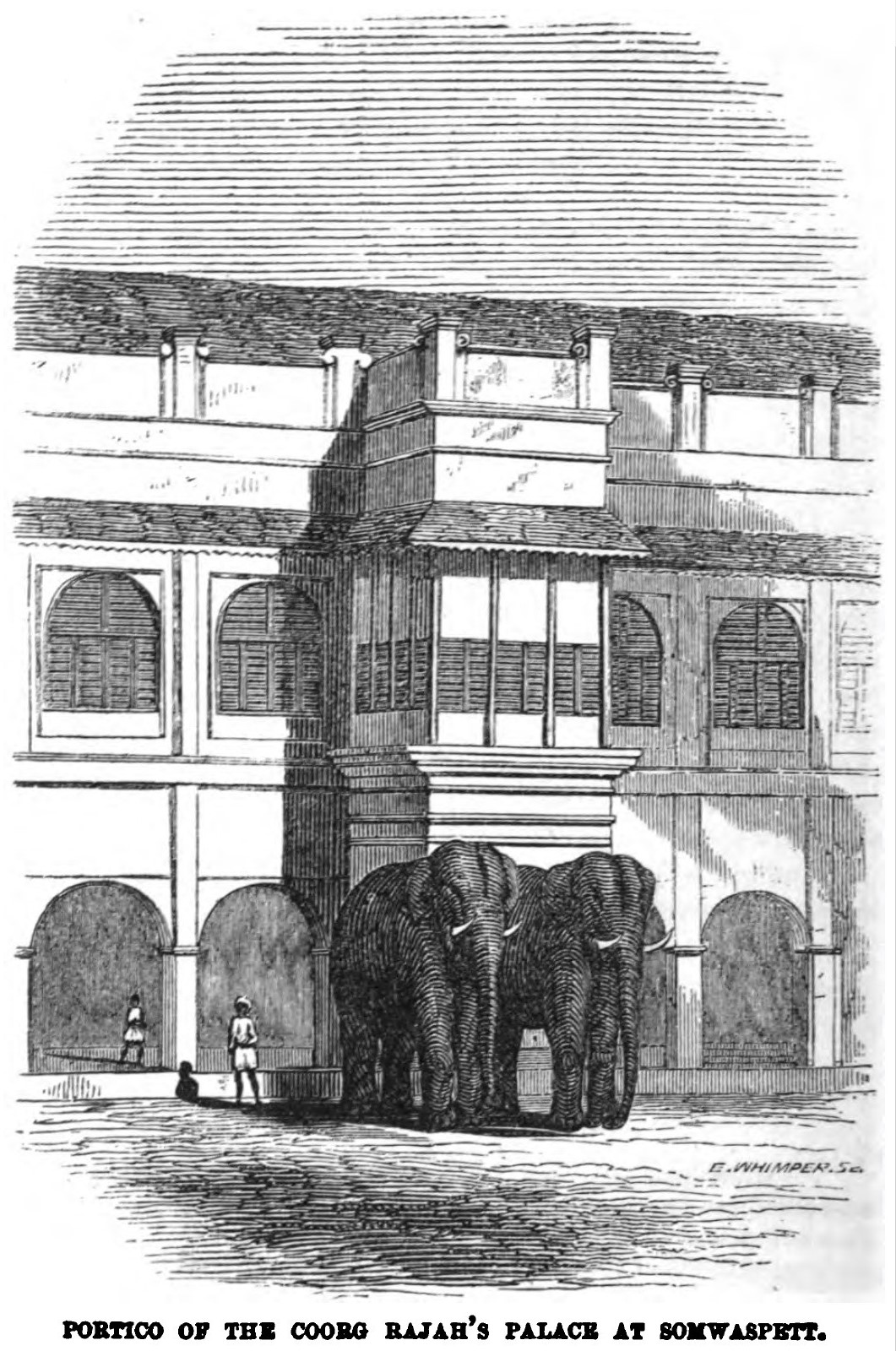
Portico of the Coorg Rajah's Palace at Somwaspett (May 1853, X, p.48)

Kannada, Are Bhashe, Kodava Takk, Beary bashe and English are spoken by the people.

== Flora and fauna ==
Coorg Apples in Sulimalthe village, Somwarpet

Coffee is the major crop in the region. It is the major Arabica coffee growing region of India. Other crops like pepper, cardamom, orange, vanilla are grown. Rice, ginger is also grown.

== Tourist attractions ==
Beelur Golf Club Beelur Golf Club is located 8 km from Somwarpet town. The lush green golf ground attracts movie makers.

Malemalleshwara Betta Malemalleshwara Betta is located 13 km from Somwarpet and 7 km from Shanivarsanthe. Pooja is conducted regularly and a Grand Celebration on Maha Shiva Rathri every year.

Kotebetta Kotebetta is the third highest peak in Coorg after Tadiyandamol and Brahmagiri, Kotebetta means "Fort Hill" because of its fort-like appearance. Its height above sea level is 1,620 m (5,310 ft). It lies near the border between the Dakshina Kannada and Coorg districts. The trek starting point is a junction near a bridge called Hattihole. The peak is 10 km (6.2 mi) from Hattihole. There is a Shiva temple at the base of Kotebetta.

Makkalagudi Betta is located in Kiraganduru 10 km between Somwarpet and Madikeri road. There is a view of paddy fields, forest, and the waters of the Harangi reservoir.

Mallalli Falls (Kannada:ಮಲ್ಲಳ್ಳಿ ಜಲಪಾತ) Mallalli Abbi or Kumaradhara Falls is one of the tallest waterfalls in the Coorg where the river Kumaradhara drops down 200 feet. Scattered along the stream are other misty waterfalls, situated on the foothills of the Pushpagiri hill-ranges, 25 km from Somwarpet.

Dubare Elephant Camp One of the interesting places in Coorg is the Dubare Elephant camp situated on the banks of River Kaveri. Here people can bathe and feed elephants. They can also take a ride on the elephants and spot gaur, crocodiles, sloth bears, and wild creatures amid lush greenery.

=== Other attractions in the Taluk ===
- Kushalanagar, a popular tourist destination located towards the south, along the Mysore–Madikeri road. Bylakuppe Tibetan settlement is located nearby.
- Harangi Reservoir
- Kanive Hanging Bride and Kudige
- Kaveri Nisargadhama
- Chiklihole reservoir
- Nagarhole National Park
- Kumara Parvata trek.
- Betttarashi betta
- Silent falls
- Doodakalu betta
- Gantukallu Betta

== See also ==
- Madikeri
- Mangalore
- Virajpet
- Kushalanagar
