= Chennu Nalike =

Chennu Nalike is an ancient traditional folk art form practised by Tulu people from the region of Tulu Nadu, India. This performing after the harvesting, in the month of suggi, is one of the month in Tulu calendar. It normally comes in the months of February and March.

Chennu Nalike

== Mera community ==
Mera (also known as Moger in Tulu and Mogera in Kannada), is a community of Tulu Nadu, India, an indigenous people mainly spread in the areas of modern Kasaragod District of Kerala and Mangalore, Udupi, Coorg Districts of Karnataka. They follow a matriarchal family system called as "Bari". The Language spoken by Meras is Tulu.

== Nalike ==
This kind of dance called nalike, performed by Mera community. It starts with Suggi Punnam and lasts for three to nine days as per head of community decided on there meeting.

=== Paddanas Song ===
Cennu cennugale cennu cennu cennugale
cennuna daṭṭigeḍ cennu binner baider
binnērērgale cennu binnērērgale
appelam'mela detti appelam'mēla..
Ō lam'mana pudar pan cennu apena pudar pan..
Ō lam'mana pudaryē detti kōṭeda babbund..
Ō appe pudaryē detti povambalakkambale..
Ō lēlēle cennu lēlēle...

== Ritual costumes ==
It has two characters that are Chennu and Koraga. Chennu has dress of woman with Sampige flower on head. It is performed in night. Men and women help in background music. They sing Paddanas.

== Belief ==
There is a belief that when Chennu Kunitha is going home to home in the month of suggi at night time, a kind of folk ritual done by Gowda community of Belthangady and Sullia called Siddavesa which should not come in front. If they come face-to-face clash will arise.
