= Karnataka Arebhashe Samskruthi mathu Sahitya Academy =

Academy in Karnataka, India

- Karnāṭaka Arebhāṣe Sanskr̥ti mattu Sāhitya Akāḍemi
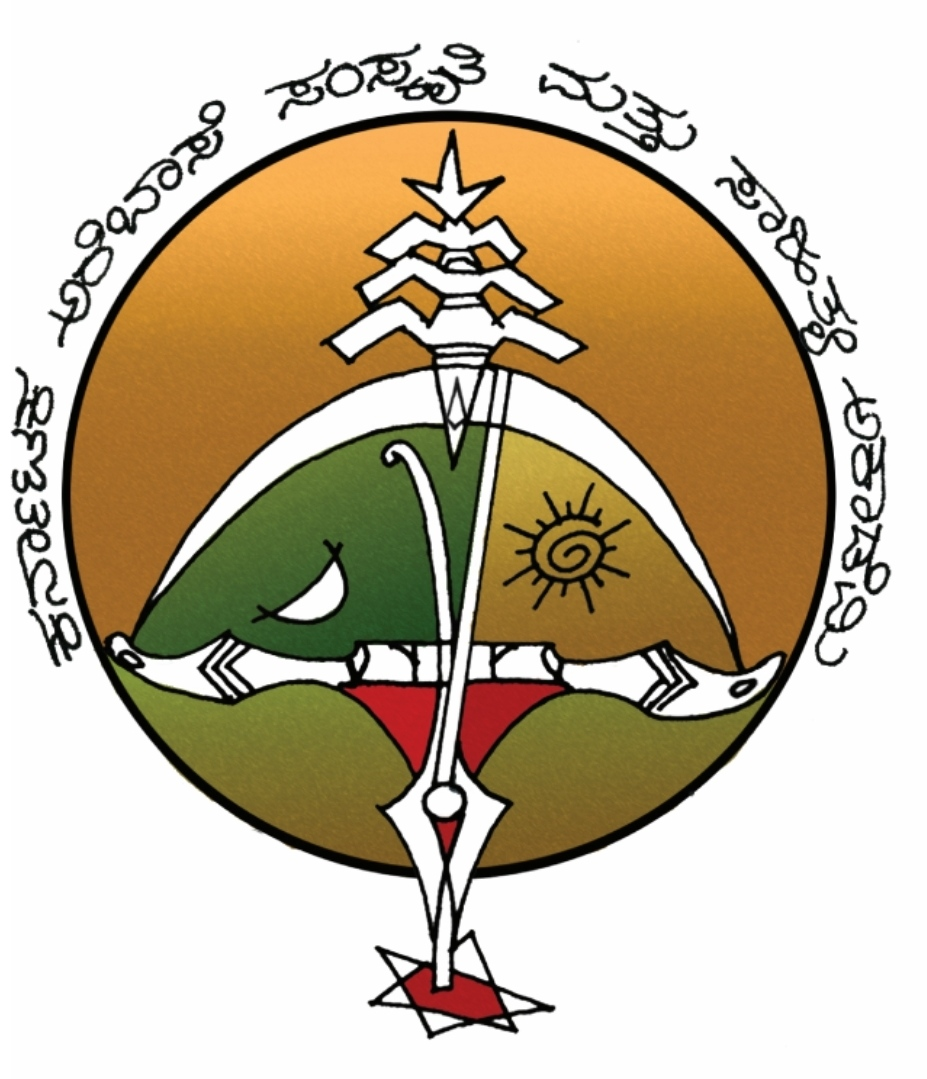
- Logo of Karnataka Arebhashe Samskruthi mathu Sahitya Academy
- Abbreviation: KASA
- Formation: 2011; 15 years ago
- Headquarters: Madikeri, Kodagu (Coorg)
- Location: Madikeri, Kodagu Sullia India
- Region served: India
- President: Sadananda Mavaji. (2024–present)
- Publication: Hingara (Quarterly)
- Parent organisation: Kannada and culture department, Government of Karnataka
- Website: arebhasheacademy.karnataka.gov.in

Karnataka Arebhashe Samskruthi mathu Sahitya Academy is an organization under Government of Karnataka for promotion of literature in Arebhashe language. It was established on 15 December 2011 by the Government of Karnataka. The purpose of the academy is to preserve and promote the Arebhashe language, Arebhashe literature, and Arebhashe culture, which has a considerable population of Arebhashe speakers, a language minority in the state Karnataka and Kerala. Arebhashe is a dialect of Kannada spoken mainly by Gowda and other community in the region of Kodagu, Sullia of Dakshina Kannada in the Indian state of Karnataka as well as Bandadka, Kasaragod District in the Indian state of Kerala. The academy was formed by then Chief Minister D. V. Sadananda Gowda.

== Work structure ==
The Karnataka Arebhashe Samskruthi mathu Sahitya Academy organizes workshops, seminars, cultural events, and gatherings for the Arebhashe public. It also provides research grants for research in Arebhashe language and culture; it publishes books and presents the annual awards in the fields of Arebhashe literature, folk arts, yakshagana, research and novel writing.

== Arebhashe Day ==
Karnataka Arebhashe Samskruthi mathu Sahitya Academy celebrates Arebhashe Dinacharane annually on 15 December.

== Magazine ==
The Academy has a library that houses a collection of books and magazines in Arebhase. It also publishes a quarterly magazine by name Hingara.

== Academy books ==
The academy published 60 books till 2022. Its big project books are Arebhashe Paramparika Kosha, Arebhashe Dictionary, and Arebhashe Vishwakosha

== Ongoing projects ==
Their current project is to educate the young generation planned for textbooks, glossary, translation, and archival work to preserve and develop the language and culture of the Arebashe Culture. The academy is also working on a documentary collection for veteran personalities of this region, including a seminar on youth literature, a drama camp, and poetry.

== See also ==
- Tulu Gowda
- Karnataka ethnic groups
