= K. Kushalappa Gowda =

Indian writer (1931–2022)

Kodi Kushalappa Gowda
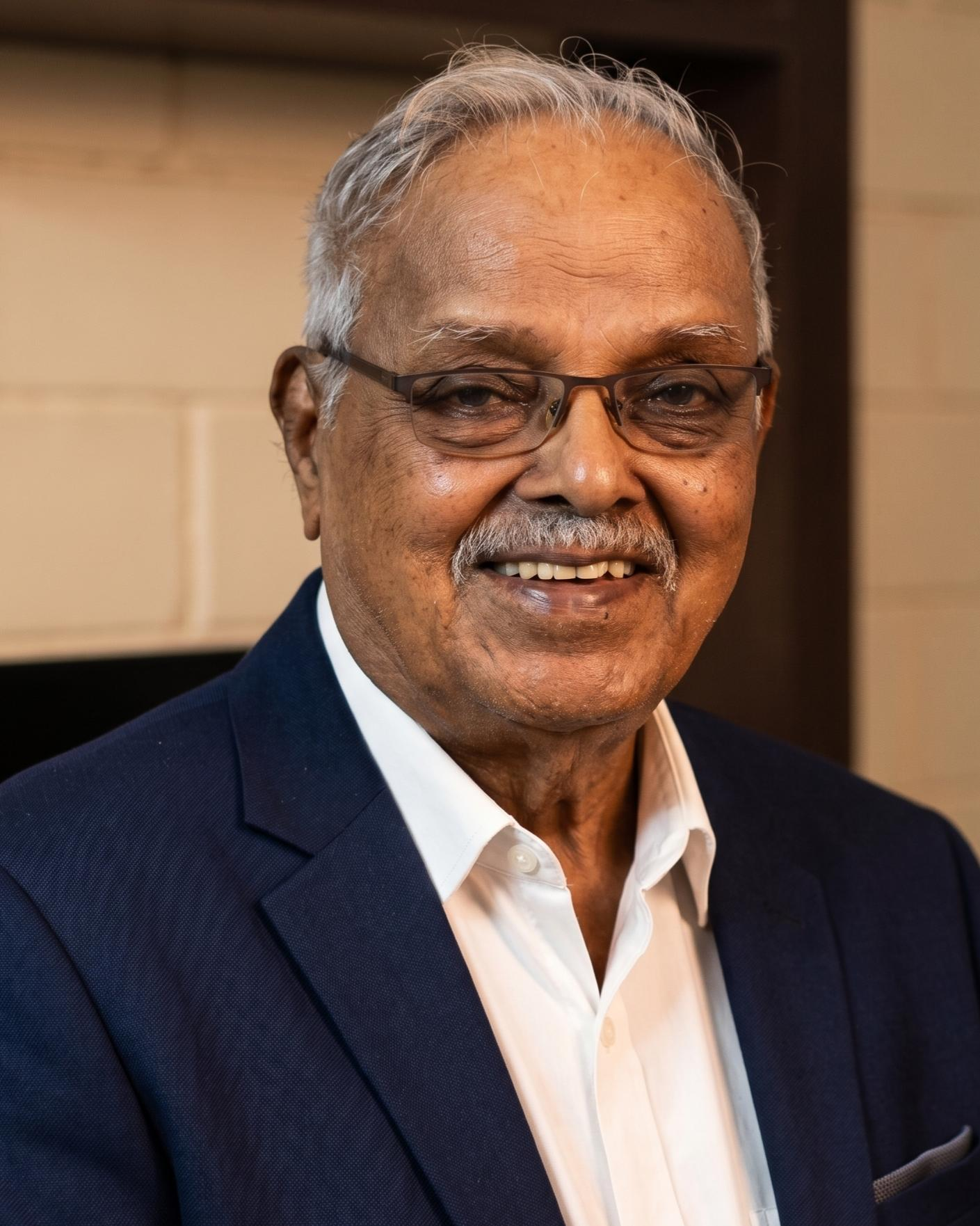
- Born: 30 May 1931; Mercara, Coorg Province, British India
- Died: 3 September 2022 (aged 91); Puttur, Karnataka, India
- Education: University of Madras, Annamalai University
- Occupations: Kannada scholar, grammarian, linguist

Kodi Kushalappa Gowda (30 May 1931 – 3 September 2022) was an Indian Kannada scholar, writer, Dravidologist and linguist. He published over 12 books on linguistics in Kannada and English.

== Early life and education ==
Born in 1931 at Kodi village near Mercara, Coorg Province, Gowda graduated in Kannada from the University of Madras in 1955 and obtained his master's from the same university in 1956. He obtained his doctorate from Annamalai University in 1963.

== Career ==
Gowda taught Kannada at the Annamalai University for 18 years and Madras University for 15 years. He has published more than 50 research papers and articles. Gowda was honoured with the Sahitya Academy Award for Kannada in 1987, Karnataka Rajyotsava award, Thimmappayya award and Nirpage award. Gowda headed the University of Madras' Kannada department till 1991. He awarded Karnataka Arebhashe Samskruthi mathu Sahitya Academy in 2019 for his prominent work towards Arebhashe Language. He writes Manasa Bharatha first epic of this Arebhashe Language and Grammar book.

== Death ==
Gowda died at a hospital in Puttur, Karnataka, on 3 September 2022, at the age of 91.

== Works ==
- Gowda, K. Kushalappa (1965). Gender distinction in Gowda, Kannada. Emeneau SaSThipu:rti commemoro tion volume-Indian Linguistics, Poona and Annamalai University.
- Gowda, K. Kushalappa (1969). For frequency of vowel changes in Gowda Kannada and Standard Kannda, a synchronic comparison- Paper presented in the Seminar on Comparative Dravidian and subsequently. Dravidian- by CAS in Linguistics, Annamalai University, Annamalainagar.
- Gowda, K. Kushalappa (1970). Gowda Kannada. Annamalai University.
- Gowda, K. Kushalappa (1972). A Grammar of Kannada: Based on the Inscriptions of Coorg, South Kanara and North Kanara Dts.100 to 1400 A.D. Annamalai University.
- Gowda, K. Kushalappa (1976). Dravidian case system. Annamalai University.
- Gowda, K. Kushalappa (1991). A course in modern Kannada. University of Madras.
