= Abbimatta =

- village
- Interactive map of Abbimatta
- Coordinates: 12.6325°N 75.8094°E
- Country: India
- State: Karnataka
- District: Kodagu
- Talukas: Somvarpet

Government
  - Body: Village Panchayat

Languages
  - Official: Kannada
- Time zone: UTC+5:30 (IST)
- Nearest city: Kodagu
- Civic agency: Village Panchayat

Abbimatta is a village in the southern state of Karnataka, India. It is located in the Somvarpet taluk of Kodagu district.

== See also ==
- Kodagu
- Districts of Karnataka
- Mangalore
