= Vaikunta Baliga College of Law =

Vaikunta Baliga College of Law (Formerly called as the Udupi Law College) was established in the year 1957 by late Dr.T.M.A.Pai. The college was named after Late Sri B.Vaikunta Baliga, a legal luminary and then minister of Law, Government of Mysore. It is affiliated to Karnataka State Law University.

== List of alumni ==
- D. V. Sadananda Gowda, former Chief Minister of Karnataka, Former Union Minister and Member of Parliament.
- V. Dhananjay Kumar, former Union Minister
