= Saint Philomena College, Puttur =

Educational institution in Karnataka, India

St Philomena College, Puttur
- Type: Educational Institution
- Established: 1958
- Founders: Msgr. Antony Patrao
- Affiliations: Mangalore University
- Principal: Rev. Dr Antony Prakash Monteiro
- Location: Darbe, Puttur, Karnataka, India
- Campus: 23.5 acres (9.5 ha)
- Website: spcputtur.ac.in

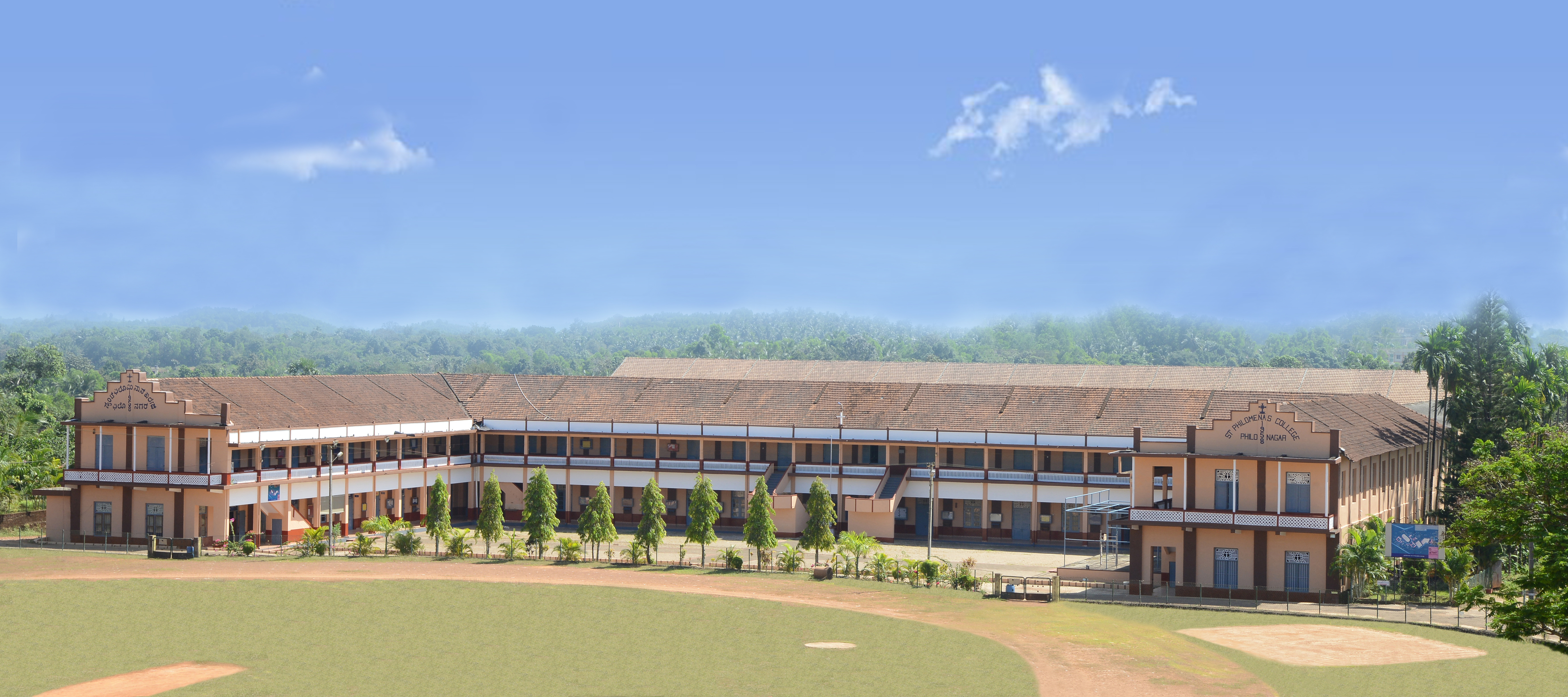

St Philomena College, Puttur is an educational institution for undergraduate and postgraduate studies situated in Puttur town in Karnataka state, India. The college is managed by the Catholic Board of Education (CBE) of the Diocese of Mangalore.

== History ==
Saint Philomena College was established by Monsignor Antony Patrao in 1958.

== Notable alumni ==
- Sadananda Gowda — former Chief Minister of Karnataka and former Union Minister for Ministry of Law and Justice; Ministry of Railways; Ministry of Statistics and Programme Implementation; Ministry of Chemicals and Fertilizers.
- A. S. Bopanna — former judge of Supreme Court of India.
- Shobha Karandlaje — Minister of State for Ministry of Labour and Employment, Ministry of Micro, Small and Medium Enterprises and Member of Parliament representing Bangalore North.
- B. A. Viveka Rai — senior Kannada researcher, critic, translator, folklorist.
