= Kurunji Venkataramana Gowda =

Indian educationist and founder of Academy of Liberal Education

Kurunji Venkatramana Gowda
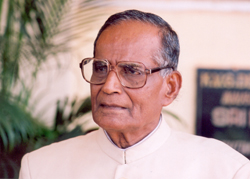
- Born: 26 December 1928; Sullia, Dakshina Kannada, Karnataka, India
- Died: 7 August 2013; Sullia, Karnataka, India
- Occupations: Educationist, Philanthropist
- Known for: Founder of Academy of Liberal Education (AOLE)
- Notable work: Establishment of multiple educational and healthcare institutions in Sullia
- Children: Chidhanada, Renuka Prasad and Govardni

Kurunji Venkatramana Gowda (26 December 1928 – 7 August 2013) was an Indian educationist and philanthropist. He was the founder-president of the Academy of Liberal Education (AOLE), Sullia, and is widely credited with transforming the then-backward region of Sullia in Dakshina Kannada into a major hub of education and healthcare.

== Early life ==
Gowda was born on 26 December 1928 in an agrarian family in what is now Sullia taluk of Dakshina Kannada district. His father died when Gowda was about 15 years old, which forced him to take responsibility for his family at a young age. Financial hardship meant that he discontinued his formal education after around eighth standard.

== Educational and social initiatives ==
Gowda believed strongly in education as a means for social upliftment and rural transformation. Under his vision, the Academy of Liberal Education was established in 1976.

The first institution under AOLE was Nehru Memorial College, Sullia (NMC), located at Kurunjibag, Sullia. Over the decades, the academy expanded to include a variety of educational and professional institutions – including engineering, medical, dental, ayurveda, nursing, polytechnic, ITI, law, and teacher yea training – turning Sullia and surrounding areas into a recognized educational hub.

- KVG Medical College and Hospital
- KVG College of Engineering
- KVG Polytechnic
- KVG Ayurveda Medical College and Hospital
- KVG Dental College
- Nehru Memorial College, Sullia

== Philosophy and social commitment ==
Gowda’s guiding philosophy emphasized hard work, integrity, honesty, discipline, service to marginalized communities, and upliftment through education. He believed that true empowerment for underprivileged communities — including Dalits, women, and the rural poor — could be achieved through access to education and healthcare.

== Business ==
Kurunji Venkatramana Gowda began his career through small business work at a young age. After leaving school due to family circumstances, he started a small shop in Sullia to support his household. This early experience introduced him to trade, finance, and community needs.

Over time, his business activities grew, and he became known as a local entrepreneur. He invested in small commercial ventures and gradually built financial stability. The income he earned from these early business efforts later helped him establish his first educational institutions.

Although he continued to manage certain business responsibilities, his primary focus shifted from commerce to institution-building and social development, using his business skills to plan, fund, and expand the Academy of Liberal Education and its network of institutions.

== Philanthropy ==
Kurunji Venkatramana Gowda was widely recognized for his strong commitment to public welfare and rural development. His philanthropic work was closely connected to his belief that education and healthcare should be accessible to all, especially people from rural and economically disadvantaged backgrounds.

== Awards and honours ==
Kurunji Venkataramana Gowda received several national and international recognitions for his contribution to education and rural development. His major honours include:

- Honorary Doctorate from Florida University, USA
- Rajiv Gandhi Ekta Award
- Glory of India Award
- Parisararatna Award
- Vikas Jyoti Award
- Indira Gandhi Sadbhavana Award
- Karnataka Sahitya Academy Award
- Priyadarshini Indira Gandhi Award.
