= Sulimalthe =

- Village
- Location in Karnataka, India
- Coordinates: 12.6°N 75.87°E
- Country: India
- State: Karnataka
- District: Kodagu
- Elevation: 1,027 m (3,369 ft)

Languages
  - Official: Kannada
- Time zone: UTC+5:30 (IST)

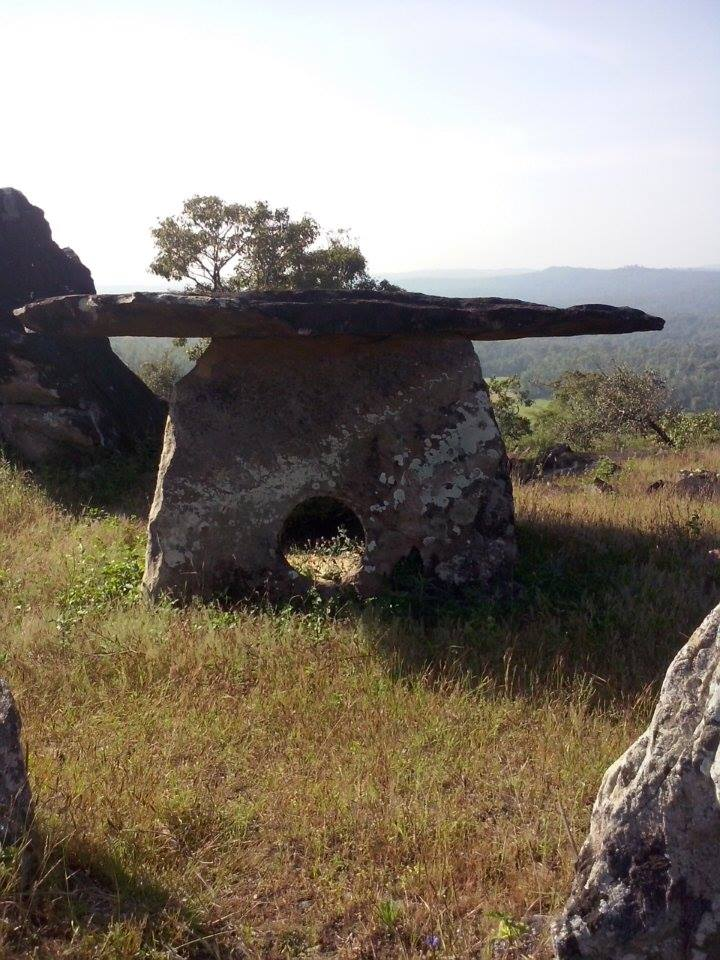
Dolmen circles, Sulimalthe, Somwarpet

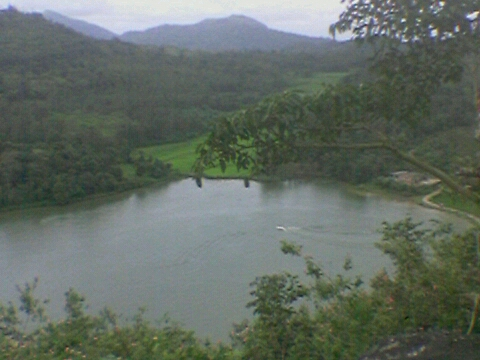
Honnamana Kere near Sulimalthe Village

Coorg Apples in Sulimalthe

Sulimalthe is a village in the Kodagu district of the Indian state of Karnataka.

== Geography ==
The village is located about 7 km away from the town of Somwarpet towards Shanivarsanthe. It lies between Doddamalthe and Habbali.

Various bird species are found in the surrounding coffee estates, such as woodpeckers and great white egrets.

Honnamana Kere (Honnamana Lake), a holy place and tourist site, is located in the village.

== Economy ==
The primary occupation is agriculture and the primary crop is coffee. The village is home to many coffee estates. Black pepper, cardamom, and bananas are also cultivated. Silver Oak trees are grown for shade in the coffee estates and harvested for lumber. Many varieties of citrus fruits are grown in the village, including oranges, limes and sweet limes.

A rare Coorg apple, similar to the European apple, is found in Sulimalthe.

== Languages spoken ==
Most of the village residents are Kannadigas, although languages including Kodava Takk, English, and Hindi are also spoken.

== See also ==
- Madikeri
- Somwarpet
- Mangalore
- Virajpet
