= Bellare, Dakshina Kannada =

Bellare Bellare
- Village
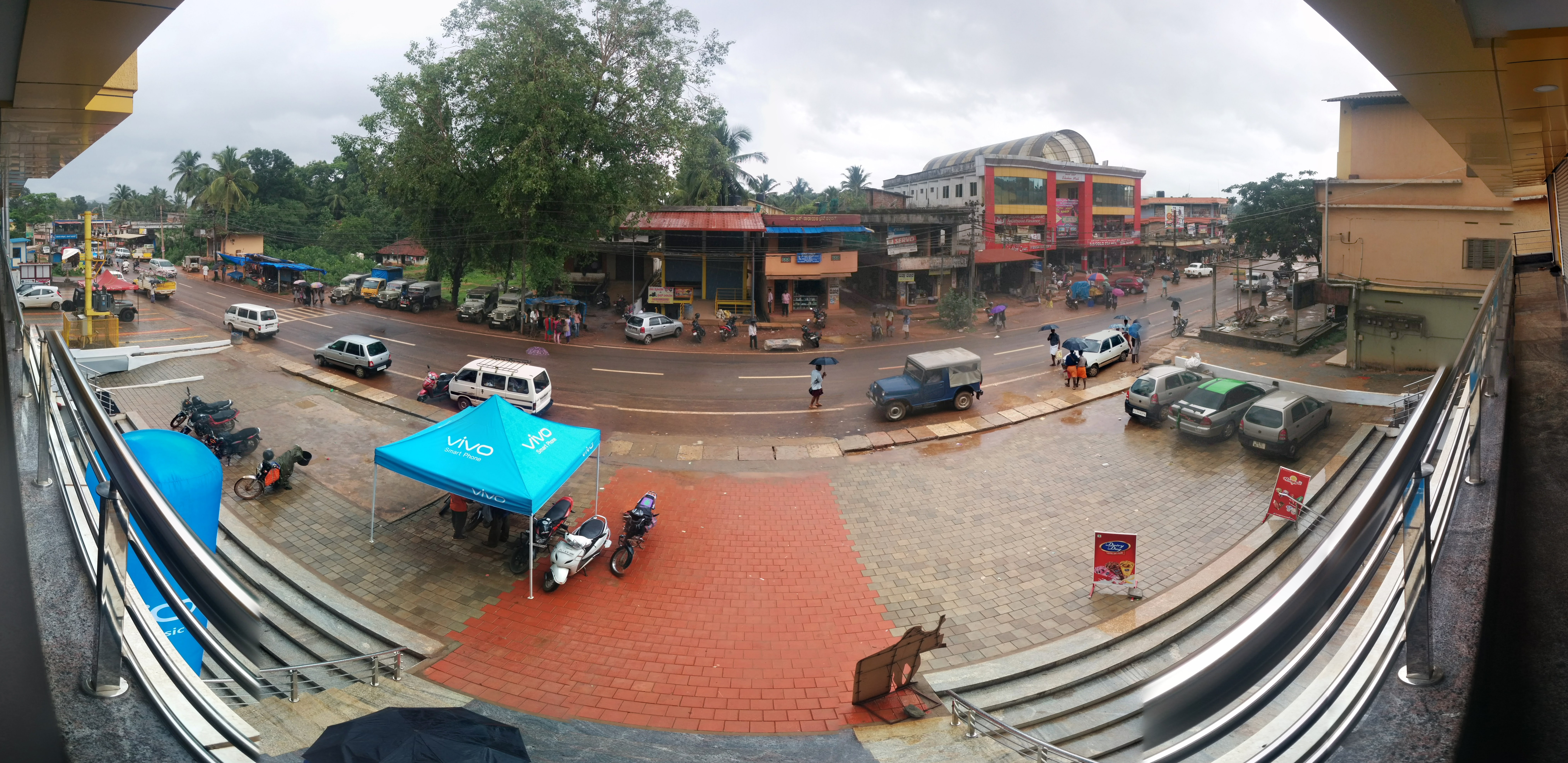

- Location in Karnataka, India Bellare (India)
- Coordinates: 12°40′N 75°22′E
- Country: India
- State: Karnataka
- District: Dakshina Kannada

Population (2011)Around 50,000 approx.
  - Total: 4,814

Languages
  - Official: Tulu, Kannada, Konkani,
- Time zone: UTC+5:30 (IST)
- 574212PIN: 574212
- Vehicle registration: KA 21
- Nearest city: Puttur, Sullia, Kukke Subramanya
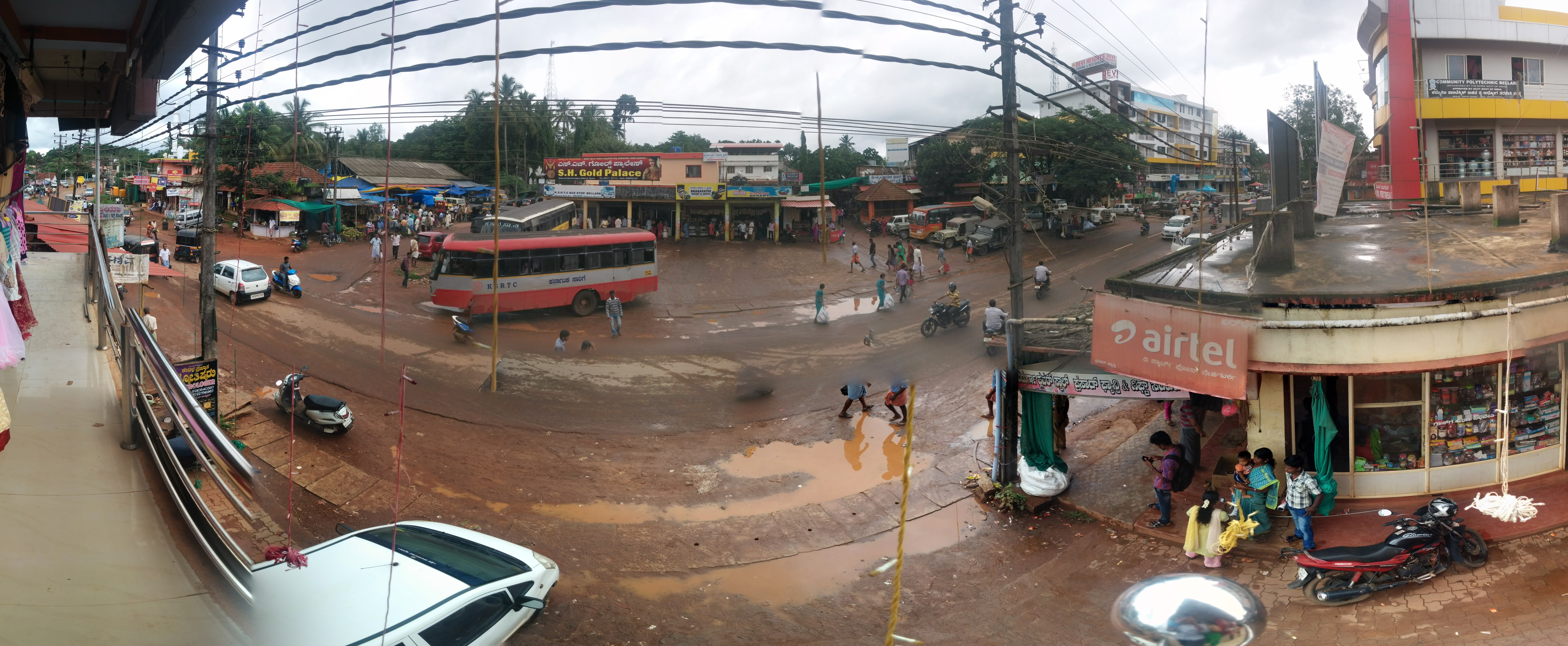
- Agriculture, Small Scale Industries, business center for connecting 3 town Puttur - Sullia - Subramania Bellare town bus stand

Bellare is a village located in the Sullia taluk of Dakshina Kannada district, Karnataka state, India.

== Educational institutions ==
- Govt primary school Bellare.
- Govt Higher primary school.
- Govt primary school Darkasthu.
- Govt Junior College.
- Shivramkarant Degree College, located near Bellare at Pervaje.
- Jnana ganga central school.
- Darul Hikma Education Centre

== Economic activities ==
1. Agriculture. The village has advanced agricultural developments in the field of plantation crops, consisting of areca nut (Mangalore chali), coconut, coco, vanilla, pepper, cashew nut and rubber.
2. Rubber processing factory

== Health care ==
- Govt primary health centre Bellare
- Anupama clinic
- SM Bhat clinic
- Ganesh clinic
- Vedamritha Chikitsalaya

== Climate ==
The average annual temperature is 34 °C. Summers are warm and humid, whereas during the monsoon season the village receives heavy rainfall, and cools by the year's end.

== Culture and arts ==
Pilgrimage and worship places

- Ajipila Mahalingeshwara Temple
- Shri Lakshmi venkatramana Temple
- Pervaje Jaladurga Devi Temple
- Muthu mariamman Temple, Darkasthu
- ZAKARIYA JUMA MASJID
- Holy Cross Church Bellare
