= Immadihalli =

Immadihalli Akshaya Tirupati
- village
- Location within Karnataka Location within India
- Coordinates: 12.5811°N 77.451°E
- Country: India
- State: Karnataka
- District: Bangalore

Languages
  - Official: Kannada
- Time zone: UTC+5:30 (IST)
- PIN: 560066
- Telephone code: 2845
- Vehicle registration: KA-53
- Coastline: 0 kilometres (0 mi)
- Nearest city: Bangalore

Immadihalli is a suburb situated in the Eastern periphery of Bangalore City and part of Whitefield township. Immadihalli was a part of the Varthur Legislative Assembly, but now belongs to the Bruhat Bengaluru Mahanagara Palike BBMP[1]. Immadihalli belongs to Mahadevapura Legislative Assembly in the state of Karnataka with effect from the year 2008. Immadihalli is very close to ITPL, which is heart of IT in Bangalore. Immadihalli belongs to a green belt area so there are no industries located in and around. Immadihalli was one of the largest milk producing villages in Bangalore.

At Immadihalli, people celebrate, Brahmarathotsava of Sri Venkataramana Swamy, Kalyanotsava in February and March. The event continues approximately 28 days. The people of Immadihalli and surrounding village people has constructed Sri Draupathamma (Draupadi) at Sri Dharmaraya Swamy ( Yudhishthira ) temple, near to Sri venkataramana Swamy and planning to celebrate karaga mahostava which happens in night being visited by thousands of people from Channasandra, Varthur, Harohalli, Gunjur, Whitefield, Ramagondannahalli, Balagere, Sorahunase, Nagondanahalli.

== History of Sri Venkataramana Swamy Temple ==
A few hundred years back the idol of Sri venkataramana Swamy was found in Sorahunase village in the agriculture land and same idol has been brought to immadihalli village and constructed temple.

in 2001 the old temple has been renovated with full granite stones with a new kalyana mantapa and a new gopura the construction of the new temple took nearly five years to complete. This village consist of many temples in which Karimariyamma & sapalamma temples are considered as the Gramadevathe, people celebrate Deepothsava in the month of June for this gramadhevathe.1182114. now it is government undertaking temple
