= ITI =

ITI or Iti may refer to:

== Companies ==
- Indian Telephone Industries Limited, manufacturer of telecommunications equipment in India
- ITI Group, a media group in Poland
- ITI Records, a jazz record label in Van Nuys, California

== Organizations ==
- Information Technology Industry Council, a U.S. trade association
- Institute of Translation and Interpreting, representing translators and interpreters in the U.K.
- International Tartan Index, database of the Scottish Tartans Authority
- International Theatre Institute, performing arts organization founded by UNESCO
- U.S.-ITI units and British-ITI units, Italian Army Service Units of World War II

== Schools ==
- Industrial training institute, a post-secondary school in India
- Information Technology Institute, a postgraduate career institute in Egypt
- Intercultural Theatre Institute, an actor-training school in Singapore
- International Theological Institute, a Catholic theological school in Austria

== Think tanks ==
- Information Trust Institute, at University of Illinois at Urbana-Champaign, studies information security
- Infrastructure Technology Institute, a transportation research center at Northwestern University
- International Telugu Institute, established by the Government of Andhra Pradesh in 1975

== Other uses ==
- Mount Iti, a mountain in Greece
- Iti (film), an Indian film
