= Dasari Venkataramana =

Dasari Venkata Ramana
- Born: Uyyalawada Village, Kurnool district, Andhra Pradesh
- Citizenship: Indian
- Education: Master of Arts in Telugu language
- Alma mater: Osmania University
- Occupations: Writer, Sub Registrar in Dept of Stamps and Registration
- Spouse: Lakshmidevi
- Children: Shravani, Saratchandra
- Writing career
- Language: Telugu language
- Genre: Children's literature
- Notable works: Amma Manasu (Mother's heart), Anandam (Bliss)
- Notable awards: Sahitya Akademi Award

Dasari Venkata Ramana, popular for his Chandamama style of story writing is an author hailing from Kurnool district, Andhra Pradesh. His genre of writing is mostly confined to children's literature. He has been awarded with Bala Sahitya Puraskar for Telugu language for the year 2014 from Sahitya Akademi, New Delhi. He has also been awarded Potti Sreeramulu Telugu University's annual literary award under Children's Literature category for the year 2006 (Awarded in 2007).
