= Ubaradka Mittur =

- village
- Location in Karnataka, India Ubaradka Mittur (India)
- Coordinates: 12.574322°N 75.438420°E
- Country: India
- State: Karnataka
- District: Dakshina Kannada
- Talukas: Sullia

Government
  - Body: Gram panchayat

Population (2001)
  - Total: 7,929

Languages
  - Official: Kannada
- Time zone: UTC+5:30 (IST)
- ISO 3166 code: IN-KA
- Vehicle registration: KA
- Website: karnataka.gov.in

Ubaradka Mittur is a village in the southern state of Karnataka, India. It is located in the Sullia taluk of Dakshina Kannada district in Karnataka.

== Demographics ==
- As of 2001 India census, Ubaradka Mittur had a population of 7,929 with 3,988 males and 3,941 females.
- Ubaradka Mittur Population Census 2011

Particulars	Total	Male	Female
Total No. of Houses	1,806	-	-
Population	8,229	4,131	4,098
Child (0-6)	834	424	410
Schedule Caste	821	402	419
Schedule Tribe	1,466	733	733
Literacy	85.15 %	90.45 %	79.83 %
Total Workers	3,868	2,517	1,351
Main Worker	3,731	4,351	0
Marginal Worker	137	48	89

== Small village ==
- Maduvegadde
- Huliyadka

== See also ==
- Mangalore
- Dakshina Kannada
- Districts of Karnataka
