= Kedambadi Ramaiah Gowda =

Indian freedom fighter

- Born: Sullia, Dakshina Kannada, Kingdom of Coorg
- Died: unknown
- Known for: Amara Sullia Rebellion
- Title: Zameendar

Kedambadi Ramaiah Gowda was an Indian freedom fighter and revolutionary who united the farmers from Sullia and led the Amara Sullia Rebellion in 1837. Ramaiah hoisted the native flag after lowering the Union Jack, which is known to be the first-ever freedom movement against the East India Company. He was banished by the British Raj in the aftermath of the rebellion.

== Early life ==
Kedambadi Ramaiah Gowda belonged to the Are Bhashe Community and was closely connected with Linga Rajendra II of Kingdom of Coorg. After Linga Rajendra II, his son Chikka Virarajendra also had good relations with Kedambadi Ramayya Gowda.

== Contributions to freedom struggle ==
Kedambadi Ramaiah Gowda opposed the payment of tax, tobacco and salt rules imposed by the British Raj, and set out from Ubaradka Mithoor in Sullia taluk on 30 March 1837 to start a revolt. Ramaiah motivated many rulers to join his rebellion against the British Raj. Ramaiah's army (primarily consisting farmers of the Dakshina Kannada district), succeeded in defeating the British army. They lowered the Union Flag before hoisting the Jangama flag in Bavutagudda on 5 April 1837. The Amara Sullia Rebellion was crushed by the British army thirteen days after hoisting the Flag. The Peasant fighters could not save Mangalore. Many leaders were hanged to death in public in Bikkuru Nayagara Katte later infamously known as Beekara Rana Katte(Bikaranakatte). The bodies were not handed over to relatives but were left to rot and eaten by eagles, in Bavutagudda (in present day Mangalore), on 5 April 1837. Kedambadi Ramaiah Gowda, his son Sanaiah Gowda and few other freedom fighters like Kukkunoor Chennaiah were banished by the British Raj to other colonies like Singapore and Burma.

== Legacy ==
A 22 feet (6.7 m) tall bronze statue, named as "Statue of Gallantry" of Kedambadi Ramaiah Gowda was built at Bautagudda, in Mangalore as a tribute to his role in the freedom struggle.
