= KVG College of Engineering =

K.V.G. College of Engineering
- Other name: K.V.G.C.E.
- Motto: Technology for Mankind
- Type: Government Aided
- Established: 1986
- Affiliations: Visvesvaraya Technological University
- President: Dr. Kurunji Venkatramana Gowda
- Principal: Dr. Suresha V
- Administrative staff: 300
- Undergraduates: 1500
- Postgraduates: 150
- Location: Sullia, Karnataka, India; 12°33′29″N 75°23′21″E
- Website: www.kvgengg.com

K.V.G. College of Engineering, Sullia (KVGCE) is an engineering college located in Sullia, Dakshina Kannada, Karnataka. The institution offers undergraduate and postgraduate engineering programs and focuses on technical education, practical learning, innovation, and overall student development. It provides students with opportunities to participate in projects, hackathons, technical events, and industry-oriented activities.Institution was established in 1986 under the leadership of Founder President Late Dr.Kurunji Venkatramana Gowda(KVG).

== History ==
K.V.G. College of Engineering sponsored by Academy of Liberal Education (R) Sullia D. K. is located in Kurunjibhag and is one of the largest mega educational complexes in India.

KVG group of institutions have many reputed colleges as

KVG Medical College & Hospital,KVG Institute of Physiotherapy,KVG Institute of Nursing Sciences,KVG College of Engineering,KVG ITI,KVG Dental College & Hospital,KVG Polytechnic,KVG NMC,KVG NMPUC,KVG IPS,KVG Amarajyothi Pre University College,KVG LAW college,KVG Ayurveda Medical College,NSVK Dental College & Hospital,NSVK Polytechnic,KVG ITI Bhagamandala,KVG Institute of allied health sciences

== Admission ==
Students are admitted to undergraduate courses on basis of their merit in the Karnataka CET test, or in the COMED-K undergraduate test. Students are also admitted through a management quota, which places no merit requirement; students are directly admitted to a course upon the orders of the college management (in this case, the managing trust). There is a lateral entry scheme in place, by which students holding diploma degrees can enter directly to the second year of study in engineering. Students, upon graduating, receive a Bachelor of Engineering. The total undergraduate strength allotted to the college is 300 per year.

Students are admitted to postgraduate courses on basis of their GATE test scores, as well as on their Post Graduate Karnataka CET scores. Students, upon graduating receive a Master of Technology(MTech), Master of Business Administration(MBA) degree. The total postgraduate strength allotted to the college is 150.

== Departments and courses ==
=== Undergraduate ===
These departments offer four-year undergraduate courses in engineering. All of the undergraduate courses have been conferred government aided college status by the Visvesvaraya Technological University, Belgavi

==== Bachelor of Engineering ====
List of under graduate programs offered at KVGCE

- Bachelor of Engineering in Civil Engineering
- Bachelor of Engineering in Computer Science & Engineering
- Bachelor of Engineering in CS&E(Artificial Intelligence & Machine learning)
- Bachelor of Engineering in Electronics & Communication Engineering
- Bachelor of Engineering in Mechanical Engineering

The allied departments of the college are the departments of Physics, Chemistry, Mathematics, Humanities, and TAP

=== Postgraduate courses ===
Postgraduate courses offered by the college are not autonomous, and they remain fully under the ambit of the university.

==== Master of Technology (MTech) ====
The Institute offers 2-year Master of Technology (MTech) in the following Branches.

- Digital Communication
- Digital Electronics And Communication
- Software Engineering
- Computer Engineering
- Manufacturing Science & Engineering
- Computer Application in Industrial Drives

==== MBA ====
KVGCE also offers 2-year Master of Business Administration(MBA) Program.

== Activities ==
The institute organizes co-curricular and extra curricular activities. Some informal student groups include

- Organize Blood donation camps every year.
- NSS - National Service Scheme
- RISE - Representatives of Information Science & Engineering.

== Clubs ==
- Cognex AI
- Ignite Club
- KVGCEOSC
- Lynx AI
- Sphere Hive
- Iris Club
- Vayujit Racing Club
- Spectra
- Cultural Club
