= Siddavesa =

Folk dance

Siddavesa is a type of religious and traditional folk dance. The Arebhahse people of Sullia perform this dance during the full moon in the month of Suggi on the Tulu calendar. During this month, Suggi Nalike is also performed. Siddavesha performances take place from late evening until morning, with the dancers visiting the homes of people from all social strata.

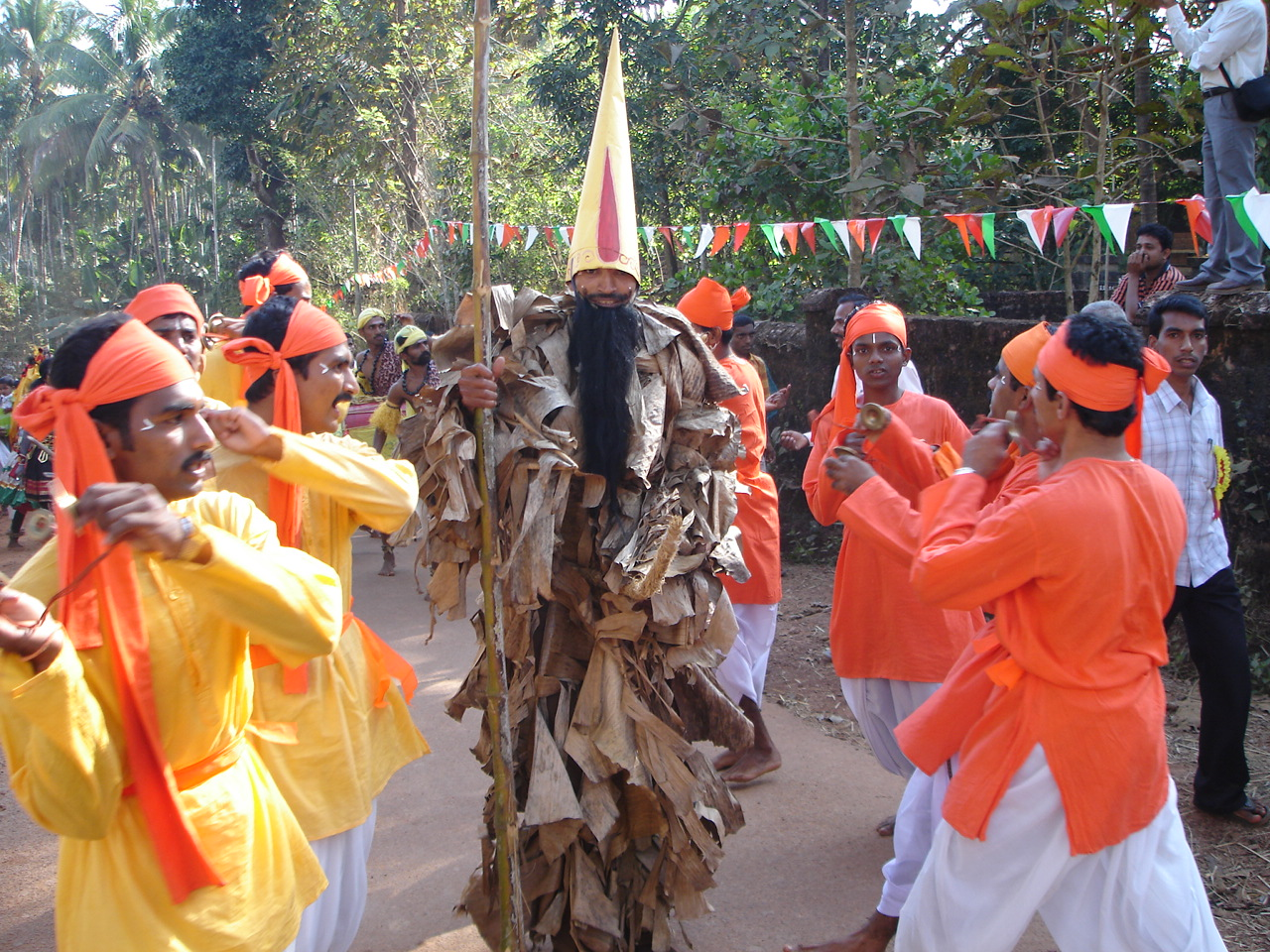
Siddhavesha

== Description ==
The Siddavesa is influenced by the Natha Pantha. It involves an all-night performance that includes mythological mimicry, acting, singing, and dancing. Participants in the Siddavesha embody different characters, interacting with each other and the public throughout various stages of the enactment. The three main mythical farce characters in Siddavesha are Sanyasi, Bhatru, and Dasayye.

== Dress and costume ==
Several different characters are portrayed in the Siddavesa performance, including Dasayya, Bhatru, Sansyasi, Koraga, Koti Chennaya, Beetle Purbu, Byari, and Piliyesa, among others.

Dasayya appears in a white dhoti and red shawl, holding a conch and drum. His head is covered by a Mundasu, and a long nama is marked on his forehead.

Bhatru, the village priest, wears a sacred thread (janivara) with a large knot, a white dhoti, and smears his body with sandalwood paste, applying sandal paste and kunkum to his forehead.

Sanyasi, the central figure in this mythical dance, wears an unusual outfit made of dried camouflage leaves. He carries a large, symbolic phallus made of 4-5 wooden sticks tied together, protruding from his waist.

Koraga covers his entire body with dark paint.

Byari wears a white banyan, a multicolored checked dhoti tied slightly above the waist to avoid touching the ground, and a traditional hat (toppi).

== Performance ==
After sunset, the performing artists gather at a pre-decided holy place, typically in front of the Daivradhane Chavadi or Guttu house. They dress in locally available costumes after conducting prayers, during which the eldest members of the group pray to Kadri Manjunatha, local spirits, and ancestors. The group then moves from house to house within their region, performing in each courtyard. A lamp is lit at the center of the performance area or near the Tuḷasi Kaṭṭe.

When the team arrives at the house for their first performance, they send the Sanyasi into hiding beside the house. The rest of the group walks into the courtyard and wakes up the residents. They set up a lit lamp in the center of the courtyard and begin dancing around it, with one member initiating the song as follows:

Sidduliṅga mudduliṅga - sid'dhavēsō.
Nāvu yāvūru yāva taḷa - sid'dhavēsō.
Nāvu kāśīya taḷadavru - sid'dhavēsō

All the performers act according to their roles, which are predetermined by the head of the team, usually the eldest member. The Sanyasi is left alone on stage during the Siddavesa performance, roaming around the courtyard while holding his symbolic phallus made of 4-5 wooden sticks tied together. He uses unusual and provocative language.

As they walk down the street, they loudly chant "Ḍimbisāle, Ḍimbisāle." This indicates that the Siddavesa performers are on their way to the house.

== Belief ==
If Chennu Nalike, performed by the Mera community, accidentally encounters Siddavesa on the way, it is considered a bad omen. Therefore, Siddavesa performers always chant "Ḍimbisāle" loudly as they move from home to home.
