= Tulu Gowda =

Community in South-Western India

10 Kutumba 18 Gothra

Regions with significant populations
- Dakshina Kannada, Kodagu, Kasaragod and Udupi
- Dakshina Kannada: 300,000
- Kodagu: 150,000

Languages
- Tulu, Arebhashe

Religion
- Hinduism

Tulu Gowda and Arebhashe Gowda are a community primarily found in South Canara District, Kodagu District (Coorg), Indian state of Karnataka and Bandadka village of Kasaragod. They are officially considered a subsect of the Vokkaliga community but are culturally and linguistically different. They speak Tulu and Arebhashe.

== History ==
They were originally called Natha Pantha and Shaivas, owing allegiance to Sringeri Matha. During Emperor Vishnuvardhana’s rule, they became Vaishnavites and worshiped Tirupati Venkataramana (Balaji of Tirupati) and Sabbakka (Sharada of Sringeri). They then settled in the Mangalore-Udupi (Dakshina Kannada-Udupi) region where they spoke the Tulu language. They are said to have 10 Kutumba and 18 Bari as their primordial root families, from which a Nūru Mane or "hundred families" arose. They then migrated to Coorg (Kodagu) from the Mangalore-Udupi (Dakshina Kannada-Udupi) region, to settle among the Canarese (Kannada) speaking peoples.

== Community system ==
They have a somewhat elaborate system of caste government. In every village there are two headmen, the Grāma Gowda and the ottu Gauda. For every group of eight or nine villages there is another head called the Māganē Gauda, and for every nine Māganēs there is a yet higher authority called the Kattēmanēyava.

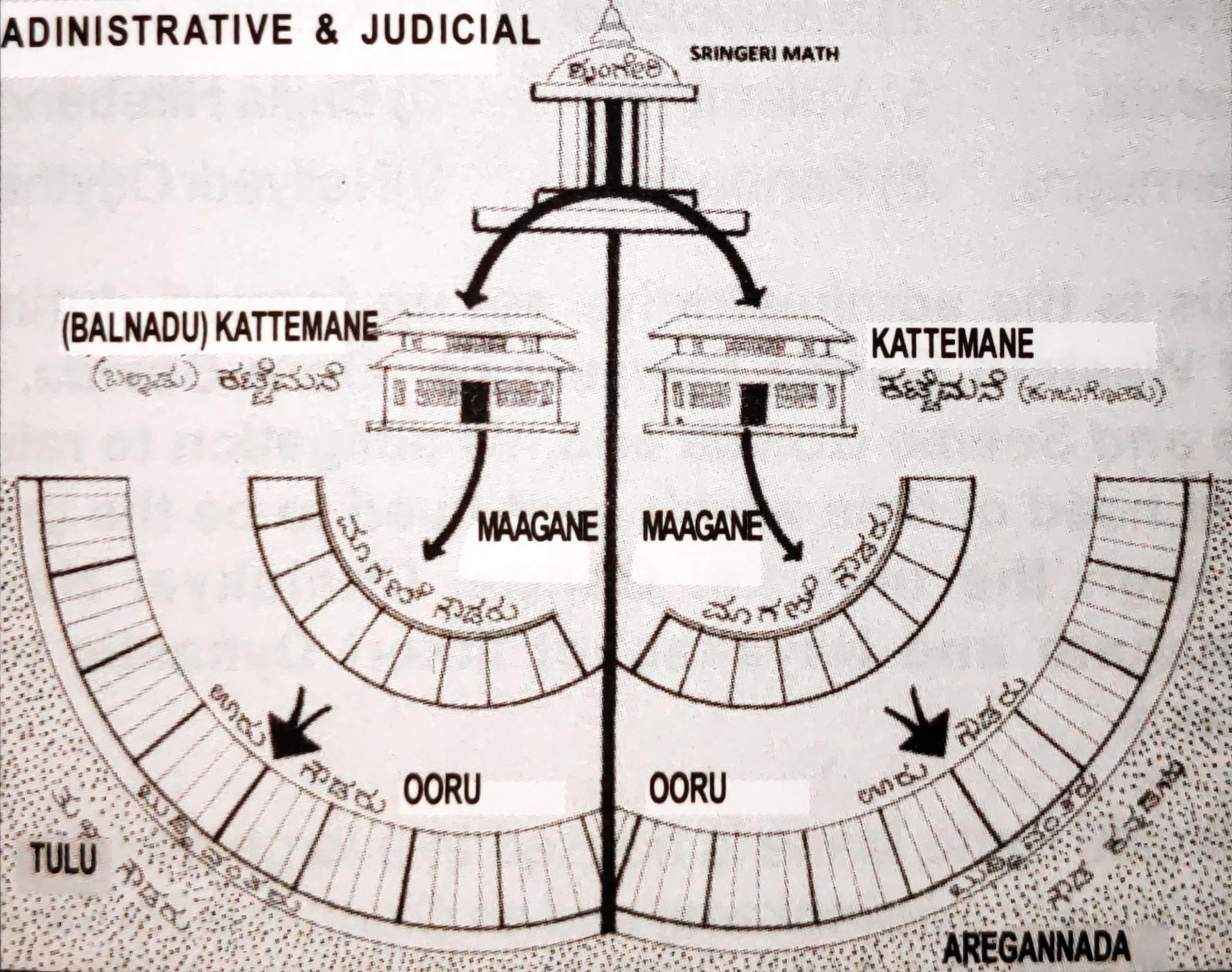
Administrative and judicial setup

== Domestic culture ==
=== Marriage system ===
Sobane Song sung while doing marriage

The caste is divided into eighteen baris or balis, which are of the usual exogamous character, same bari men, women not to marry, they belong to close cousins.

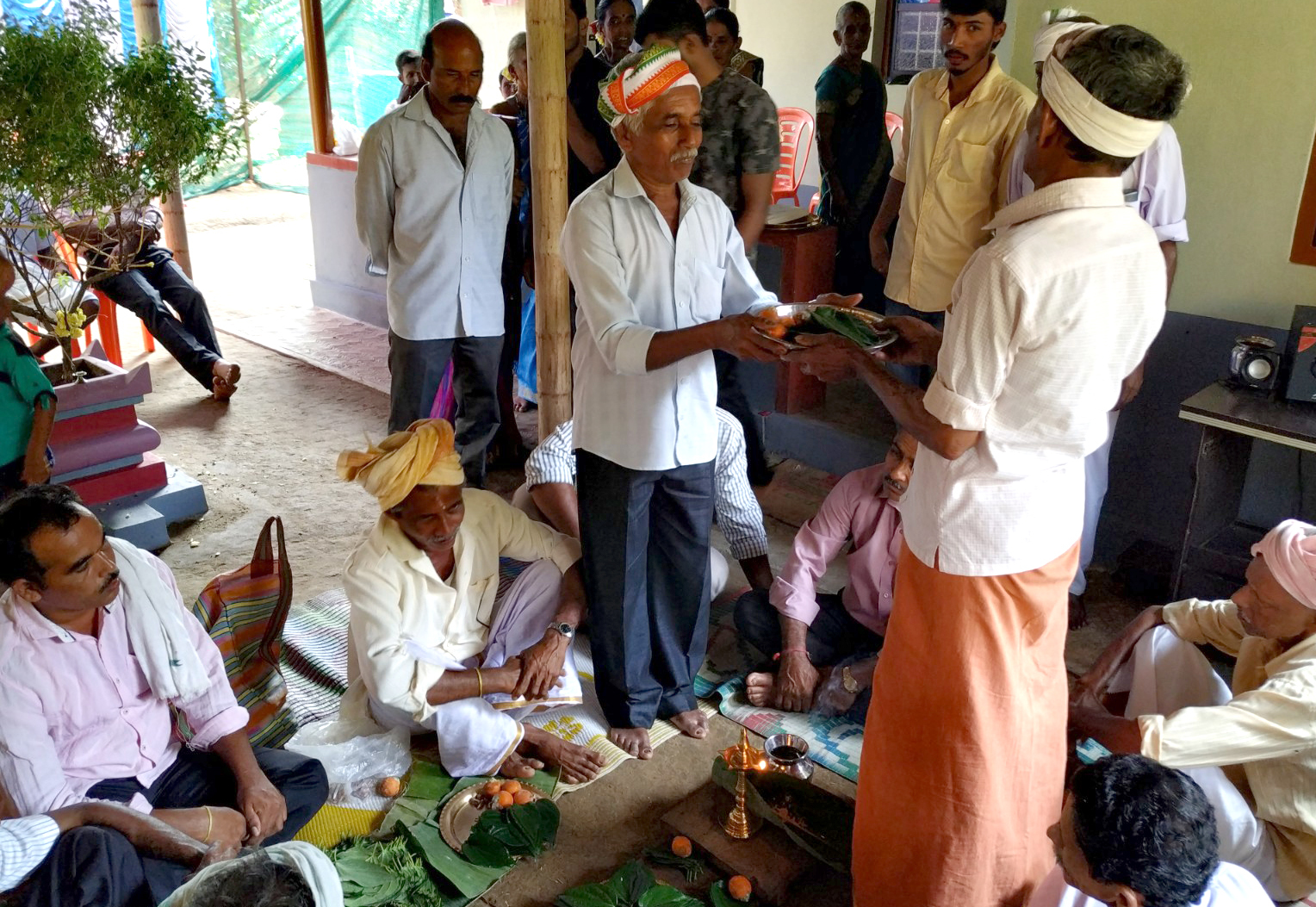
Tulu Gowda Marriage Program – Vīḷya śāstra at Puttur

In Dakshina Kannada both the groups of Gowdas Tulu and 'Arebhashe' prepare meat or any Non Vegetarian food during marriage and Gruhaprevesha (House warming functions. Tulu Gowdas of Puttur Seeme invariably conduct Marriage and Gruha Pravesha as per Vaidhika Practice.

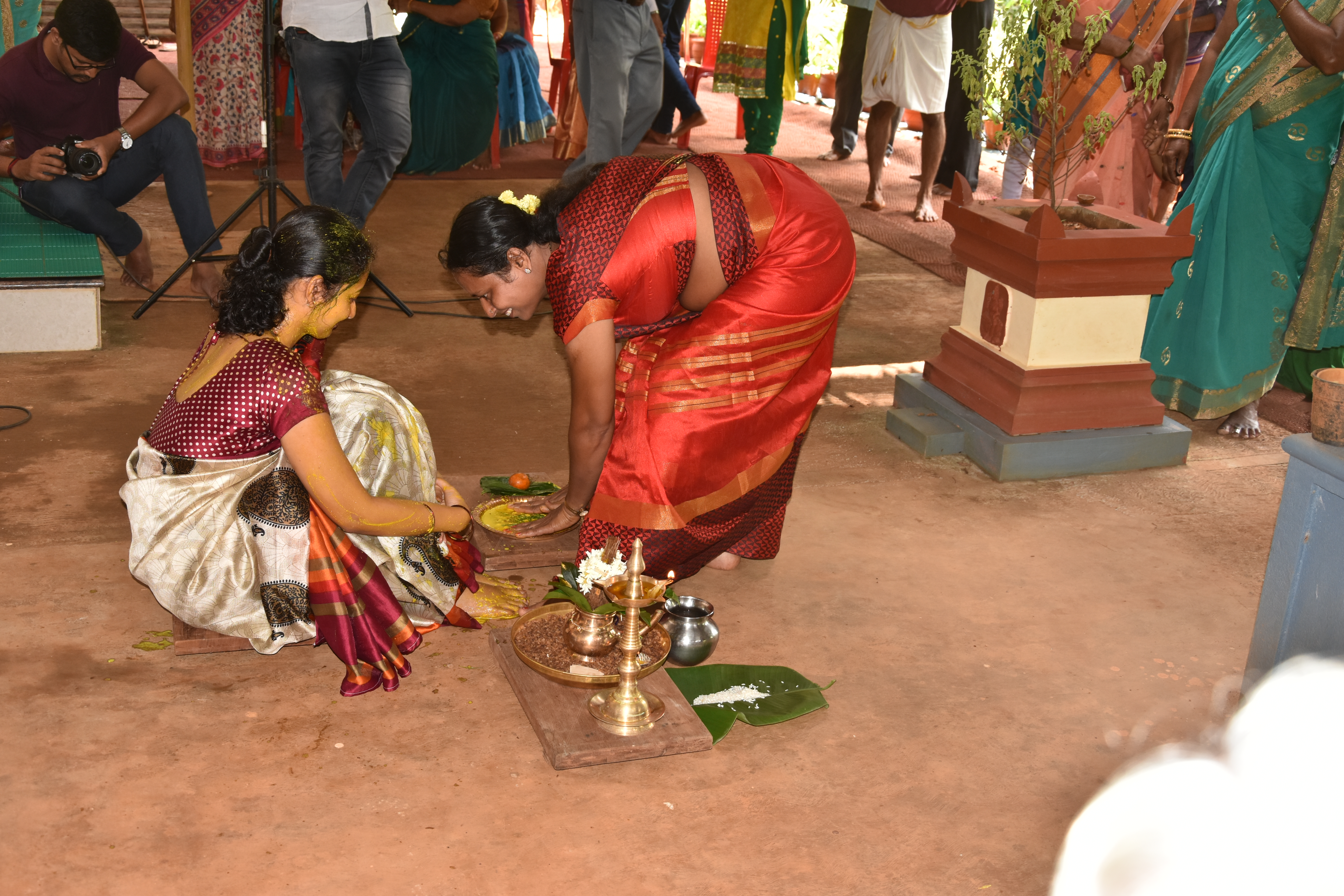
Madrrangi Shastra of Gowda Culture

At the time of Marriage, bridegroom's father offers ₹10¼ to the girls parents out of this ₹6¼ is to be sent to Gurumaṭha (Sringeri Matha) through Ūra gauḍa for Girls Mutheidegu (for seeking longer life for the couple). Oora Gowda thus collects such offering during the Marriages held under his jurisdiction and hands over the same to Maagane Gowda and through him to Kattemane. Kattemane Gowda takes it over to Guru Matha (Sringeri Matha) once in a year and seeks blessings from Maṭhādhipati on behalf of married couple. Oora Gowda occupies an important position in all JEEVANAVARTHANA PRACTICES of Tulu Gowdas of Puttur region. In his absence Othu Gowda takes over his responsibility. Gowdas follow Patrilineal succession procedure. Eldest male member in the Joint family is the Head of the family. Ūra gauḍa of the village is nominated by Kattemane Head. In all functions starting from "Veelya Shastra" (Engagement) up to the marriage the Ūra gauḍa recites an Invocation and Declaration in loud voice which states as

Transliteration in Tulu

Bāṇḍavereḍelā, Aramanetagaleḍēla, Gurumanetagleḍelā, patt kuṭumo padnenmo barita banduleḍlā, kaṭṭemanetāgleḍlā, māgane ill tāgleḍlā, ūra gauḍrerḍlā, itn̄cina binnereḍlā, battinan̄cina binneḍlā kēnondu baṅgēra bidara (anana purdar) panpi anagalā, nandere baritā (ponnana pudar) ponnaglā tāḷi kaṭṭubō panper.

In English

People of Royalty (Ikkeri), People of Guru Matha (Sringeri Math), Relatives from ten original families and eighteen Gothras of Gowdas, Kattemane (Seeme) Gowdare, Maagane mane (Nada) gowdare, Oora gowdare (Village Head), Relatives of this village, Guest relatives who gathered from distance places we take your permission for the (Name of Boy) from Nander Bali to tie the Mangala soothra to the (Name of the Girl) from Bangera Bali.

At this moment the gathered relatives and public will declare their assent saying "Edde Karyo Panpere" (a good work ritual). This Declaration is the same as the recital in Sullia and Kodagu region which is in Kannada. Here the reference to "Aramane and Gurumane" is essentially to royalty of Ikkeri and Sringeri Mathadhipathies respectively.

Generally, there is no 'Dowry' system among Gowda clan on the other hand Boys father offers a Kanya shulka to the girls' parents a sum of ₹16¼.

=== Bari Paddati ===
The caste is divided into eighteen baris or balis, which are of the usual exogamous character. The names of some of these are as follows: Bangāra (gold), Nandara, Malāra (a bundle of glass bangles, as carried about for sale), Sālu, Hemmana (pride or conceit), Kabru, Gōli (Portulaca oleracea, a pot-herb), Basruvōgaru (basru, belly), Balasanna, Kabar, Gundana, Chalyera, Mulyera, Nayera and Karbannāya.

== Arsaya ==
Once a year, mostly in the Tulu month of Kaarthel (June–July), the Gowdas perform a ceremony for the propitiation of all deceased ancestors. They have a special preference for Venkatarāmaswāmi, to whom they make money offerings once a year in September. It should reach Tirupati as an offering, which mostly includes coins, pepper, rupee notes.

== Indian Freedom movement ==
The Arebhashe Gowdas and Tulu Gowdas were historically involved in a rebellion against British rule in Canara. Kedambadi Ramaiah Gowda from Sulya rebelled against the British and hoisted Jangama (Lingayite monk) Kalyanaswamy's flag in Bavuta Gudde in Mangalore and ruled for 13 days. This was one of the earliest Indian independence struggles against British rule 1834.
