= Sadananda Gowda =

Indian politician (born 1953)

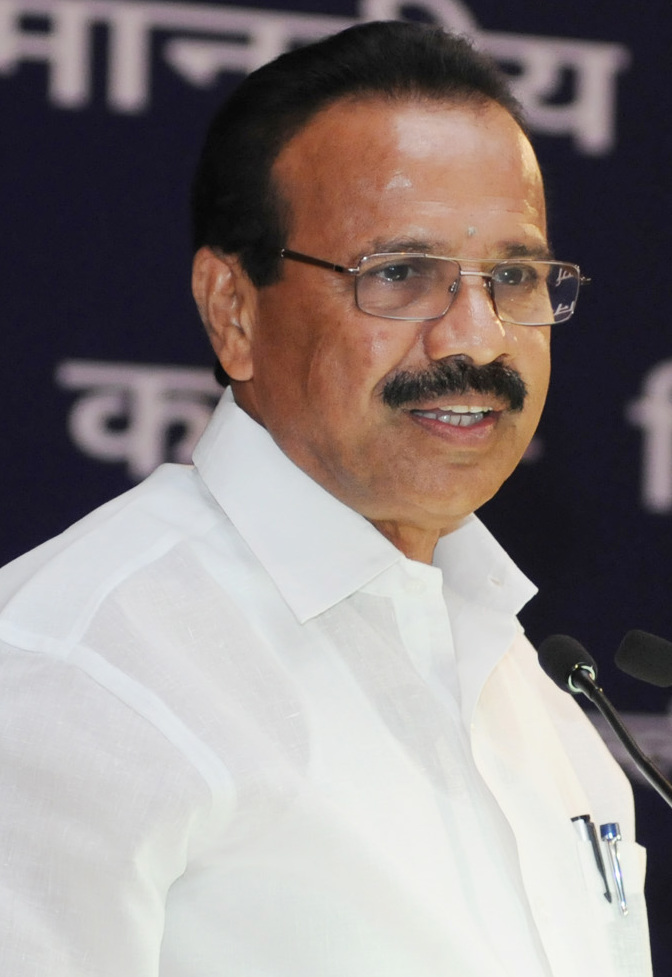

Union Minister of Chemicals and Fertilizers
- In office 14 November 2018 – 7 July 2021
- Prime Minister: Narendra Modi
- Preceded by: Ananth Kumar
- Succeeded by: Mansukh L. Mandaviya

Union Minister of Statistics and Programme Implementation
- In office 5 July 2016 – 24 May 2019
- Prime Minister: Narendra Modi
- Preceded by: V. K. Singh
- Succeeded by: Rao Inderjit Singh

Union Minister of Law and Justice
- In office 9 November 2014 – 5 July 2016
- Prime Minister: Narendra Modi
- Preceded by: Ravi Shankar Prasad
- Succeeded by: Ravi Shankar Prasad

Union Minister of Railways
- In office 26 May 2014 – 9 November 2014
- Prime Minister: Narendra Modi
- Preceded by: Mallikarjun Kharge
- Succeeded by: Suresh Prabhakar Prabhu

Member of Parliament, Lok Sabha
- In office 16 May 2014 – 4 June 2024
- Preceded by: D. B. Chandre Gowda
- Succeeded by: Shobha Karandlaje
- Constituency: Bangalore North, Karnataka
- Majority: 147,518 (9.4%)
- In office 22 May 2009 – 4 August 2011
- Preceded by: Constituency established
- Succeeded by: K. Jayaprakash Hegde
- Constituency: Udupi-Chikmagalur, Karnataka
- Majority: 27,018 (3.2%)
- In office 17 May 2004 – 16 May 2009
- Preceded by: V. Dhananjay Kumar
- Succeeded by: Constituency abolished
- Constituency: Mangalore, Karnataka
- Majority: 33,415 (4.2%)

Leader of the Opposition in Karnataka Legislative Council
- In office 23 May 2013 – 26 May 2014
- Preceded by: S. R. Patil
- Succeeded by: K. S. Eshwarappa

14th Chief Minister of Karnataka
- In office 4 August 2011 – 11 July 2012
- Preceded by: B. S. Yeddyurappa
- Succeeded by: Jagadish Shettar

President of Bharatiya Janata Party, Karnataka
- In office 2006–2010
- Preceded by: Jagadish Shettar
- Succeeded by: K. S. Eshwarappa

Member of Karnataka Legislative Assembly
- In office 1994–2004
- Preceded by: Vinay Kumar Sorake
- Succeeded by: Shakunthala T. Shetty
- Constituency: Puttur

Personal details
- Born: Devaragunda Venkappa Sadananda Gowda; 18 March 1953 (age 73) Mandekolu, Madras State, India
- Party: Bharatiya Janata Party
- Spouse: Datty Sadananda (m. 1981)
- Children: 2
- Education: St. Philomena's College, Puttur; Vaikunta Baliga College of Law

Devaragunda Venkappa Sadananda Gowda (born 18 March 1953) is an Indian politician who served as the Union Minister of Chemicals and Fertilizers of India in the Second Modi ministry from 14 November 2018 to 7 July 2021. He also served as the Minister of Statistics and Programme Implementation of India from 5 July 2016 to 24 May 2019 in the First Modi ministry. He has represented the Bangalore North constituency in the parliament from 2014 to 2024. He also held Ministry of Railways and other cabinet positions in the First Modi ministry. He also served as the 14th Chief Minister of Karnataka.

He previously served as the Minister of Law and Justice, having been shifted from the Ministry of Railways in the cabinet reshuffle of 5 July 2016. At the end of the previous Lok Sabha, he was the Minister of Statistics and Program Implementation. He then stepped down from his post of Minister of Chemicals and Fertilizers ahead of the cabinet reshuffle in July 2021.

== Early life ==
Sadananda Gowda was born in a Arebhashe Gowda family of Venkappa Gowda and Kamala in Mandekolu village of Sulya taluk in Karnataka. Gowda graduated in Science from Saint Philomena College, Puttur and went on to obtain his degree in law at Udupi's Vaikunta Baliga College of Law. He became active in student politics during this period and was elected General Secretary of the Students Union of the Law College. Subsequently, he became the District General Secretary of the Akhil Bharatiya Vidyarthi Parishad.

In 1976, he started practising law at both Sulya and Puttur. He was a public prosecutor for a brief period at Sirsi in the District of Uttara Kannada but resigned from his position to concentrate on his political career. Sadananda Gowda has served in the Co-operative Movement in Karnataka in various capacities:

- Vice-president of SCDCC Bank, Mangalore
- Director, SKACM Society, Mangalore
- Director, CAMPCO, Mangalore (1991–94)
- President, Mandekolu S.C.Society, Mandekolu, Sullia
- Member, State PLD Bank staff Selection Committee (1989–90)

Sadananda Gowda has worked for the labour movement being the General Secretary of Bharatiya Mazdoor Sangh, Puttur Division and President of Sullia Taluk Auto Rickshaw Drivers and Owners Union.

== Political career ==
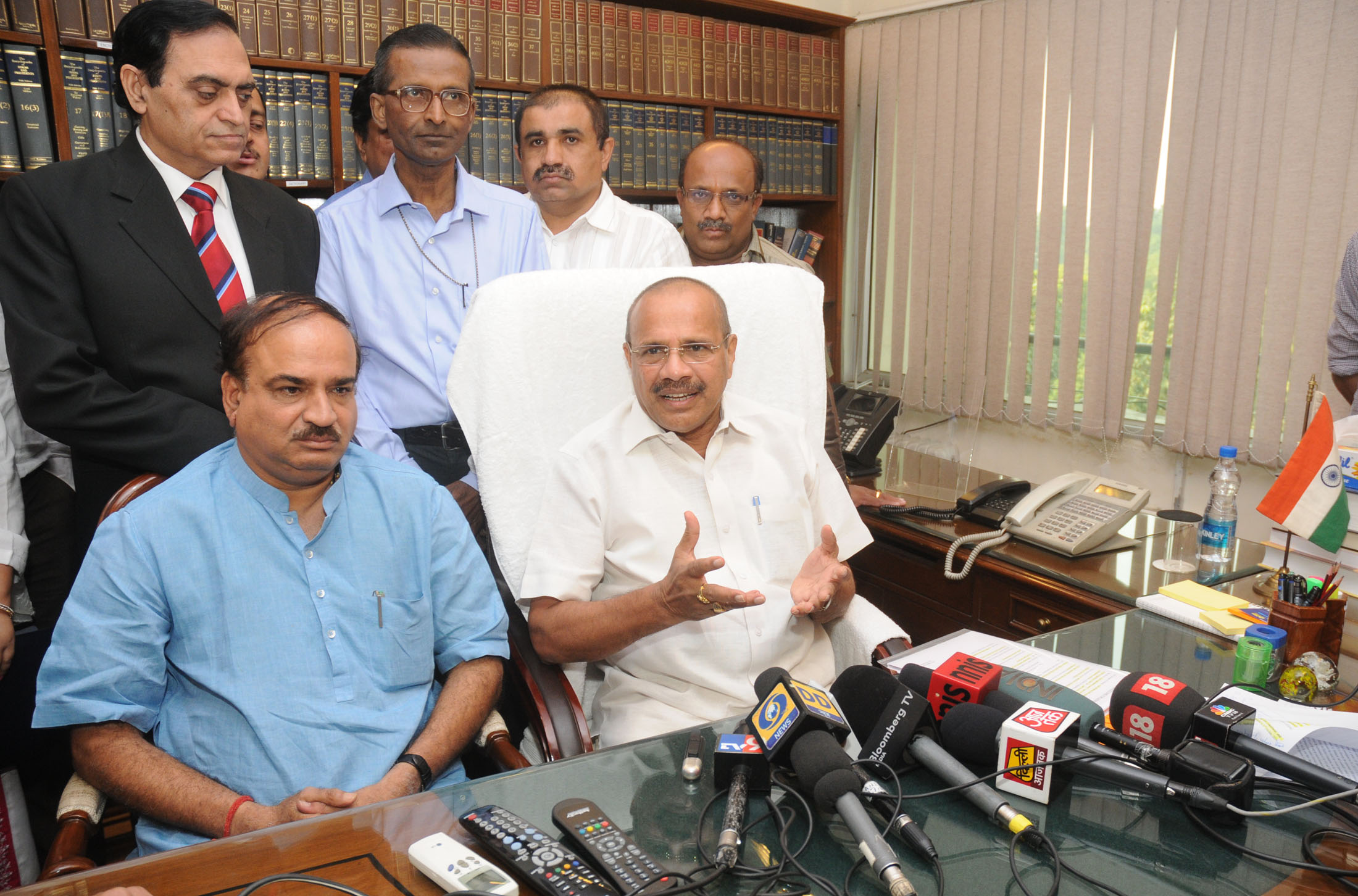
D.V. Sadananda Gowda taking charge as the Union Minister for Law & Justice, in New Delhi on 10 November 2014.

He began his political career as a member of the Jan Sangh. He was President of the party's Sulya Assembly segment. After the split of the Janata Party, he became a member of the BJP. Later on, he served the BJP as Dakshina Kannada BJP Yuva Morcha President, Dakshina Kannada BJP Vice-president, State BJP Yuva Morcha Secretary (1983–88), State BJP Secretary (2003–04) and National Secretary of the party (2004).

=== Karnataka Legislative Assembly ===
Sadananda Gowda was elected to the Karnataka Legislative Assembly in 1994 and 1999 from the Puttur Assembly seat in Dakshina Kannada. He became Deputy Leader of the Opposition in his second term as MLA. He has served in various committees of the Karnataka State legislature including the Cell for preparing Draft Bill on prohibiting Atrocities on Women, Karnataka, the Committee of Energy, Fuel, and Power, and the Committee for Public Undertaking. He was nominated as the President of the Public Accounts Committee in 2003.

=== Lok Sabha ===
He was elected to the 14th Lok Sabha in 2004 from the Mangalore Lok Sabha seat, defeating Veerappa Moily of the Indian National Congress by a margin of 32,314 votes. In 2009, the party shifted him to the Udupi-Chikmagalur constituency. In parliament, he was on the Committee on Science & Technology, Environment & Forests. In the 14th Lok Sabha, he was a member of the Committee on Commerce. The Government of India had appointed him as Director of Coffee Board during January 2005.

In 2006, Sadananda Gowda was appointed President of Karnataka State BJP. He earned national prominence being the President when BJP won an assembly election for the first time in South India in May 2008.

He was elected to the 15th Lok Sabha from Udupi Chikmagalur Constituency before he became the Chief Minister of Karnataka.

=== Chief Minister of Karnataka ===
Sadananda Gowda was chosen as the Chief Minister of Karnataka in August 2011 following the resignation of his mentor B.S. Yeddyurappa in an illegal mining case. Handpicked by Yeddyurappa, he was the first ethnic Arebhashe Gowda Chief Minister of Karnataka. As Chief Minister, he strived hard to improve the image of his party that had been tarnished due to allegations of corruption. He introduced various schemes such as Sakaala, aimed at providing time-bound services at government offices. But within a few months of becoming Chief Minister, he fell out with Yeddyurappa and was unable to unite the various factions of the party. In July 2012, he was asked to resign to make way for Jagadish Shettar when dissident activities in the party peaked.

After suffering a big loss in the May 2013 elections, BJP elected DV Sadananda Gowda as the opposition leader of legislative council in Karnataka.

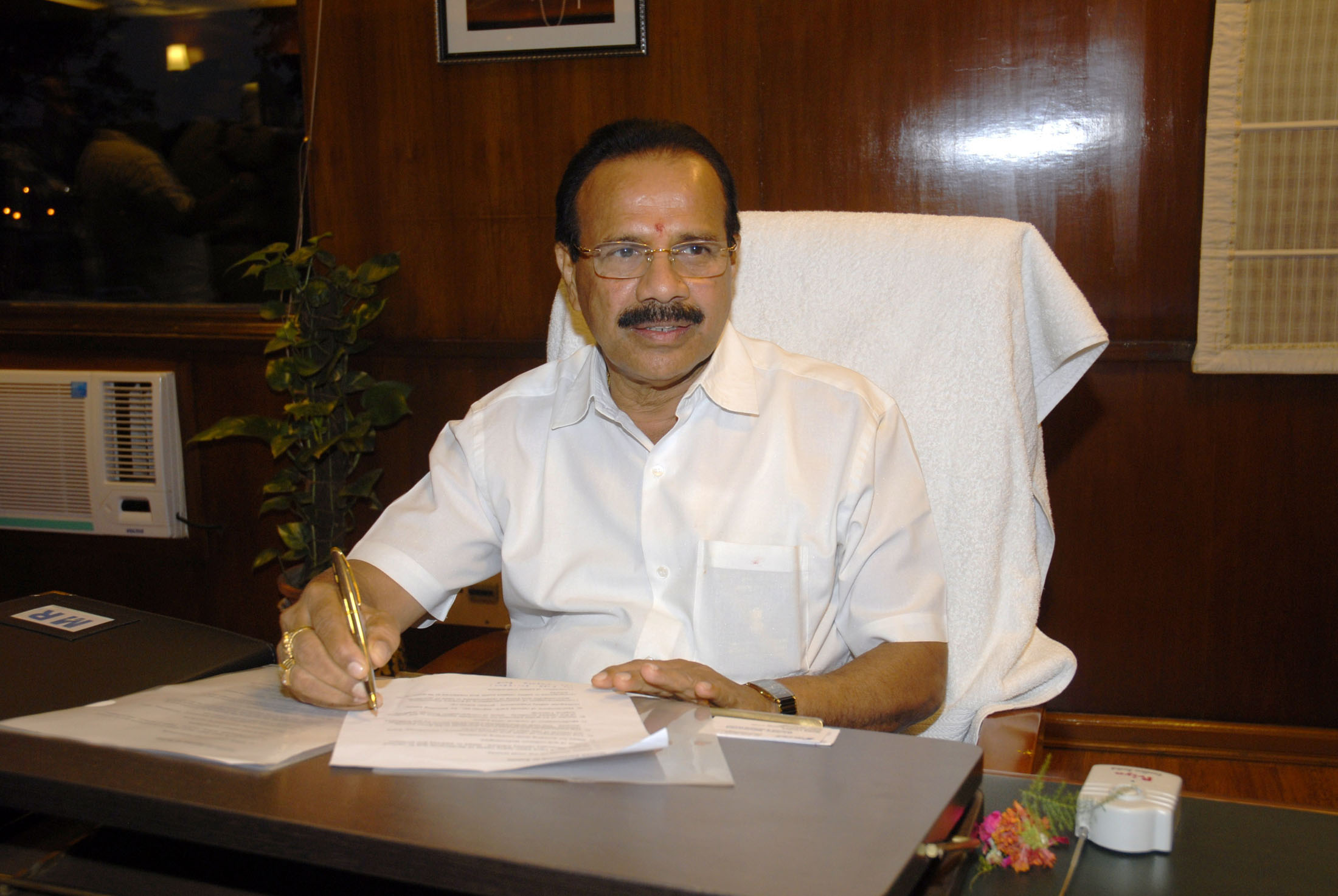
D.V. Sadananda Gowda taking charge as the Union Minister for Railways, in New Delhi on 27 May 2014

On 26 May 2014, Sadananda Gowda was sworn in as a cabinet minister in Prime Minister Narendra Modi's newly elected government. He was put in charge of the Ministry of Railways. He presented his maiden budget on 8 July 2014.

=== Cabinet minister in Modi's second term government ===
On 30 May 2019, Sadananda Gowda was sworn in as a cabinet minister in Prime Minister Narendra Modi's second term government. He was put in charge of the Ministry of Chemicals and Fertilizers. He then stepped down from his post of Minister of Chemicals and Fertilizers as directed by the prime minister ahead of the cabinet reshuffle in July 2021.

=== Accusations ===
As part of the #Metoo movement, a former BJP Mahila Morcha member accused Gowda in 2018 of inappropriately behaving with her when Gowda was Karnataka's chief minister. She claimed that Gowda would constantly call her and invite her to meet him at his office and have lunch with him. She also claimed that Gowda touched her body parts and attempted to make physical contact with her in a variety of ways. Gowda said that he was not the CM during that period and said "Everyone knows how I am and what I am. I do not want to say anything about this to anyone right now."

=== Cybersex ===
A video clip purportedly showing Gowda in a sexually compromising position with an unidentified woman over a video call went viral on social media in September 2021. Gowda said that he has lodged a police complaint and alleged that the "fake, fabricated, concocted" video was "politically motivated" and said that it was created to tarnish his image.

=== Retirement ===
In November 2023, Gowda announced retirement from electoral politics, and stated that he would not be contesting in the 2024 Lok Sabha election. During a press conference he thanked his party leaders and seniors and said that the party had given him all opportunities in his long career, and wanted to vacate his place for youngsters.

== Positions held ==
- 1983–1988 State Secretary, BJP Yuva Morcha Karnataka
- 1994–2004 Member, Karnataka Legislative Assembly (two terms)
- 1995–1996 Member, Cell for preparing Draft Bill on Prohibiting atrocities on Women, Government of Karnataka
- 1999–2004 Deputy Leader of Opposition, Karnataka Legislative Assembly
- 1999–2001 Member, Committee on Commerce
- 2001–2002 Member, Committee for Energy, Fuel & Power, Karnataka Legislative Assembly
- 2002–2003 Member, Public Undertaking Committee, Karnataka Legislative Assembly
- 2003–2004 President, Public Accounts Committee, Karnataka Legislative Assembly
- 2004 Elected to 14th Lok Sabha
- 2006–2010 State President, BJP, Karnataka
- 2006–2009 Member, Committee on Commerce
- 2006–onwards Member, Sub-committee of the Department Related Parliamentary standing Committee on Commerce for Special Economic Zones
- 2009 Elected to 15th Lok Sabha
- 2011–2012 Elected as 20th Chief Minister of Karnataka
- 2013 Elected as the leader of opposition of Karnataka Legislative Council
- 2014 Elected to 16th Lok Sabha from Bangalore North and took oath as Minister of Railways in Narendra Modi cabinet
- 2015–2016 Cabinet Minister - Law & Justice
- 2016– Minister of Statistics and Programme Implementation
- 2019–2021 Elected to 17th Lok Sabha from Bangalore North and took oath as Ministry of Chemicals and Fertilizers+

== Electoral history ==
=== Lok Sabha ===
Year	Constituency	Party	Votes	%	Opponent	Party	Votes	%	Result	Margin	%
2019	Bangalore North	BJP	8,24,500	52.84	Krishna Byregowda	INC	6,76,982	43.39	Won	+1,47,518	+9.45
2014	Bangalore North	BJP	7,18,326	52.91	C. Narayanaswamy	INC	4,88,562	35.99	Won	+2,29,764	+16.92
2009	Udupi Chikmagalur	BJP	4,01,441	48.09	K. Jayaprakash Hegde	INC	3,74,423	44.86	Won	+27,018	+3.23
2004	Mangalore	BJP	3,84,760	48.61	M. Veerappa Moily	INC	3,51,345	44.38	Won	+33,415	+4.23

== Family ==
Sadananda Gowda married Datty Sadananda in 1981, with whom he had two sons. In 2003, their elder son Kaushik, a medical student, died in a road accident near Puttur. Their younger son, Karthik Gowda, is a businessman.

Lok Sabha
Preceded by V. Dhananjay Kumar	Member of Parliament for Mangalore; 2004–2009	Succeeded by Constituency ceased to exist
Preceded by Constituency created	Member of Parliament for Udupi Chikmagalur; 2009–2012	Succeeded by K. Jayaprakash Hegde
Preceded by D. B. Chandre Gowda	Member of Parliament for Bangalore North; 2014 – 2024	Succeeded by Shobha Karandlaje
Political offices
Preceded by B. S. Yeddyurappa	Chief Minister of Karnataka; 4 August 2011 – 12 July 2012	Succeeded by Jagadish Shettar
Preceded by Mallikarjun Kharge	Minister of Railways; 26 May 2014 – 9 November 2014	Succeeded by Suresh Prabhakar Prabhu
Preceded by Ravi Shankar Prasad	Minister of Law and Justice; 9 November 2014 – 5 July 2016	Succeeded by Ravi Shankar Prasad
Preceded by V K Singh (Minister of State with Independent charge)	Minister of Statistics and Programme Implementation; 5 July 2016 – 30 May 2019	Succeeded by Rao Inderjit Singh (Minister of State with Independent charge)
Preceded by Ananth Kumar	Minister of Chemicals and Fertilizers; 14 November 2018 – 7 July 2021	Succeeded by Mansukh L. Mandaviya
