= Somwarpet =

- Town
- Somawarapete
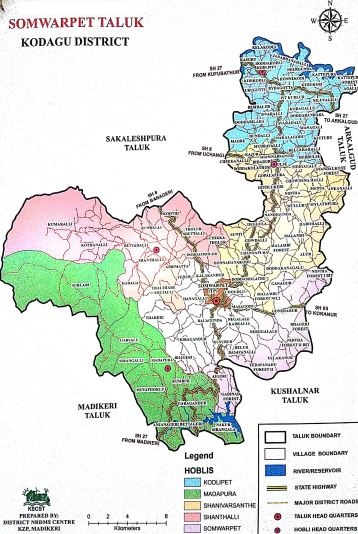
- Map of Somwarpet Taluk in the Kodagu District

- Location of Somawarapete
- Coordinates: 12.597387°N 75.849588°E
- Country: India
- State: Karnataka
- District: Kodagu

Government
  - Body: Town Panchayat

Area
  - Town: 8.83 km^{2} (3.41 sq mi)
  - Rural: 990.85 km^{2} (382.57 sq mi)
- Elevation: 1,130 m (3,710 ft)

Population (2011)
  - Town: 6,729
  - Density: 762/km^{2} (1,970/sq mi)
  - Rural: 184,450

Languages
  - Official: Kannada
- Time zone: UTC+5:30 (IST)
- Postal code: 571236
- ISO 3166 code: IN-KA
- Vehicle registration: KA 12
- Website: www.somwarpettown.mrc.gov.in

Somwarpet (somavārapēte, also written Somvarpet) is a panchayat town, taluka in Kodagu district in the Indian state of Karnataka. It is the main town of the Somwarpet taluk, in the north-east of the district. 2nd highest Administrative town in Karnataka in terms of elevation. The main crops grown in the area are coffee and spice crops such as cardamom, peppers, oranges, ginger, cinnamon and vegetables.

== Rainfall ==
Based on the reports of the Karnataka State Natural Disaster Monitoring Centre (KSNDMC) taken from 2018 to 2020, Somwarpet Town received on an average, annual rainfall of 2,125 mm (83.7 in). In 2022, Somwarpet hobli received an annual rainfall of 2,250 mm (89 in).

== Demographics ==
As of the 2001 India census, Somwarpet had a population of 7218. Males constitute 50% of the population and females 50%. Somvarpet has an average literacy rate of 75%, higher than the national average of 59.5%: male literacy is 80%, and female literacy is 70%. In Somvarpet, 12% of the population is under 6 years of age.

== Flora and fauna ==
Coffee is the major crop in the region. It is the major Arabica coffee growing region of India. Other crops like pepper, cardamom, orange, vanilla are grown. Rice, ginger is also grown.

== Tourist attractions ==
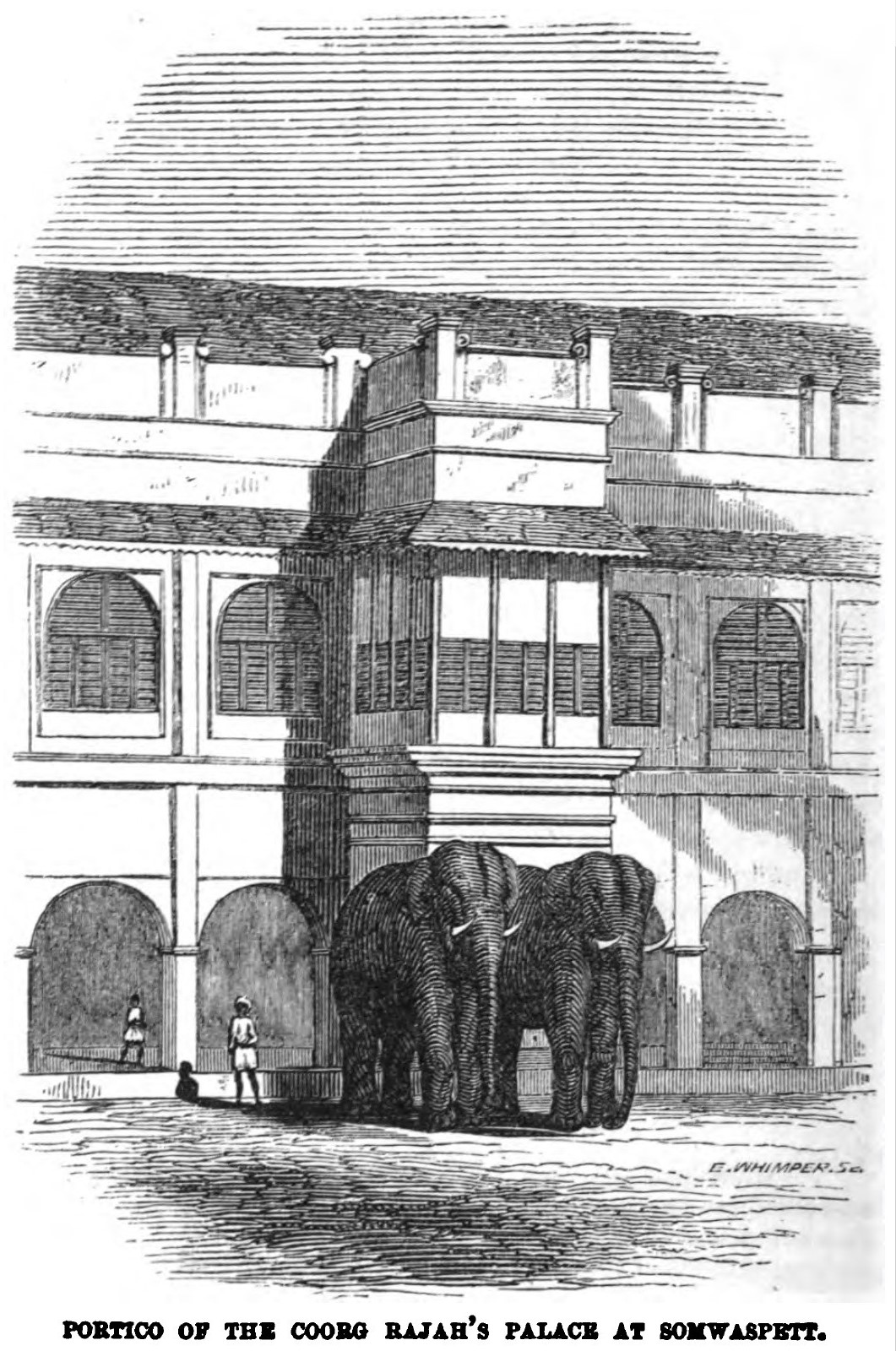
Portico of the Coorg Rajah's Palace at Somwaspett (May 1853, X, p.48)

A number of tourist attractions in Somwarpet Taluk are short distances of up to 25 km (16 mi) from Somwarpet. These include the Beluru Golf Club, several peaks with trekking routes (Male Malleshwara Betta, Kotebetta and Makkalagudi Betta), the Dubare Elephant Camp, and Mallalli Falls.

Other attractions further away in the Taluk include Kushalanagar, Harangi Reservoir, Nagarhole National Park, Betttarashi betta, Silent falls, Doodakalu betta and Gantukallu Betta.

== See also ==
- Madikeri
- Mangalore
- Virajpet
- Kushalanagar
