= Dasara =

Dasara may refer to:

== Festivals ==
- In South India, the Nine-day festival of Navaratri
  - In Mysore, Mysore Dasara
    - Dasara elephants, an integral part of the Mysore Dasara festival
  - In Madikeri, Madikeri Dasara
  - In Mangalore, Mangalore Dasara
- In Nepal, the 15-day festival of Dashain
- In Northern India, the tenth day of the festival, Vijayadashami or Dussehra
- In Himachal Pradesh, a seven-day festival starting on that day, Kullu Dussehra
- In Eastern India, the Vijayadashami day of Durga Puja

== Art and entertainment ==
- Dassehra, 2018 Indian film
- Dasara (film), a 2023 Indian Telugu-language film by Srikanth Odela
  - Dasara (soundtrack)
- Dasara Bullodu, a 1971 Indian film

== See also ==
- Vijayadasami (disambiguation)
- Dasarahalli (disambiguation)
