= Madikeri Dasara =

Dasara festival

Madikeri Dasara (Kannada: ಮಡಿಕೇರಿ ದಸರ) is the Dasara festival is celebrated in the city of Madikeri in the Indian State of Karnataka. It has a history of over a hundred years. Madikeri Dasara is a ten-day celebration, which is beautified by 4 Karagas and 10 Mantapas depicting killing of Asuras (demons) by Suras (God/Goddess). Preparation for Madikeri dasara starts before 3 months. Most of the money for this celebration is collected from the people of Kodagu. Each of these 10 Mantapa committee has 50 to 100 members. A Mantapa comprises idols of height 8 to 15 feet, which is set up at the front of a lighting board. The cost of building a Mantapa will be ₹10 to 20 Lakhs.

Dasara Idol from Kundurumotte Temple

== History ==
Folklore has it that the people of Madikeri suffered from a disease many years ago. The King of Madikeri then decided to start Mariamma festival. Then on, the Mariamma festival is said to have been celebrated. The festival starts the day after Mahalaya Amavasya. Hence Dasara starts off with four Karagas.

It is the second-most famous Dasara Festival in India after Mysore Dasara.

== Karaga in Madikeri Dasara ==
There are 4 Mariamma Temples in the town: Dandina Mariamma, Kanchi Kamakshamma, Kundurumotte Sri Chowti Mariamma and Kote Mariamma. Each of these Mariamma Temples has Karaga, which starts on the first day of Navaratri. These four Karagas represent the "Shakthi Devathas" of the town. All the Temples will be decorated by Lights and the whole Madikeri looks more beautiful on these 10 days. Karaga means carrying of vessel on the shaved head which is filled with rice, 9 types of grains (navadhanya) holi water and the vessel is decorated attractively. These karagas will be roaming in and around the city of Madikeri for 5 days of DASARA and these karagas will be devoted by the households of madikeri.

Closer look of Karaga Dance

On the first day of Navarathri, the priests of these four Temples carry the tools required to build karaga on their head and make their way to a Place called Pampina Kere. The members of the Temple Committee also join this puja at Pampina Kere. A team of Volaga (a type of Band in Kodagu ) will also accompany these Karagas. Volaga gives the people an indication that the Karaga is coming and also it gives a rhythm for the Karaga Dance. The priest who takes up the Karaga is dressed with Yellow coloured Kacche. Also the Priest's head is shaved. He holds a Knife in one hand and a Wooden stick (called as Bettha in Kannada) on the other. These Priests start build Karaga by using Flowers like Jasmin, Kanakambara, Sevantige etc. After building the Karaga, there will be a pooja for these four Karagas. The Temple Priests take the Karaga on their head after this pooja and will go to many temples in Rathabeedi (street for chariots). At late night they will head towards their Temples. Karaga dance is very attractive to watch. The people of Madikeri offer puja for all the Karagas. Till Ayudha pooja (puja to the weapons, and household materials) these Karagas visit almost every home of Madikeri and take pujas.

People watching the Karaga Dance

== Cultural programs ==
The city Dasara Committee organizes cultural programmes on all the 10 days. The first 7 days the programs will be there at Kaveri Kalaskhetra (Town Hall of Madikeri - where cultural programs are held). Rest three days the programs are conducted at a Stage near Raja's Seat known as Gandhi Maidan. On the day of Vijayadashami, there will an orchestra from night 9 p.m. till morning 6 a.m. The program concludes with the price distribution cermoney for the top 3 Mantapas. In recent days Madikeri dasara is gaining more attraction compared to Mysore dasara, as Mysore dasara is held at day light but Madikeri dasara begins at Midnight of Vijayadashami.

As a part of Dasara celebrations, a variety of programmes for children were held in 2012 called Makkala Dasara for the first time in the history of Madikeri Dasara.

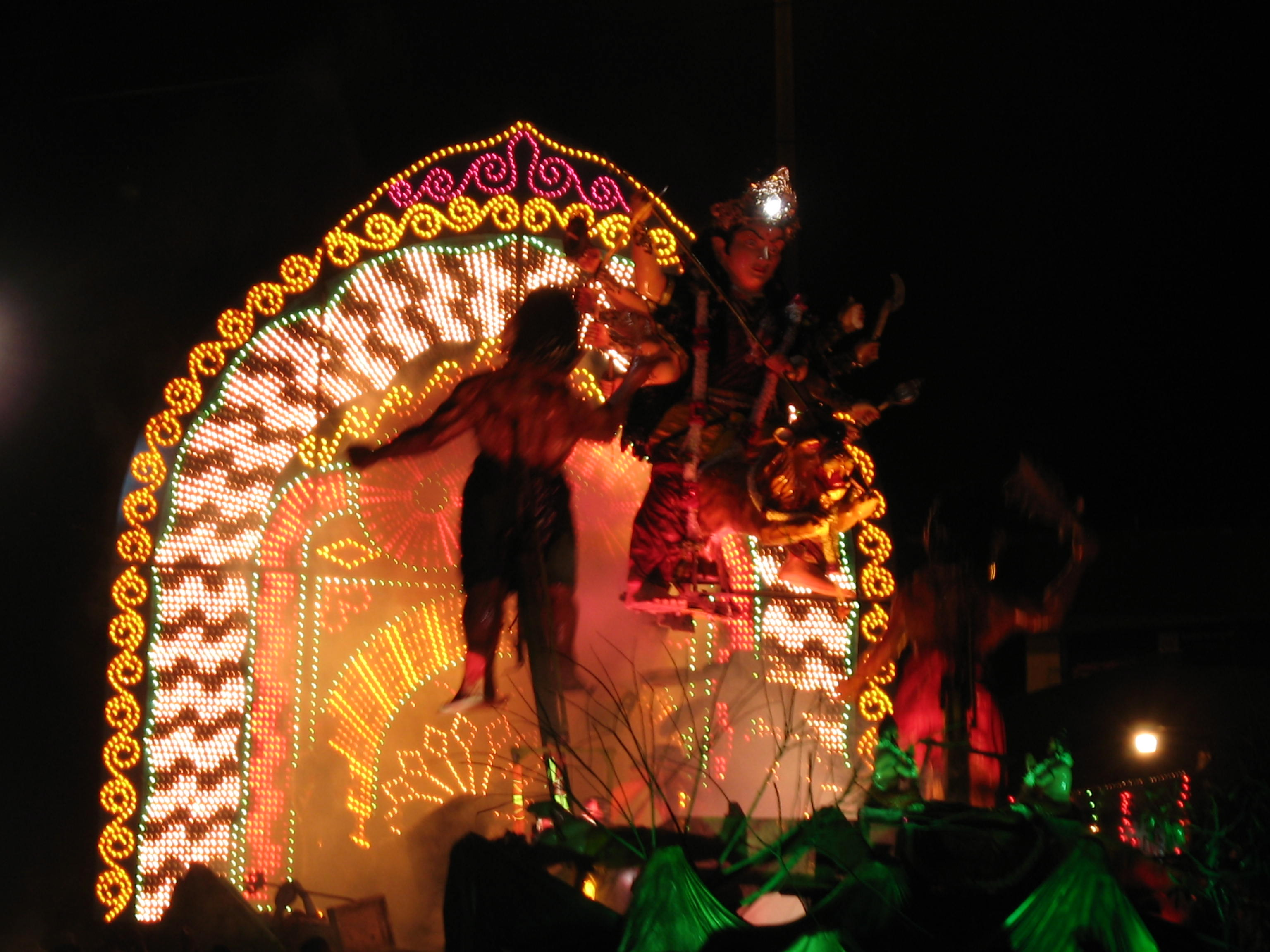
Mantapa from Kanchi Kamakshi Temple in Dasara procession

== Procession of Mantapas ==
The main attraction of Madikeri Dasara is the procession of Mantapas from ten temples. The procession starts in the 9th night of Vijayadashami and ends on the 10th morning of Vijayadashami. Each Mantapa is of height about 21 to 25 feet. Studio setting is also done for these Mantapas. Now-a-days the movements of idols are so attractive to watch and these idols were prepared in many places of Karnataka. All the Idols in the mantapa will have its own movements with regard to the story which is adopted for particular mantapa. There will a Band set in front of every Mantap for the youth to dance. Whole Night Lakhs of people will be away from their houses to watch this procession. Each of these Mantapa depict the mythological stories of Hindu Mythology. The Idols in the mantap are given movements to match the story. Top Three best decorated Mantapas will be given prizes from the Madikeri Dasara committee pertaining to the movements, special attractions in the mantapa and lighting effects. Hopefully, Madikeri Dasara is one of the festival organized in Indian subcontinent which is graced and unified by other states of India like Tamil Nadu, Kerala with Karnataka. From Tamil Nadu lighting boards and Band Sets, from Kerala Band sets will be considered for Madikeri Dasara.

== The man behind Madikeri Dasara ==
The origin and development of Madikeri Dasara celebration is closely linked with Bheem Singh, a Rajasthani, who came to Madikeri and settled down there.

Bheem Singh was the prime mover of the first Dasara mantapa procession. He made the first mantapa on tractor by making wooden pallets as mantapa. Bheem Singh's forefathers had migrated from Rajasthan and settled in Mysore. Later they shifted to Madikeri. Bheem Singh's father Arjun Singh settled down in Madikeri to earn a livelihood. Bheem Singh, inspired by his father, a god fearing person, learnt the art carving kalol of deities.

Bheem Singh's daughter Sharadha Bhai says, "My father used to spend from his pocket and take the idols on his head and go from the house to another."

Sharadha Bhai also recalls that in 1958 and after there were only four mantapas. Bheem Singh's mantapa was second after the mantapa of Sri Rama Mandira. The other two were those of Decor Rama Mandira and Balaka Rama Mandira. She also recalls that the sanctity attached to Dasara celebration is in fact even today.

Bheem Singh's grandson Ravi Kumar Singh, a PWD contractor said, "Compared to those days, today’s Dasara can be termed a hi-tech Dasara when one looks at the way it has grown over the years." He also recalled that when the site for his house was identified it was told that it was having a temple like structure. Hence he thought of building a temple there called Raghu Rama Mandira.

Ravi Kumar recalled the efforts of Bheem Singh in bringing toy makers from Mysore and the use of tractor to carry the idols. The first such idol was that of Sri Chamundeshwari and it was carried on a tractor in 1958. This was appreciated by the deputy commissioner of Coorg, I. C. Subbaiah awarded him in appreciation. The saga of Madikeri Dasara will not be complete without remembering Bheem Singh's Contributions.
