= Aiyangeri =

- village
- Aiyangeri is in Kodagu district
- Country: India
- State: Karnataka
- District: Kodagu
- Talukas: Madikeri

Government
  - Body: Village Panchayat

Languages : Kannada, kodava thakk and malayalam
  - Official: Kannada
- Time zone: UTC+5:30 (IST)
- Postal code: 571247
- Vehicle registration: KA12
- Nearest city: Madikeri, Mangalore
- Civic agency: Village Panchayat: Ayyangeri

Ayyangeri is a village in the southern state of Karnataka, India. It is located in the Madikeri taluk of Kodagu district.
