= Vijayadasami =

Vijayadasami may refer to:

- Vijayadashami, Hindu festival, also known as Dusshera
- Vijayadasami (film), 2007 Indian Telugu-language film

== See also ==
- Dasara (disambiguation)
