= Dasarahalli (disambiguation) =

Dasarahalli is a town and a city municipal council in Bangalore Rural district in the state of Karnataka, India.

Dasarahalli may also refer to:

- Dasarahalli metro station, a metro station on the Green Line of the Namma Metro, Bangalore, India
- Dasarahalli, an administrative zone of Bruhat Bengaluru Mahanagara Palike of the Greater Bangalore metropolitan area
- Dasarahalli (Vidhana Sabha constituency), a constituency of the Karnataka Legislative Assembly
- Dasarahalli, Bellary, Ballari district, Karnataka, India

== See also ==
- Dasara (disambiguation)
- Halli (disambiguation)
