= Madikeri Fort =

Fort in Madikeri, India

- Madikeri, Karnataka
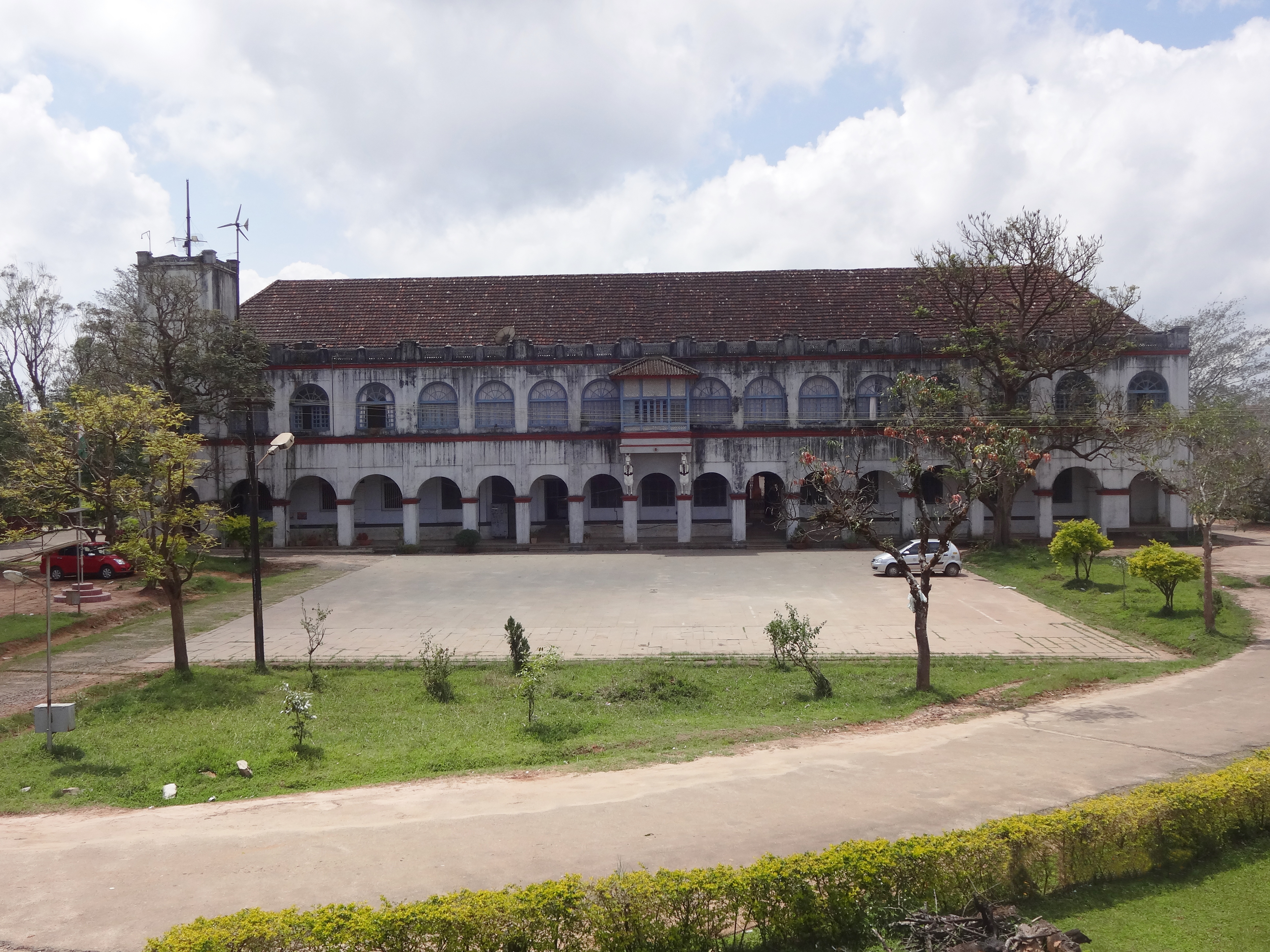
- Palace inside Madikeri Fort

Site information
- Controlled by: Government of Karnataka

Location
- Coordinates: 12.4208474°N 75.7389661°E

Site history
- Built: 17th century
- Built by: Mudduraja

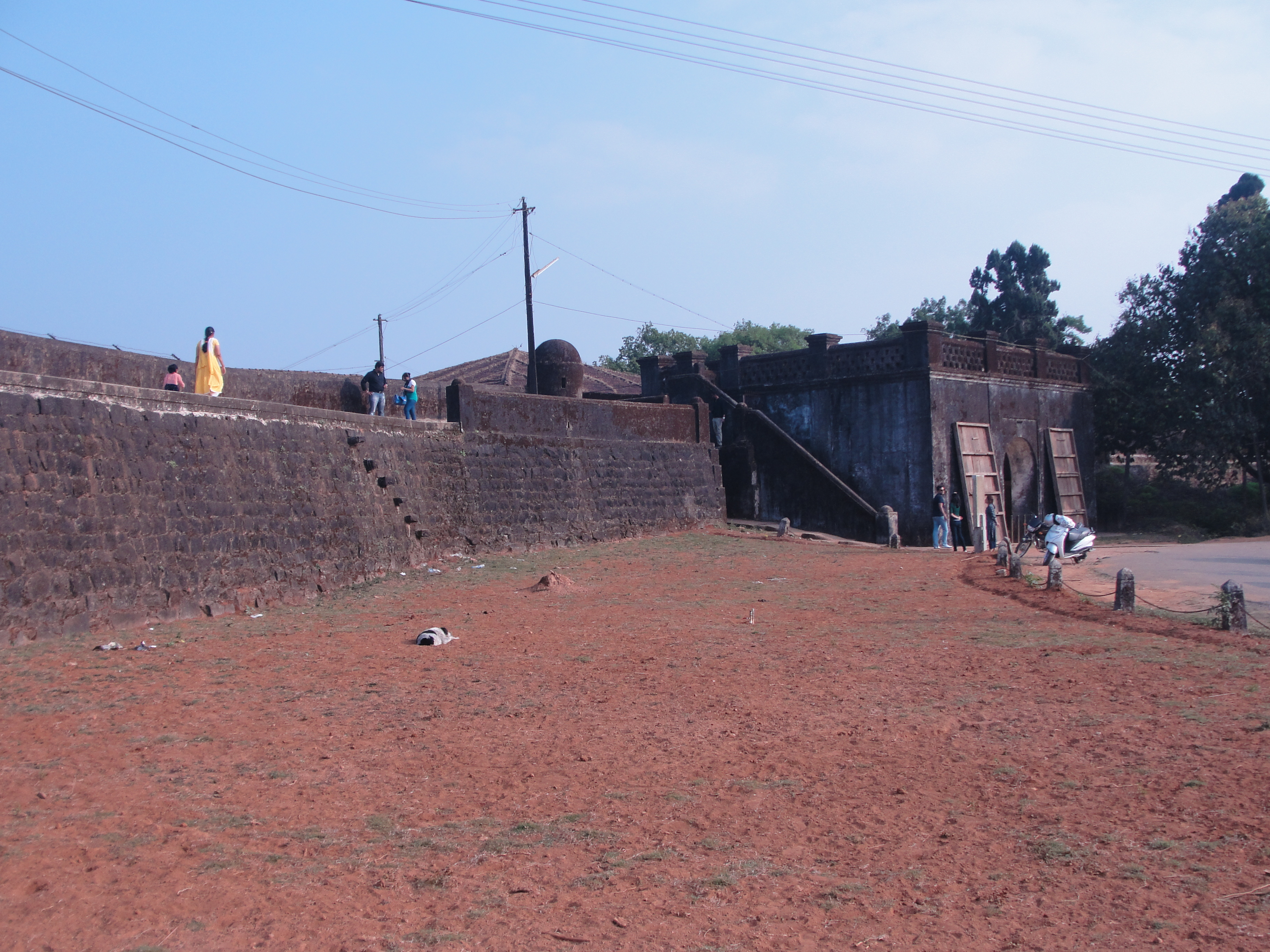
Madikeri Fort

Madikeri Fort, also called Mercara Fort, is a fort in Madikeri, in the Kodagu district of the Indian state of Karnataka, first built by Mudduraja, a banajigara king of lingayath faith, who was from a family of bedanur royal house, in the second half of the 17th century. Mudduraja also built the palace within the fort. It was rebuilt and restructured in granite by Tipu Sultan, and the site was then renamed Jaffarabad. Madikeri Fort is one of the many forts built or rebuilt by Tipu Sultan during his reign in the second half of the 18th century. In 1790, Dodda Vira Rajendra took control of the fort. The palace underwent renovations by Linga Rajendra II from 1812 to 1814. The British made additions to the fort in 1834. Notable structures in the fort include two stone statues of elephants at the northeast entry and a church in the southeast corner.

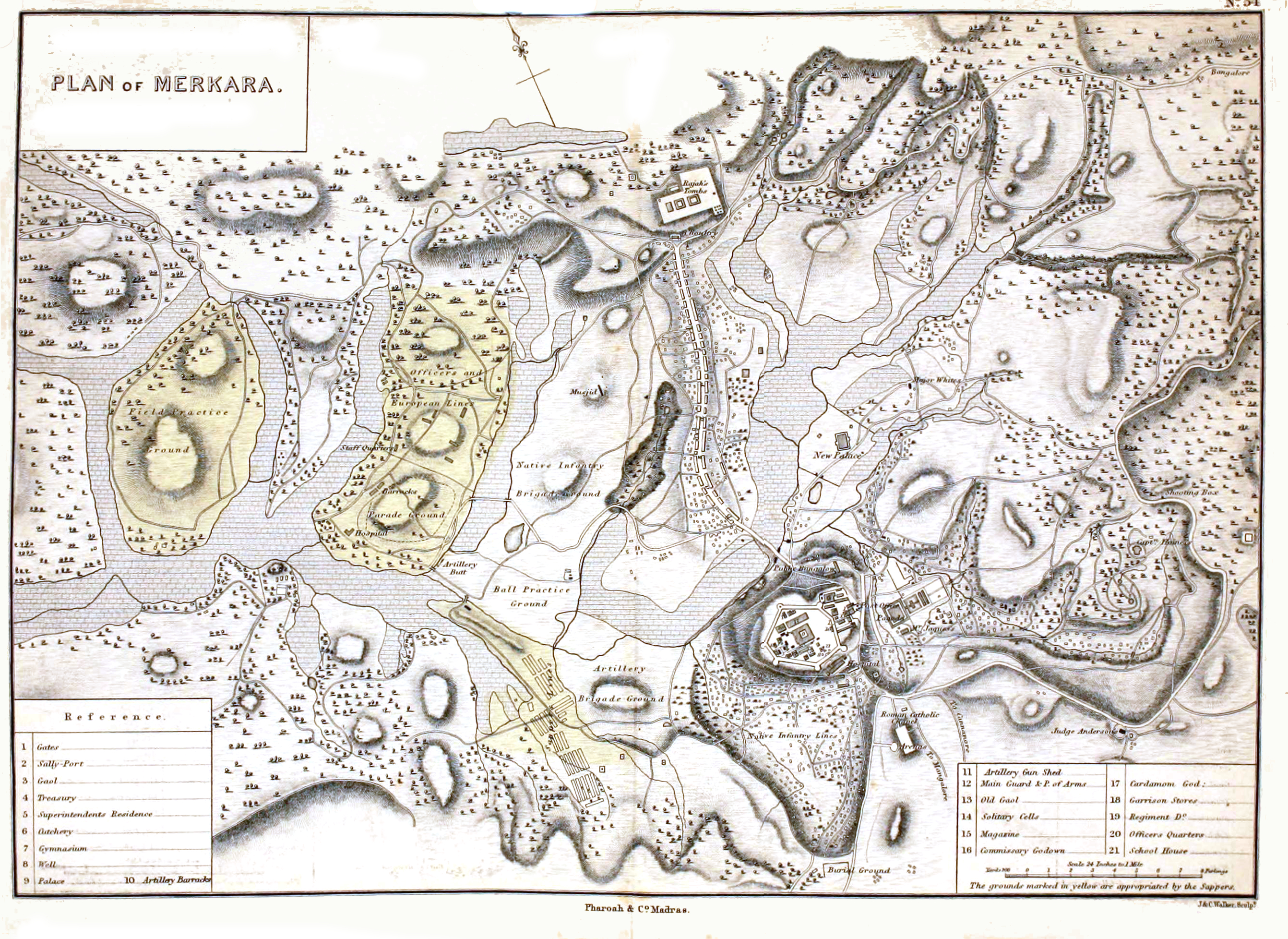
Map of Madikeri with fort in 1854. See alignment

Today, the Madikeri Deputy Commissioner's Office is housed in the palace building, while St. Mark's Church houses the Madikeri Fort Museum, managed by the Karnataka State Archaeological Department. The museum has exhibits which display artifacts and weaponry from the time between the fort's construction and British rule. The museum also has a large portrait of Field Marshal K. M. Cariappa. The church was constructed in 1859 by soldiers of the East India Company, with funding from the Madras Presidency. The church was administered by the Madras Diocese of the Church of England, but was closed after Indian independence, and taken over by the Government of Karnataka in 1971.

== Gallery ==
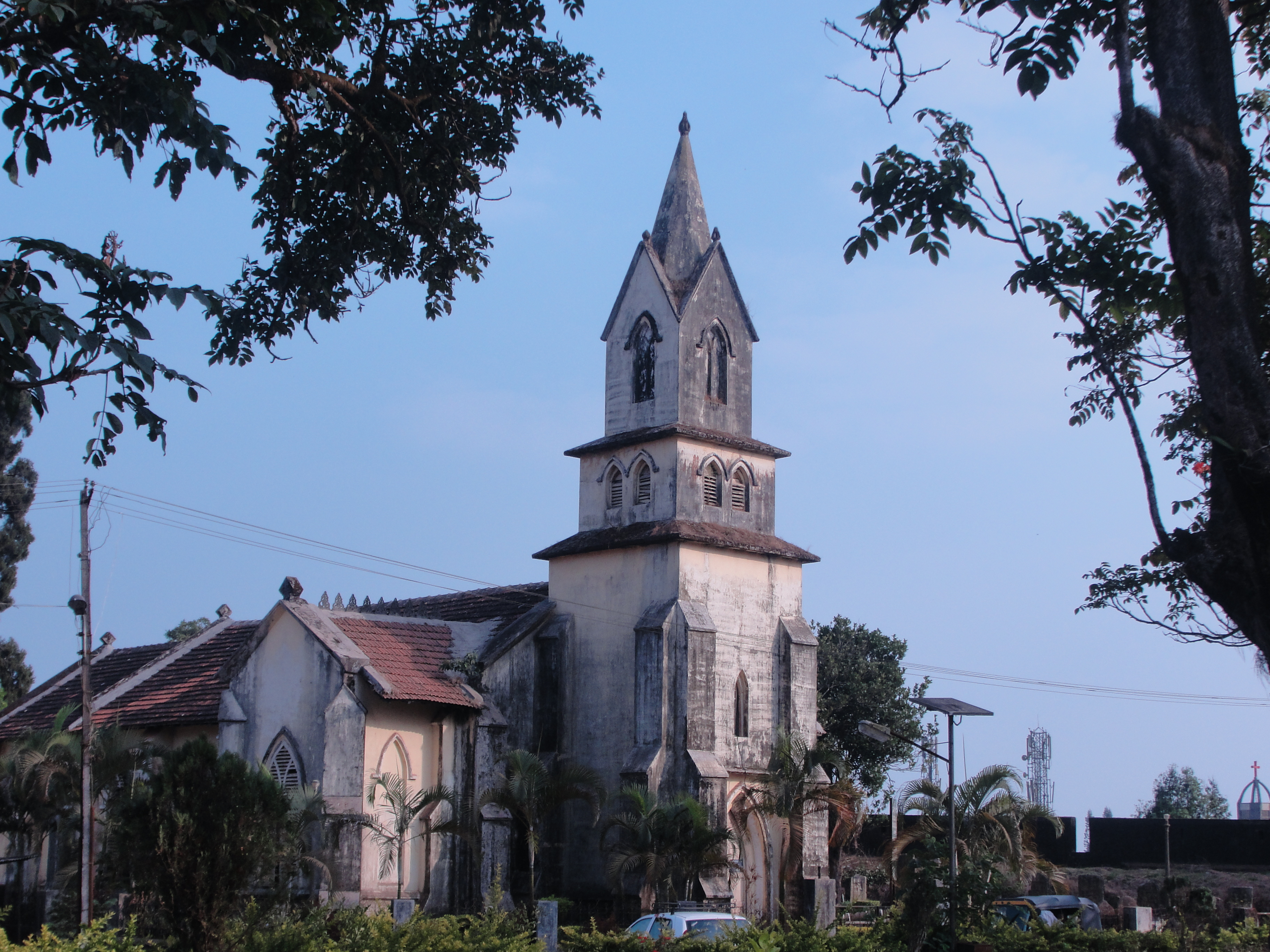
Archeological Museum, Madikeri Fort, India

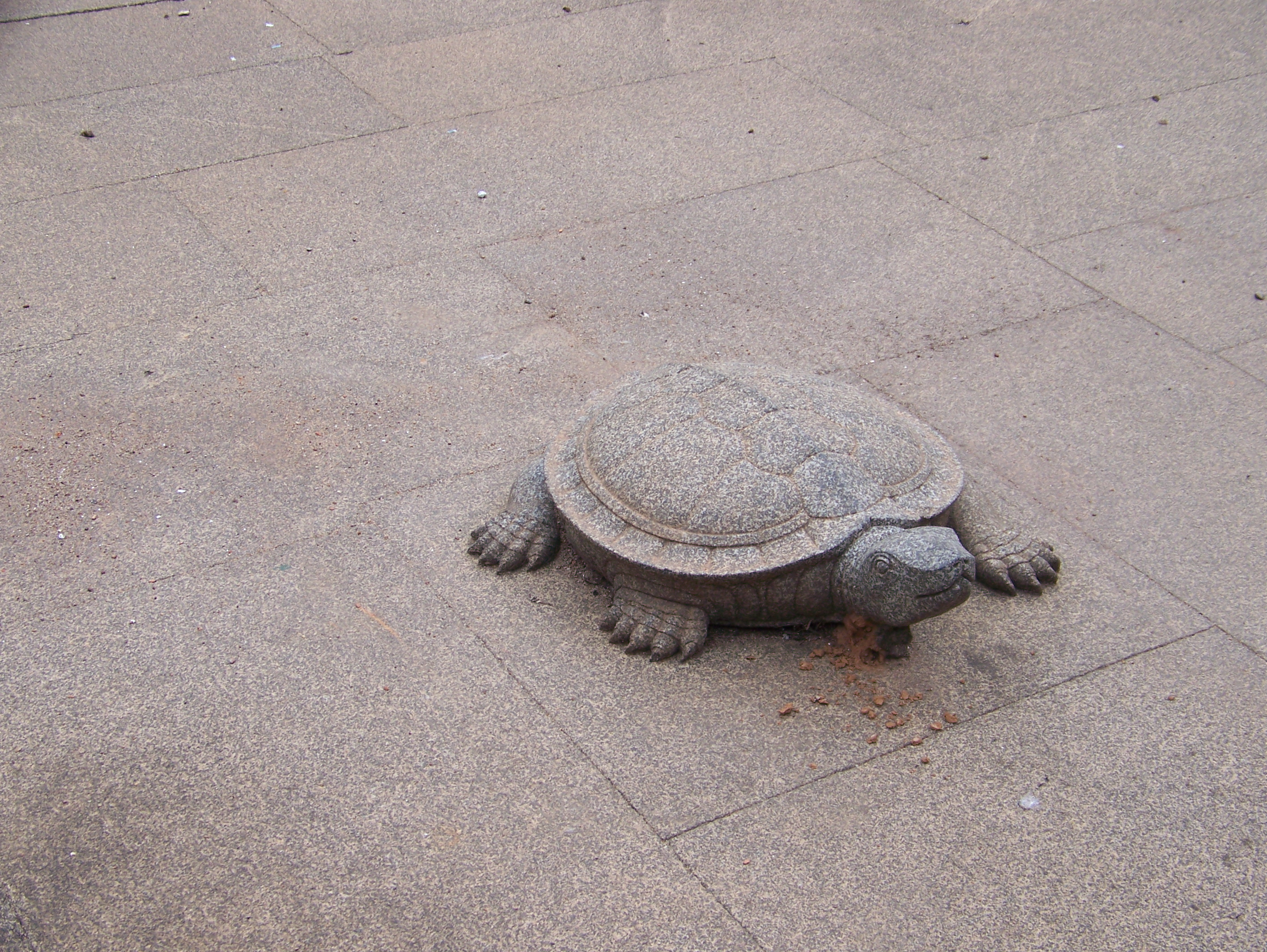
Stone turtle inside the palace

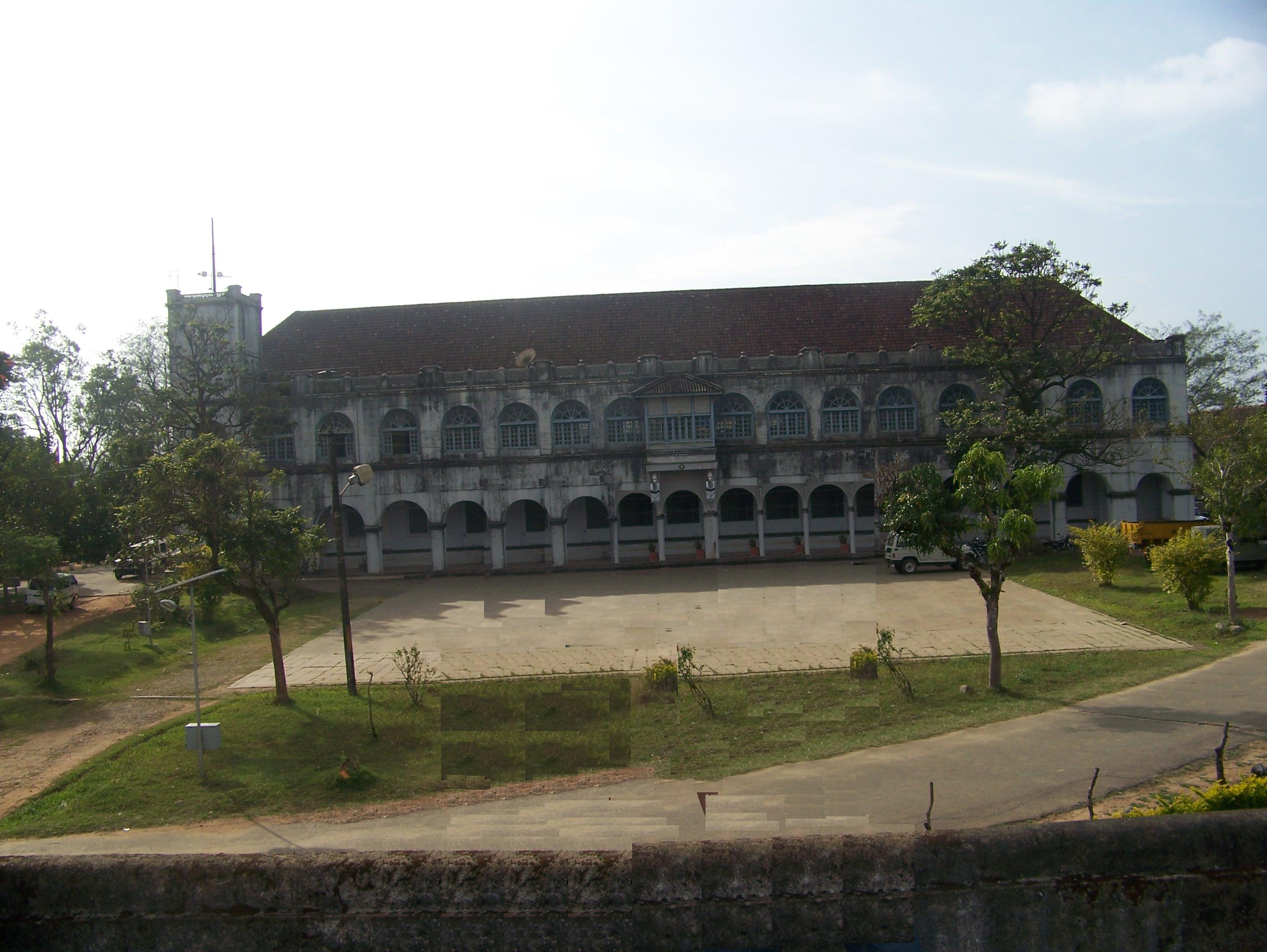
Madikeri palace – within the fort

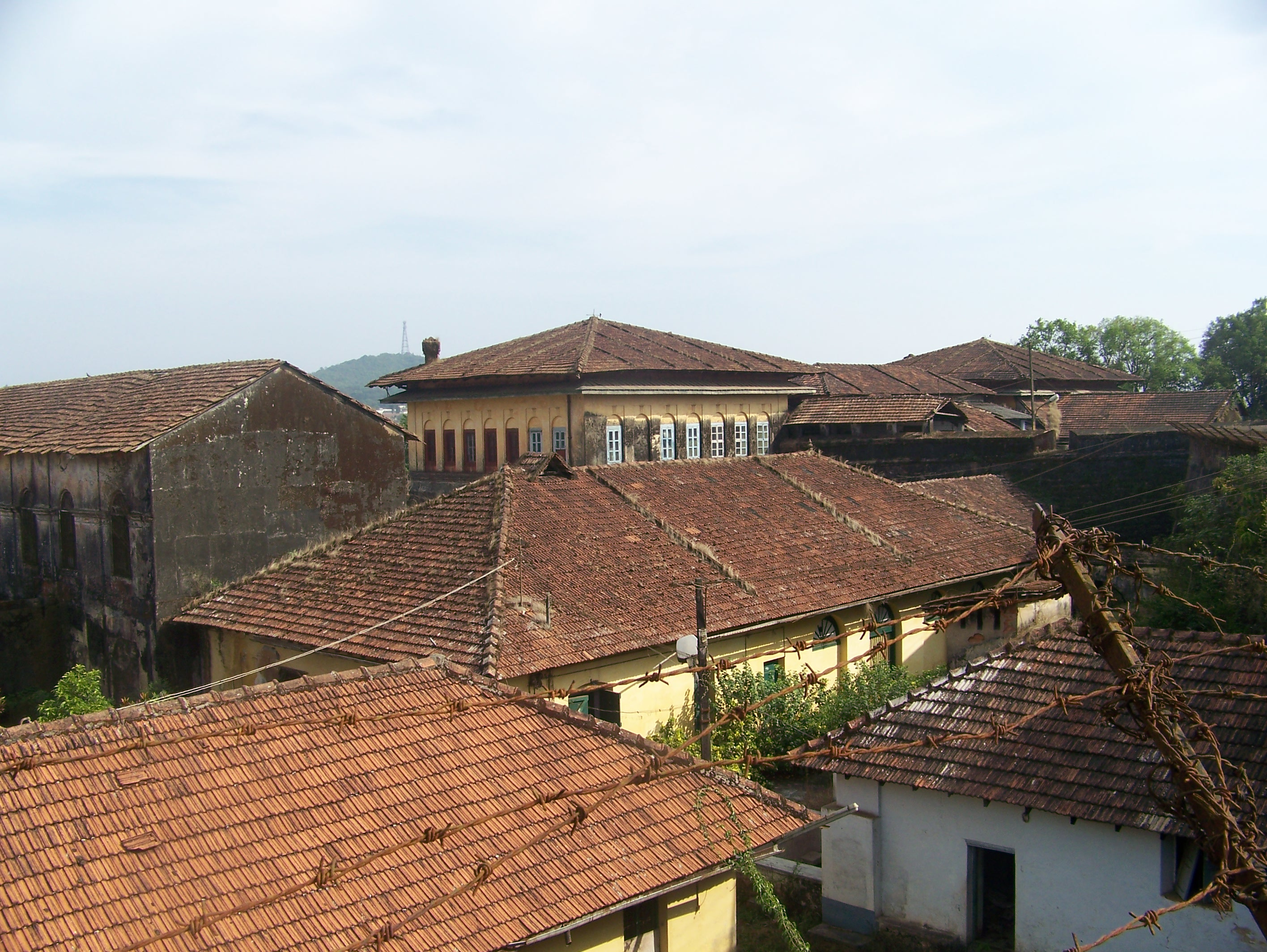
View from the Madikeri Fort wall

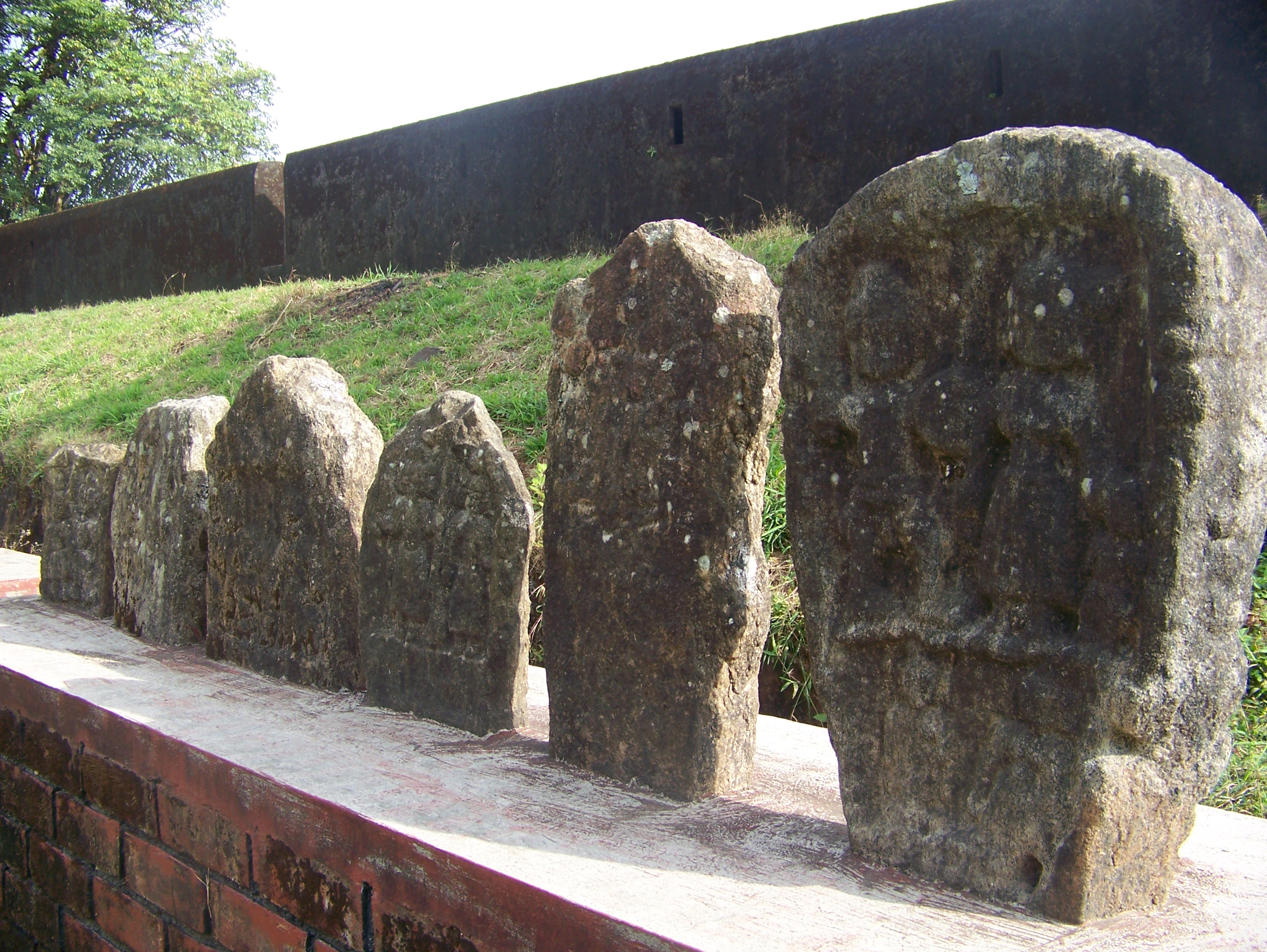
Hero stones

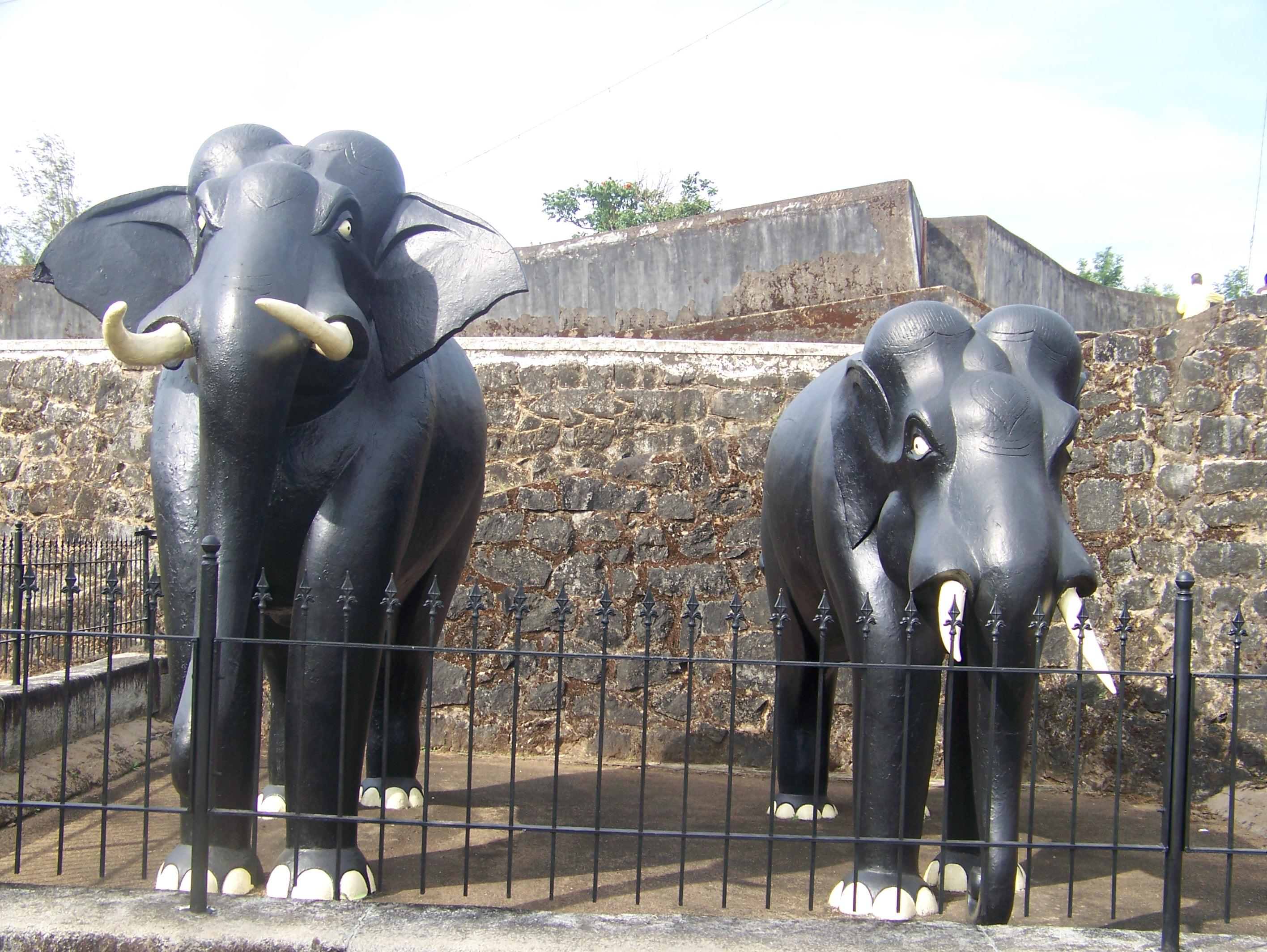
Masonry elephants
