= St. Mark's Church, Mercara =

St. Mark's Church
- St. Mark's Church, Mercara
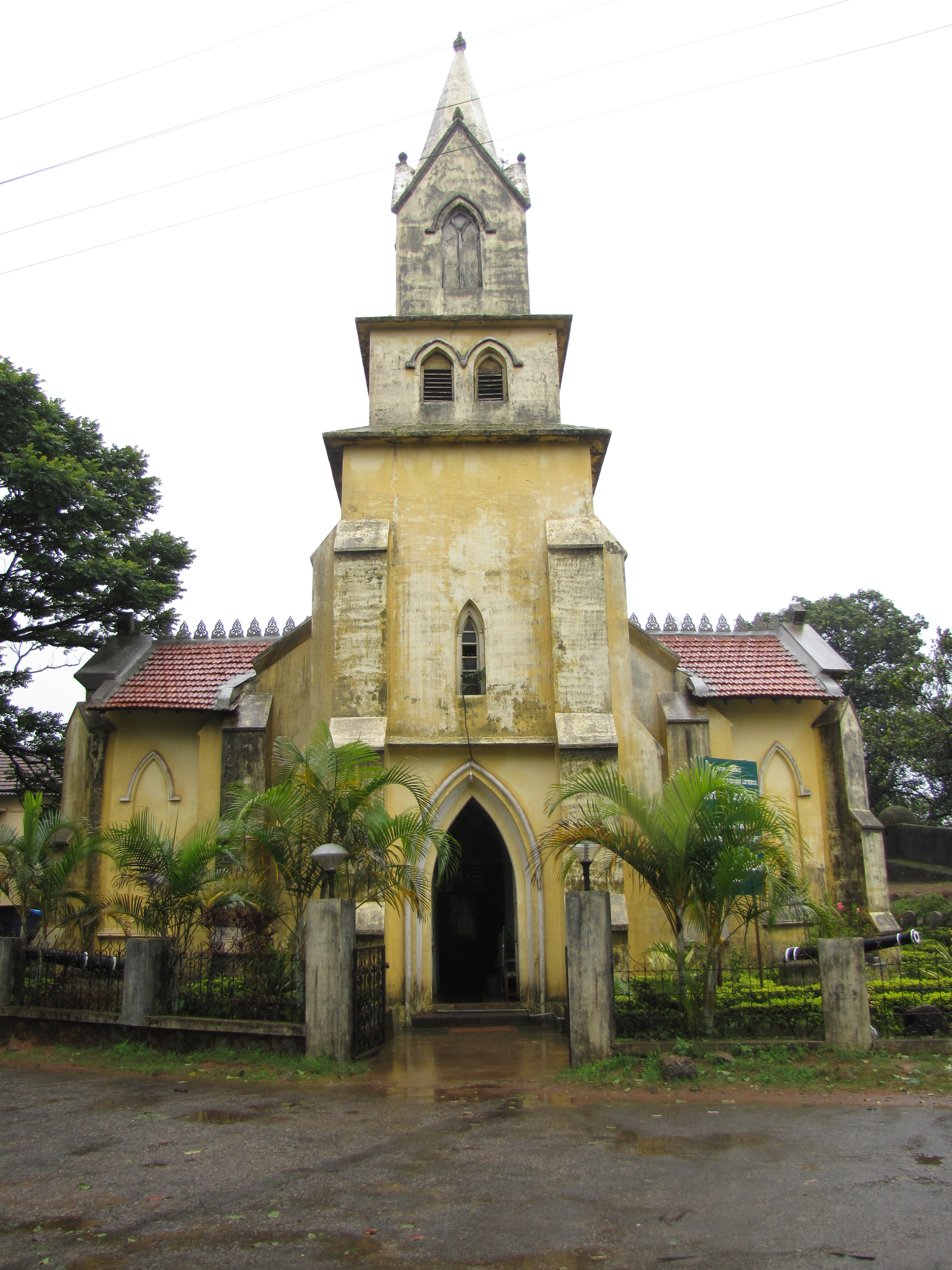
- St. Mark's Church
- 12.4203661°N 75.7392854°E
- Location: Mercara Fort, Coorg
- Country: India
- Denomination: Anglican Church of England

Architecture
- Style: Gothic
- Completed: 29 April 1859
- Closed: 1947

Specifications
- Length: 48 ft (15 m)
- Width: 24 ft (7.3 m)

Administration
- Diocese: Diocese of Madras

The St. Mark's Church, is located within the Mercara Fort, Coorg, India and was raised in 1859, by the officers and men of the East India Company. The church building was funded by the Government of Madras, and placed under the Church of England in India, Diocese of Madras. The Church was closed after Indian independence, and taken over by the Government of Karnataka in 1971. The building now houses the Madikeri Fort Museum, managed by the Karnataka State Archaeological Department.

== History ==
Coorg had been an independent Hindu Kingdom for many centuries, until the invasion of Hyder Ali and Tippu Sultan in 1765, resulting in large scale devastation, forcible conversion to Islam and incarceration of thousands of Kodava people at Seringapatam. Following the defeat of Tippu Sultan in the Third Anglo–Mysore War (1789–92), Coorg became independent again, under the suzerainty of the British. In 1834, the Coorg Kingdom was annexed by the British, and the last Raja Chikka Virarajendra was pensioned off on an annual privy pension of British £12,000 and banished to Kashi. Following annexation, a regiment of the Madras Army and British civil servants were stationed in Coorg.

=== Regimental Mess ===
The first church services for the officers and men at the Coorg Station were conducted in the Regimental Mess of the Madras Army. The church records start in 1842, where the chaplain stationed at the Mangalore military station made official visits to Coorg to conduct church services in the dry seasons. In 1850, an average of 90 people were found attending these services (p. 196).

=== Ownership Dispute ===
In 1847, a request was made to the Government of Madras, to fund the building of a small church at a cost of BINR 2000, which was approved by the directors of the East India Company. The officers and men collected a further BINR 3000 for the church building fund. Since the local officers and men had contributed most of the funds, Bishop Dealtry wanted the ownership of the new church to be vested with the Bishop and Archdeacon of Madras, Church of England, rather than with the Government of Madras. This was disputed by the company, and the issue was escalated to the office of the Governor-General of India, Government of British India, Calcutta, which decided in favour of the ownership being vested with the Government of Madras (p. 196-198).

=== Church Building ===
In 1853, the site of the ruins of a disused temple (Virabhadra Temple), and the adjoining quarters of the Sergeant-Major of the 4th Regiment of the Madras Native Army, was chosen for the Church. Coorg became the primary military station and Rev. A Fenell was transferred to Coorg from Mangalore. The construction cost of the church was BINR 9650. Some of the main contributors for building the church were

- Government of Madras Rs. 2000
- Madras Church Building Society (1850) Rs. 750
- SPCK (London) Rs. 500
- Local Subscriptions Rs. 4000

And Rev. Fennel further obtained

- Government of Madras Rs. 1750
- Madras Church Building Society (1857) Rs. 250
- Local Subscriptions Rs. 400

Local subscriptions were from the officers and men of the 2nd Regiment (1847–53) and the 4th Regiment (1853–59) of the Madras Native Infantry (p. 198-199).

=== Consecration ===
The church at Mercara, Coorg was consecrated on 19 April 1859, by Bishop Dealtry and named after Saint Mark the Evangelist.

In 1883, the military regiment was withdrawn from Coorg. However, by that time many European had settled in Coorg, being involved in coffee plantations. Hence the church membership was not affected.

In 1868, Rev. J W Wynch obtained government grant for modifying the vestry into a chancel. This was completed in 1870, costing INR 3940, during the time of Rev C H Deane. Further repairs were done to the flooring and roof in 1881 and 1877.

== Architecture ==
The church is built in the Gothic style, with stained glass decorative windows. The building measures 48x24 ft2, with 2 small rooms in the west side with doorways between them and the nave. One of these rooms served as the store room and the other as the vestry for the choir. The chancel which was added in 1871, has a breadth of 20 ft. and depth of 22 ft. The organ chamber was raised in 1896 by raising local subscriptions(p. 199)

== Memorials ==
There are memorial inscriptions for Major. Frank Vardon (died 1860) of the 25th Madras Native Infantry by Westmacott and for the wife of Surgeon-Major Barclay (died 1863). The stained glass on the west window, depicting 'Lord as the Good Shephard' was raised in memory of Rev A Fenell (died 1897). The lectern was donated by Mrs. J S Trelawney and the altar vases were donated by Mrs. J T Morgan (p. 200).

== Gallery ==
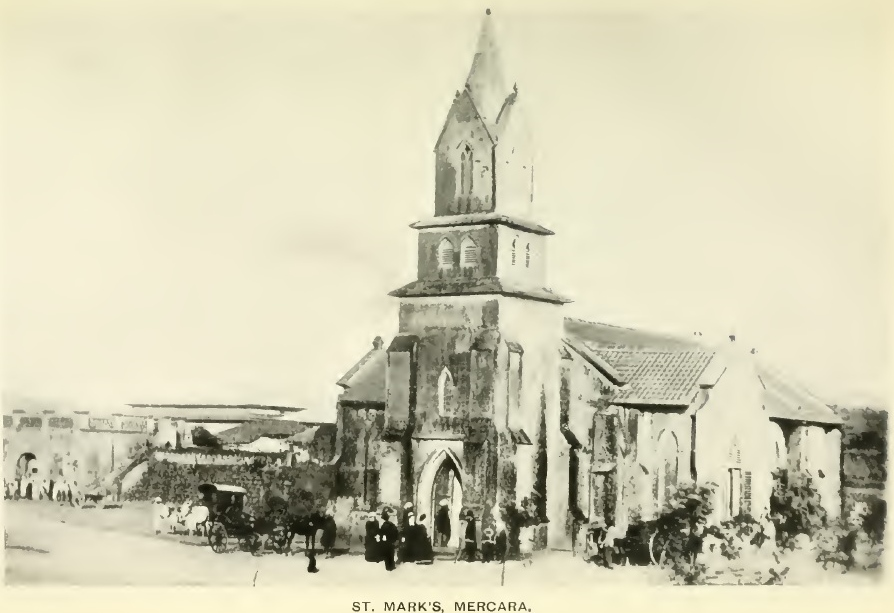
St. Mark's Church, Mercara by Rev. Frank Penny's Book 'The Church in Madras - Vol. III'

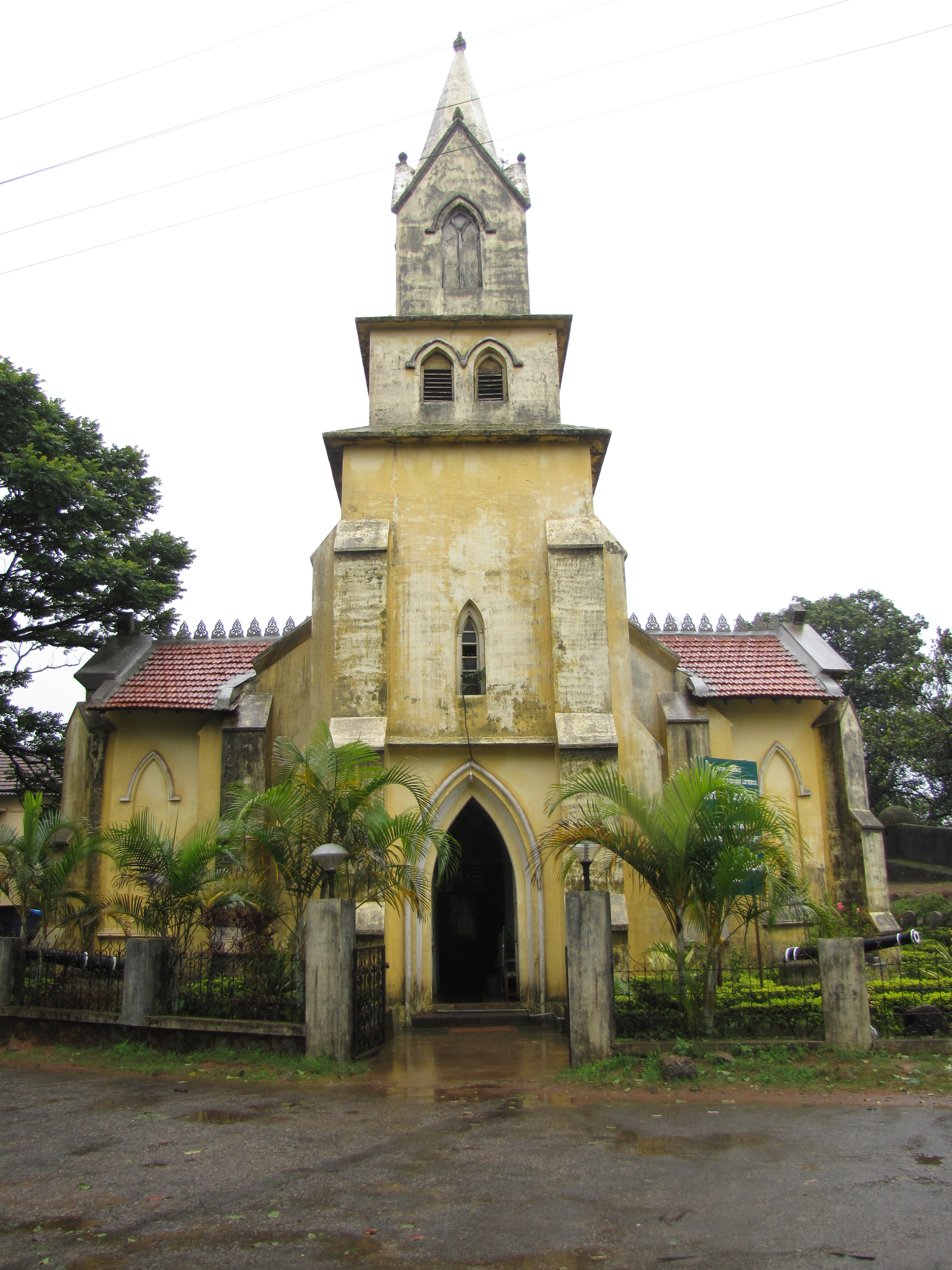
St. Mark's Church, Mercara (2013)

== Museum ==
The building of the St. Mark's Church, now holds a museum of artefacts and memorabilia from the British period, Hindu and Jain sculptures, village deities and antique weapons. The museum also has a section dedicated to Field Marshal K M Cariappa, displaying his awards and honours. The museum is maintained by the State Archaeological Department, Government of Karnataka. Coins and documents of the erstwhile Kingdom of Coorg are also displayed.
