= Raja's Seat =

Site and tourist attraction in Madikeri, Karnataka, India

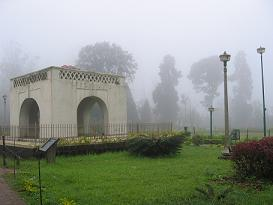
- Raja's Seat, one of the major tourist attractions in Madikeri
- Interactive map of the Raja's Seat area

General information
- Type: Pavilion; viewpoint
- Location: Madikeri, Kodagu district, Karnataka, India
- Coordinates: 12°24′51.94″N 75°44′12.97″E
- Completed: 17th–18th century (Kodagu rulers)
- Owner: Government of Karnataka

Technical details
- Material: Brick and mortar

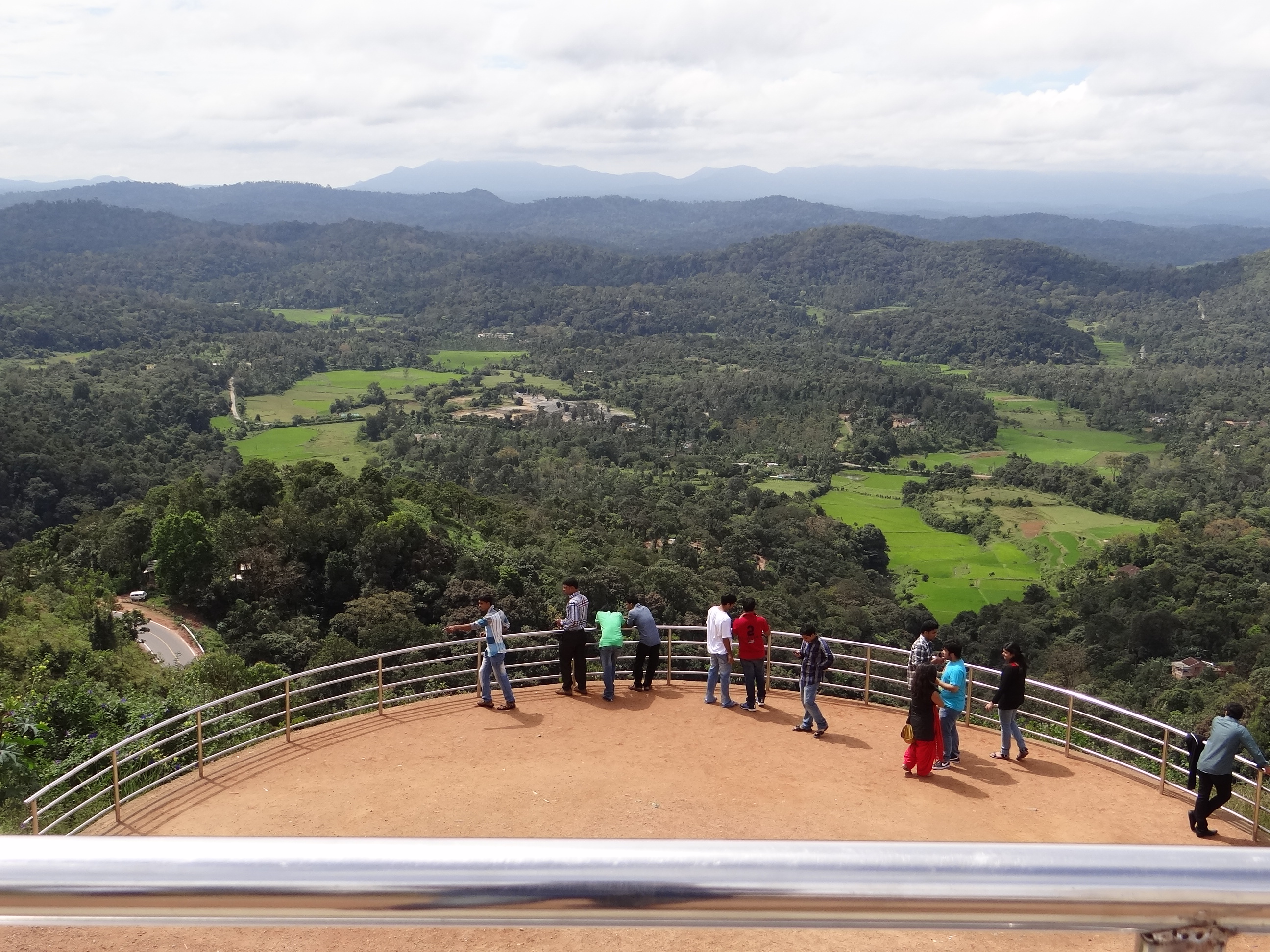
View point on Raja's Seat

Raja's Seat (Seat of the King) is a culturally significant site and tourist attraction in Madikeri of Coorg District. It is 270km away from Bangalore, the capital of Karnataka.

Raja's Seat is located in the middle of a garden called as Gandhi Mantap. It is a structure made of brick and mortar and consists of four pillars that are bridged by arches. This place was used by the Kings and the Queens of Kodagu who were the rulers of Karnataka for over 200 years from 1600 to 1834 CE. The garden is known for its scenery, and was a favourite place of recreation for the Rajas, and hence was permanently associated with them. It is built on a high level ground overlooking the cliffs and valleys to the west.

The Sarvodaya Diwas (also referred to as Martyrs' Day) is celebrated annually on 30 January in Coorg, the day of Gandhiji's assassination in 1948. During this day, a procession is arranged, and an urn containing Mahatma Gandhi's ashes are carried to the Raja's Seat. This procession is followed by reciting verses from the Bhagwad Gita, Koran and the Bible. Bhajans are sung, floral tributes are paid, and a few minutes of silence is observed to pay respects.
