= Vijayadashami =

Major Hindu festival

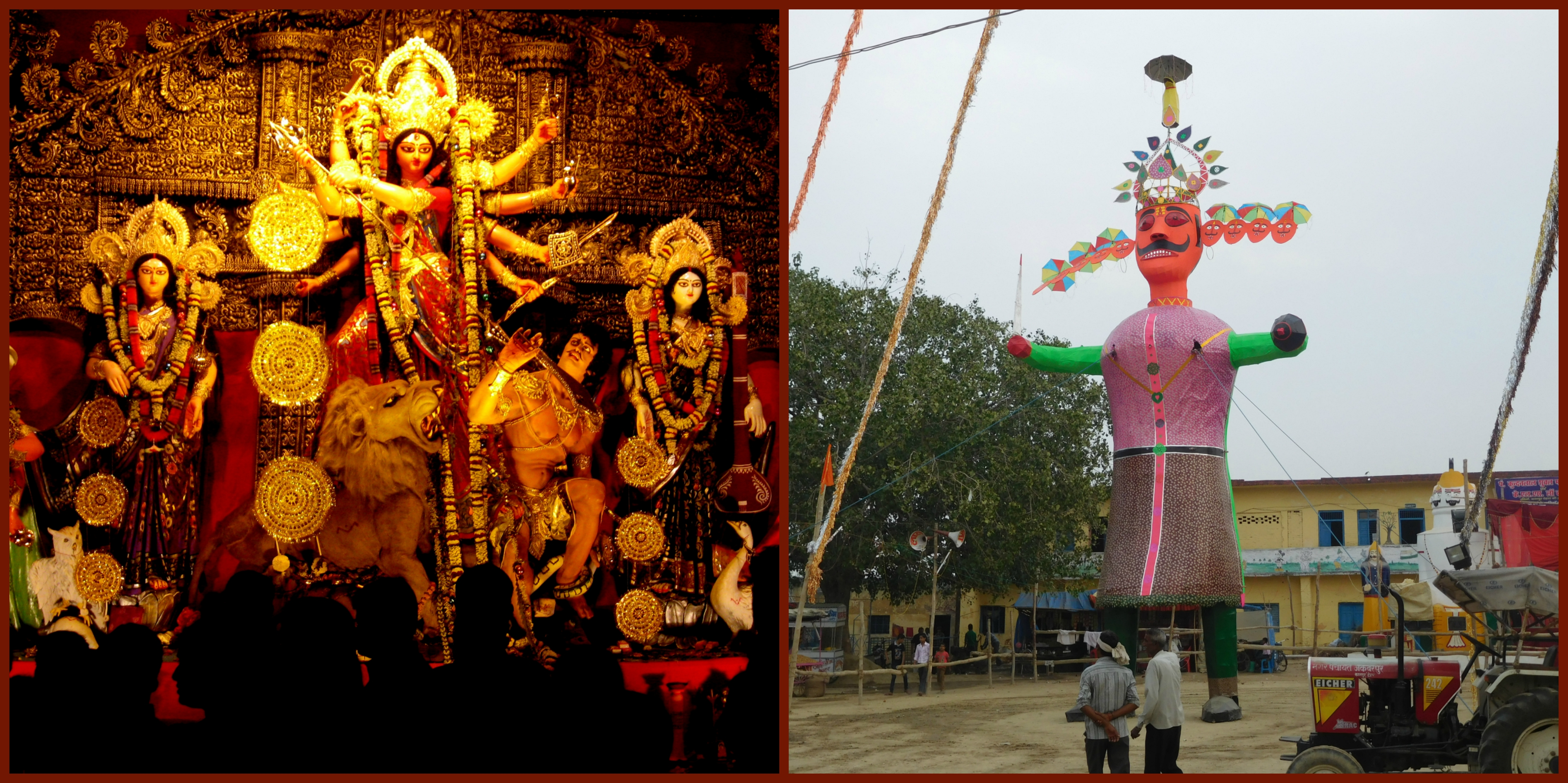
- Vijayadashami reveres Durga's and Rama's victory over evil depending on the region.
- Also called: Dasara, Dashāhra, Dashain, Dassahra
- Observed by: Hindus
- Type: Religious, Cultural
- Significance: Celebrates the victory of good over evil
- Celebrations: Marks the end of Durga Puja and Navaratri
- Observances: Pandals; plays; community gathering; recitation of scriptures; puja; fasting; immersion of idols or burning of Ravana
- Date: Ashvin Shukla Dashami
- 2026 date: 20 October (Tuesday)
- Duration: 1 day

Explanatory note on Hindu festival dates
- The Hindu calendar is lunisolar but most festival dates are specified using the lunar portion of the calendar. A lunar day is uniquely identified by three calendar elements: māsa (lunar month), pakṣa (lunar fortnight) and tithi (lunar day). Furthermore, when specifying the masa, one of two traditions are applicable, viz. amānta / pūrṇimānta. If a festival falls in the waning phase of the moon, these two traditions identify the same lunar day as falling in two different (but successive) masa. A lunar year is shorter than a solar year by about eleven days. As a result, most Hindu festivals occur on different days in successive years on the Gregorian calendar.

Vijayadashami (Sanskrit: विजयादशमी, romanized: Vijayādaśamī, lit. 'Tenth day of victory'), more commonly known as Dasara, or Dassahra, or Dussehra, (Note: The word dussehra is the Anglicized form of the Indic word daśahrā.) and also known as Dashāhra or Dashain in Nepali, is a major Hindu festival celebrated every year at the end of Durga Puja and Navaratri. It is observed on the tenth day of the waxing moon (Shukla Paksha) in the month of Ashvin, the seventh in the Hindu lunisolar calendar, and falls in the Gregorian calendar months of September or October.

Vijayadashami is observed for different reasons and celebrated in various ways in different parts of India and Nepal. In the southern, eastern, northeastern, and some northern states of India, Vijayadashami marks the end of Durga Puja, commemorating goddess Durga's victory against Mahishasura to restore and protect dharma. In the northern, central, and western states, it marks the end of Ramlila and commemorates the deity Rama's victory over Ravana. Alternatively, it marks a reverence for one of the aspects of Durga.

Vijayadashami celebrations include processions to a river or ocean front that involve carrying clay statues of Durga, Lakshmi, Saraswati, Ganesha, and Kartikeya, accompanied by music and chants, after which the images are immersed in the water for dissolution and farewell. In other places, towering effigies of Ravana, symbolising evil, are burnt with fireworks, marking evil's destruction. The festival also marks the start of preparations for Deepavali, the important festival of lights, which is celebrated twenty days after Vijayadashami.

== Etymology ==
Vijayādaśamī (विजयादशमी) is a Sanskrit compound formed from vijaya (विजय, 'victory') and daśamī (दशमी, 'tenth day'). Together, they refer to the festival celebrated on the tenth day, marking the victory of good over evil.

In Nepal and regions with large Nepalese population, the name is pronounced Bijayādaśamī due to betacism. The name has the same meaning. It is part of the 15-day Dashain festival, and falls on its tenth day. Other forms of Vijayādaśamī are also used in different regions of India and among Hindu minorities found elsewhere.

The word Dussehra is the British English spelling of the Tadbhava Dassehrā. It is derives from the Sanskrit compound Daśaharā (दशहरा), formed from daśama (दशम, 'tenth') and ahar (अहर्, 'day').

== Epic literature ==
The celebration of this festival is founded in the epic Ramayana. It marks the day Rama is regarded to have slain the rakshasa king Ravana, who had abducted Rama's wife, Sita. Ravana kidnaps Sita and takes her to his kingdom in Lanka (identified with present day Sri Lanka). Rama asks Ravana to release her, but Ravana refuses; the situation escalates and leads to war. Prior to this, Ravana performed severe penance for ten thousand years and received a boon from the creator-god Brahma that he could henceforth not be killed by gods, demons, or spirits. However, Rama (a human incarnation of Vishnu) defeats and kills him, thus circumventing the boon given by Brahma. A battle takes place between Rama and Ravana, in which Rama kills Ravana and ends his evil rule. As a result, dharma was established on Earth because of Rama's victory over Ravana. The festival commemorates the victory of good over evil.

In the Mahabharata, Vijayadashami also marks the day that the Pandava warrior Arjuna defeats the Kauravas. The epic tells the story of the Pandava brothers who are known to have spent their thirteenth year of exile under concealed identity in Matsya, the kingdom of Virata. Before going to Virata, they are known to have hung their celestial weapons in a shami tree for safekeeping for a year. It was during this time that Kauravas decided to attack the kingdom in which Arjuna retrieved the weapons from the Shami tree and defeated the entire Kaurava army.

== History ==
=== Ravana Dahan ===
The destruction of the effigy of Ravana is an important tradition of Vijayadashami, depicting the victory of Lord Rama over Ravana or the victory of good over evil. It normally occurs on the tenth day of Navratri, concluding the enactment of Ramlila based on the Ramayana epic.

The history behind the Ravana Dahan is uncertain. It is believed that the organized celebration of this custom dates back to 1948 in Ranchi, where families displaced from Pakistan during the time of Partition observed this ritual of burning effigies. In time, it evolved into a grand celebration. Nowadays, Ravana Dahan continues to be a part of Dussehra festival in many parts of India.

== Regional variations ==
=== Northern India ===
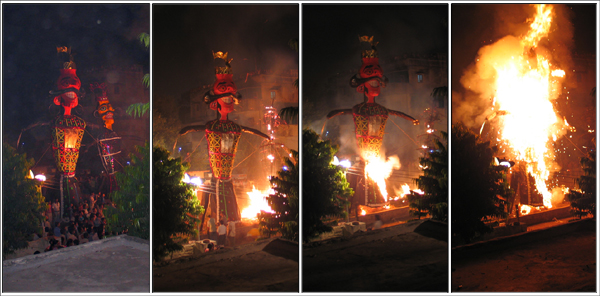
Dasara is observed with the burning of Ravana effigies.

In most of Northern India, Vijayadashami is celebrated in honour of Lord Rama. In many places, the Ramlila, a dramatic performance on story of Rama is enacted over the 9 days leading up to the festival. The performance is inspired from the Ramcharitmanas, a Hindu text written by Tulsidas. Effigies of the demons Ravana, Kumbhakarna and Meghnath are also created and burnt on bonfires in the evening. In other cities, such as Varanasi, the entire story is freely acted out by performance-artists before the public every evening for a month.

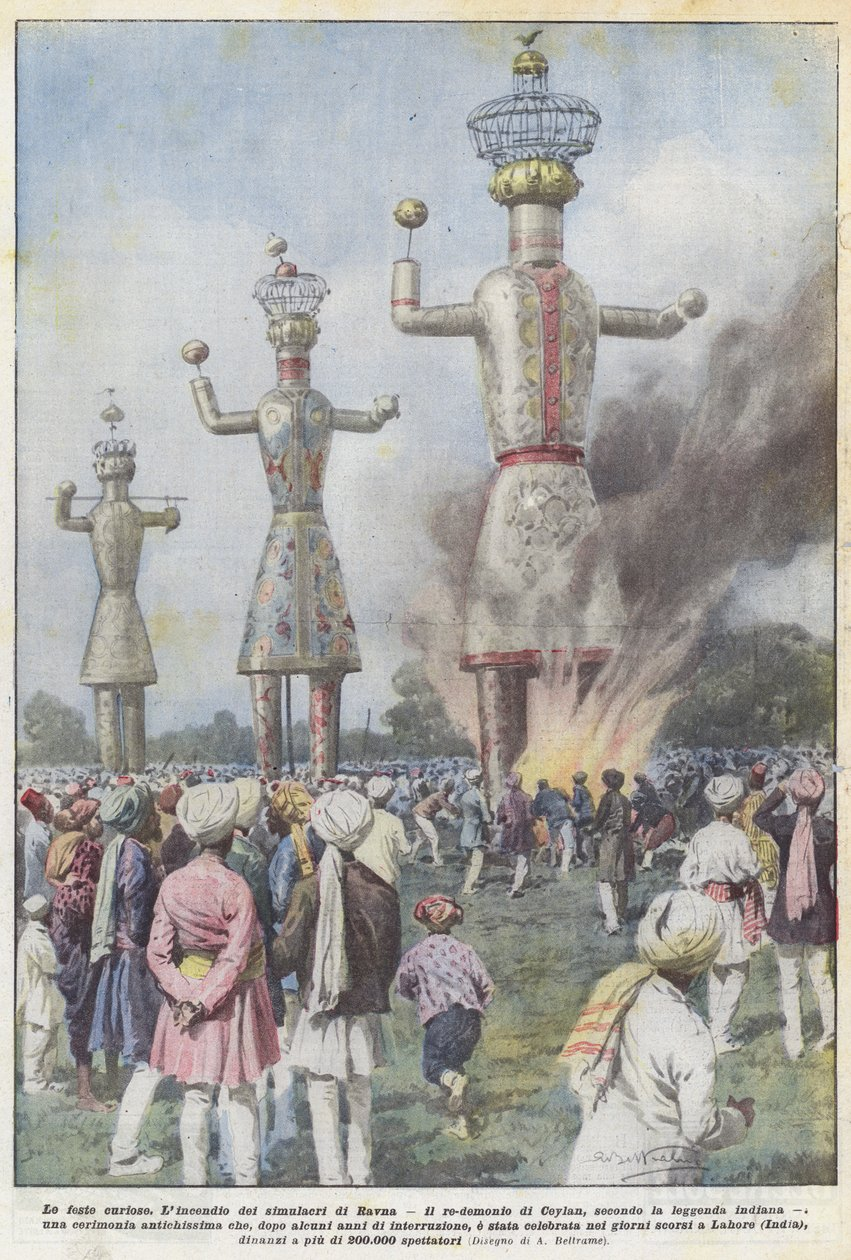
Colour lithograph depicting a Ravan Davan event during Dussehra celebrations in Minto Park, Lahore, by Achille Beltrame, 1923

The performance arts tradition during the Dussehra festival was inscribed by UNESCO (United Nations Educational, Scientific and Cultural Organization) as one of the "Intangible Cultural Heritage of Humanity" in 2008. It is celebrated across Northern India for Dussehra, but particularly in historically important Hindu cities of Ayodhya, Varanasi, Vrindavan, Almora, Satna and Madhubani. The festival and dramatic enactment of the virtues versus vices filled story is organised by communities in hundreds of small villages and towns, attracting a mix of audiences from different social, gender and economic backgrounds. In many parts of India, the audience and villagers join in and participate spontaneously, helping the artists, others helping with stage setup, make-up, effigies, and lights. These arts come to a close on the night of Dussehra, when the victory of Rama is celebrated by burning the effigies of the evil Ravana and his allies.

==== Himachal Pradesh ====
Kullu Dussehra is celebrated in the Kullu valley of Himachal Pradesh and is regionally notable for its large fair and parade witnessed by an estimated half a million people. The festival is a symbol of victory of good over evil by Raghunath, and is celebrated like elsewhere in the Indian subcontinent with a procession. The special feature of the Kullu Dussehra procession is the arrival of floats containing deities from different parts of the nearby regions and their journey to Kullu.

=== Southern India ===
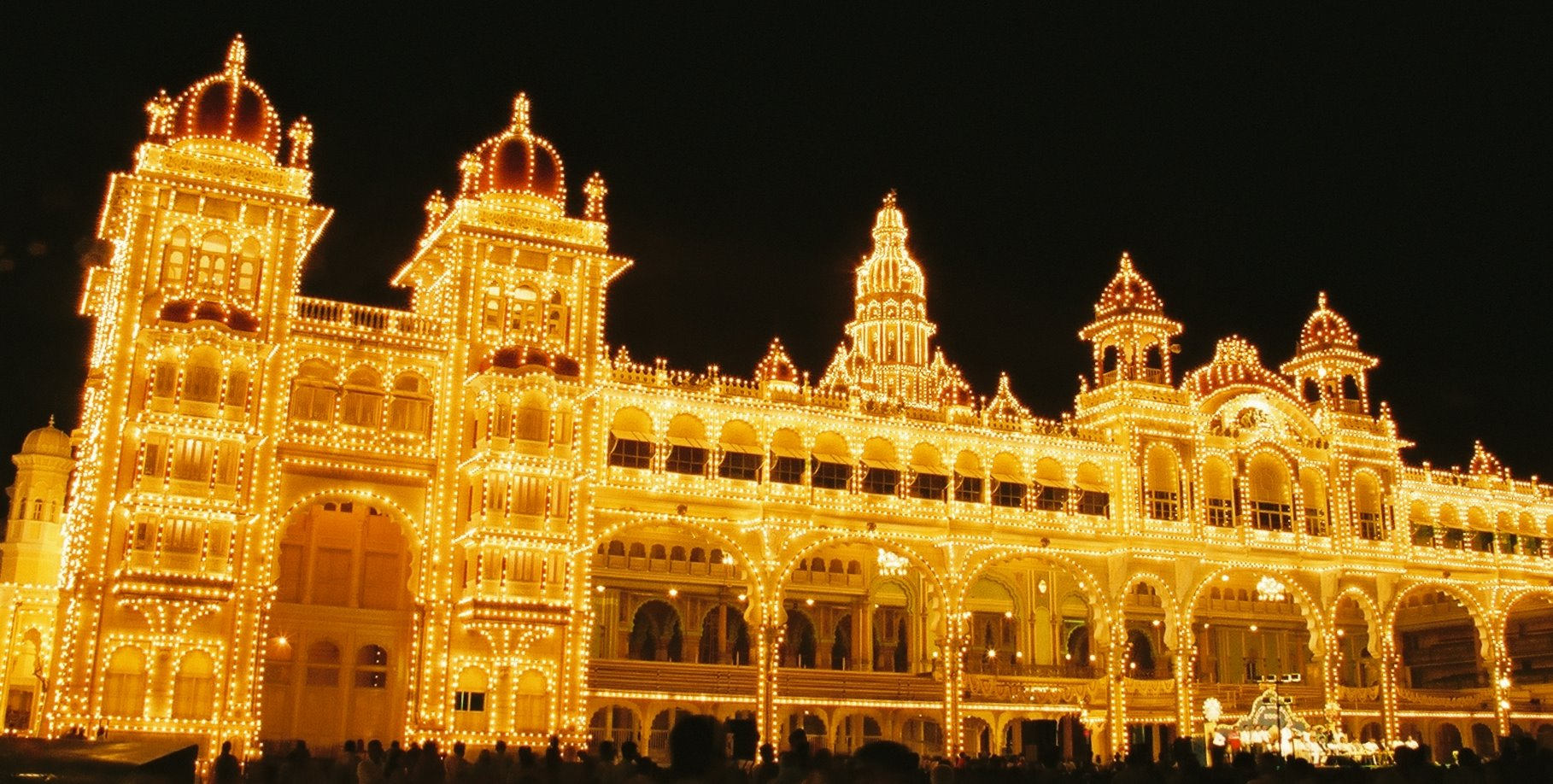
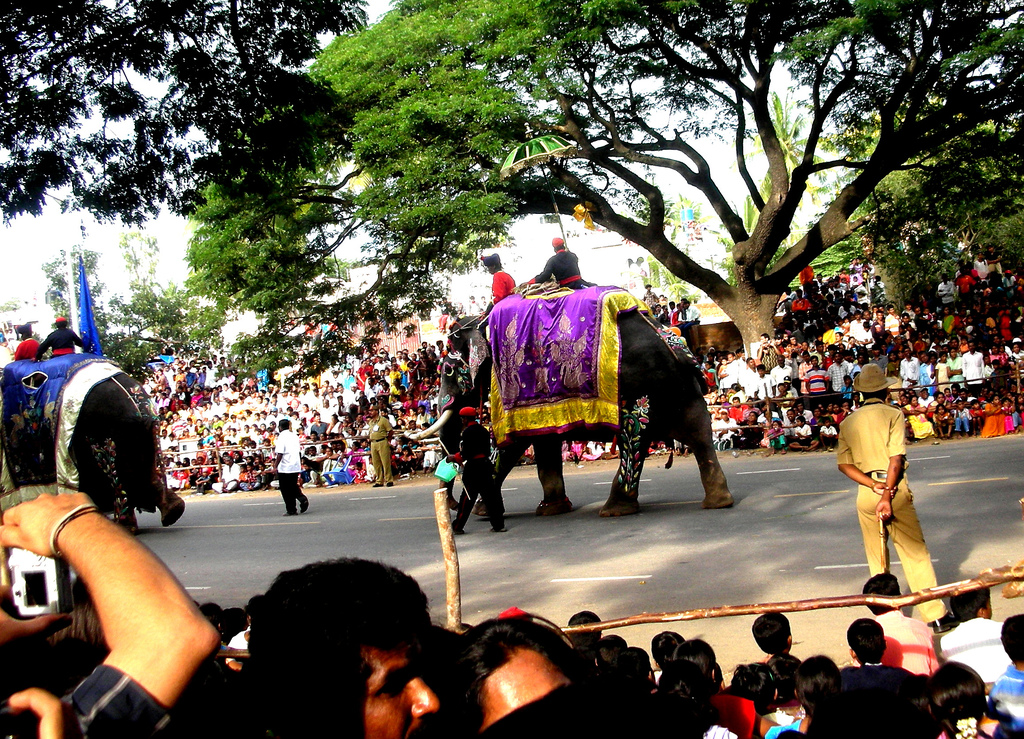
Mysore Dasara procession and celebrations in Karnataka are a major tourist attraction.

Vijayadashami is celebrated in a variety of ways in Southern India. Celebrations range from worshipping Durga, lighting up temples and major forts such as at Mysore, to displaying colourful figurines, known as a gombe habba.

The festival played a historical role in the 14th-century Vijayanagara Empire, where it was called Mahanavami. The Italian traveller Niccolò de' Conti described the festival's intensity and importance as a grandeur religious and martial event with royal support. The event revered Durga as the warrior goddess (some texts refer to her as Chamundeshwari). The celebrations hosted athletic competitions, singing and dancing, fireworks, a pageantry military parade and charitable giving to the public. Portuguese travellers like Domingo Paes and Fernao Nuniz who visited Vijayanagara Empire in the 16th century described the Dasara elephant procession and the Vajra Mushti Kalaga wrestling bouts.

The city of Mysore has traditionally been a major center of Dasara-Vijayadashami celebrations.

This festival is called Dasara in Karnataka and the 10 day festival is celebrated as Shara navaratri where the Goddess in every temple is worshiped for 10 days in 10 forms with different Alankar/forms to signify different Goddesses avatar. Many cultural programs and competitions are organized in many cities like Mysuru, Shivamoga, Bengaluru etc. On the evening of the last day of the ten-festival, the temple's Goddesses are taken in a procession to mark victory over evil and the completion of the war. People of Karnataka exchange leaves of Shami tree as symbol of gold on 10th day evening marking the win over demon. Another Navaratri tradition in Karnataka has been decorating a part of one's home with art dolls called Gombe or Bombe, similar to Golu dolls of Tamil Nadu. An art-themed Gaarudi Gombe, featuring folk dances that incorporate these dolls, is also a part of the celebration.

Another significant and notable tradition of several Southern Indian regions has been the dedication of this festival to Saraswati, the Hindu goddess of knowledge, learning, music and arts. She is worshipped along with instruments of one's trade during this festival. In Southern India, people maintain, clean and worship their instruments, tools of work and implements of their livelihood during this festival, remembering Goddess Saraswati and Durga.

In Kerala, Vidyarambham festival is celebrated on Vijaya Dasami day. It is also known as Saraswati Puja Day. Major temple associated with Vidyarambham are Cherpu Thiruvullakkavu Temple Thrissur and Panachikkad Temple. A guru draws "Om Hari Sree Ganapathaye Namah" on the tongue of a child using a ring dipped in honey. Child is guided to write Hari Sree mantra on rice kept in Uruli. Children aged 3–4 who are new to school are admitted to school and Anganawadi on Vijayadashami Day.

A unique tradition of Dasara festival in Kulasekrapattinam in Tamil Nadu. Here devotees dress up as god, goddess, beggars and other symbolic figures to fulfill their vow to the deity. Those who disguise themselves as other figures usually observe 41 days of fasting. Unlike normal Dasaras, where Lord Ram kills Ravan, here Goddess Mutharamman (Durga)'s victory over the Bison headed demon Mahishasura is celebrated as "Mahishasura Vadham". Lakhs of devotees flock the coastal town to get Goddess' blessings and to get a glimpse of the Mahishasura Vadham. Dasara in Kulasekrapattinam is different, raw and explains the cultures of Tamil Nadu. Like Kerela School Admissions start on Vijayadashami.

=== Western India ===
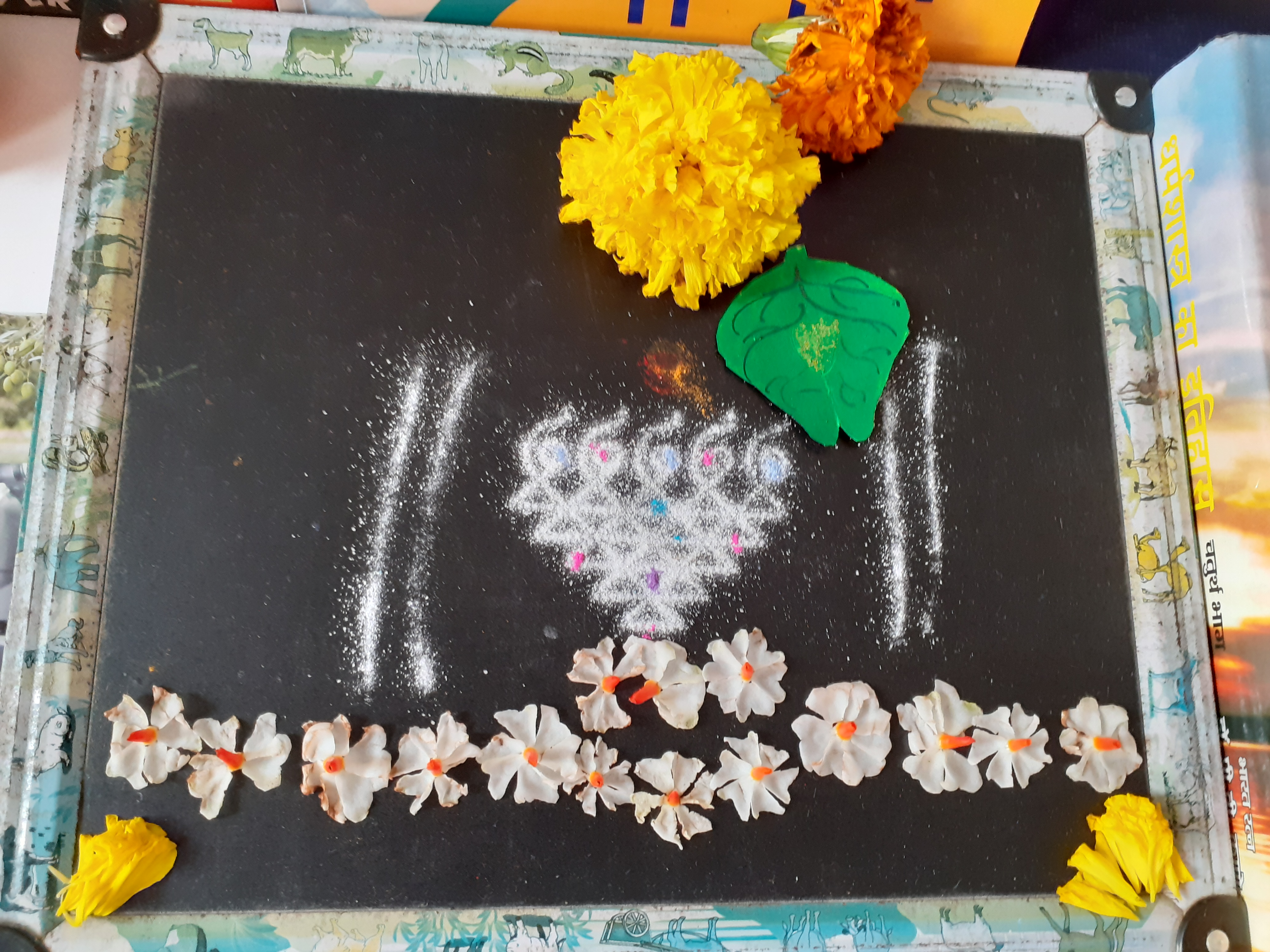
Saraswati puja on Vijayadashami in Maharashtra with symbolic drawing (yantra) of the goddess on a slate.

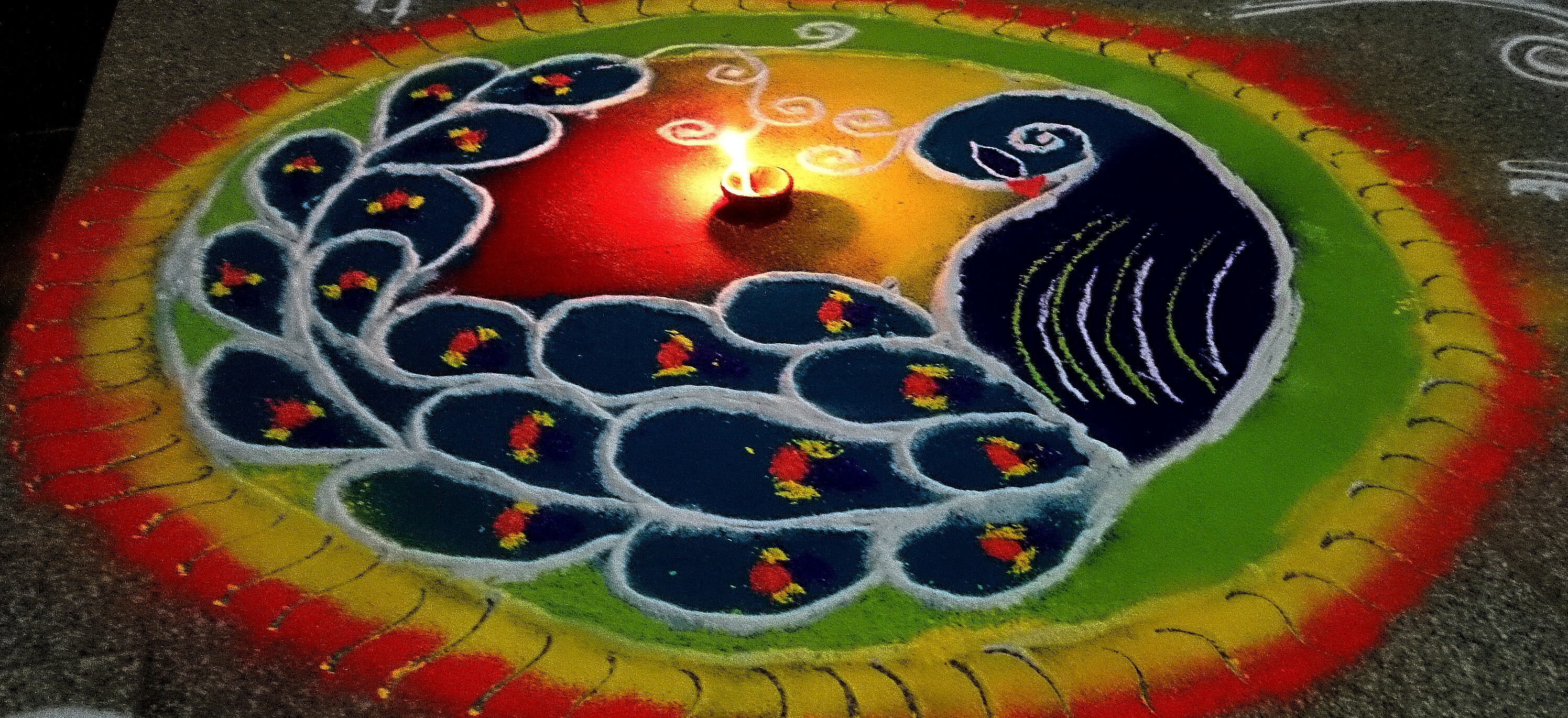
Colorful floor patterns to mark Vijayadashami.

In Gujarat, people engage the popular festival, Navaratri, a nine-day festival that takes place before Vijayadashami. Both the goddess Durga and Rama are revered for their victory over evil. Fasting and prayers at temples are common. A regional dance called Dandiya Raas, that deploys colourfully decorated sticks, and garba, (another type of regional dance) is a part of the festivities through the night.

The Gondi people instead celebrate Ravana by carrying an image of him riding an elephant and singing praises to him, as they consider Ravana as their ancestor and one of their gods. In Goa, this festival is locally known as Dasro in Konkani. It marks Durga's victory over the demon Mahishasur. Insignia known as Taranga play an important role in the festivities, which are sacred umbrellas that symbolize the village deities. At many temples, a dance of the Tarangas is held. Oracles are associated with Dasara in Goa. On this day, a ritual called Seemollanghan of the deities is held. For this people make a symbolic crossing of the border of their village. The icons of deities are carried in a grand procession. The tradition traces its roots to ancient times when kings would cross the border of their kingdom to wage war with the neighbouring kingdom. After Seemollanghan, there is a tradition wherein people exchange Aaptyachi pana. These leave symbolise gold and the ritual is a symbolic representation of the exchange of gold.

The festival is also celebrated as a harvest festival by farmers and has an important association with Agricultural activities. At Dussehra, Kharif crops like rice, guar, cotton, soybean, maize, finger millet, pulses are generally ready for harvest, farmers begin their harvest on the day. Farmers bring crops like Kharif crops from their fields for further processing and for trade. Due to this, daily arrivals of these crops in markets of the country normally increases significantly during this period.

The festival has been historically important in Maharashtra. Maratha forces in 17th and 18th centuries including those of Shivaji and the Peshwas would start their new military campaigns on Dasara. In North Maharashtra this festival is known as Dasara, and on this day people wear new clothes, and touch feet of elderly people and deities of the village temple. The deities installed on the first day of Navaratri are immersed in water. Observers visit each other and exchange sweets. Many communities in Maharashtra including the tribal communities of warli and Kokna exchange leaves of Apta tree as symbol of gold..

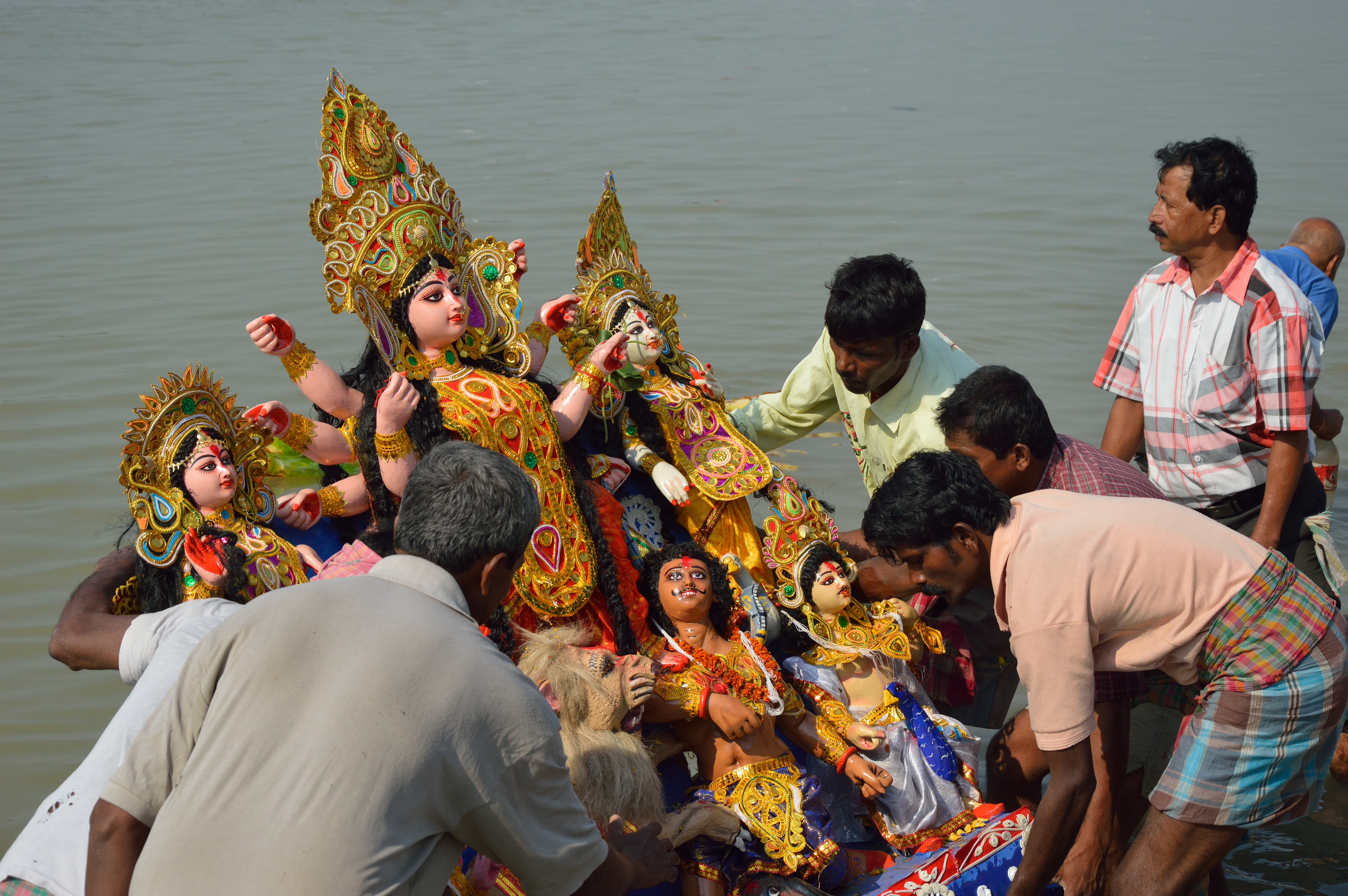
Durga image is immersed into river on Vijayadashami in eastern regions of the Indian subcontinent.

In Mewar region of Rajasthan, both Durga and Rama have been celebrated on Vijayadashami, and it has been a major festival for Rajput warriors.

=== Eastern India ===
In West Bengal Vijaya Dashami is observed as Bijoya Dashomi, immediately after Navami (the ninth and last day of Durga Puja). It is marked by processions in which idols are carried in carriages to a pond, river or ocean for a solemn good-bye to Goddess Durga, along with firecracker bursting, dance, drum beats, music and revelry. Many mark their faces with vermilion (sindoor) or wear red clothing. It is an emotional day for some devotees, especially the Bengali Hindus, and even for many atheists as the congregation sings goodbye songs. When the procession reaches the water, the clay statues of Durga and her four children are immersed; the clay dissolves and they are believed to return to Mount Kailasha with Shiva, and to the cosmos in general. People distribute sweets and gifts and visit friends, relatives and family members to wish them "Subho Vijaya". Some communities such as those near Varanasi mark the eleventh day, called ekadashi, by visiting a Durga temple.

In Bihar Dushehra is celebrated over a period of 10 days. The people worship goddess durga and they setup idols in different places. On the 10th day that is Vijaya Dashmi effigy of Ravana is burnt. In Patna the capital of Bihar, people gather in historical Gandhi Maidan and a huge effigy of Ravan is burnt.

== Nepal ==
Nepalese sculpture deplicting Durga slaying Mahisha, c. 14th century

In Nepal, Bijayadashami (the Nepali pronunciation of Vijayadashami, due to betacism) is the 10th day of the 15-day Dashain festival, which begins on Shukla Paksha and ends on Kojagrat Purnima according to Nepal's national Bikram Sambat calendar. On this day, family members visit their relatives, people return to their ancestral homes, students visit their teachers, and government officials visits head of the state. Many people also visit the president, other government officials, and former king and queen at their residence to receive blessings.

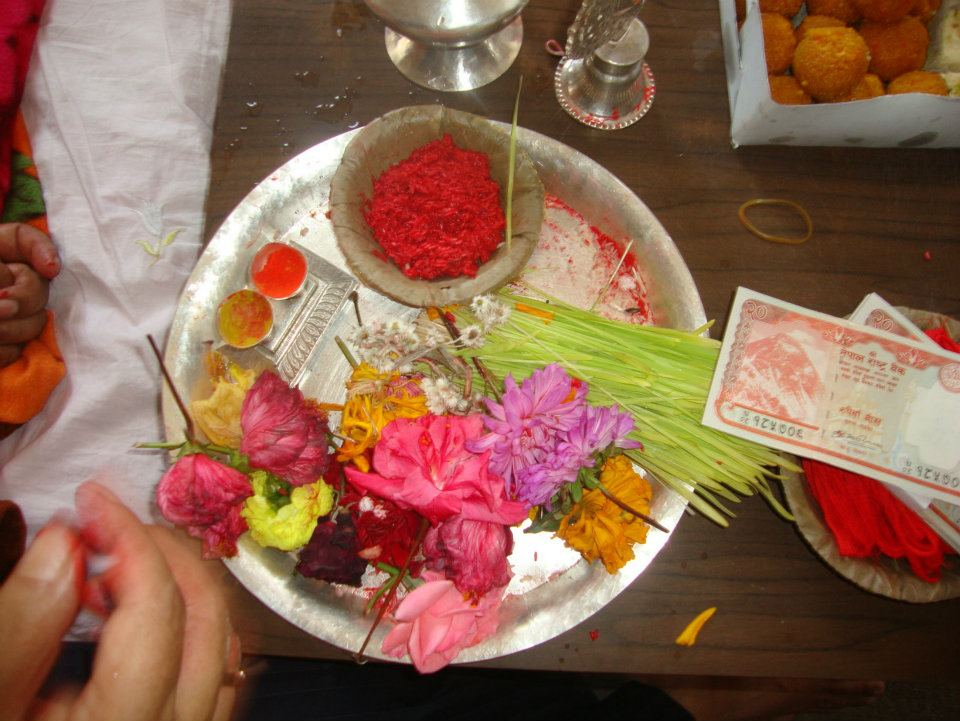
Tika (red), jamara (green), flowers, and dakshina (a monentary gift) arranged on a silver plate

Elders welcome visitors and bless them with good health, success, and prosperity in the year ahead. They apply a tika, a mixture of red or white rice paste, curd, and rice grains, and place jamara (yellow or green barley sprouts) on their heads or behind their ears. Elders also give dakṣiṇā, a small monetary gift, to younger family members. Elders also show respect to women by bowing to their feet, as women are regarded as forms of the goddess Lakshmi.

Although Bijayadashami is the 10th day of Dashain and is entirely dedicated for family blessings, family visits and tika ceremonies continue until the final day of the 15-day-long festival. People continue visiting relatives, receiving tika, and exchanging blessings throughout the remaining days.

=== Outside Nepal ===
Beyond Nepal, Dashain is celebrated by the large ethnic Nepalese population of Bhutan, known as Lhotshampa. The government of Bhutan recognizes Bijayadashami, the 10th day of Dashain, as a public holiday. The King of Bhutan also celebrates the festival by offering tika at the Devi Panchayan Mandir in Thimphu in Nepali traditions.

The festival is also observed in the traditional Nepali manner by large Nepalese communities in Myanmar and the north and northeast regions of India, where Nepali cultural influence is prominent. These include Uttarakhand, Himachal Pradesh, Darjeeling and Kalimpong in West Bengal, Sikkim, and other northeast states of India.

== See also ==
- Ayudha Puja – Hindu observance
- Bathukamma – Flower festival in India
- Dasara elephants – In the Mysore Dasara Festival
- Durga Puja – Annual Hindu festival
- Golu (festive) – Festive display of dolls in India
- Kullu Dussehra – Popular festival celebrated in the state of Himachal Pradesh, India
- Madikeri Dasara – Dasara festival
- Navaratri – Hindu festival to honour goddess Durga
- Prasada – Religious food offered in Hinduism and Sikhism temples
- Puja (Hinduism) – Prayer ritual in Hinduism
- Vidyāraṃbhaṃ – Hindu rite of passage for young children
- Zatra – Konkani language term
