= Madikeri =

Madikeri Mercara
- City
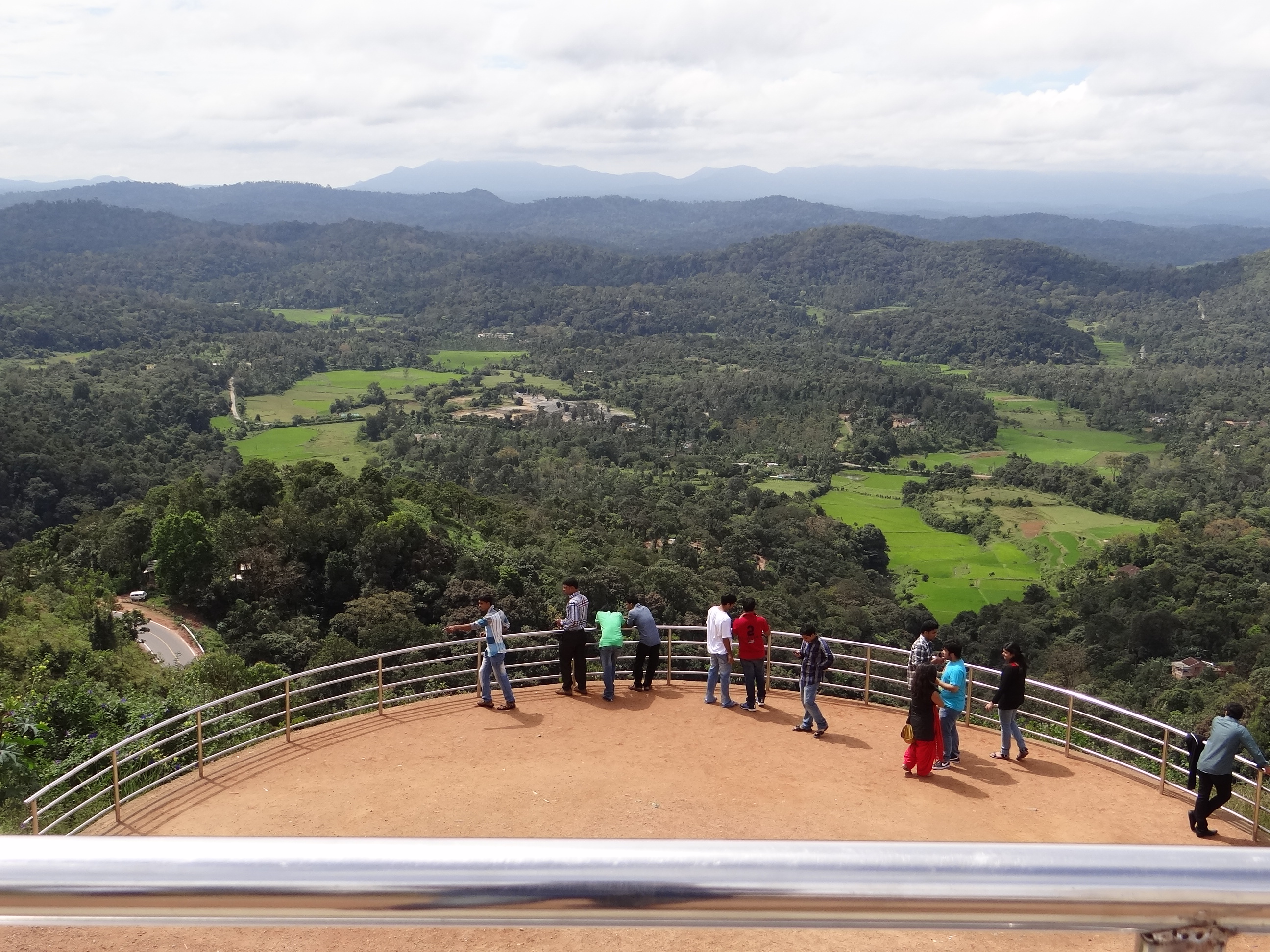
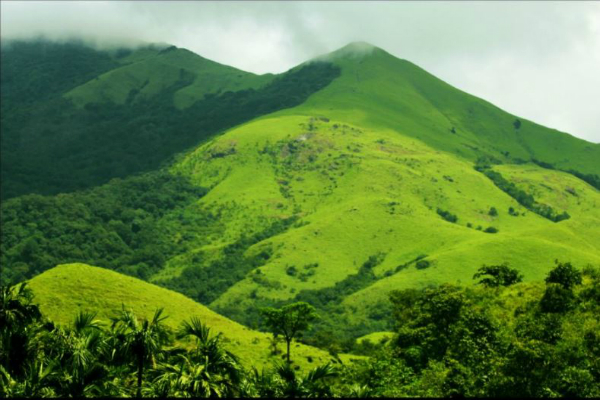
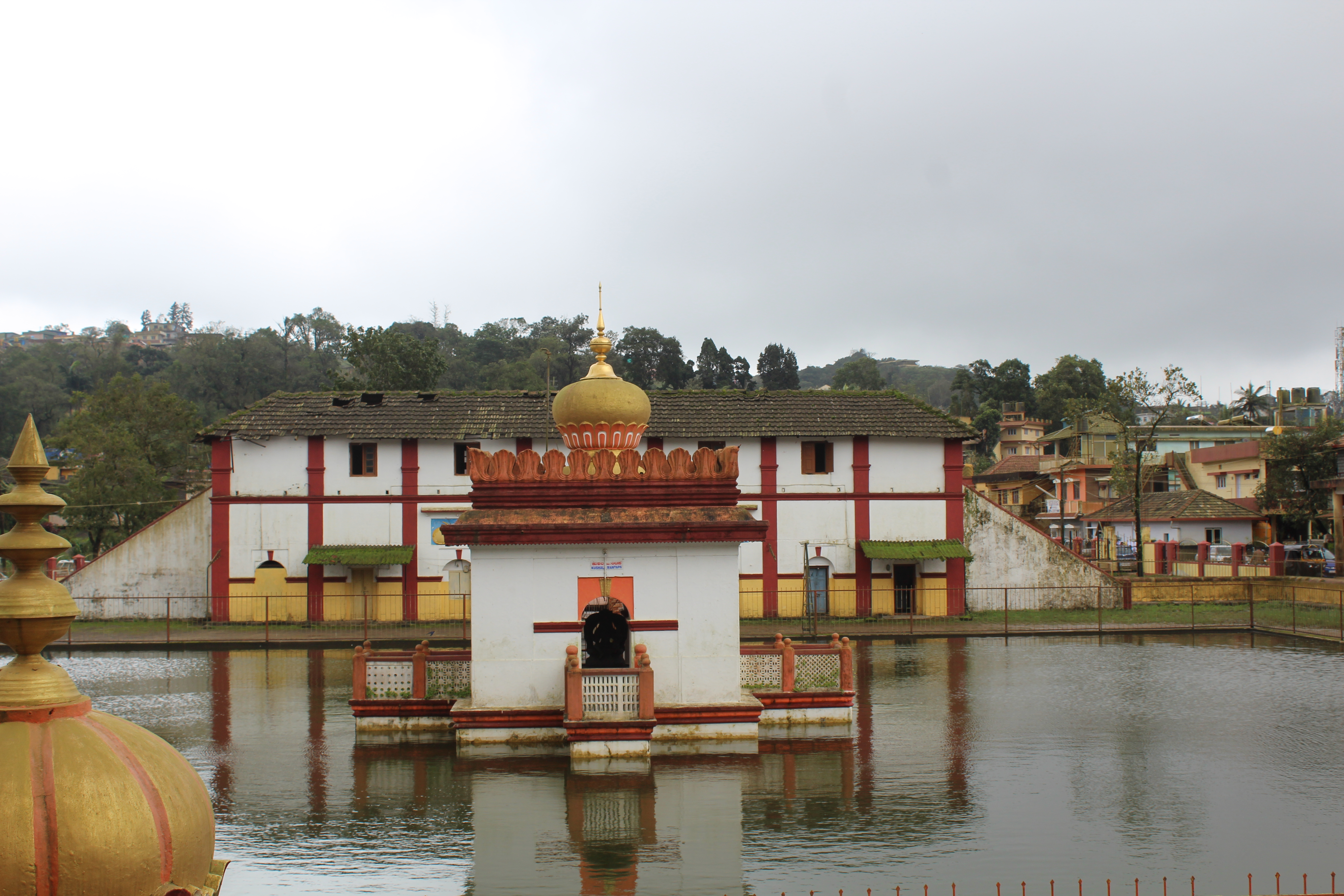
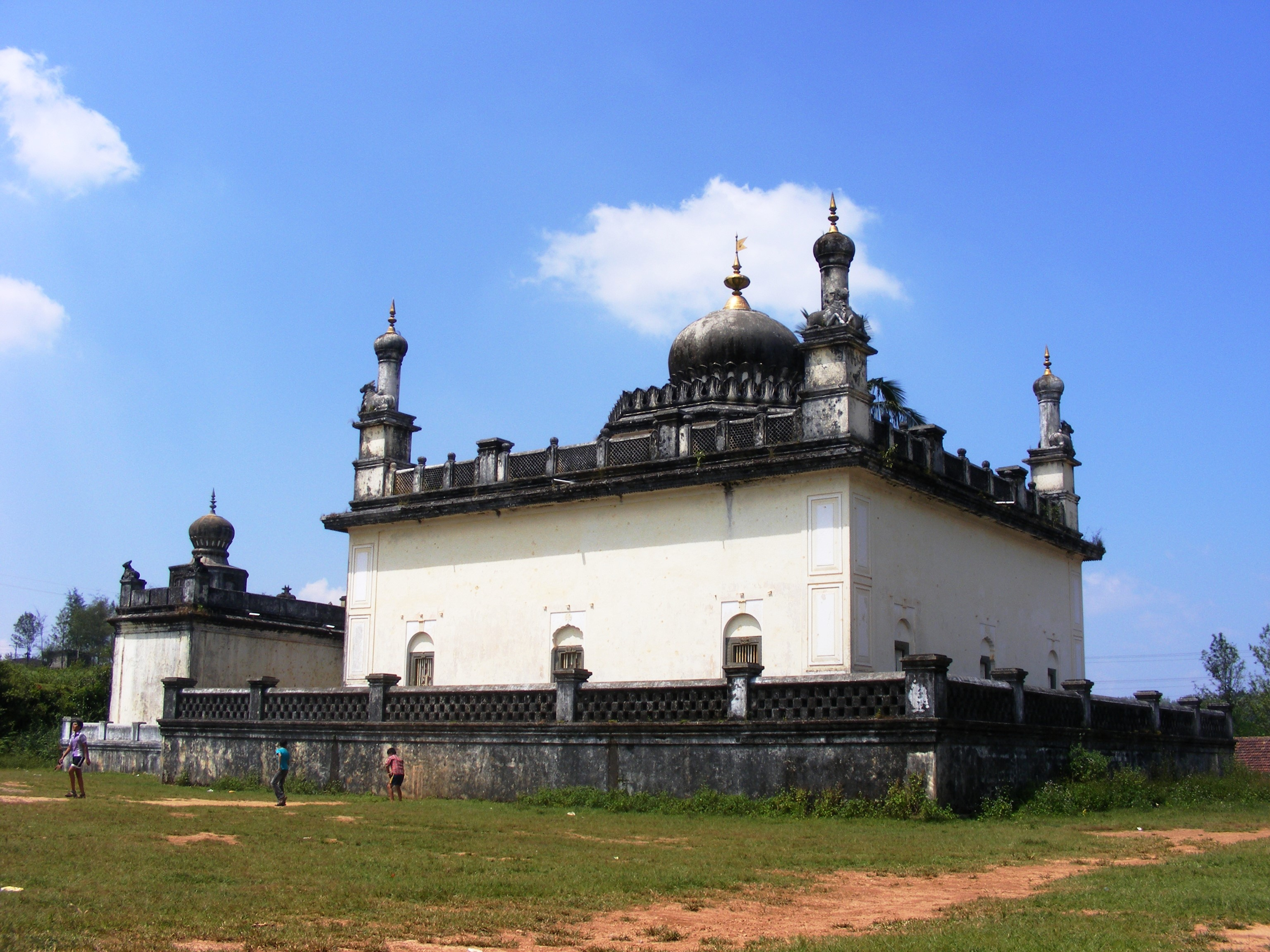
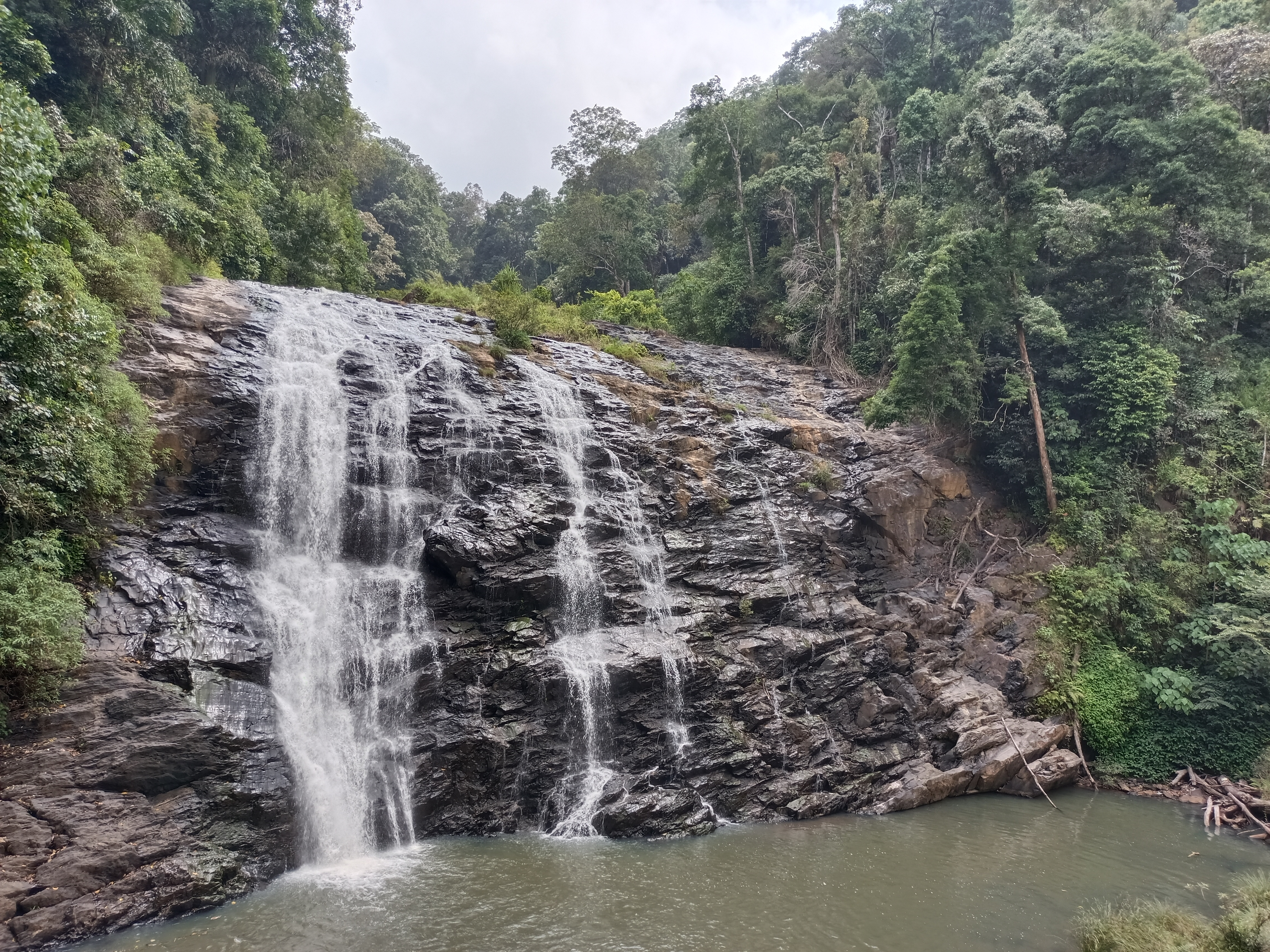
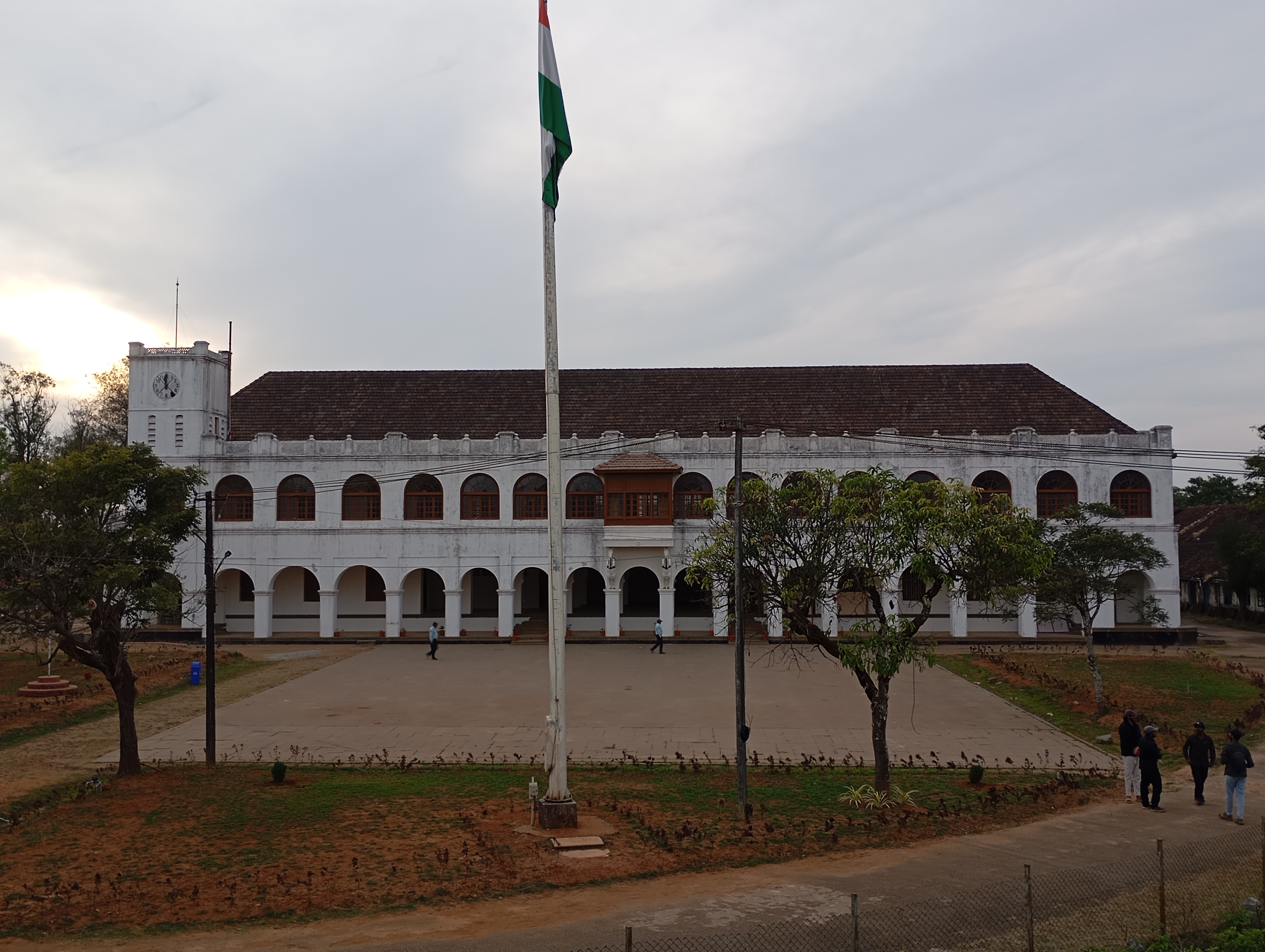
- From top, left to right: Raja's Seat View Point, Grasslands in Kumara Parvatha, Omkareshwara Temple, Gaddige (Raja’s tomb), Abbey Waterfalls, Madikeri Palace
- Nickname: Misty City of Karnataka
- Interactive map of Madikeri
- Coordinates: 12.4209°N 75.7397°E
- Country: India
- State: Karnataka
- District: Kodagu
- Muddurajana Keri: 1681
- Founder: Mudduraja

Government
  - Body: City Municipal Council
  - CMC Commissioner: Ramesh H R

Area
  - City: 17.04 km^{2} (6.58 sq mi)
  - Rural: 1,435.32 km^{2} (554.18 sq mi)
- Elevation: 1,170 m (3,840 ft)

Population (2011)
  - City: 33,381
  - Density: 1,959/km^{2} (5,074/sq mi)
  - Rural: 113,202
- Time zone: UTC+5:30 (IST)
- PIN: 571201, 571202
- Telephone code: 08272
- Vehicle registration: KA-12
- Official language: Kannada
- Website: madikericity.mrc.gov.in

Madikeri (Kodava: [mɐɖikeːri]), earlier called as Mercara is city and headquarters of Kodagu district in the Karnataka state of India. It is recognised as one of the world's eight "hottest hotspots" of biological diversity and is also a UNESCO World Heritage Site. The city is ranked 1st in India for clean air and air quality index in 2024.

== Etymology ==
Madikeri was known as Muddu Raja Keri, which meant Mudduraja's town, was named after the prominent Haleri king Mudduraja who ruled Kodagu from 1633 to 1687. From 1834, during the British Raj, it was called Mercara. It was later renamed to Madikeri by the Government of Mysore.

== History ==
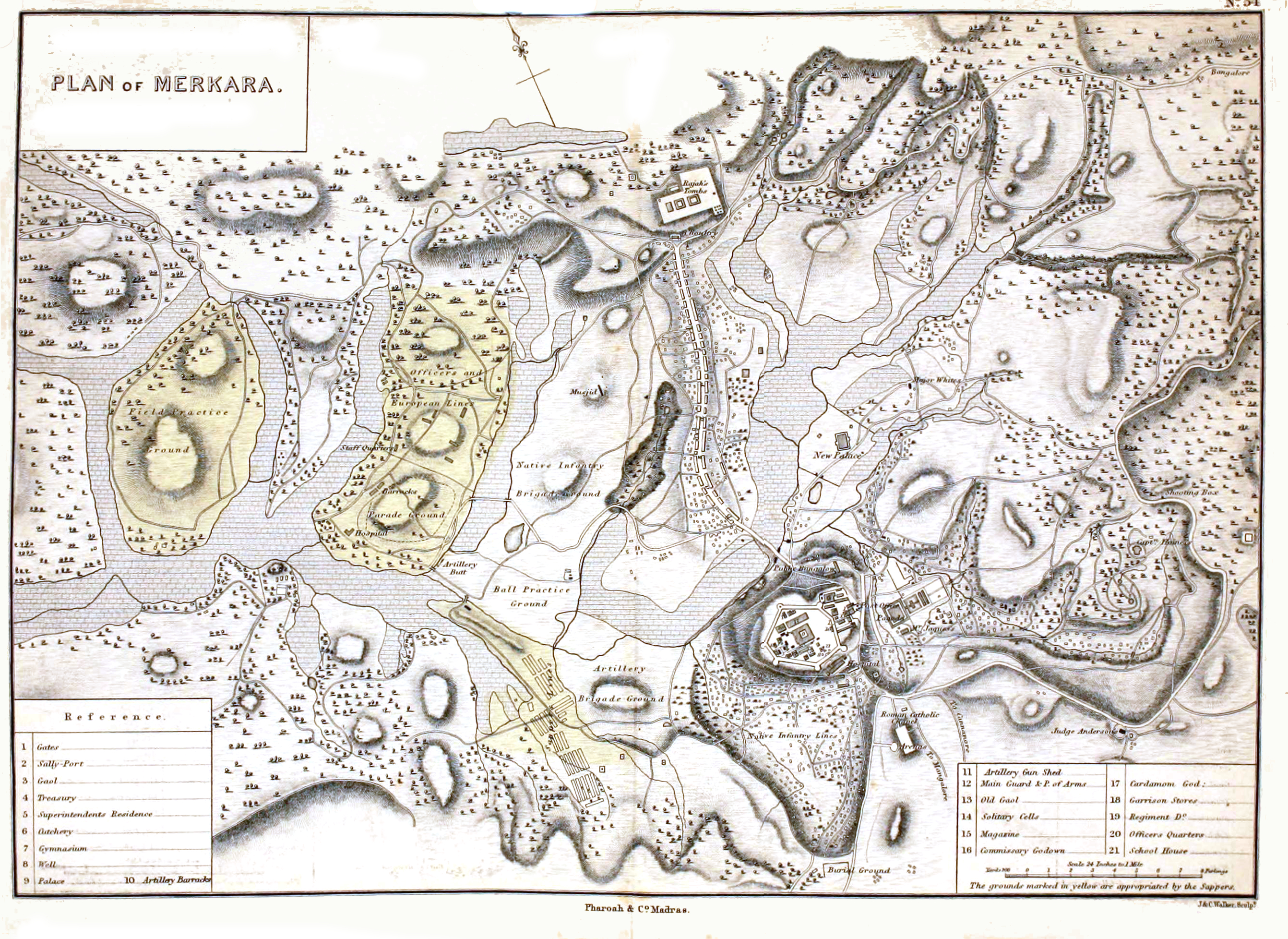
Map c. 1854

The history of Madikeri is related to the history of Kodagu. From the 2nd to the 6th century AD, the northern part of Kodagu was ruled by Kadambas. The southern part of Kodagu was ruled by Gangas from the 4th to the 11th century. After defeating the Gangas in the 11th century, Cholas became the rulers of Kodagu. In the 12th century, the Cholas lost Kodagu to the Hoysalas. Kodagu fell to the Vijayanagar kings in the 14th century.

After their fall, the local chieftains from Kodava community (Palegars) started ruling their areas directly. They appointed Haleri Dynasty founder Veeraraju, (Nephew of Ikkeri Sadashiva Nayaka who were descendants of Talakadu Ganga Dynasty) as ruler. In the year 1700 AD Ikkeri Somashekara Nayaka gifted Puttur and Amara Sullia Magnes of Tulunadu to Haleri Kings.

Descendants of Veeraraju who are known as "Haleri Dynasty" ruled Kodagu from 1600 to 1834 AD. Haleri king Mudduraja built the Fort in Madikeri and made it as their capital. Mudduraja, the third Haleri king started levelling the land around Madikeri and built a fort in the year 1681. Madikeri Fort which was original built of mud and was replaced by Tipu Sultan. Kodagu became a part of British India after 1834 AD.

== Demographics ==
As of the 2011 India census, Madikeri had a population of 33,381. Males constitute 57.2% of the population and females 42.8%. Madikeri had an average literacy rate of 85%, higher than the national average of 69.3: male literacy was 83%, and female literacy 80%. 11% of the population was under 6 years of age.

== Geography and climate ==
Madikeri features a tropical highland climate as it has an elevation of 1,170 m (3,840 ft). Madikeri is located at 12.42°N 75.73°E. Madikeri lies in the Western Ghats and is a popular hill station. Nearest major cities are Hassan (110 kilometres (68 mi)) to the north, Mangalore (138 kilometres (86 mi)) to the north-west, Mysore (120 kilometres (75 mi)) to the east and Kannur of Kerala to the west (112 km (70 mi)). The nearest international airport is Kannur International Airport which is 90 km (56 mi) away.

The mean daily minimum temperature is lowest in January at about 11 °C (52 °F). Maximum temperature in summer is around 24 to 27 °C (75 to 81 °F). With the onset of the south-west monsoon, the temperature decreases in June and the weather becomes chilly. The lowest temperature recorded is 4.5 °C (40.1 °F).

Climate data for Madikeri (1981–2010, extremes 1901–2012)
Month	Jan	Feb	Mar	Apr	May	Jun	Jul	Aug	Sep	Oct	Nov	Dec	Year
Record high °C (°F)	31.7 (89.1)	32.1 (89.8)	34.2 (93.6)	34.2 (93.6)	35.0 (95.0)	32.2 (90.0)	28.9 (84.0)	31.0 (87.8)	30.0 (86.0)	30.3 (86.5)	28.5 (83.3)	29.0 (84.2)	35.0 (95.0)
Mean daily maximum °C (°F)	26.4 (79.5)	28.2 (82.8)	29.8 (85.6)	29.4 (84.9)	27.5 (81.5)	23.3 (73.9)	21.6 (70.9)	21.6 (70.9)	23.6 (74.5)	25.0 (77.0)	25.3 (77.5)	25.3 (77.5)	25.6 (78.1)
Mean daily minimum °C (°F)	12.4 (54.3)	13.1 (55.6)	15.0 (59.0)	17.5 (63.5)	18.1 (64.6)	17.6 (63.7)	17.2 (63.0)	17.2 (63.0)	17.1 (62.8)	16.9 (62.4)	15.6 (60.1)	13.2 (55.8)	15.9 (60.6)
Record low °C (°F)	4.8 (40.6)	5.1 (41.2)	7.6 (45.7)	10.6 (51.1)	9.4 (48.9)	9.2 (48.6)	8.8 (47.8)	9.5 (49.1)	10.0 (50.0)	10.6 (51.1)	7.9 (46.2)	5.5 (41.9)	4.8 (40.6)
Average rainfall mm (inches)	1.6 (0.06)	3.0 (0.12)	15.0 (0.59)	65.3 (2.57)	128.7 (5.07)	646.3 (25.44)	952.5 (37.50)	821.0 (32.32)	274.7 (10.81)	211.0 (8.31)	70.8 (2.79)	20.0 (0.79)	3,210 (126.38)
Average rainy days	0.2	0.3	1.6	5.0	7.8	22.2	27.0	26.2	16.2	12.2	4.4	1.1	124.1
Average relative humidity (%) (at 17:30 IST)	58	55	57	69	77	90	93	93	88	83	74	65	76
Source: India Meteorological Department

In 2022, Madikeri hobli received an annual rainfall of 3,957 millimetres (155.8 in).

In the year 2024, Madikeri hobli received 3,878 millimetres (152.7 in) of rainfall.

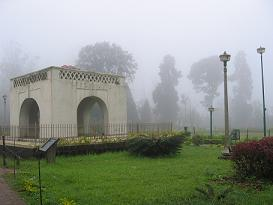
Raja's Seat, one of the major tourist attractions in Madikeri

In 2025, Madikeri received 3,885.1 millimetres (152.96 in) of annual rainfall.

== Transportation ==
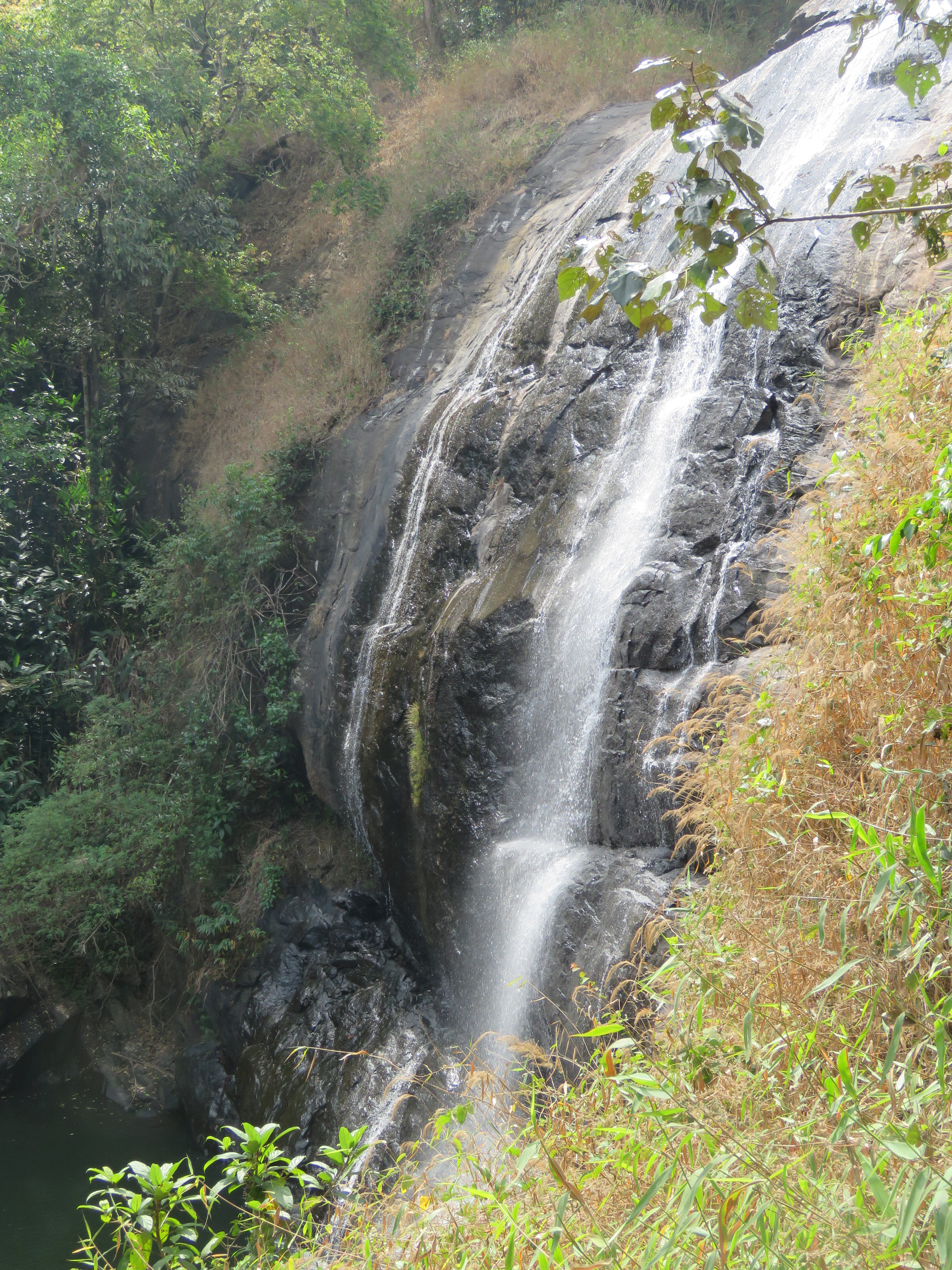
Chelavara Falls near Virajpet

The town has only one mode of transport; The Roadways. Public transport is maintained by buses of KSRTC and other private buses. It also houses a KSRTC Bus Depot under Puttur division. Inter-district and interstate buses are handled by KSRTC, providing connectivity to cities like Mangalore, Mysore, Bengaluru, Hubli, Madurai, Coimbatore and many more other minor cities. Nearest international airports are Kannur International Airport and Mangalore International Airport at 90 km and 140 km, respectively.

=== Highways ===
The SH-88 was upgraded to NH-275 (subsidiary of NH-75) making it the only National Highway passing through the district of Kodagu. NH-275 connects Madikeri to Mysore and Bengaluru due east and to Mangalore due west. Other state highways passing through Madikeri are SH-27 (Virajpet-Byndoor) and SH-89 (Madikeri-Kutta).

== Tourist attractions ==
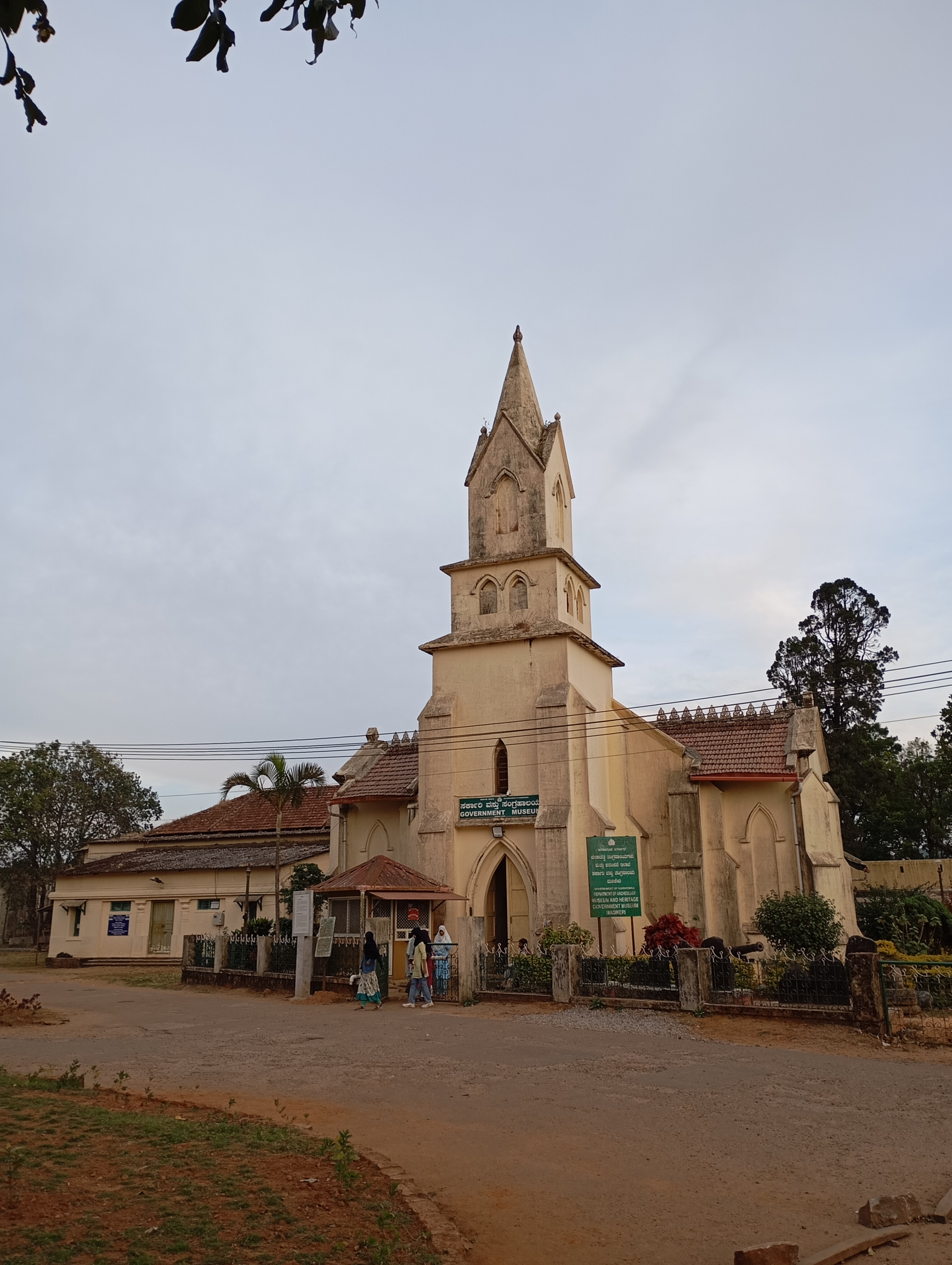
Government Museum in Madikeri, formerly St. Mark's Church

- Raja's Seat
- Sri Omkareshwara Temple
- Madikeri Fort
- Gaddide (Raja's Tomb)
- General Thimmaiah War Museum
- Abbey Falls
- Mandalpatti view point
- Pushpagiri Wildlife Sanctuary

== See also ==
- Kodagu Institute of Medical Sciences
- Sakleshpur
- Kodava
- Talakaveri
