= Temples of Karnataka =

Temples of the Indian State of Karnataka illustrate the variety of architecture prevalent in various periods. The architectural designs have found a distinguished place in forming a true atmosphere of devotion for spiritual attainment. Three of the Hoyasala temples in Karnataka, Belur, Halebid, and Somanathapu, were declared as UNESCO World Heritatge sites on 18 September 2023.

In March 2025, the Karnataka Government has an e-prasad programme for devotees who can receive prasad online by booking at csc.devalayas.com website.

== Most famous temples of Karnataka ==
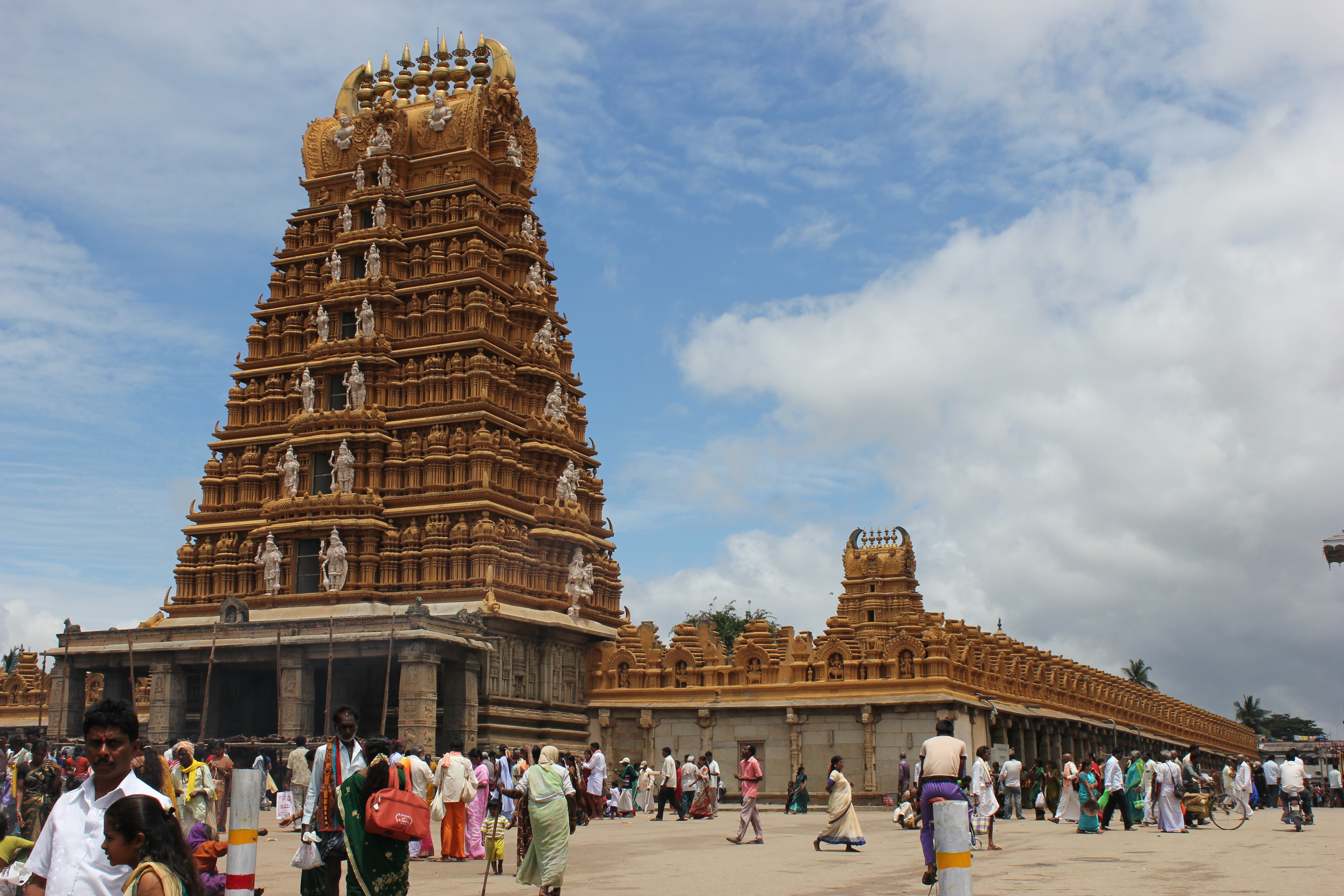
Nanjangud, Mysore

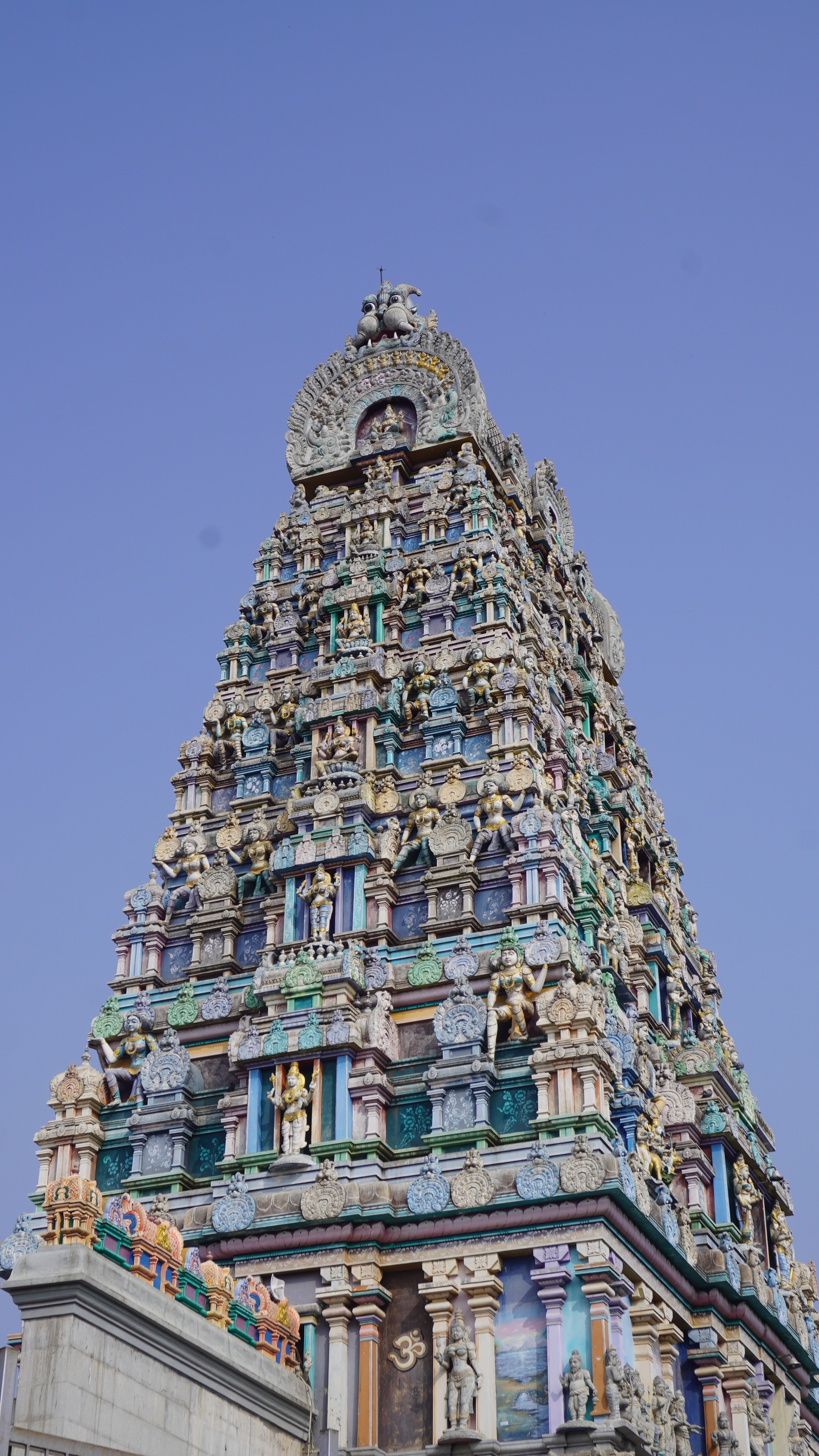
Sri Jnanakshi Rajarajeshwari Temple, Bengaluru

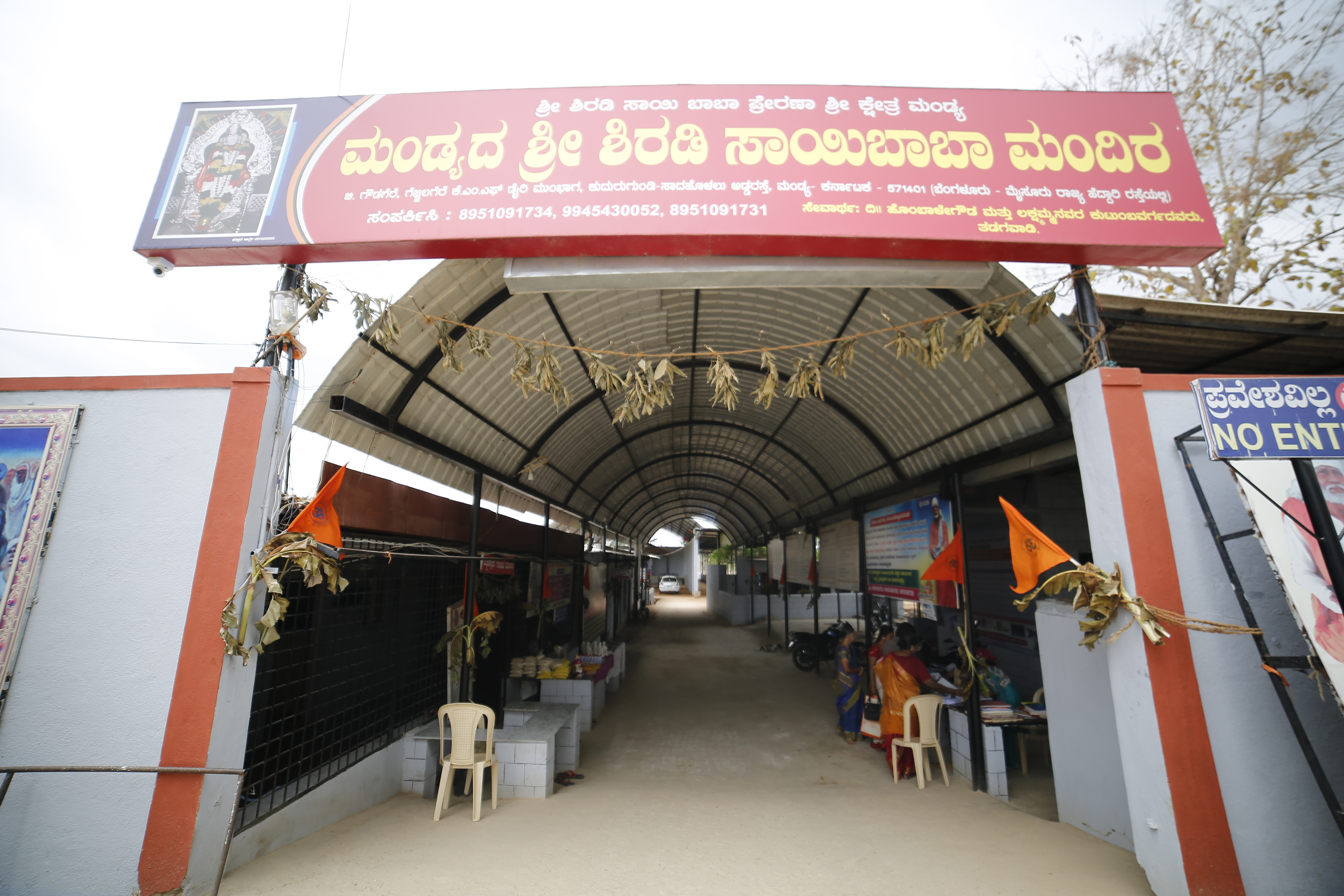
Mandyada Sri Shiradi Sai Baba Mandir, Mandya

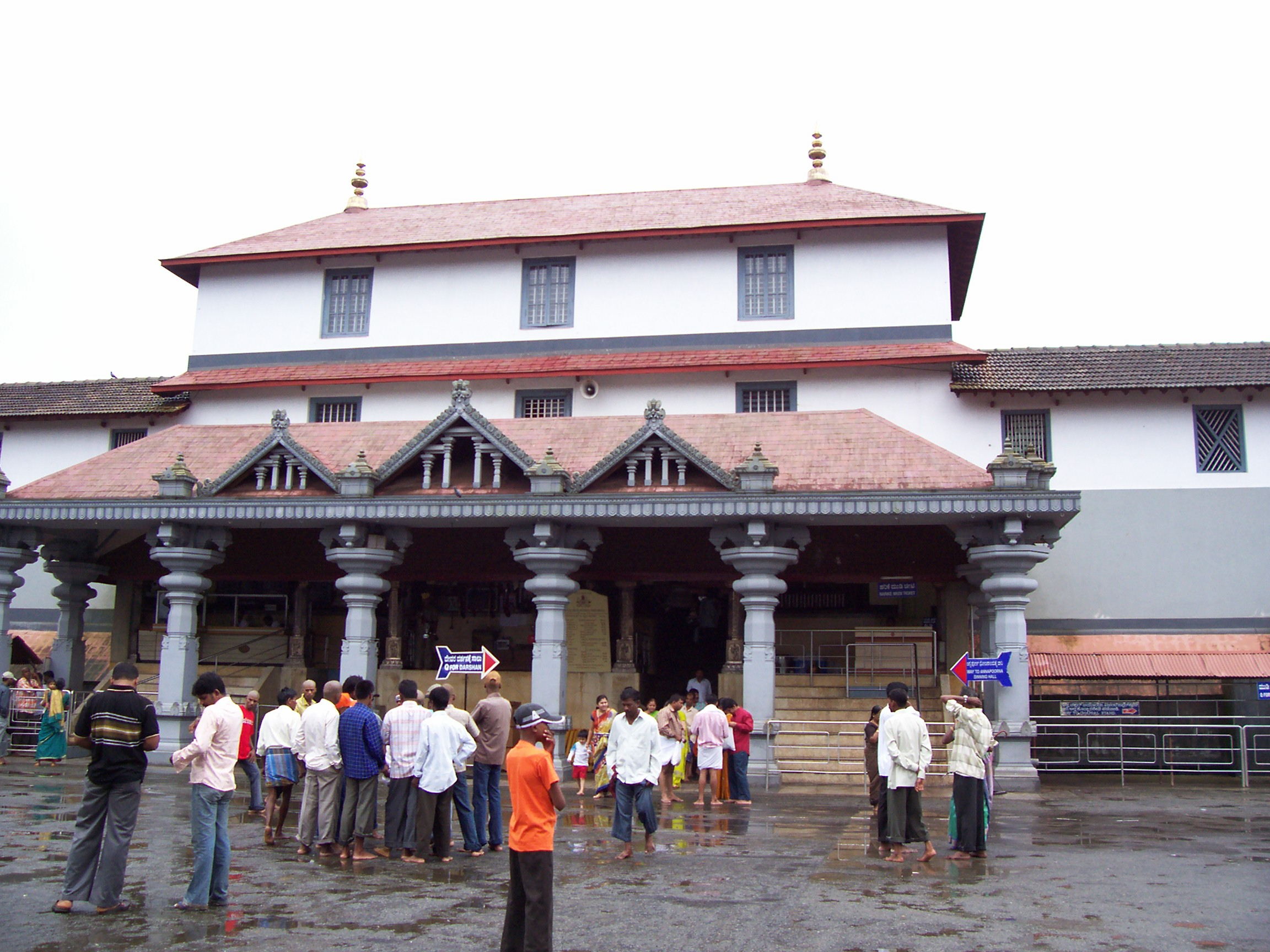
Manjunatheshwara Temple, Dharmasthala

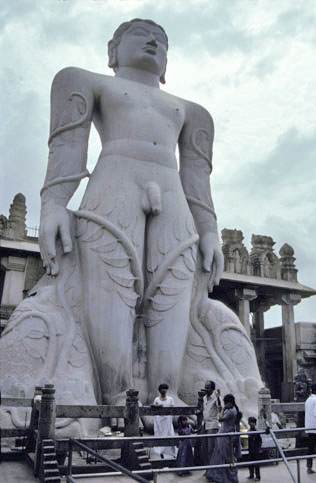
The statue of Gomatheswara, Shravanabelagola Vindyagiri Hill

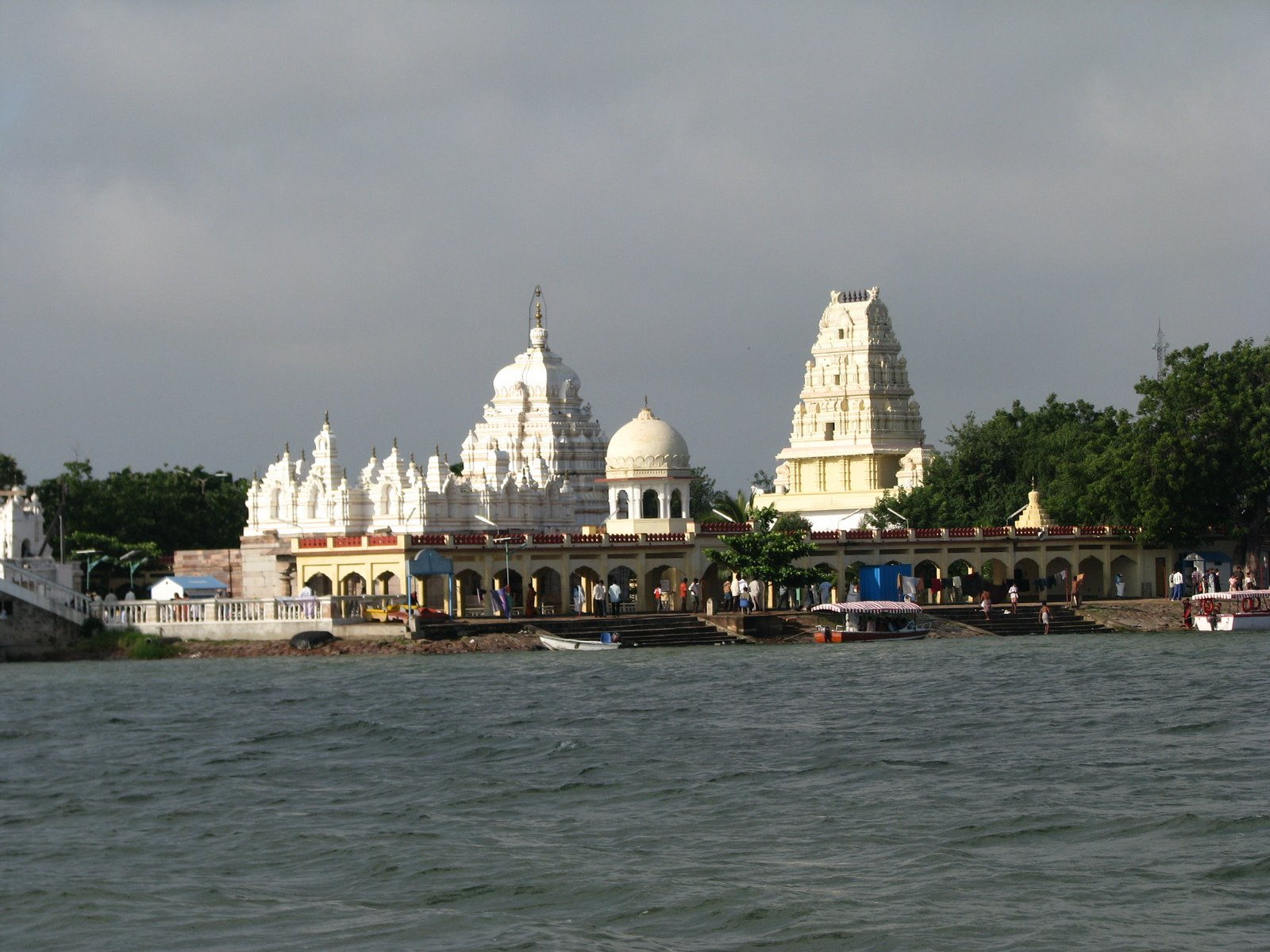
Kudala Sangama in Bagalkot district, North Karnataka, where Basavanna's samadhi is located

- Annapoorneshwari Temple, Horanadu, Chikkamagalur district
- Chamundeswari Temple, Mysore
- Chennakesava Temple, Belur, Hassan
- Durga Parameshwari Temple, Kateelu
- Goravanahalli Mahalakshmi Temple
- Gokarnanatheshwara Temple Kudroli, Mangaluru
- Gude mahalingeshwara Temple, Kundapura, Udupi dist
- Hasanamba Temple, Hassan
- Hoysaleswara Temple, Halebidu, Hassan
- International Society for Krishna Consciousness (ISKCON) Temple, Bangalore
- Jnanakshi Rajarajeswari Temple, Bengaluru
- Kadri Manjunatha Temple, Mangaluru
- Kollur Mookambika Temple, Kollur
- Kudalasangama
- Lakshmi Chandralamba Parameshwari, Sannati
- Lakshmi Devi Temple, Doddagaddavalli
- Mahalakshmi Temple, Kallur
- Mahabaleshwar Temple, Gokarna, Uttara Kannada
- Mahadeshwara Temple, Mahadeshwara Hills, Chamarajanagar,
- Mangaladevi Temple, Mangaluru
- Manjunatha Swamy Temple, Dharmasthala, Dakshina Kannada
- Murudeshwara Temple, Murudeshwar
- Nanjundeshwara Temple, Nanjanagud
- Narasimha swamy Temple, Seebi, Tumkur
- Navagraha Jain Temple, Hubli
- Padutirupathi Venkataramana Temple, Karkala
- Polali Rajarajeshwari Temple, Dakshina Kannada
- Puttur Shree Mahalingeshwara Temple, Puttur, Dakshina Kannada
- Ranganathaswamy Temple, Srirangapatna
- Shri Sulebhavi Mahalakshmi Temple
- Santhoor Subramanya Temple
- Sirsi Marikamba Temple, Sirsi
- Sringeri Sharada Peetham, Sringeri
- Subramanya Temple, Kukke Subramanya
- Udupi Sri Krishna Matha, Udupi
- Virupaksha Temple, Hampi

== Architecture ==
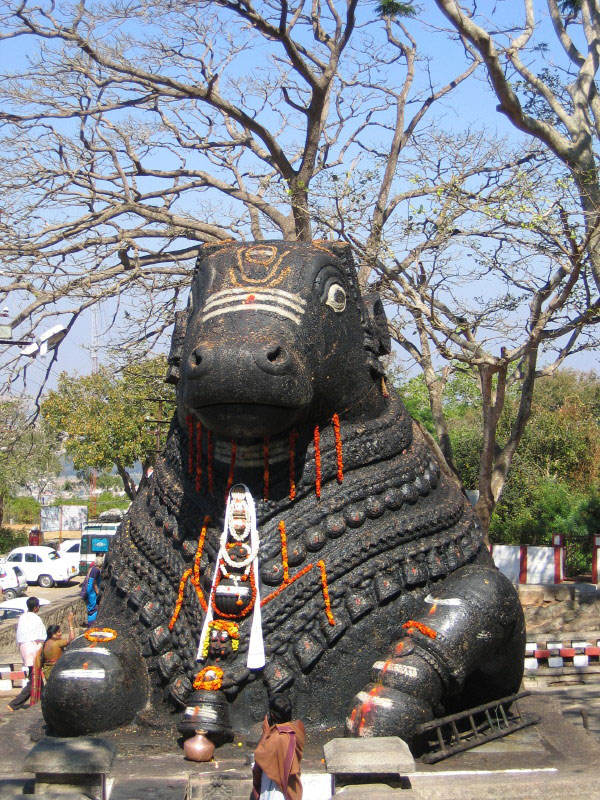
An idol of Nandi in Mysore, a common sculpture found in any temple of Karnataka

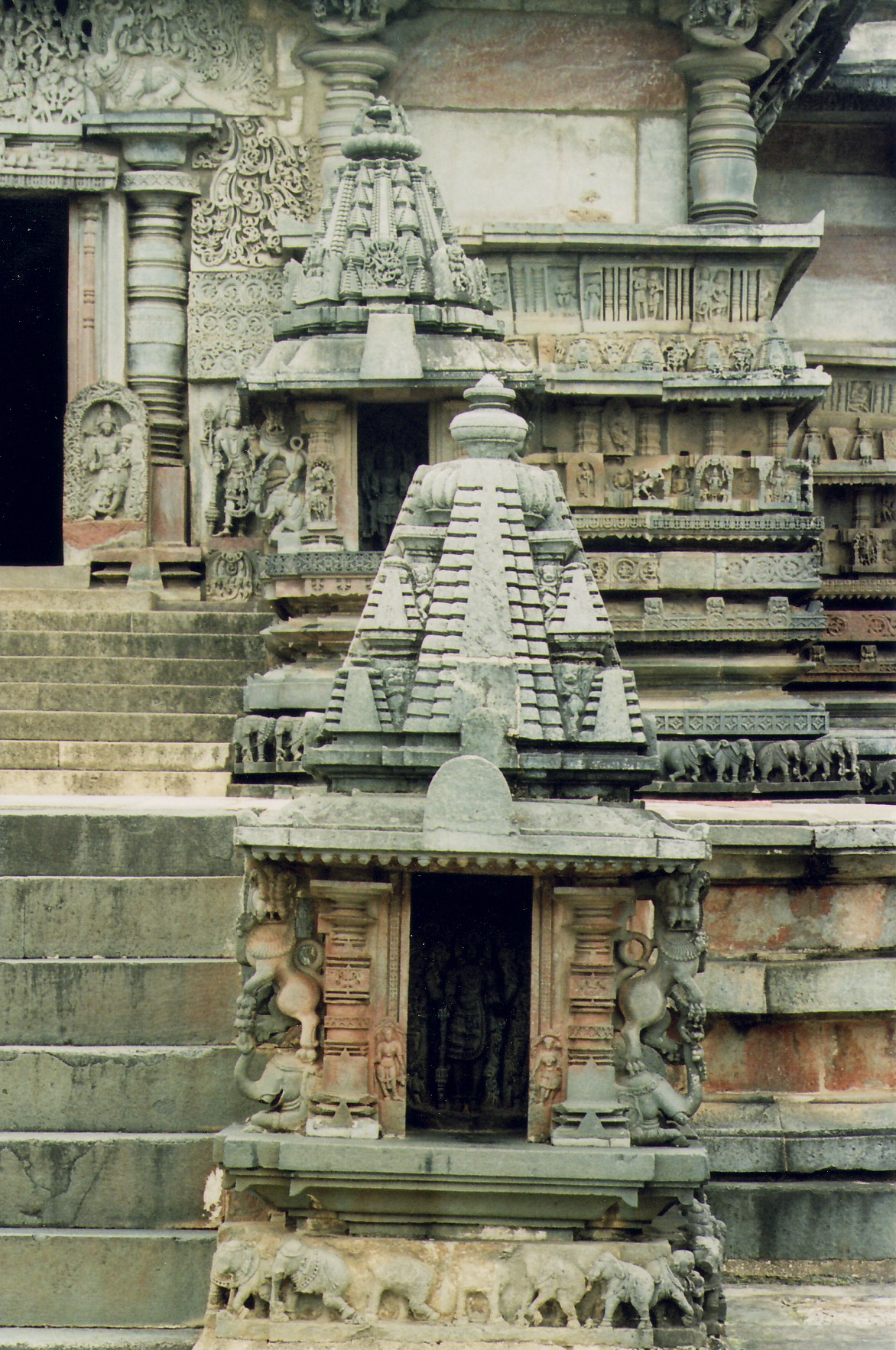
Miniature shrines with Bhumija towers, Belur

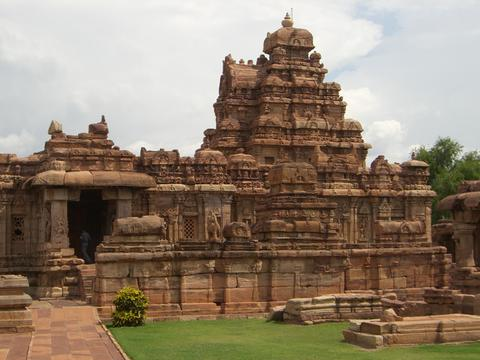
Virupaksha temple, Pattadakallu

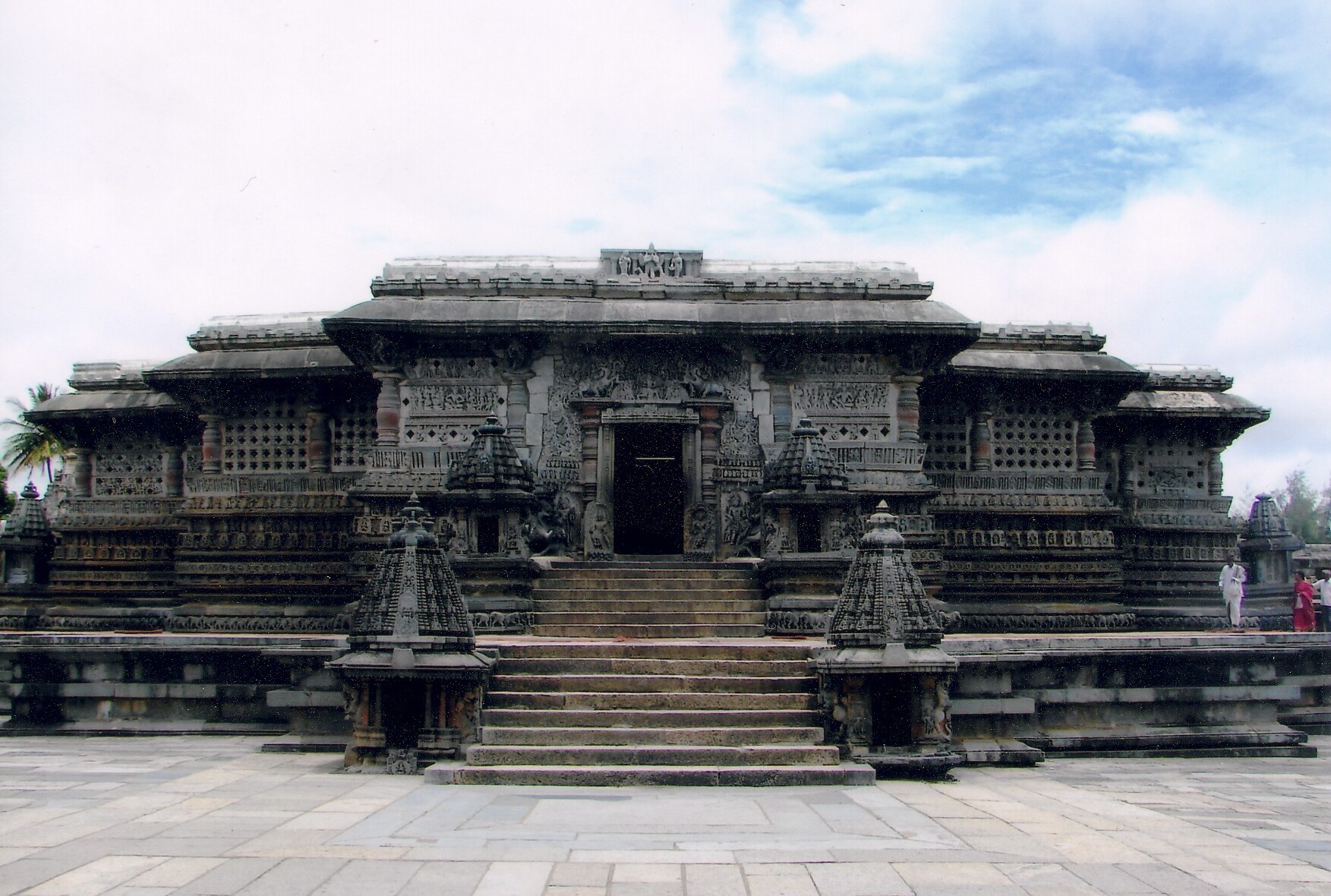
Chennakeshava Temple, Belur

Temples of Karnataka feature many architectural styles:

- Hoysala Architecture
- Badami Chalukya Architecture
- Vijayanagara architecture
- Dravidian Architecture
- Western Chalukya Architecture
- Badami Cave Temples
- Rashtrakuta style
- Ganga Architecture

Most temples have some features in common:

- Nandi (bull) sculpted in black stone at the entrance of a temple is symbolic of the start of the divine place and temple area.
- Pushkarani (a stepped bathing area), with neatly sculpted steps, for temple devotees travelling from far places to take a breather and cleanse. The pushkarani is typically a square-shaped construction which has arrangements to keep the water flowing so it does not stagnate.
- Gopura are ornate monumental towers which mark the entrance to the temple.
- Garbhagudi (garbha meaning womb in Sanskrit/Kannada) is the inner sanctum, which can be of various sizes and shapes according to the architecture. Garbhagudi may be placed on an elevated position on a stone foundation. Artists may find a place to practice and display devotional sangeetha (music) and naatya (dancing).
- Vigraha is an image of the God, typically a black stone lingam, inside the inner sanctum (garbhagudi).

Normally the oldest temples are built on hilltops, where people view God being placed on top of all in the midst of Prakṛti (nature). The steps to reach the top are carefully carved on rocky hills as most of the hard stone mountains rocks contain water. Shiva Gange at Therhalli is one such example.

Other temples situated on hills include Chamundeshwari Hills, Mahadeshwara Hills, Biligiriranga Hills and Kodachadri Hills.

== Temples and Practices ==
Some temples of Dakshina Kannada have the practice of not allowing ordinary clothing to be worn inside. People can drape a cloth over, or wear a Dhoti. This practice is especially found in the temples in Dakshina Kannada, which lies between the Western Ghats and the Arabian Sea. This is a very popular temple as the climate is suitable for visits all year long. Kollur, Kukke, Dharmasthala, Sringeri, Horanadu, Karkala, Murudeshwara and Gokarna are some other famous temples known for devotees thronging to them throughout the year.

Many temples in Udupi represent the Dvaita philosophy and are mostly run by priests of the Ashta Matha monasteries. The Sri Krishna temple, also in Udupi, features the Kanakana kindi or Kanaka's Window, a small peephole in the wall of the temple through which a statue of the great Indian saint Kanaka Dasa may be viewed.

Temples in Sringeri represent the Advaita Vedanta philosophy of Adi Shankara. Being one of the oldest institutions of Sanskrit learning, Sringeri Shaarada Peetha is seen as the abode of Saraswati, the goddess of learning, and holds a very prominent place in the history of learning and in the hearts of Kannadigas.

North Karnataka temples represent the old glory of long ago kingdoms, with some rituals still practised. Many of the magnificently sculpted temples include shaasanas (inscriptions) which depict various important historical periods.

== See also ==
- Karnataka
- North Karnataka
- Tourism in Karnataka
- Tourism in North Karnataka
- Temples of North Karnataka
- Jainism in North Karnataka
- Chettikulangara Devi Temple
