= Anna Vinayachandra =

Indian politician (born 1948)

Member of Karnataka Legislative Council
- In office 6 January 1998 – 5 January 2004
- Constituency: Dakshina Kannada Local authorities

Personal details
- Born: 9 January 1948 (age 78) Badagannur, Puttur, Dakshina Kannada
- Party: Independent
- Spouse: Padma Rao
- Children: 3
- Occupation: Agriculturist

Anna Vinayachandra is an Ex-MLC from Panchayati Raj constituency of Dakshina Kannada, Karnataka. He is a social activist, political activist and thinker. He was associated with Bharatiya Janata Party but came out of party politics and now works independently.

== Political career and reforms ==
Before becoming MLC, Anna Vinayachandra was Karnataka State organizing secretary and State General Secretary for Karnataka BJP twice. Being a huge fan of strengthening panchayti System by decentralization and internal democracy within political party, he started to bring reforms within BJP. He also questioned the communal agenda of BJP which raised eyebrows of conservative BJP leaders, leading to the denial of BJP ticket to contest council polls the next time and was later marginalized from active party involvement.

In 2007-08 Karnataka State election, he floated an organization called Swabhimana Vedike (meaning, platform for self-respect) in Puttur and fielded Shakunthala T Shetty questioning the state BJP's decision to field Mallika Prasad, in spite of local BJP workers vouching for Shakunthala Shetty. Later in 2009, he supported former MLA from Puttur, Rama Bhat when he contested for parliament election against Nalin Kumar Kateel. It is told that these "battles" were to uphold the values of self-respect among grass root workers and not to win the election.

As corruption charges were its peak within State BJP, he floated a state level organization called BJP Elders' Forum (Bha Ja Paa Hiriyara Vedike) with senior leaders like BB Shivappa and Urimajalu Rama Bhat to attempt reform BJP. He toured the state consolidating strengths among party workers to voice against corruption within the party. Particularly, he led BJP workers at national level in demanding expulsion of his former colleague, B. S. Yeddyurappa from the party and was successful.

== Non-political activities ==
Anna Vinayachandra engaged himself in various social struggles. He was involved in fights to strengthen laborers capacity and initiated apolitical fight against social hierarchy by strengthening democracy to get youth towards political fold.

Lately, his main focus is water, health care and education in rural Karnataka. He believes that self-sufficient primary health centres are key to develop both preventive and curative health. So, he worked with the organization called WHEEL. He is currently serving as president of Saraswathi Education trust, an organization which owns industrial training institute for students of low socioeconomic status. He is forefront activist urging central government to take up a massive micro irrigation scheme in Belagavi, Haveri and Hubballi-Dharwad region by supplying Mahadayi river water.

== Personal life ==
Vinayachandra has been an aquarist for more than three decades. He initially began fishkeeping as a hobby, before starting an ornamental fish exporting business.
