= Puttur taluk =

Human settlement in India

Coordinates: 12°47′N 075°22′E

Puttur Taluk is a taluka in Dakshina Kannada district of the Indian state of Karnataka. The headquarters is the town of Puttur. There are thirty-seven Panchayat villages in Puttur Taluka.

== Towns ==
- Ariyadka
- Aryapu
- Badagannuru
- Bajathuru
- Balnadu
- Bannuru
- Belanduru
- Bettampady
- Hirebandady
- Kabaka
- Kaniyuru
- Kedambady
- Kodimbady
- Koila
- Kolthige
- Munduru
- Narimogaru
- Nettanige Mudnuru
- Panaje
- Savanuru
- Uppinangady
- Volamogaru

== Languages (1951) ==
Languages in Puttur Taluk (1951)
1. Tulu (59.5%)
2. Malayalam (15.4%)
3. Kannada (12.2%)
4. Konkani (6.90%)
5. Other (6.00%)
