= Olamogru =

- village
- Country: India
- State: Karnataka
- District: Dakshina Kannada
- Talukas: Puttur

Government
  - Body: Gram panchayat

Population (2011)
  - Total: 5,845

Languages
  - Official: Kannada
- Time zone: UTC+5:30 (IST)
- ISO 3166 code: IN-KA
- Vehicle registration: KA
- Website: karnataka.gov.in

Olamogru is a village in the Puttur Taluk of Dakshina Kannada district, in Karnataka, India.

== Demographics ==
As of 2011 India census, Olamogru had a population of 5845 with 2859 males and 2986 females.

== See also ==
- Dakshina Kannada
- Districts of Karnataka
