= Bendru Theertha =

Hot spring in Karnataka, India

- Location within Karnataka
- Location: Dakshina Kannada, Karnataka, India
- Coordinates: 12.680287°N 75.196624°E
- Elevation: 550 metres (1,800 ft)
- Temperature: 38 °C (100 °F)-57 °C (135 °F)

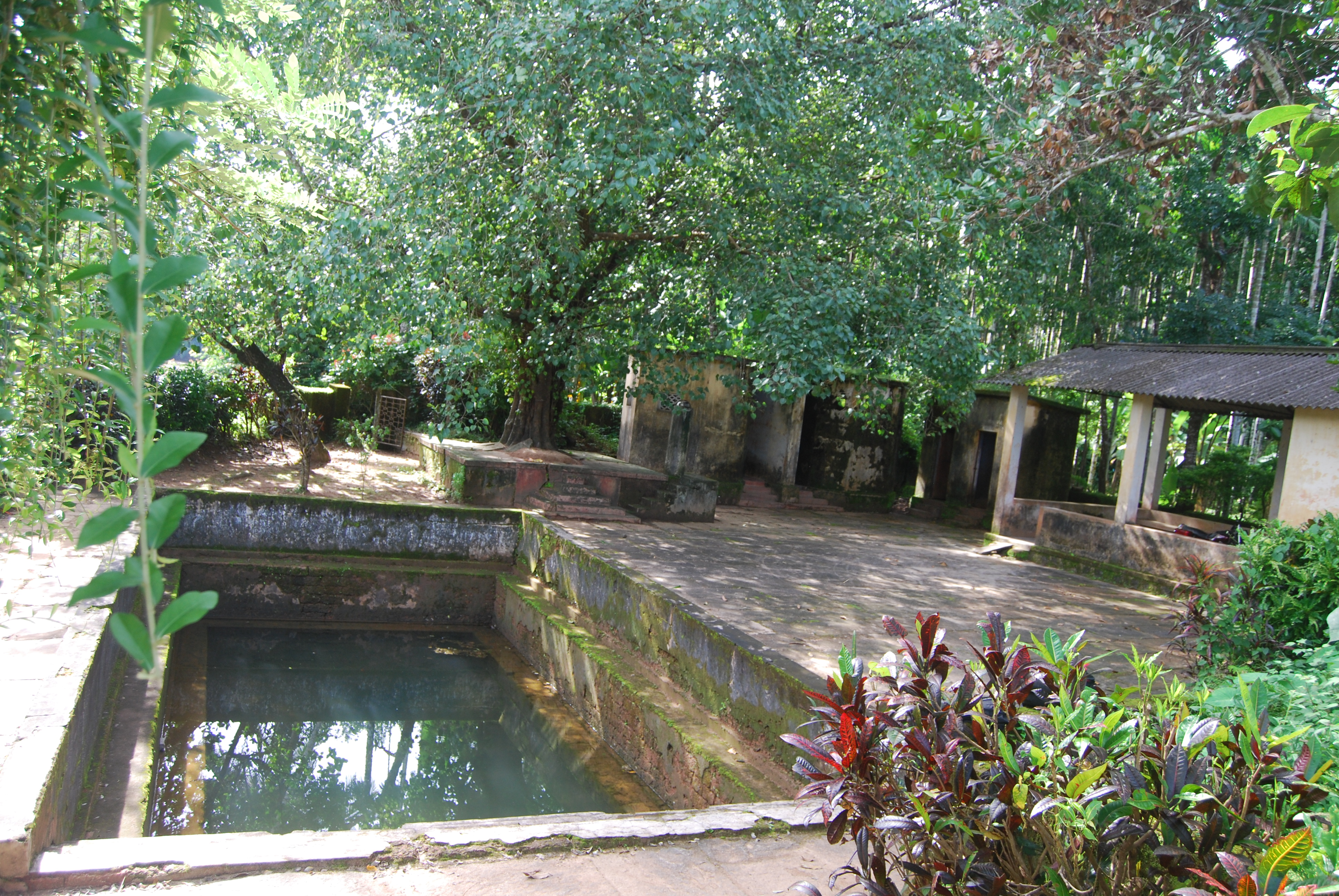
Bendru Theertha

Bendru Theertha (Tulu: ಬೆಂದ್ರ್ ತೀರ್ಥ(boiled water) bendru, bendir, or bend'r ) is a natural hot water spring, located at a distance of about 15 kilometres from Puttur town in the Dakshina Kannada district of Karnataka, India, which is situated in an area near the river Seeresude(Tulu:ಸೀರೆ(Saree) ಸುದೆ(River)), a small tributary of the River Chandragiri. Now it is considered govt of Karnataka as tourist spot of Dakshina Kannada district.

== Religious centre ==
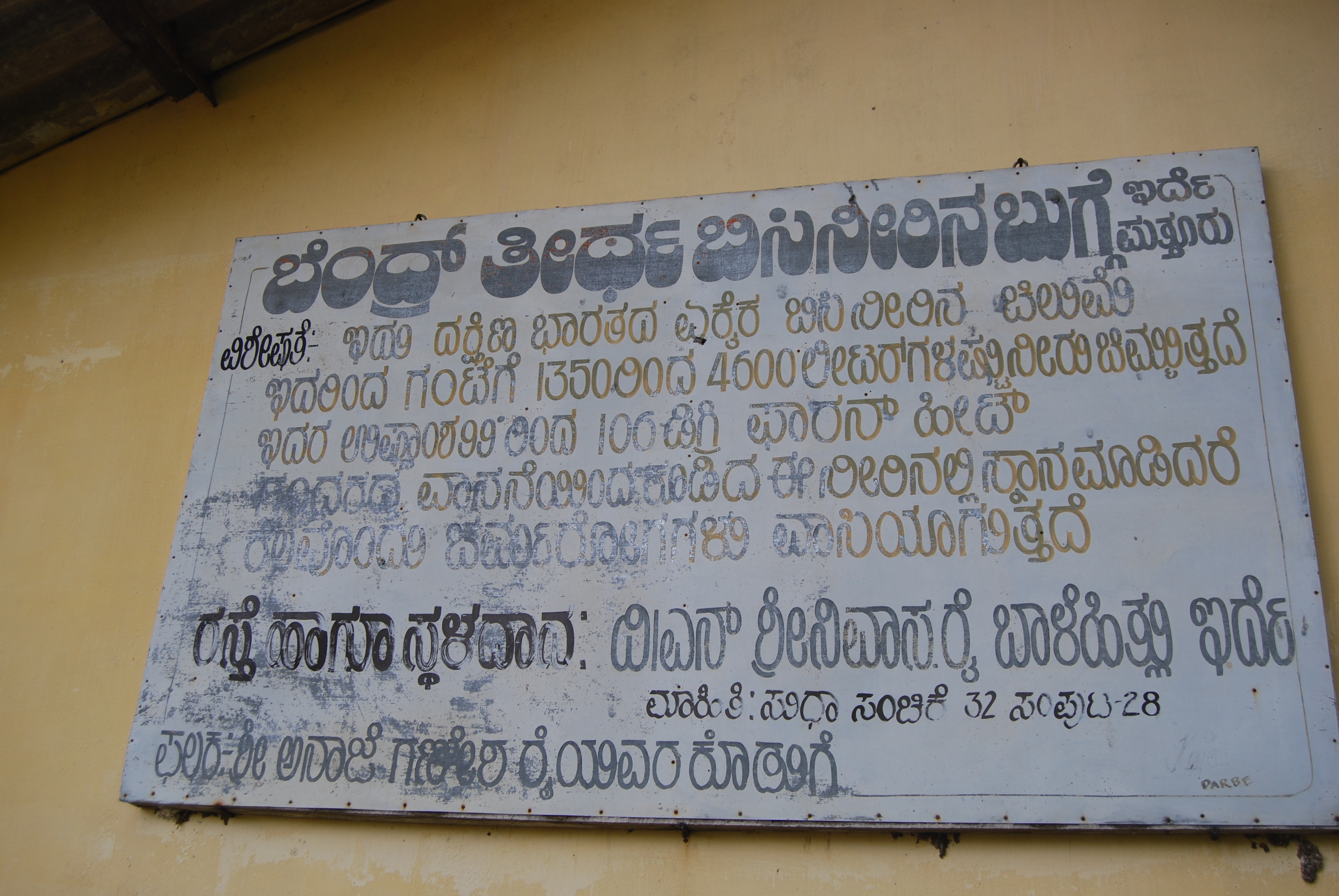
Bendru Theertha Sign Board

Bendru Theertha is a pilgrimage centre for Hindus. Every year on the occasion of Teertha Amavasya day (falls first week of September)people consider this day to be auspicious and come to the hot spring for a holy bathe. They believed that the water is said to be more auspicious and a dip in the pool drives away all skin diseases like eczema, allergic rashes and many more ailments.

== Uniqueness of Bendru Theertha ==
A spring called Bendru Theertha has lukewarm water. Visitors to this spring can cool off in its water without worrying about getting burned. Bendru Theertha's location in a non-volcanic zone makes it special. It is therefore unusual to discover a hot spring there. The water table is thought to be heated by the geothermal energy of the subterranean hot rocks. The heated water emerges as a spring because its density is lower than that of ordinary water.
