= Ashok Kumar Rai =

Ashok Kumar Rai may refer to:

- Ashok Kumar Rai (Indian politician)
- Ashok Rai, Nepali politician
