= Keyyur =

- village
- Country: India
- State: Karnataka
- District: Dakshina Kannada
- Talukas: Puttur

Government
  - Body: Gram panchayat

Population (2001)
  - Total: 5,211

Languages
  - Official: Kannada, Malayalam, Tulu
- Time zone: UTC+5:30 (IST)
- ISO 3166 code: IN-KA
- Vehicle registration: KA
- Website: karnataka.gov.in

Keyyur is a village in the southern state of Karnataka, India. It is located in the Puttur taluk of Dakshina Kannada district. The main occupation among residents is agriculture and the cultivation of areca nut, rubber, cashews, and other crops. The climate remains cool throughout the year.

== Demographics ==
As of 2011 India census, Keyyur had a population of 5211 with 2543 males and 2668 females. Sex ratio was 1049 (females per 1000 male). Literacy rate is 99.57%.

== See also ==
- Dakshina Kannada
- Districts of Karnataka
