= B. A. Saletore =

Indian historian

Bhaskar Anand Saletore
- Born: 1900; Saletore, Puttur taluk, South Canara
- Died: 1963 (aged 62–63)
- Occupations: Historian, academic, professor, Author

Bhaskar Anand Saletore (1900–1963), better known as B. A. Saletore, was an Indian historian from Mangalore, Karnataka.

== Early years ==
B.A. Saletore was born in village named Saletore in the Puttur taluk of South Canara district (present Dakshina Kannada district). He did his early schooling in Mangalore. He did his B.T. degree from Madras and M.A. degree from St. Xavier's College, Mumbai,(then Bombay). He was educated in London University in History 1931 and also from University of Giessen, Germany in Politics 1933.

== Career ==
He started his career as professor of history at Sir Parshurambhau College in Pune in 1938, and later worked at University of Ahmedabad. He worked with the Bombay Educational Service. He became the director of National Archives of India, retiring in 1960. Thereafter, he started his tenure as professor, later head of Post Graduate Department of History, and finally director at Kannada Research institute at Karnataka University, Dharwad.

== Famous works ==
Saletore was a polyglot. His works spanning several books and hundreds of articles cover a wide range of subjects including ancient Indian history. During his early years he was guided by world-famous historians like H. Heras and L.D. Barnett. In the 1930s, he wrote a well-known book Social and Political Life in the Vijayanagara Empire, a book that includes the much debated topic of the origin of the Sangama brothers and the origin of the empire itself. This book was his PhD thesis while at the University of London. The work contains a bibliography of 55 pages, running to thousand and odd books and articles.

Origin of Vijayanagar Empire Saletore was the first among scholars from Karnataka to emphatically prove the Kannada origin of the empire. He resoundingly argued against a Telugu origin propounded by N. Venkataramanayya with literary and numismatic evidence. While the hour of need during the time of the empire was to ward off Muslim invasion into south India and the people and the administrators of the empire were generally bilingual, Saletore beyond doubt proved that the empire had its origins in Kannada country only. Study on political and social history was divided into:

- Revenue administration
- Administration of central government
- Administration of local government
- Law and Justice
- Foreign relations
- Army.

Study on cultural history divided into

- Social institutions
- Position of women
- Social legislation
- Public service
- Habitation, food and dress
- Corporate life
- Festivals, games and amusements.

In appreciation of his work, historian S. Krishnaswamy Aiyangar sums up Saletore's efforts in a nutshell. "The very extent of the subject and the vastness of details available, would baffle in this direction ordinarily. But Dr. Saletore has succeeded in producing a creditable work bearing on the vast subject. The work gives a correct and complete view of the life of the people under the empire, during the three centuries of its fight to preserve Hindu institutions and Hindu civilization".

He is said to be the first historian to use epigraphical sources for the study of social history which is what current days students of history do. He is said to be a pioneer in throwing light on socio-economic polity of Karnataka over the ages. His last book, Ancient Indian Political Thought and Institutions, written just before his death, is said to be a masterpiece. The book is said to be a comparative study of great Indian political minds of ancient times including Kautilya.

== Other works ==
- Ancient Karnataka—History of Tuluva, Poona, 1936
- Medieval Jainism with special reference to the Vijayanagara Empire—Poona, 1938
- Karnataka's Trans-Oceanic Contacts—Dharwar, 1956
- Main Currents in the Ancient History of Gujarat—Baroda, 1960
- India's Diplomatic Relations with the East—Bombay 1960
- The Sthanikas and their Historical Importance B. A. Saletore, Journal Of The University of Bombay, July 1938, Vol VII, Part I (1938), pp29 to pp93
- "Vaishnavism In Vijayanagara, BA Saletore" Published in D. R. Bhandarkar Volume, Indian Research Institute, 1940, p192 to p195
