= Nettanigemudnoor =

Nettanigemudnoor Nettanige Mudnuru
- village
- Country: India
- State: Karnataka
- District: Dakshina Kannada
- Talukas: Puttur

Government
  - Body: Gram panchayat

Population (2001)
  - Total: 8,226

Languages
  - Official: Kannada
- Time zone: UTC+5:30 (IST)
- ISO 3166 code: IN-KA
- Vehicle registration: KA
- Website: karnataka.gov.in

Nettanigemudnoor is a village in the southern state of Karnataka, India. It is located in the Puttur taluk of Dakshina Kannada district.

== Demographics ==
As of 2001 India census, Nettanigemudnoor had a population of 8226 with 4082 males and 4144 females.

== See also ==
- Dakshina Kannada
- Districts of Karnataka
