= Puttur Assembly constituency =

Legislative Assembly constituency in Karnataka, India

Coordinates: 12.77°N 75.20°E

Puttur
- Constituency No. 206 for the Karnataka Legislative Assembly

Constituency details
- Country: India
- Region: South India
- State: Karnataka
- District: Dakshina Kannada
- Lok Sabha constituency: Dakshina Kannada
- Established: 1951
- Reservation: None

Member of Legislative Assembly
- 16th Karnataka Legislative Assembly
- Incumbent Ashok Kumar Rai
- Party: Indian National Congress
- Elected year: 2023
- Preceded by: Sanjeev Matandoor

Puttur Assembly constituency is an assembly constituency of the Karnataka Legislative Assembly. It is one of the 8 constituencies in the Dakshina Kannada.

== Overview ==
The constituency was previously part of Mangalore Lok Sabha constituency, but it is now a part of Dakshina Kannada Lok Sabha constituency.

== Members of the Legislative Assembly ==
| Election | Member | Party |
|---|---|---|
| 1952 | K. Venkatramana Gowda | Indian National Congress |
| 1952 | K. Iswara | Indian National Congress |
| 1952 By-election | R. B. V. Sudarsanavarma | Indian National Congress |
| 1957 | Naik Subbaya | Indian National Congress |
| 1957 | K. Venkatramana Gowda | Indian National Congress |
| 1962 | K. Venkatramana Gowda | Indian National Congress |
| 1967 | B. Vittaldas Shetty | Indian National Congress |
| 1972 | A. Shanker Alva | Indian National Congress |
| 1978 | K. Rama Bhat | Janata Party |
| 1983 | K. Rama Bhat | Bharatiya Janata Party |
| 1985 | Vinay Kumar Sorake | Indian National Congress |
| 1989 | Vinay Kumar Sorake | Indian National Congress |
| 1994 | Sadananda Gowda | Bharatiya Janata Party |
| 1999 | Sadananda Gowda | Bharatiya Janata Party |
| 2004 | Shakunthala T. Shetty | Bharatiya Janata Party |
| 2008 | Mallika Prasad | Bharatiya Janata Party |
| 2013 | Shakunthala T. Shetty | Indian National Congress |
| 2018 | Sanjeeva Matandoor | Bharatiya Janata Party |
| 2023 | Ashok Kumar Rai | Indian National Congress |

== Election results ==
=== Assembly Election 2023 ===
2023 Karnataka Legislative Assembly election : Puttur
| Party | Candidate | Votes | % | ±% |
|---|---|---|---|---|
| INC | Ashok Kumar Rai | 66,607 | 38.55% | ▼3.91 |
| Independent | Arun Kumar Puthila | 62,458 | 36.15% | New |
| BJP | Asha Thimmappa | 37,558 | 21.74% | ▼32.43 |
| SDPI | Shaffi Bellare | 2,788 | 1.61% | New |
| NOTA | None of the above | 866 | 0.50% | ▼0.24 |
| Margin of victory | | 4,149 | 2.40% | ▼9.31 |
| Turnout | | 173,285 | 81.41% | ▼1.06 |
| Total valid votes | | 172,762 | | |
| Registered electors | | 212,848 | | ▲5.40 |
| INC gain from BJP | | Swing | ▼15.62 | |

=== Assembly Election 2018 ===
2018 Karnataka Legislative Assembly election : Puttur
| Party | Candidate | Votes | % | ±% |
|---|---|---|---|---|
| BJP | Sanjeeva Matandoor | 90,073 | 54.17% | ▲11.69 |
| INC | Shakunthala T. Shetty | 70,596 | 42.46% | ▼2.96 |
| JD(S) | I. C. Kailas Gowda | 1,424 | 0.86% | ▼3.68 |
| NOTA | None of the above | 1,227 | 0.74% | New |
| Margin of victory | | 19,477 | 11.71% | ▲8.77 |
| Turnout | | 166,545 | 82.47% | ▲2.93 |
| Total valid votes | | 166,271 | | |
| Registered electors | | 201,948 | | ▲12.44 |
| BJP gain from INC | | Swing | ▲8.75 | |

=== Assembly Election 2013 ===
2013 Karnataka Legislative Assembly election : Puttur
| Party | Candidate | Votes | % | ±% |
|---|---|---|---|---|
| INC | Shakunthala T. Shetty | 66,345 | 45.42% | ▲8.81 |
| BJP | Sanjeeva Matandoor | 62,056 | 42.48% | ▲4.71 |
| JD(S) | Dinesh. B. N | 6,625 | 4.54% | New |
| SDPI | Abubakkar Siddik | 4,442 | 3.04% | New |
| Independent | Shekar Madavu | 1,834 | 1.26% | New |
| KJP | Jayaram Bhat A. Madavu | 1,506 | 1.03% | New |
| Margin of victory | | 4,289 | 2.94% | ▲1.79 |
| Turnout | | 142,861 | 79.54% | ▲2.94 |
| Total valid votes | | 146,066 | | |
| Registered electors | | 179,600 | | ▲11.43 |
| INC gain from BJP | | Swing | ▲7.65 | |

=== Assembly Election 2008 ===
2008 Karnataka Legislative Assembly election : Puttur
| Party | Candidate | Votes | % | ±% |
|---|---|---|---|---|
| BJP | Mallika Prasad | 46,605 | 37.77% | ▼13.08 |
| INC | Bondala Jagannatha Shetty | 45,180 | 36.61% | ▼5.57 |
| Independent | Akka Shakunthala Shetty | 25,171 | 20.40% | New |
| Independent | Nalini Lokappa Gowda | 2,721 | 2.20% | New |
| BSP | Abdul Hameed | 2,553 | 2.07% | New |
| SP | Prasad. H. M | 1,173 | 0.95% | New |
| Margin of victory | | 1,425 | 1.15% | ▼7.53 |
| Turnout | | 123,474 | 76.60% | ▼2.05 |
| Total valid votes | | 123,403 | | |
| Registered electors | | 161,183 | | ▼1.15 |
| BJP hold | | Swing | ▼13.08 | |

=== Assembly Election 2004 ===
2004 Karnataka Legislative Assembly election : Puttur
| Party | Candidate | Votes | % | ±% |
|---|---|---|---|---|
| BJP | Shakunthala T. Shetty | 65,119 | 50.85% | ▼2.09 |
| INC | N. Sudhakar Shetty | 54,007 | 42.18% | ▼4.56 |
| JD(S) | Lakshmana Gowda. K. R | 6,355 | 4.96% | New |
| Kannada Nadu Party | Kamalakshi Mohan | 2,571 | 2.01% | New |
| Margin of victory | | 11,112 | 8.68% | ▲2.48 |
| Turnout | | 128,243 | 78.65% | ▼1.93 |
| Total valid votes | | 128,052 | | |
| Registered electors | | 163,050 | | ▲10.29 |
| BJP hold | | Swing | ▼2.09 | |

=== Assembly Election 1999 ===
1999 Karnataka Legislative Assembly election : Puttur
| Party | Candidate | Votes | % | ±% |
|---|---|---|---|---|
| BJP | Sadananda Gowda | 62,306 | 52.94% | ▲4.35 |
| INC | N. Sudhakar Shetty | 55,013 | 46.74% | ▼1.48 |
| Margin of victory | | 7,293 | 6.20% | ▲5.83 |
| Turnout | | 119,115 | 80.58% | ▲1.31 |
| Total valid votes | | 117,688 | | |
| Rejected ballots | | 1,427 | 1.20% | ▲0.05 |
| Registered electors | | 147,831 | | ▲6.12 |
| BJP hold | | Swing | ▲4.35 | |

=== Assembly Election 1994 ===
1994 Karnataka Legislative Assembly election : Puttur
| Party | Candidate | Votes | % | ±% |
|---|---|---|---|---|
| BJP | Sadananda Gowda | 53,015 | 48.59% | ▲3.68 |
| INC | Vinay Kumar Sorake | 52,611 | 48.22% | ▲1.64 |
| INC | A. Hemanath Shetty | 1,782 | 1.63% | New |
| JD | Parpakaje Ishwar Bhat | 1,411 | 1.29% | ▼6.23 |
| Margin of victory | | 404 | 0.37% | ▼1.29 |
| Turnout | | 110,417 | 79.27% | ▲2.19 |
| Total valid votes | | 109,108 | | |
| Rejected ballots | | 1,270 | 1.15% | ▼2.14 |
| Registered electors | | 139,300 | | ▲10.70 |
| BJP gain from INC | | Swing | ▲2.01 | |

=== Assembly Election 1989 ===
1989 Karnataka Legislative Assembly election : Puttur
| Party | Candidate | Votes | % | ±% |
|---|---|---|---|---|
| INC | Vinay Kumar Sorake | 43,695 | 46.58% | ▼4.88 |
| BJP | Sadananda Gowda | 42,134 | 44.91% | ▲22.08 |
| JD | Parpakaje Ishwar Bhat | 7,054 | 7.52% | New |
| JP | M. Karunakar Rai | 926 | 0.99% | New |
| Margin of victory | | 1,561 | 1.66% | ▼26.97 |
| Turnout | | 96,996 | 77.08% | ▲2.93 |
| Total valid votes | | 93,809 | | |
| Rejected ballots | | 3,187 | 3.29% | ▲2.57 |
| Registered electors | | 125,839 | | ▲27.36 |
| INC hold | | Swing | ▼4.88 | |

=== Assembly Election 1985 ===
1985 Karnataka Legislative Assembly election : Puttur
| Party | Candidate | Votes | % | ±% |
|---|---|---|---|---|
| INC | Vinay Kumar Sorake | 37,426 | 51.46% | ▲8.28 |
| BJP | K. Rama Bhat Urimajade | 16,603 | 22.83% | ▼22.80 |
| JP | U. P. Shivarama | 16,370 | 22.51% | ▲13.19 |
| Independent | Mohammad Delux | 1,572 | 2.16% | New |
| Margin of victory | | 20,823 | 28.63% | ▲26.18 |
| Turnout | | 73,265 | 74.15% | ▲2.21 |
| Total valid votes | | 72,735 | | |
| Rejected ballots | | 530 | 0.72% | ▼0.80 |
| Registered electors | | 98,802 | | ▲20.00 |
| INC gain from BJP | | Swing | ▲5.83 | |

=== Assembly Election 1983 ===
1983 Karnataka Legislative Assembly election : Puttur
| Party | Candidate | Votes | % | ±% |
|---|---|---|---|---|
| BJP | K. Rama Bhat | 26,618 | 45.63% | New |
| INC | B. Sankappa Rai | 25,189 | 43.18% | New |
| JP | C. C. Chacko | 5,436 | 9.32% | ▼34.00 |
| Independent | M. Dayananda Prabhu | 1,090 | 1.87% | New |
| Margin of victory | | 1,429 | 2.45% | ▲1.37 |
| Turnout | | 59,233 | 71.94% | ▼6.88 |
| Total valid votes | | 58,333 | | |
| Rejected ballots | | 900 | 1.52% | ▲0.18 |
| Registered electors | | 82,337 | | ▲7.71 |
| BJP gain from JP | | Swing | ▲2.31 | |

=== Assembly Election 1978 ===
1978 Karnataka Legislative Assembly election : Puttur
| Party | Candidate | Votes | % | ±% |
|---|---|---|---|---|
| JP | K. Rama Bhat | 25,751 | 43.32% | New |
| INC(I) | Betta. P. Ishwara Bhat | 25,109 | 42.24% | New |
| Independent | B. Hukrappa | 8,585 | 14.44% | New |
| Margin of victory | | 642 | 1.08% | ▼25.46 |
| Turnout | | 60,255 | 78.82% | ▲9.83 |
| Total valid votes | | 59,445 | | |
| Rejected ballots | | 810 | 1.34% | ▲1.34 |
| Registered electors | | 76,445 | | ▼1.67 |
| JP gain from INC | | Swing | ▼13.10 | |

=== Assembly Election 1972 ===
1972 Mysore State Legislative Assembly election : Puttur
| Party | Candidate | Votes | % | ±% |
|---|---|---|---|---|
| INC | A. Shanker Alva | 29,630 | 56.42% | ▲8.08 |
| ABJS | K. Rama Bhat | 15,695 | 29.89% | ▼1.77 |
| INC(O) | Parameshwara | 4,353 | 8.29% | New |
| Independent | Padmanabha Pai | 2,566 | 4.89% | New |
| Margin of victory | | 13,935 | 26.54% | ▲9.86 |
| Turnout | | 53,635 | 68.99% | ▼1.76 |
| Total valid votes | | 52,513 | | |
| Registered electors | | 77,745 | | ▲16.31 |
| INC hold | | Swing | ▲8.08 | |

=== Assembly Election 1967 ===
1967 Mysore State Legislative Assembly election : Puttur
| Party | Candidate | Votes | % | ±% |
|---|---|---|---|---|
| INC | B. Vittaldas Shetty | 21,534 | 48.34% | ▼0.11 |
| ABJS | R. Bhat | 14,102 | 31.66% | New |
| Independent | K. D. Shetty | 6,463 | 14.51% | New |
| SWA | P. Nemiraj | 2,446 | 5.49% | ▼22.25 |
| Margin of victory | | 7,432 | 16.68% | ▼4.03 |
| Turnout | | 47,292 | 70.75% | ▲15.23 |
| Total valid votes | | 44,545 | | |
| Registered electors | | 66,844 | | ▲19.94 |
| INC hold | | Swing | ▼0.11 | |

=== Assembly Election 1962 ===
1962 Mysore State Legislative Assembly election : Puttur
| Party | Candidate | Votes | % | ±% |
|---|---|---|---|---|
| INC | K. Venkatramana Gowda | 14,259 | 48.45% | ▼16.66 |
| SWA | K. Uggappa Shetty | 8,163 | 27.74% | New |
| ABJS | K. Rama Bhat | 4,383 | 14.89% | New |
| CPI | Sanjiva Rai | 2,624 | 8.92% | ▼0.97 |
| Margin of victory | | 6,096 | 20.71% | ▲0.57 |
| Turnout | | 30,942 | 55.52% | ▲11.09 |
| Total valid votes | | 29,429 | | |
| Registered electors | | 55,730 | | ▼44.85 |
| INC hold | | Swing | ▲15.30 | |

=== Assembly Election 1957 ===
1957 Mysore State Legislative Assembly election : Puttur
| Party | Candidate | Votes | % | ±% |
|---|---|---|---|---|
| INC | Naik Subbaya | 29,763 | 33.15% | ▼38.61 |
| INC | K. Venkatramana Gowda | 28,691 | 31.96% | ▼39.80 |
| ABJS | K. Rama Bhat | 11,684 | 13.01% | New |
| ABJS | Naik Aithappa | 10,759 | 11.98% | New |
| CPI | Rai Sanjeeva. K | 8,881 | 9.89% | New |
| Margin of victory | | 18,079 | 20.14% | ▼23.37 |
| Turnout | | 89,778 | 44.43% | |
| Total valid votes | | 89,778 | | |
| Registered electors | | 101,044 | | |
| INC hold | | Swing | ▼38.61 | |

=== Assembly By-election 1952 ===
1952 Madras State Legislative Assembly by-election : Puttur
| Party | Candidate | Votes | % | ±% |
|---|---|---|---|---|
| INC | R. B. V. Sudarsanavarma | 25,959 | 71.76% | ▼102.38 |
| KLP | G. Siviah | 10,218 | 28.24% | New |
| Margin of victory | | 15,741 | 43.51% | ▲13.23 |
| Total valid votes | | 36,177 | | |
| INC hold | | Swing | ▼15.76 | |

=== Assembly Election 1952 ===
1952 Madras State Legislative Assembly election : Puttur
| Party | Candidate | Votes | % | ±% |
|---|---|---|---|---|
| INC | K. Venkatramana Gowda | 42,735 | 87.52% | New |
| INC | K. Iswara | 42,299 | 86.62% | New |
| KMPP | K. Karanth | 27,947 | 57.23% | New |
| KMPP | M. Naiker Ramanna | 22,339 | 45.75% | New |
| Socialist Party (India) | Beran | 6,763 | 13.85% | New |
| SCF | S. G. Salenna | 2,811 | 5.76% | New |
| Margin of victory | | 14,788 | 30.28% | |
| Turnout | | 48,831 | 59.77% | |
| Total valid votes | | 48,831 | | |
| Registered electors | | 83,392 | | |
| INC win (new seat) | | | | |

== See also ==
- List of constituencies of Karnataka Legislative Assembly
