= 102 Nekkilady =

- village
- Location in Karnataka, India 102 Nekkilady (India)
- Coordinates: 12.726670°N 75.503288°E
- Country: India
- State: Karnataka
- District: Dakshina Kannada
- Talukas: Puttur

Government
  - Body: Village Panchayat

Population (2011)
  - Total: 1,804

Languages
  - Official: Kannada,Tulu
- Time zone: UTC+5:30 (IST)
- ISO 3166 code: IN-KA
- Vehicle registration: KA
- Nearest city: Dakshina Kannada
- Civic agency: Village Panchayat
- Website: karnataka.gov.in

102 Nekkilady is a village in the Puttur Taluk of Dakshina Kannada district, in Karnataka, India.

== See also ==
- Dakshina Kannada
- Districts of Karnataka
