= Antara Gange =

Mountain in Kolar district, Karnataka, India

Coordinates: 13°8′32.73″N 78°6′2.02″E

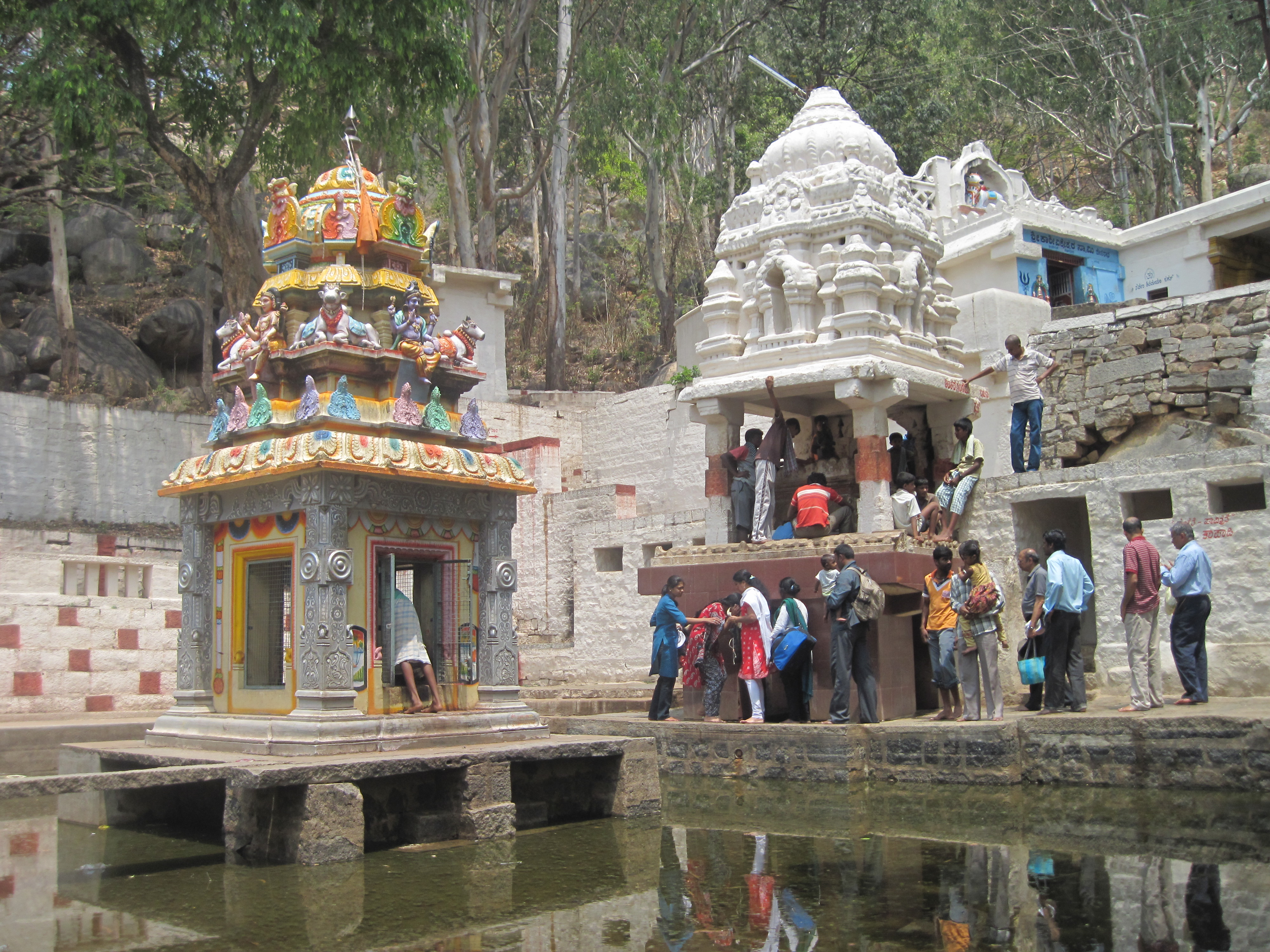
Antara Gange temple

Antara Gange (also known as Anthargange) is a mountain situated in the Shathashrunga mountain range in the southeastern portion of the Indian state of Karnataka, Kolar district. Antara Gange literally means "Ganges from deep" in Kannada. It is about two miles from the town of Kolar and seventy kilometers from Bangalore. Antara Gange is famous for Sri Kashi Vishweshwara temple, also known as Kashi of South. The temple is dedicated to Lord Shiva. In the temple is a pond which gets a continuous flow of underground water from the mouth of a Basava (stone bull). It is believed that drinking water from the pond cleanse one from many diseases.

Way to Antar Gange caves is a steep and narrow path behind the temple to top of the mountain. (Now, the entry to the caves is restricted) The caves are 3-4 km from the temple. There are seven villages on this mountain, including Therhalli. The mountain consists of granite rocks and lot of caves around. Trekking in and around caves is popular here. Tourists also do night trekking and camping here, especially in summer months.
