= Kolthige =

Kolthige Koltige Perlampady
- village
- Location in Karnataka, India
- Coordinates: 12.77°N 75.22°E
- Country: India
- State: Karnataka
- District: Dakshina Kannada
- Talukas: Puttur

Government
  - Body: Gram Panchayat Kolthige

Population (2001)
  - Total: 6,123

Languages
  - Official: Kannada
- Time zone: UTC+5:30 (IST)
- PIN: 574212
- Telephone code: 91-8251-273xxx
- ISO 3166 code: IN-KA
- Vehicle registration: KA21 ** ****
- Nearest cities: Mangalore, Puttur
- Lok Sabha constituency: Mangalore
- Vidhan Sabha constituency: Puttur
- Civic agency: Gram Panchayat Kolthige
- Website: karnataka.gov.in

Kolthige or Koltige is a village in the southern state of Karnataka, India. It is located in the Puttur taluk of Dakshina Kannada district in Karnataka.

== Demographics ==
As of 2001 India census, Kolthige had a population of 6123 with 3039 males and 3084 females.

== See also ==
- Dakshina Kannada
- Districts of Karnataka
