= South Canara District Central Co-operative Bank =

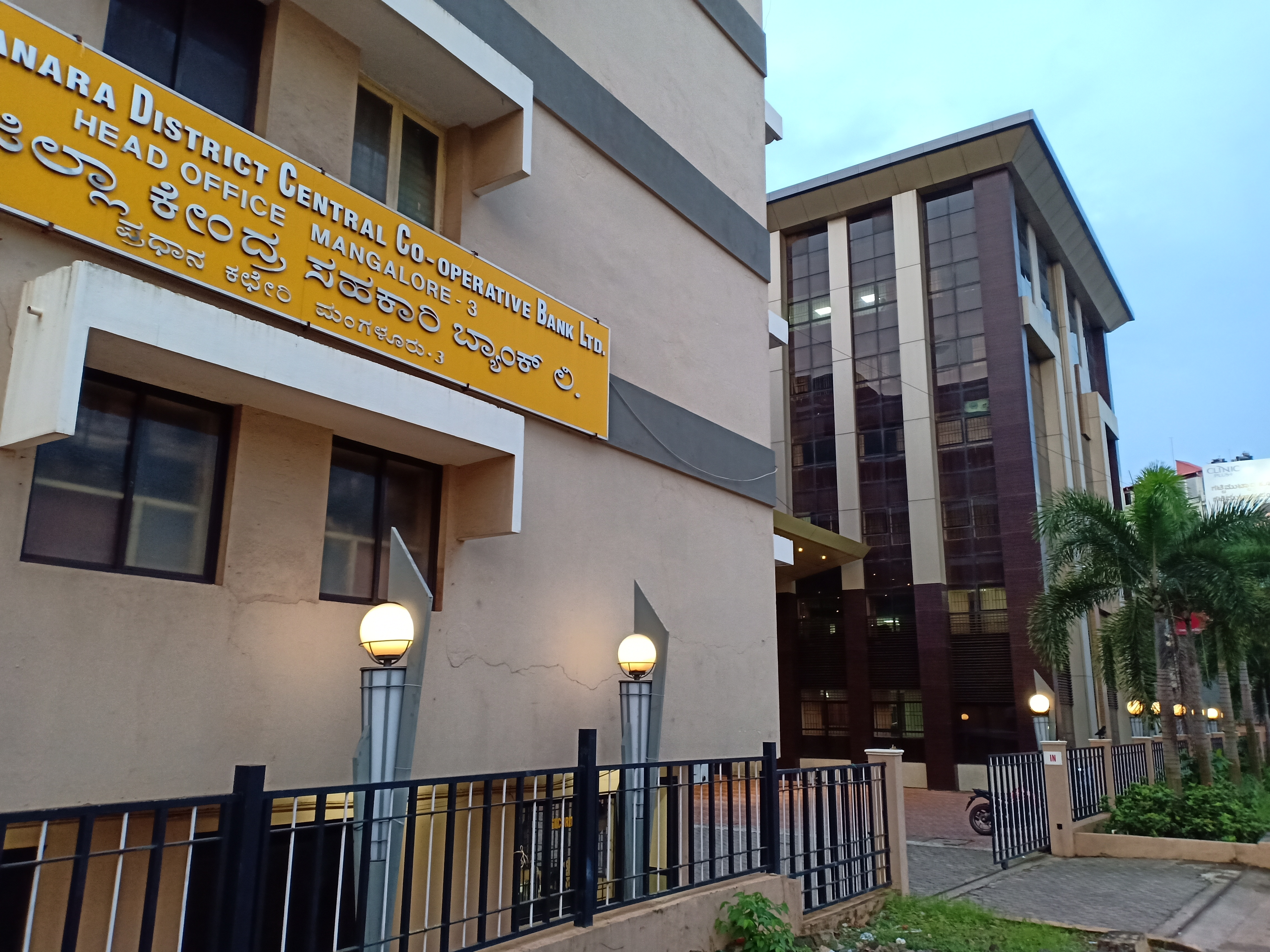
- Head office at K S Rao Road in Mangalore
- Company type: Co-operative Bank
- Industry: Financial services
- Founded: 1912
- Founder: Molahalli Shivarao
- Headquarters: Puttur, Karnataka, India
- Products: Commercial banking Retail banking Private banking
- Website: scdccbank.com

South Canara District Central Co-operative Bank (SCDCC Bank) is a district central cooperative bank in Dakshina Kannada and Udupi district of Karnataka, India. It was established in 1912 at Puttur, Karnataka, by Molahalli Shiva Rao. as the 7th central cooperative bank in the erstwhile Madras presidency at Puttur. The bank's head office is located in Mangalore.

It has a network of 113 branches, including service branches, spread across the undivided district of South Canara. The bank offers a wide range of banking products and services to its customers, including savings accounts, current accounts, fixed deposits, loans, and insurance produmagazine.
