= Shathashrunga =

Mountain range in Kolar, Karnataka, India

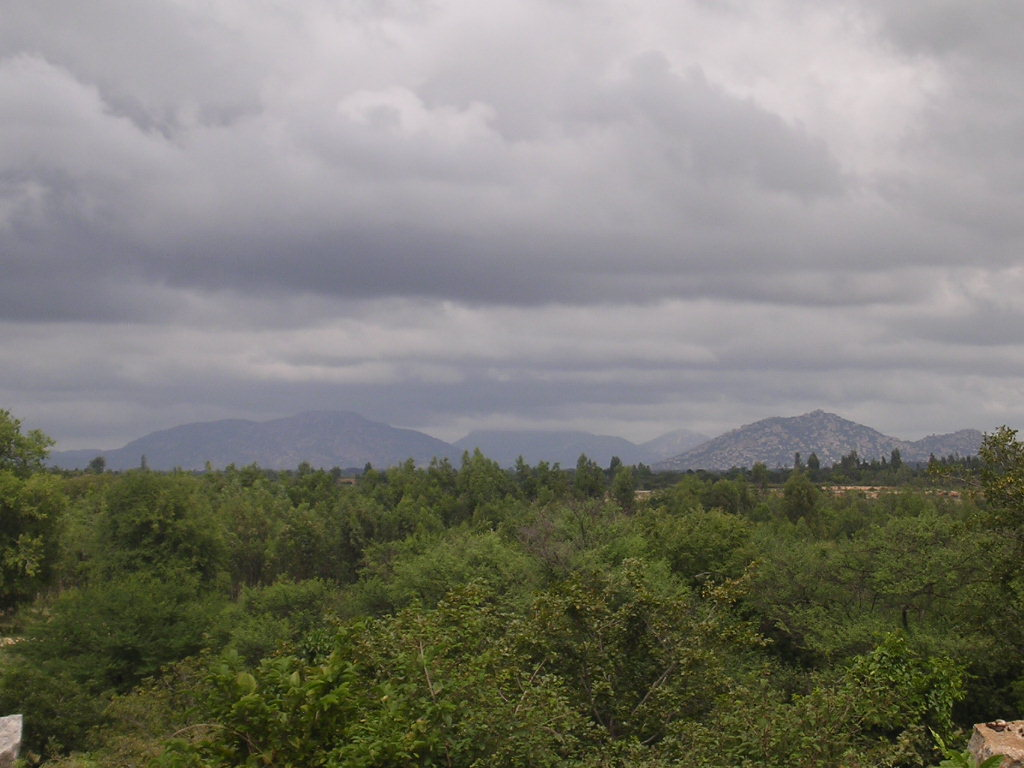
Shathashrunga Mountain Range

Shathashrunga is a mountain range in the Kolar district, Karnataka state (southeastern portion) India that meets the Eastern Ghats. The Antara Gange comes within this range of mountains.
