= Aryapu (Rural) =

- village
- Location in Karnataka, India Aryapu (Rural) (India)
- Coordinates: 12.77°N 75.22°E
- Country: India
- State: Karnataka
- District: Dakshina Kannada
- Talukas: Puttur

Government
  - Body: Gram panchayat

Population (2001)
  - Total: 5,547

Languages
  - Official: Kannada
- Time zone: UTC+5:30 (IST)
- ISO 3166 code: IN-KA
- Vehicle registration: KA
- Website: karnataka.gov.in

Aryapu (Rural) is a village in the southern state of Karnataka, India. It is located in the Puttur taluk of Dakshina Kannada district in Karnataka.

== Demographics ==
As of 2001 India census, Aryapu (Rural) had a population of 5547 with 2813 males and 2734 females.

== See also ==
- Dakshina Kannada
- Districts of Karnataka
