= B. Vittaldas Shetty =

Indian politician

Member of the Karnataka Legislative Assembly
- Incumbent
- Assumed office 1967
- Constituency: Puttur

Minister of State for Food and Civil Supplies

Personal details
- Occupation: Politician

B. Vittaldas Shetty is an Indian politician who has been a minister in the Government of Karnataka.

Shetty was elected to the Karnataka Legislative Assembly in 1967 from the Puttur constituency. He also served as Minister of State for Food and Civil Supplies in Veerendra Patil's Cabinet.
