= Hirebandadi =

- village
- Country: India
- State: Karnataka
- District: Dakshina Kannada
- Talukas: Puttur

Government
  - Body: Gram panchayat

Population (2001)
  - Total: 5,165

Languages
  - Official: Kannada
- Time zone: UTC+5:30 (IST)
- ISO 3166 code: IN-KA
- Vehicle registration: KA
- Nearest city: Mangalore
- Website: karnataka.gov.in

Hirebandadi is a village in the southern state of Karnataka, India. It is located in the Puttur taluk of Dakshina Kannada district. It mostly consists of paddy fields and areca nut plantations. It has numerous streams cutting across the region and lies along the banks of the Netravati River.

Tulu is the primary language spoken here.

== History ==
Its history includes large zamindar settlements from the Jain and Bunt communities. The Adekala house is one such family house that is still present in the locality and continues to follow ancient traditions with Dr Sumanth Shetty as the current yejamana of the house.

There were massive floods in the area during the 1920s.

There are tales of tiger sightings and places like Pilli Kallu which translates to tiger stone as it is believed that tigers used to rest on these boulders.

== Demographics ==
As of 2001 India census, Hirebandadi had a population of 5165 with 2537 males and 2628 females.

== See also ==
- Dakshina Kannada
- Districts of Karnataka
