= Bajathuru =

- village
- Country: India
- State: Karnataka
- District: Dakshina Kannada
- Talukas: Puttur

Government
  - Body: Gram panchayat

Population (2011)
  - Total: 5,913

Languages
  - Official: Kannada Tulu
- Time zone: UTC+5:30 (IST)
- ISO 3166 code: IN-KA
- Vehicle registration: KA
- Website: karnataka.gov.in

Bajathuru is a village in the southern state of Karnataka, India. It is located in the Puttur taluk of Dakshina Kannada district in Karnataka.

== Demographics ==
As of 2011 India census, Bajathuru had a population of 5913 with 2952 males and 2961 females.

== See also ==
- Dakshina Kannada
- Districts of Karnataka
- Mangalore
- Uppinangadi
