= Gude Mahalingeswara Temple =

Hindu temple in Karnataka, India

Coordinates: 13.8014°N 74.6731°E

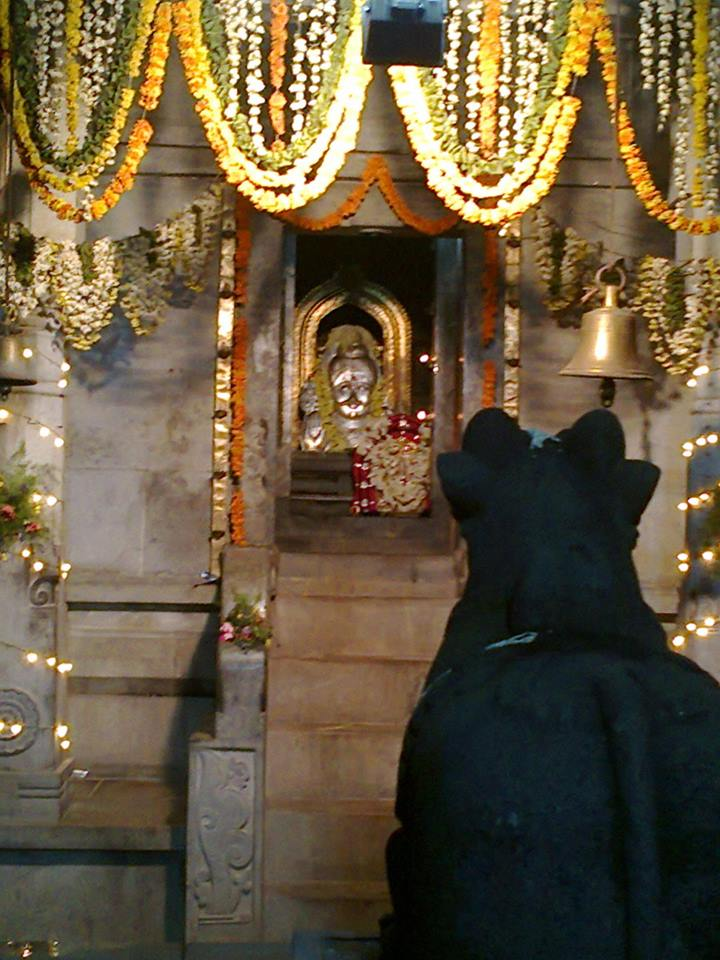
Gude Mahalingeshwara Devaru

Sri Gude Mahalingeshwara Temple (ಗುಡೇ ಮಹಾಲೀ೦ಗೆಶ್ವರ ದೇವಸ್ಥಾನ) is an Indian temple, located in Herenjalu Kundapura taluk, Udupi district in Karnataka, India Pin code 576219. It is a God Shiva temple and has years of old history. Shiva is worshiped as Gude Mahalingeswara (ಮಹಾಲೀ೦ಗೆಶ್ವರ), and is represented by the lingam. The temple has the Garbhagriha (sanctum), the Darshan Mandap (worship hall), and Sabha Mandap (convention hall), Vinayaka and Mata devi temple.

The Gude Mahalineshrawara festival is celebrated during the month of April (Chitra Poornime) of every year, the festival lasts for 3 days. The major religious activities (or pujas) performed every morning are abhisheka, aarti etc. In the season of Danurmasa (one month before Makara Sankranti) conducting morning pujas.
