= Seebi =

Village in Karnataka, India

Seebi is a village in Sira Taluk in Tumkur district. It is 24 km from Tumkur and 24 km from Sira.

Seebi formerly known as Sibur and Harihararayapura, an agrahara village.

It has a big stone temple of Narasimhaswamy. The image of Narasimha in the temple is in the form of a saligrama. The ten avataras of Vishnu, the leelas (sports) of Shiva and the scenes from the Ramayana and Mahabharata are painted on the beams and ceilings of the temple. These paintings appear to be of the latter part of the 18th century A.D. caused to be drawn by one Nallappa, an officer under Tipu. They are contemporaneous to the paintings at Srirangapattana.
