= Shakunthala T. Shetty =

Indian politician

Member of the Karnataka Legislative Assembly for Puttur
- In office 2004–2008
- Preceded by: D. V. Sadananda Gowda
- Succeeded by: Mallika Prasad
- In office 8 May 2013 – May 2018
- Preceded by: Mallika Prasad
- Succeeded by: Sanjeeva Matandoor

Personal details
- Born: 1 March 1947 (age 79) Perla, Kasaragod, British India (present-day Kasaragod district, Kerala, India)
- Party: Indian National Congress (2013-Present)
- Other political affiliations: Bharatiya Janata Party (Till 2013)
- Spouse: A. Thimmappa Shetty
- Children: 3

Shakunthala Thimmappa Shetty (born 1 March 1947) is an Indian politician and a former member of the legislative assembly of Karnataka. Representing Puttur at the assembly, she was elected as a member from the Bharatiya Janata Party first and the Indian National Congress in her second term. She retired from electoral politics following her defeat at the 2018 election.

== Career ==
Shetty joined the Indian National Congress after she was expelled from the Bharatiya Janata Party in May 2008.

=== Film ===
Shakunthala Shetty played the lead role in a Tulu film Kanchilda Baale.
