= Mallika Prasad =

Indian politician

MLA
- In office 4 June 2008 – 5 May 2013
- Preceded by: Shakunthala T. Shetty
- Succeeded by: Shakunthala T. Shetty
- Constituency: Puttur

Personal details
- Party: Bharatiya Janata Party
- Occupation: Politician

Mallika Prasad (née Bhandary) is a former Indian politician from Bharatiya Janata Party and she was MLA representing the Puttur constituency.

In 2008 Karnataka assembly elections, she contested against Congress leader Bondala Jagannath Shetty and Shakunthala T. Shetty of Swabhiman Vedike, and won by a margin of 1425 votes.
