= Therhalli =

- village
- Location of Antaragange in Karnataka, India Therhalli (India)
- Coordinates: 13.143678°N 78.100734°E
- Country: India
- State: Karnataka
- District: Kolar

Languages
  - Official: Kannada
- Time zone: UTC+5:30 (IST)
- Nearest city: Kolar
- Lok Sabha constituency: Kolar

Thera Halli is a village in Karnataka, India. It is situated on top of the Antara Gange hill near Kolar. There is an ancient temple dedicated to Shiva situated in the Mountain. "Thera Halli" literally means "village that is suspended" in Kannada.
