= Narasimha Swamy Temple, Seebi =

Seebi Narasimha Swamy Temple Seebi narasimha
- Hindu temple
- Seebi Narasimha Swamy Temple
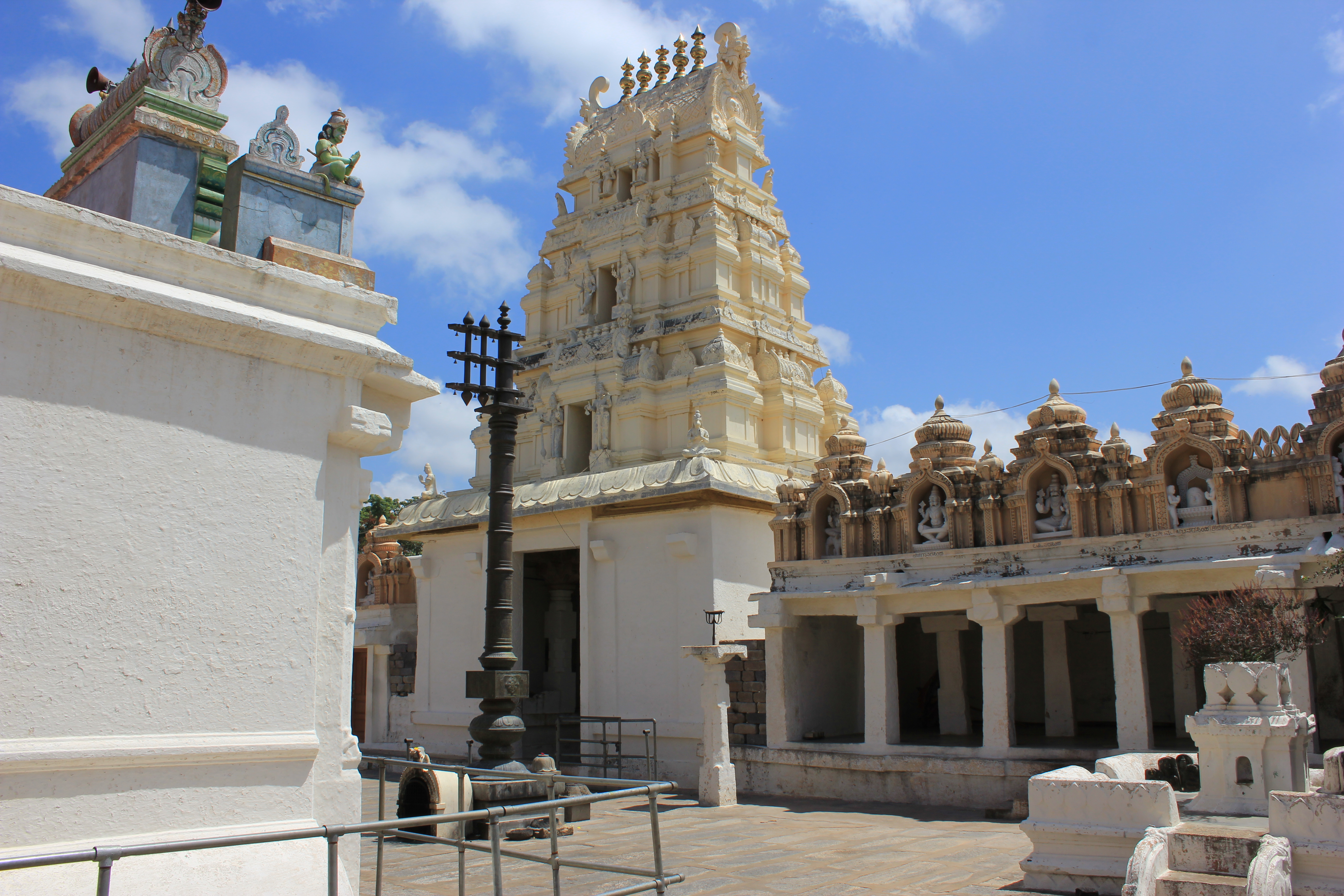
- Narasimha Swamy temple (1800 AD) at Seebi in Tumkur district
- Interactive map of Seebi Narasimha Swamy Temple
- Coordinates: 13°31′50″N 77°00′05″E
- Country: India
- State: Karnataka
- District: Tumkur District
- Established: 1797
- Founder: Fauzdar Nallappa

Government
  - Body: Private Hereditary Family Board

Languages
  - Official: Kannada
- Time zone: UTC+5:30 (IST)
- Postal code: 572128
- Website: http://seebikshetra.com/

The Narasimha Swamy temple at Seebi (also spelt Sibi) is located in the Sira taluk of Tumkur district, in the Indian state of Karnataka. Seebi is located on National Highway 4, just 20 km north of Tumkur city.

== History and legend ==
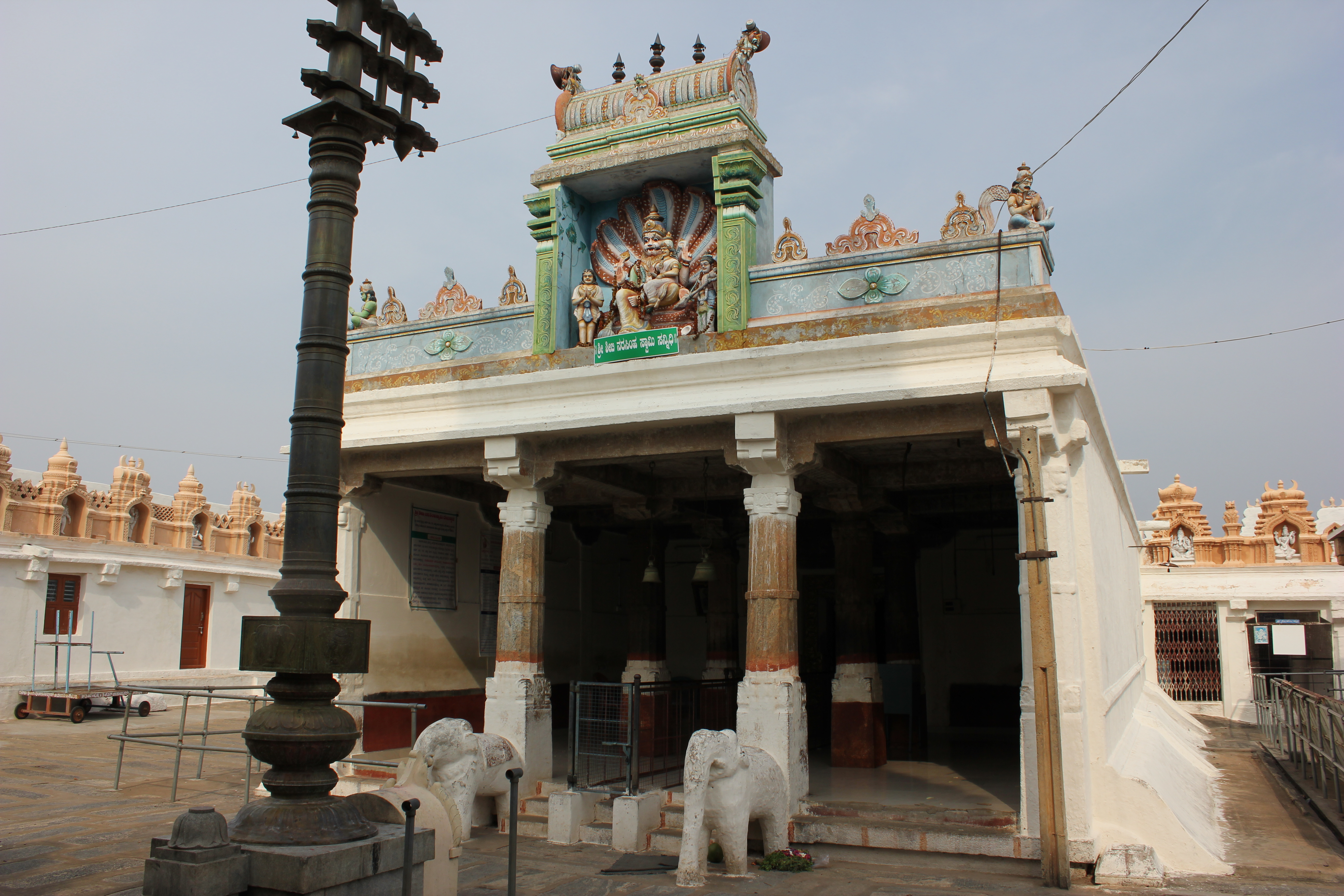
Entrance mantapa of the Narasimhaswamy temple at Seebi

According to the renowned British Raj era historian and epigraphist B. Lewis Rice, legend has it that once a merchant carrying grain on bullocks stopped at Sibi. When a pot of grain was boiled on a projecting rock, its color turned blood red causing the merchant, his attendants and the buffalos to swoon. While in the unconscious state, the god Narasimha appeared in the merchant's dream and informed him the rock was his abode and that the merchant should build a temple for him at that spot as atonement for desecrating his abode. A small temple was thus built by the merchant. In more recent times, the consecration of a larger temple over the pre-existing shrine was taken up by three wealthy brothers: Lakshminarasappa, Puttanna and Nallappa who were the sons of Kacheri Krishnappa, a Dewan in the court of King Tipu Sultan of the Mysore Kingdom. Story goes that Nallappa had a dream in which the god Narasimha promised him eternal happiness if a temple was raised where it stands today. The completion of the temple construction took ten years. The Narasimha Swamy temple is a simple yet elegant Dravidian structure built around the end of the 18th century. The main deity of the temple is Narasimha, an avatar (incarnation) of the Hindu god Vishnu.

== Architecture and murals ==
The tower over the entrance is three tiered and the temple has a large prakara (bounding wall) which makes for a large court yard. The open mantapa (hall) leads to a closed mantapa (or navaranga) which has minor shrines for several Hindu deities: Rama, Ambegal Krishna, Sriranga (a form of Vishnu in the reclining posture), Narasimha (Vishnu with the head of a Lion), Ganesha and Saptamatrika.

The main attraction in the temple are the mural paintings on the ceiling and walls of the mukhamantapa (entrance hall) which depict courtly as well as religious themes such as scenes from the Hindu puranas (epics): the Bhagavata, the Narasimha Purana, the Ramayana and the Mahabharata. The murals follow the same artistic idiom found in the murals of the Daria Daulat Bagh in Srirangapatna. According to the critic Veena Shekar, the art of mural paintings migrated to Karnataka and the murals in this temple are "folkish" in character. According to the art historian George Michell, the murals of this temple are among the best from the Mysore period and the courtly paintings depicting processions exude a Mogul influence.

The murals on the walls and ceiling are divided into three rows: The first row depicts the Krishna Leela ("Krishna's play") of the god Krishna, the second row depicts a scene from the court of Maharaja Krishnaraja Wodeyar III with Nallappa (one of the sons of the Dewan Krishnappa) in attendance, while the third row depicts a scene from the court of Haidar Ali and his son Tipu Sultan with Kacheri Krishnappa, and Ravanappa and Venkatappa (maternal uncles of Nallappa who held high posts) in attendance. According to Veena Shekar, based on the style, the portrait of Maharaja Krishna Raja Wodeyar III (who ruled after the death of Haider and Tipu Sultan) may have been incorporated in the early 19th century. The ceiling of the main entrance mantapa has a mural in which the god Krishna plays the flute to other cowherd friends while watching Tipu Sultan fighting a Tiger. The ceiling has four beams each with a mural: the first depicts riderless horses followed by elephants; the second depicts horsemen wearing conical caps (common during the Vijayanagara era) with some horsman in gallop, others carrying flags and a couple on foot; the third depicts horseman, some riding and others on foot followed by elephants and a cart carrying cannons. Michell concurs regarding the likeness these murals bear to the ones in the Virupaksha temple at Hampi as well as at the Siddheshvara temple at Holalgundi, also a late 18th-century construction.

== Gallery ==
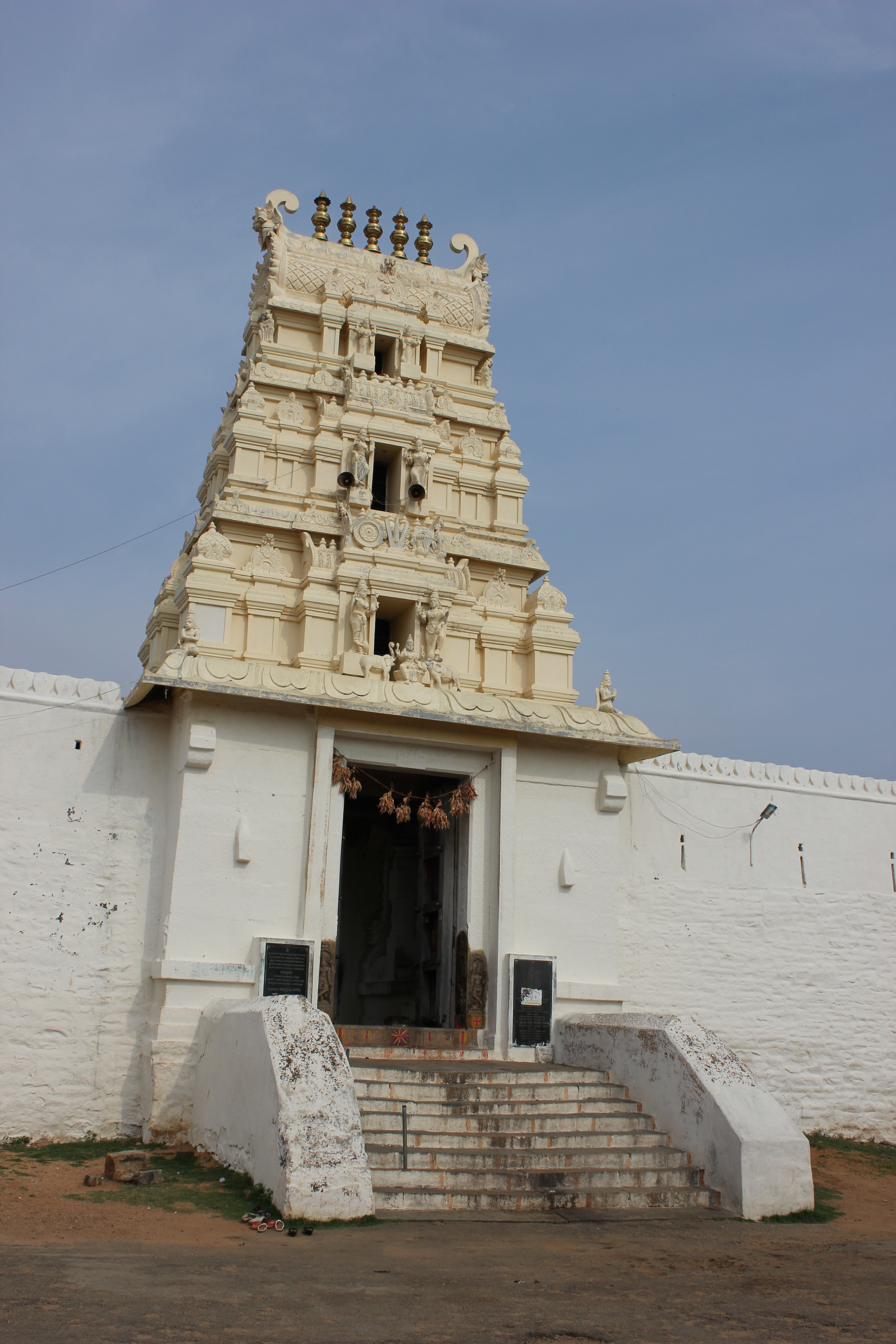
Gopura of Narasimhaswamy temple at Seebi

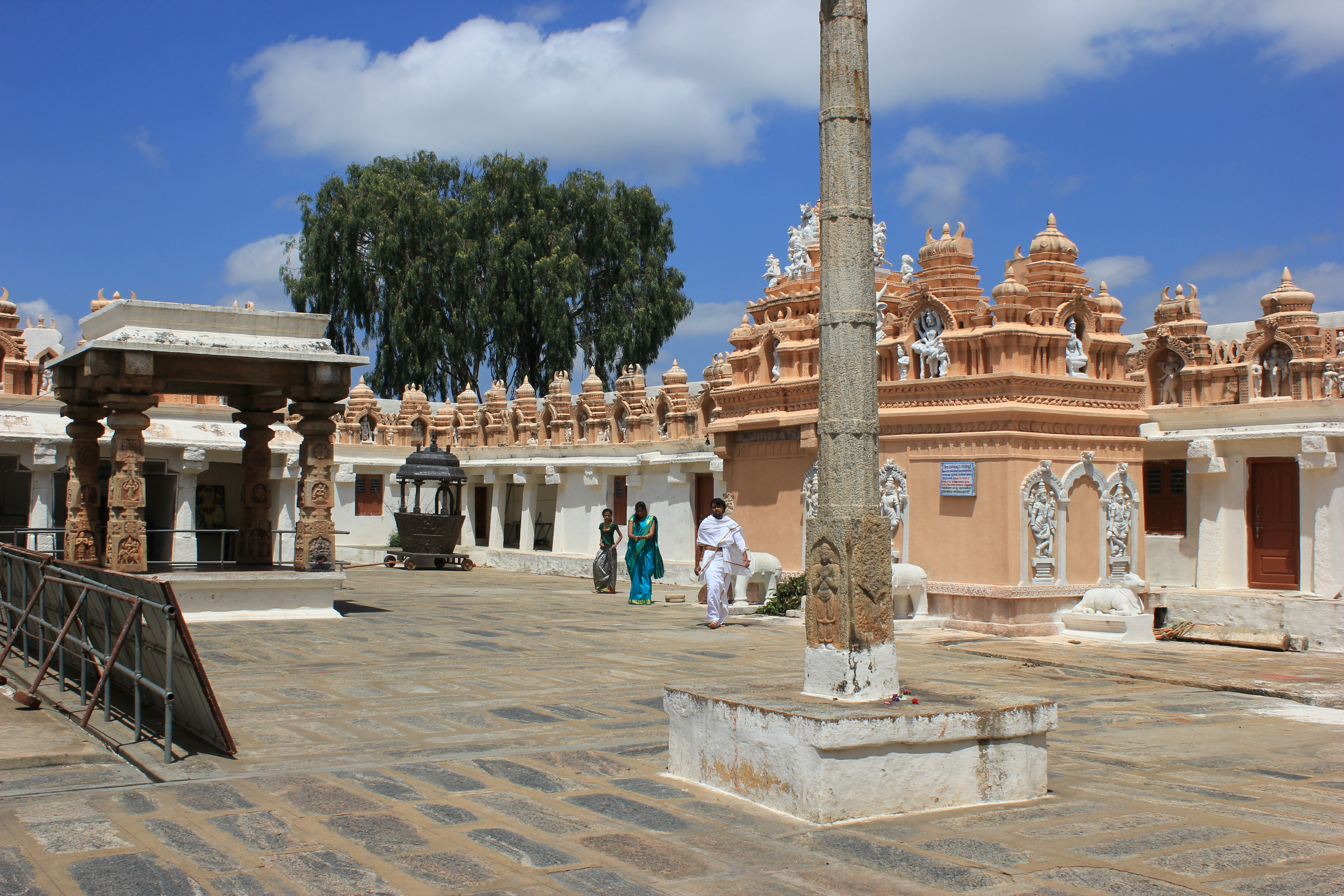
View of courtyard of the Narasimha Swamy temple at Seebi

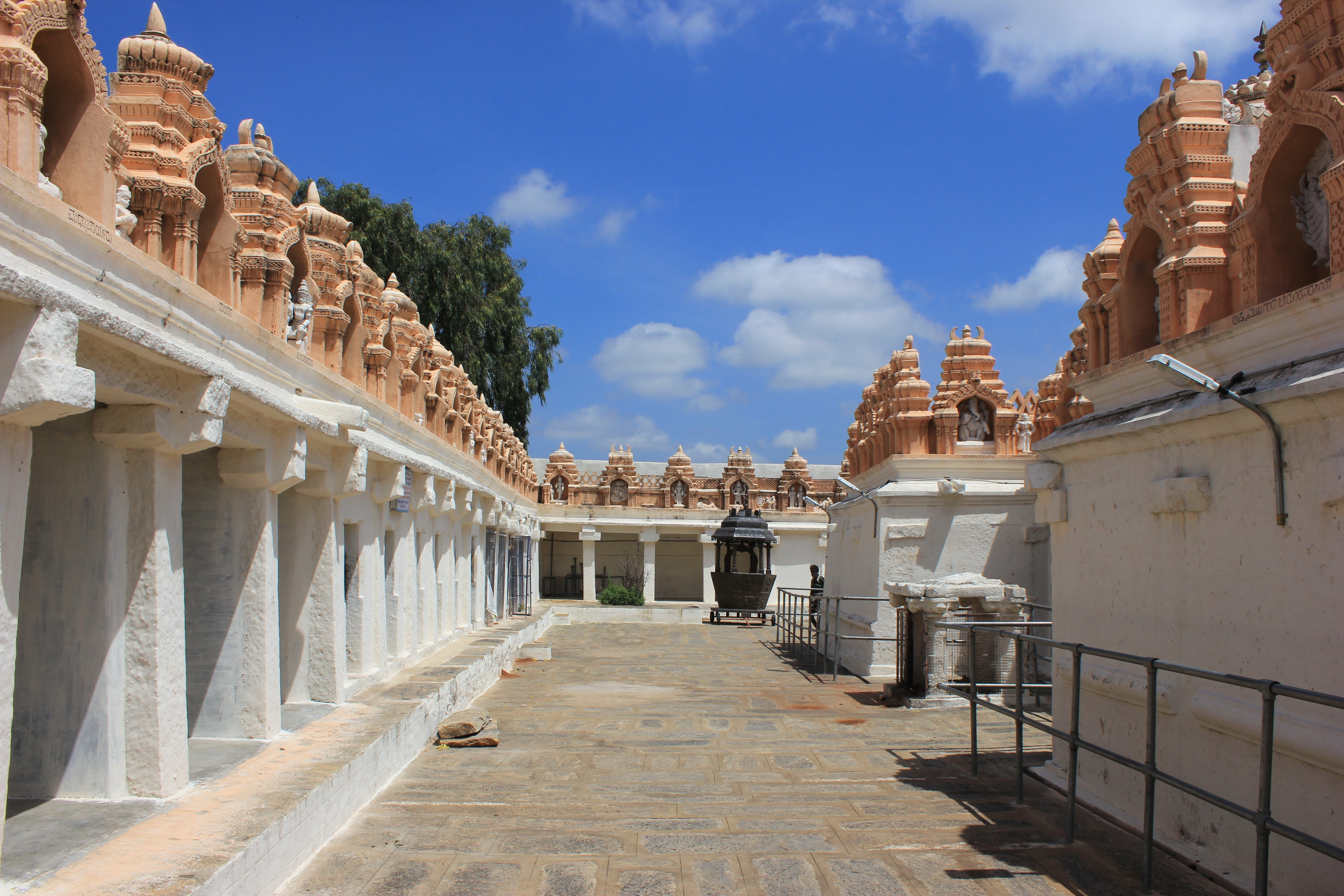
View of rear courtyard of the Narasimha Swamy temple at Seebi

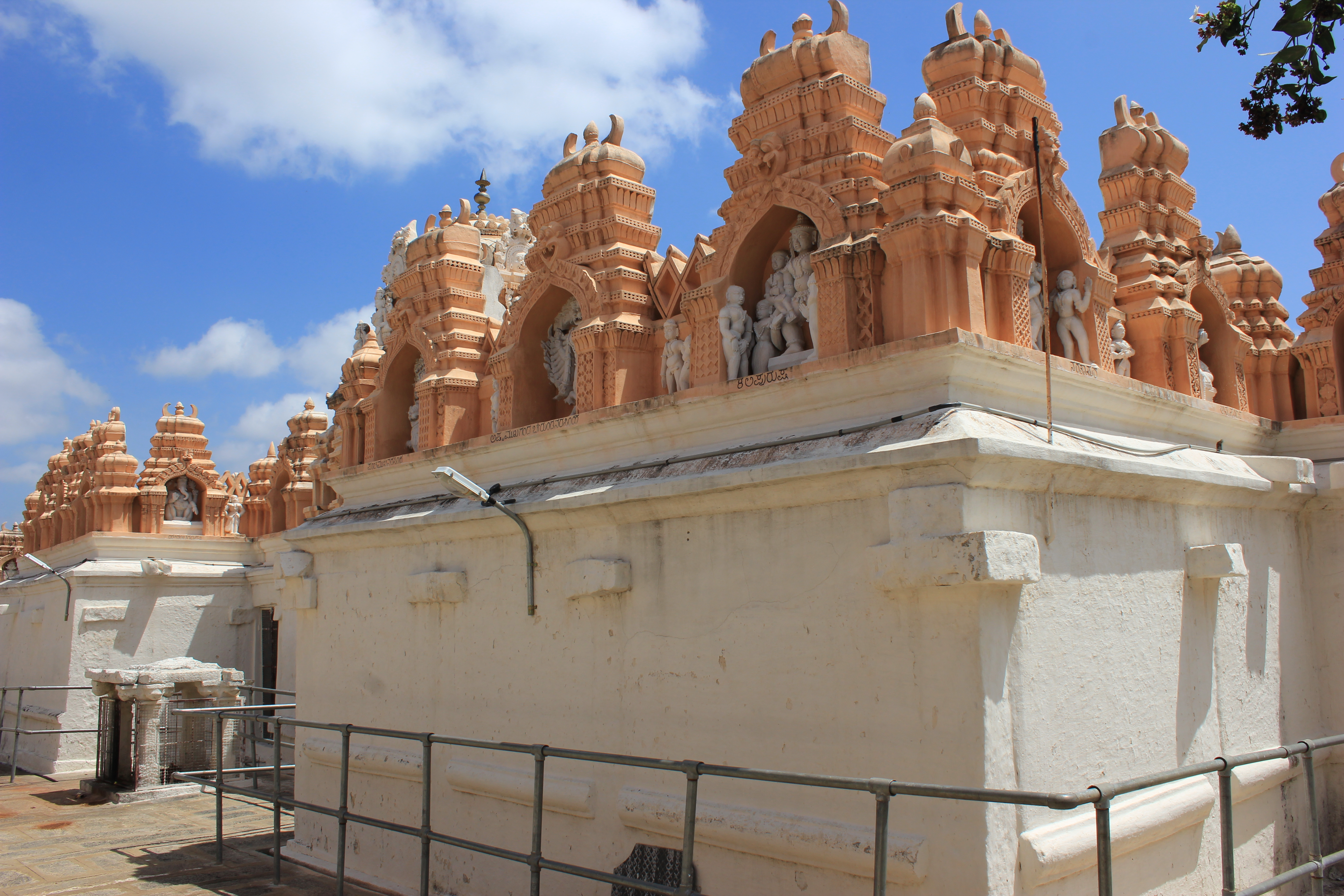
Dravidian style Shikhara (superstructure) over shrines in the Narasimha Swamy temple at Seebi

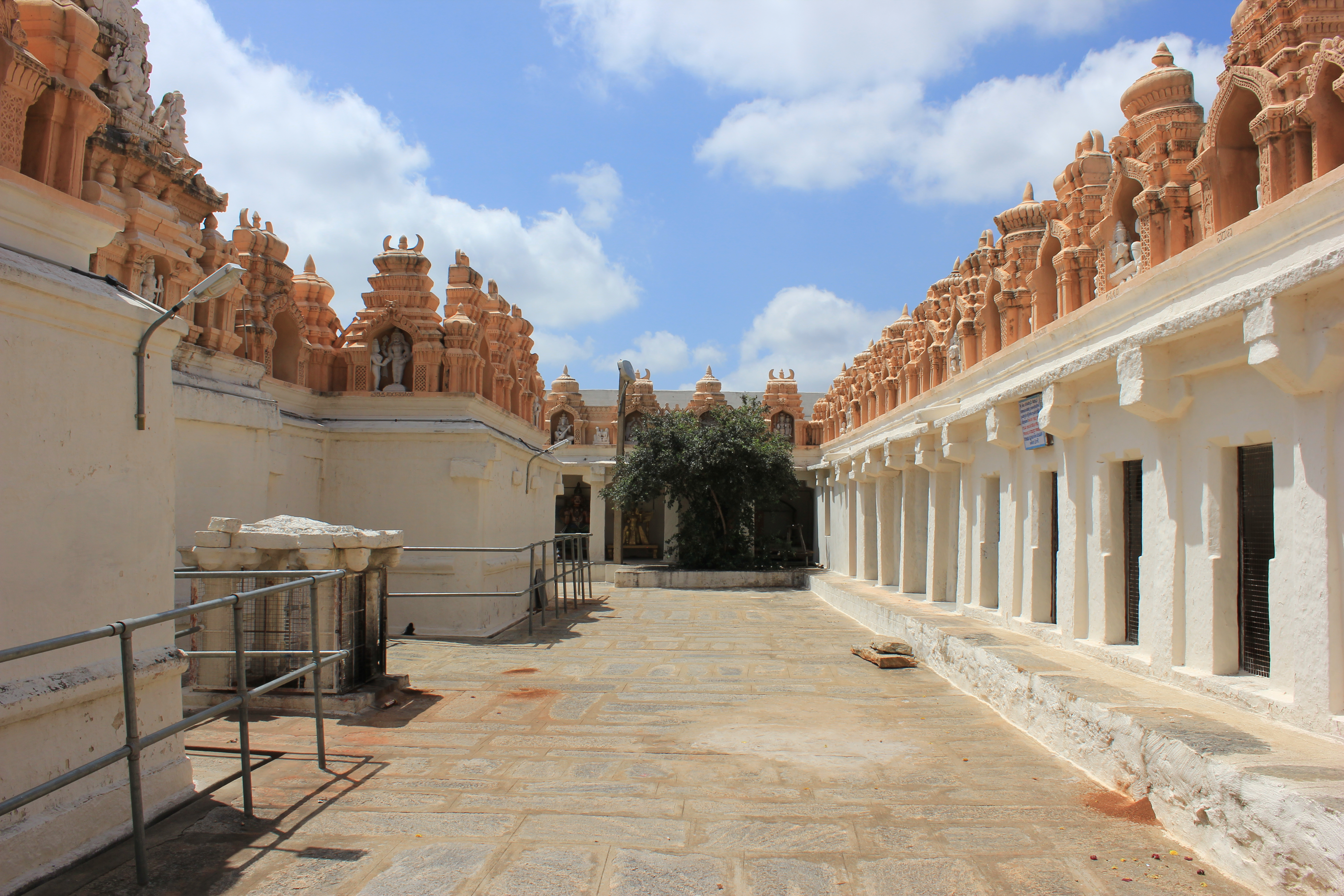
Rear courtyard of the Narasimha Swamy temple at Seebi

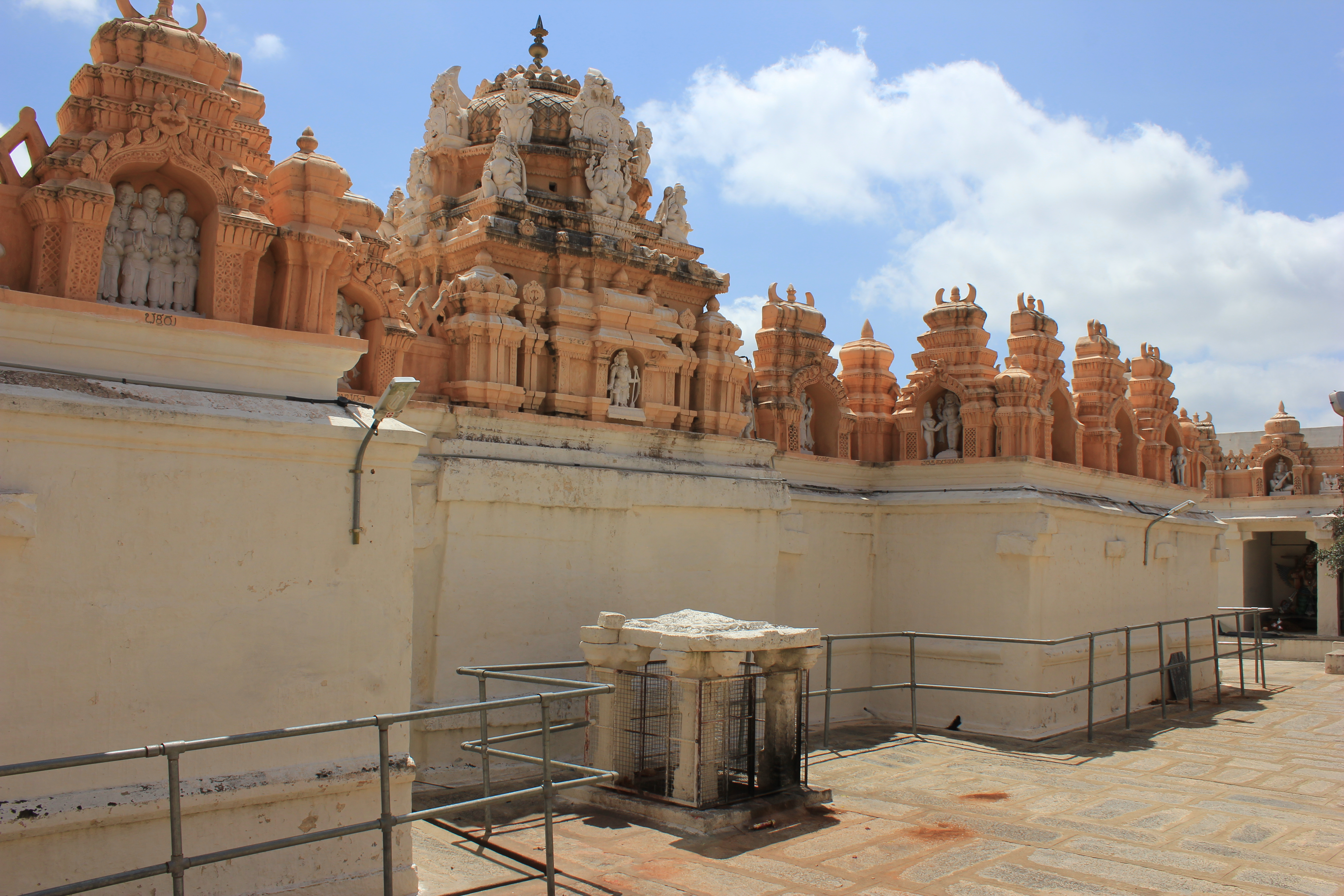
ravidian style Shikhara (superstructure) over shrines in the Narasimha Swamy temple at Seebi

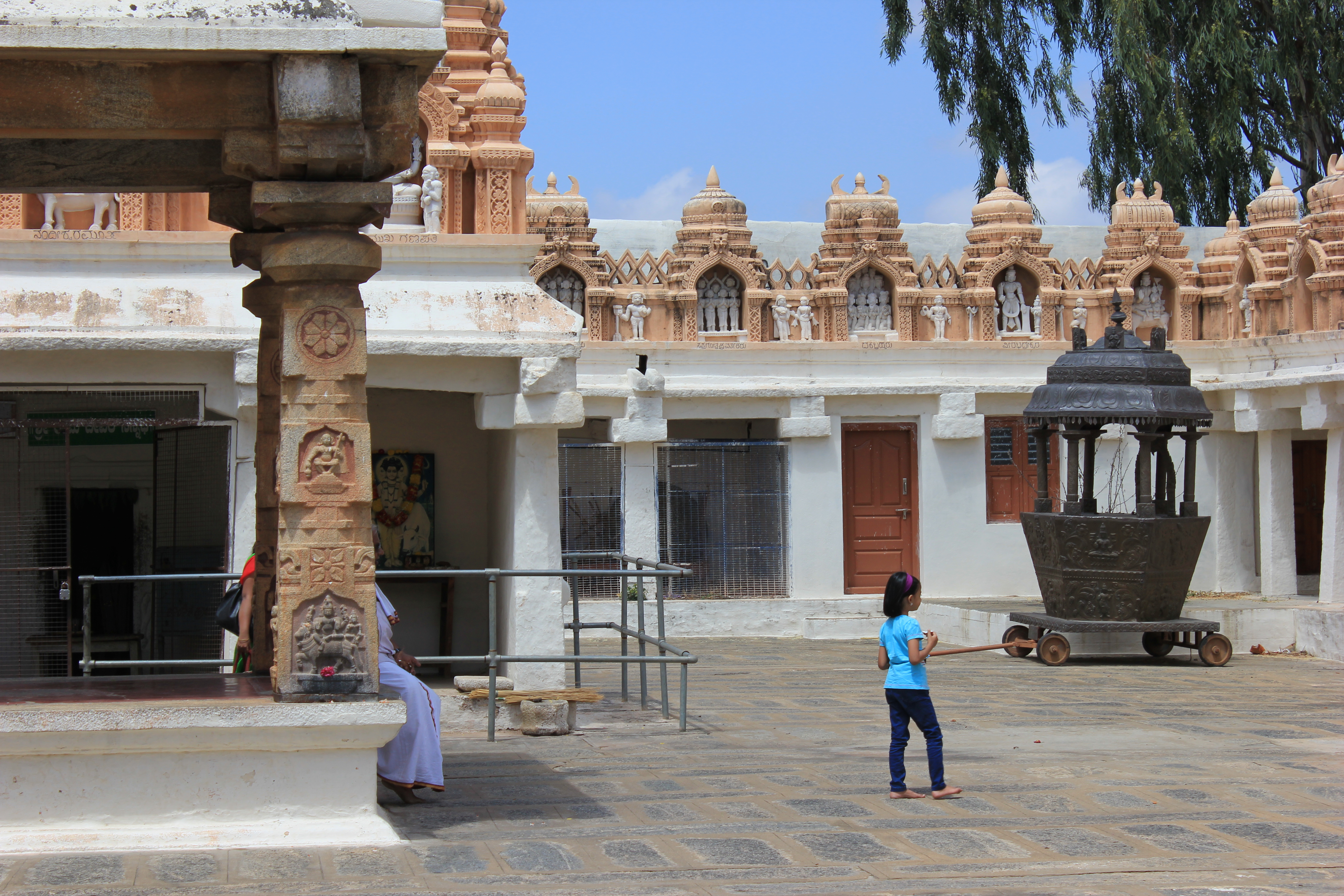
Courtyard of the Narasimha Swamy temple at Seebi
