= Puttur Shree Mahalingeshwara Temple =

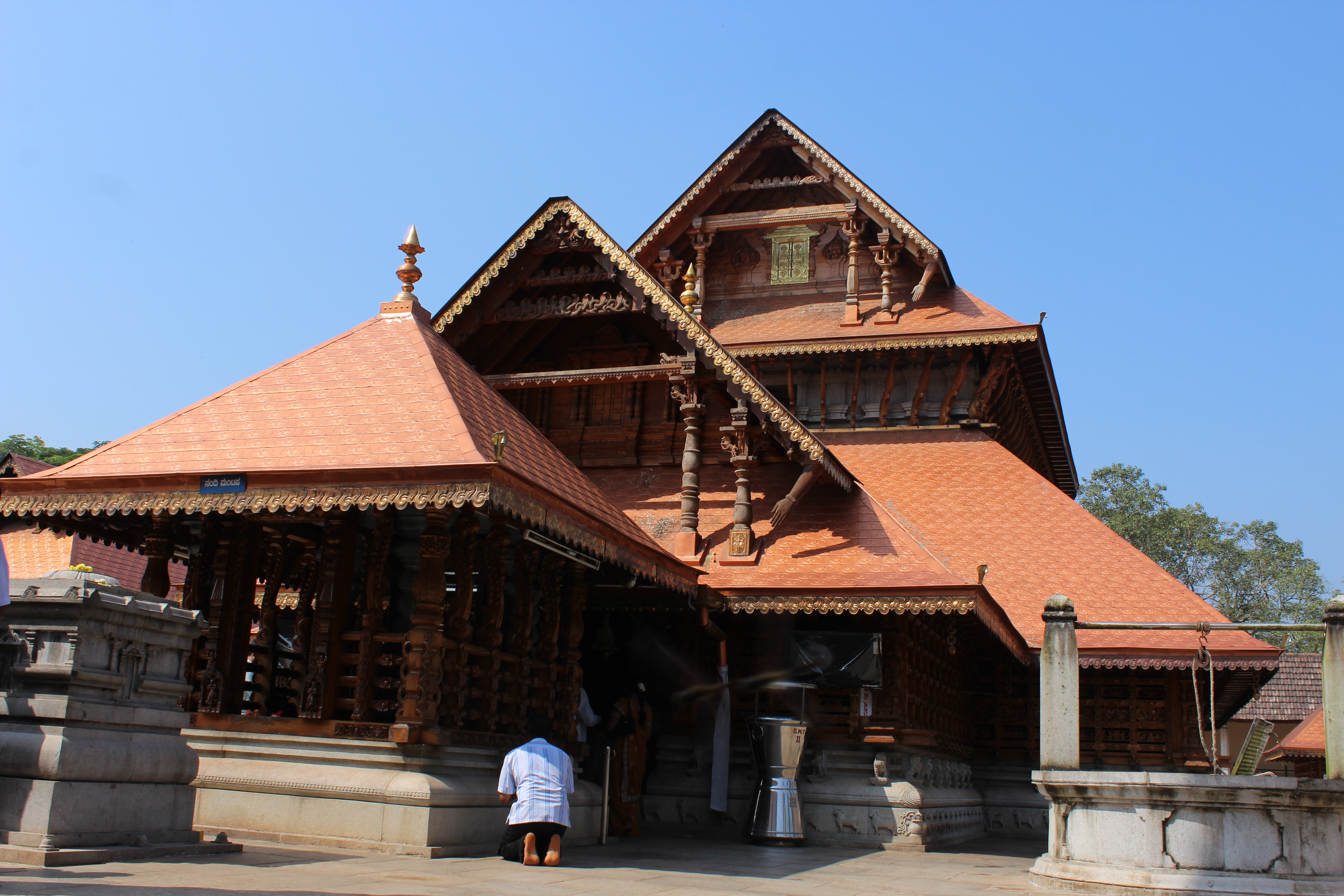
- Puttur Shree Mahalingeshwara Temple

- Location in Karnataka

Religion
- Affiliation: Hinduism
- District: Dakshina Kannada district
- Deity: Mahalingeshwara(Lord Shiva)
- Festivals: Mahashivarathri, Puttur Bedi(Main Festival), Lakshadeepothsava, Navarathri, Deepavali
- Governing body: Department of Muzarai, Department of Muzarai, Government of Karnataka
- Features: Temple tree: Ashwatha Tree

Location
- Location: Puttur
- State: Karnataka
- Country: India
- Interactive map of Puttur Shree Mahalingeshwara Temple
- Coordinates: 12.768°N 75.207°E

Architecture
- Type: Kerala architecture
- Creator: Banga King
- Completed: 8th Century AD

Specifications
- Temple: 1
- Monument: 2
- Inscriptions: Ashoka inscriptions
- Elevation: 87 m (285 ft)

Puttur Shree Mahalingeshwara Temple is a 12th-century temple, located in Puttur, Dakshina Kannada in the Indian state of Karnataka. Lord Shiva (popularly known as Puttur Mahalingeshwara) is the main deity.

== See also ==
- Polali Rajarajeshwari Temple
- Sri Gopalakrishna Temple Kumble
- Madhur Temple
- Kukke Subramanya Temple
