= Ashok Kumar Rai (Indian politician) =

Indian politician

Member of the Karnataka Legislative Assembly
- Incumbent
- Assumed office May 2023
- Preceded by: Sanjeev Matandoor
- Constituency: Puttur

Personal details
- Born: Karnataka, India
- Party: Indian National Congress

Ashok Kumar Rai is an Indian politician from Karnataka. He serves as a member of Karnataka Legislative Assembly representing Puttur. He belongs to the Indian National Congress.
