= Puttur, Karnataka =

Puttur
- City
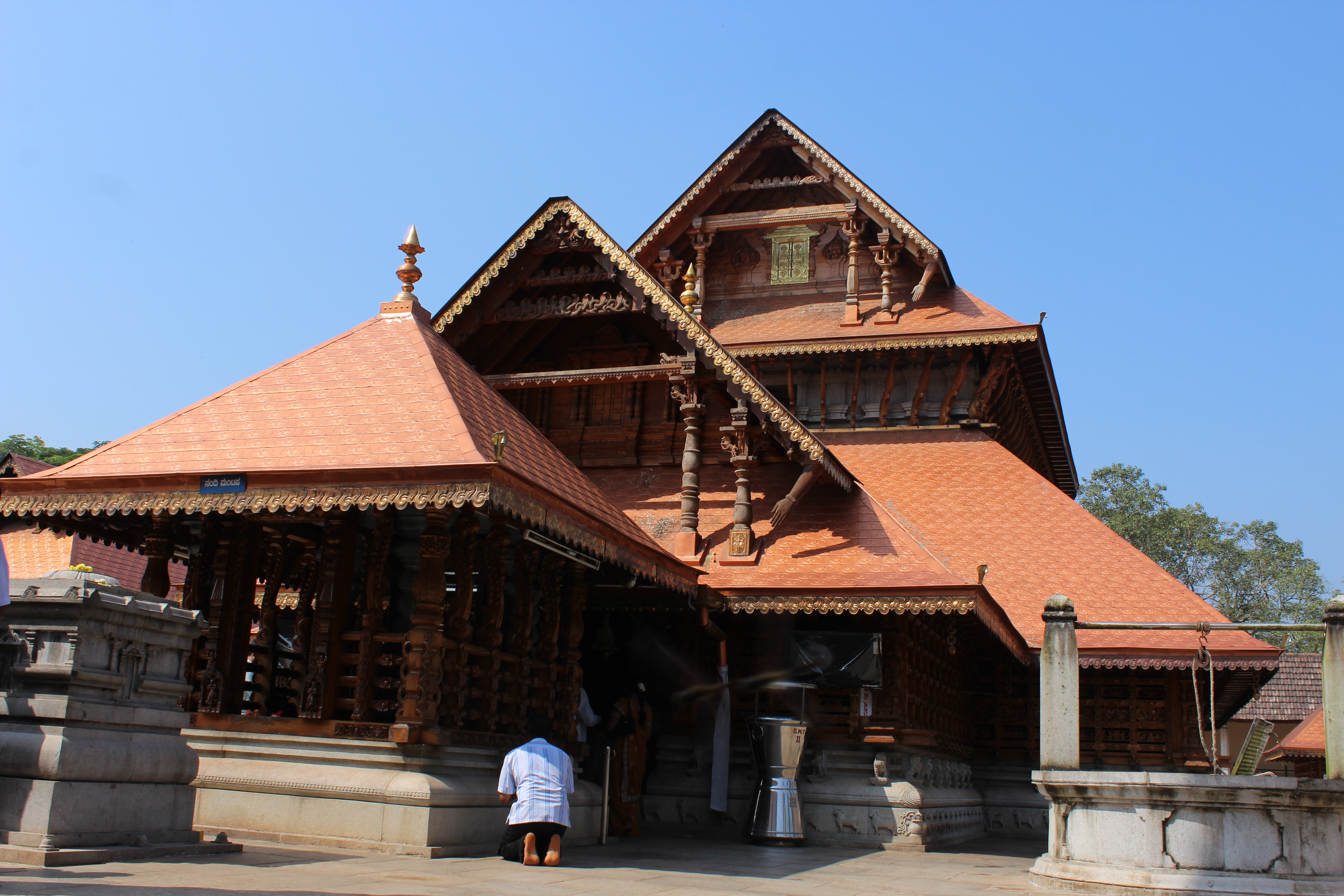
- Sri Mahalingeshwar Temple, Puttur
- Puttur in Karnataka
- Coordinates: 12.7648°N 75.1842°E
- Country: India
- State: Karnataka
- District: Dakshina Kannada

Government
  - Body: Puttur City Municipal Council
  - MLA: Ashok kumar Rai (INC)

Area
  - Total: 35.08 km^{2} (13.54 sq mi)
- Elevation: 87 m (285 ft)

Population (2011)
  - Total: 53,061
  - Density: 1,513/km^{2} (3,918/sq mi)
- Time zone: UTC+5:30 (IST)
- PIN: 574 201
- Telephone code: 8251
- ISO 3166 code: IN-KA
- Vehicle registration: KA 21
- Official language: Kannada,,Tulu
- Website: putturcity.mrc.gov.in

Puttur or Putthuru (Pronunciation:) is a city and taluka in the Dakshina Kannada district of Karnataka state in India. The Puttur Shree Mahalingeshwara Temple is located here.

== Geography ==
Puttur is located at 12.7648°N 75.1842°E. It has an average elevation of 87 m (300 ft). Puttur is situated 52 km (32 mi) south-east of Mangalore city.

=== Climate ===
Climate data for Puttur, India
Month	Jan	Feb	Mar	Apr	May	Jun	Jul	Aug	Sep	Oct	Nov	Dec	Year
Mean daily maximum °C (°F)	31.3 (88.3)	31.8 (89.2)	32.7 (90.9)	33.1 (91.6)	32.4 (90.3)	29.3 (84.7)	28.0 (82.4)	28.2 (82.8)	28.8 (83.8)	29.9 (85.8)	30.8 (87.4)	31.2 (88.2)	30.6 (87.1)
Daily mean °C (°F)	26 (79)	26.9 (80.4)	28.1 (82.6)	29.1 (84.4)	28.8 (83.8)	26.4 (79.5)	25.5 (77.9)	25.6 (78.1)	25.9 (78.6)	26.5 (79.7)	26.6 (79.9)	26.1 (79.0)	26 (79)
Mean daily minimum °C (°F)	20.8 (69.4)	22.0 (71.6)	23.6 (74.5)	25.2 (77.4)	25.2 (77.4)	23.5 (74.3)	23.0 (73.4)	23.1 (73.6)	23.0 (73.4)	23.2 (73.8)	22.4 (72.3)	21.0 (69.8)	21 (70)
Average rainfall mm (inches)	0 (0)	1 (0.0)	6 (0.2)	63 (2.5)	208 (8.2)	938 (36.9)	1,489 (58.6)	858 (33.8)	386 (15.2)	277 (10.9)	81 (3.2)	22 (0.9)	4,329 (170.4)
Source: Climate-Data.org - Climate Table of Puttur, Karnataka, India

== Demographics ==
As of 2011 India census, Puttur had a population of 48,063. Males constitute 50% of the population and females 50%. Hinduism is the major religion constituting to 65%, Muslims are about 22%, Christianity constitute 6% and other religions constitute 7%.

=== Languages ===
Tulu is the native mother tongue of most people in Puttur Taluk. A steady large scale migration of Malayalis from neighbouring Kerala into the Taluk has made Malayalam the 2nd most spoken language, followed by the state official language, Kannada and Beary. The Havigannada dialect is spoken by the Havyaka Brahmin community in Puttur.

Languages in Puttur taluk(2011)
1. Tulu (55.5%)
2. Malayalam (20.9%)
3. Kannada (8.30%)
4. Konkani (4.20%)
5. Others (11.1%)

== Notable places ==
Puttur Shree Mahalingeshwara Temple is a 12th-century temple, located in Puttur, Dakshina Kannada in the Indian state of Karnataka. Lord Shiva (popularly known as Puttur Mahalingeshwara) is the main deity.

== Media ==
=== Local news paper ===
Suddi Bidugade is the leading daily local news paper which is famous in the taluk. They have their e-papers available free of cost online. They also have a live online news portal which is providing reliable local news the entire day.

== See also ==
- South Canara District Central Co-operative Bank
