= Dakshina Kannada Lok Sabha constituency =

Lok Sabha constituency in Karnataka

Coordinates: 12.83°N 75.24°E

Dakshina Kannada KA-17
- Lok Sabha constituency

Constituency details
- Country: India
- Region: South India
- State: Karnataka
- Assembly constituencies: Belthangady; Moodabidri; Mangalore City North; Mangalore City South; Mangalore; Bantval; Puttur; Sullia
- Established: 2008
- Total electors: 1,765,281
- Reservation: None

Member of Parliament
- 18th Lok Sabha
- Incumbent Captain Brijesh Chowta
- Party: Bharatiya Janata Party
- Elected year: 2024

Dakshina Kannada Lok Sabha constituency formerly Mangalore Lok Sabha constituency is one of the 28 Lok Sabha (lower house of the Indian parliament) constituencies in Karnataka, a state in southern India.This constituency is closer to Kerala. This constituency was created as a part of the delimitation of the parliamentary constituencies in 2008. It first held elections in 2009 and its first member of parliament (MP) was Nalin Kumar Kateel of the Bharatiya Janata Party (BJP). As of the latest elections in 2024, Captain Brijesh Chowta represents this constituency. It comprises whole area of Dakshina Kannada district only.

== Assembly segments ==
Before delimitation in 2008, Belthangady Assembly segment was under Chikmagalur constituency and the Bantwal, Moodabidri Assembly segments, along with former Surathkal Assembly segment (now renamed as Mangalore City North) were under the Udupi constituency. In addition, the entire Kodagu district, comprising Madikeri, Virajpet and Somwarpet Assembly segments, was under the former Mangalore Lok Sabha constituency. After delimitation, Ullal and Mangalore Assembly segments were also renamed as Mangalore and Mangalore City South. As of 2019, Dakshina Kannada Lok Sabha constituency comprises the following Vidhan Sabha (legislative assembly) segments:

No	Name	District	Member	Party	2024 lead
200	Belthangady	Dakshina Kannada	Harish Poonja	BJP	BJP
201	Moodabidri	Dakshina Kannada	Umanatha Kotian	BJP	BJP
202	Mangalore City North	Dakshina Kannada	Y. Bharath Shetty	BJP	BJP
203	Mangalore City South	Dakshina Kannada	D. Vedavyas Kamath	BJP	BJP
204	Mangalore	Dakshina Kannada	U. T. Khader	INC	INC
205	Bantval	Dakshina Kannada	U. Rajesh Naik	BJP	BJP
206	Puttur	Dakshina Kannada	Ashok Kumar Rai	INC	BJP
207	Sullia (SC)	Dakshina Kannada	Bhagirathi Murulya	BJP	BJP

== Members of Parliament ==
Year	Member	Party
Till 2009 : See Mangalore
2009	Nalin Kumar Kateel	Bharatiya Janata Party
2014	Nalin Kumar Kateel	Bharatiya Janata Party
2019	Nalin Kumar Kateel	Bharatiya Janata Party
2024	Brijesh Chowta	Bharatiya Janata Party

== Election results ==
=== General Election 2024 ===
2024 Indian general election: Dakshina Kannada
Party	Candidate	Votes	%	±%
BJP	Brijesh Chowta	764,132	53.97	▼3.60
INC	Padmaraj Ramiah	6,14,924	43.43	▲6.28
NOTA	None of the above	23,576	1.67	▲1.12
Majority		149,208	10.54	▼9.88
Turnout		14,18,468	78.02	▲0.03
BJP hold		Swing		

=== 2019 ===
2019 Indian general elections: Dakshina Kannada
Party	Candidate	Votes	%	±%
BJP	Nalin Kumar Kateel	774,285	57.57	+4.34
INC	Mithun Rai	4,99,664	37.15	−4.18
SDPI	Ilyas Muhammed Thumbe	46,839	3.48	+1.22
NOTA	None of the Above	7,380	0.55	−0.04
Majority		2,74,621	20.42	
Turnout		13,45,039	77.99	
Registered electors		17,24,458		
BJP hold		Swing	+4.26	

=== General election 2014 ===
2014 Indian general elections: Dakshina Kannada
Party	Candidate	Votes	%	±%
BJP	Nalin Kumar Kateel	642,739	53.23	+4.07
INC	Janardhana Poojary	4,99,030	41.33	−3.85
SDPI	Haneef Khan Kodaje	27,254	2.26	N/A
CPI(M)	K. Yadava Shetty	9,394	0.78	−1.02
NOTA	None of the above	7,109	0.59	N/A
Margin of victory		1,43,709	11.90	+7.92
Turnout		12,07,583	77.15	+1.71
BJP hold		Swing		

=== General election 2009 ===
2009 Indian general elections: Dakshina Kannada
Party	Candidate	Votes	%	±%
BJP	Nalin Kumar Kateel	499,385	49.16	N/A
INC	Janardhana Poojary	458,965	45.18	N/A
CPI(M)	B. Madhava	18,328	1.80	N/A
BSP	Alekkadi Girish Rai	10,196	1.00	N/A
Independent	Subrahmanya Kumar Kuntikanamata	8,932	0.88	N/A
Independent	K. Rama Bhat Urimajalu	5,960	0.59	N/A
Independent	U. P. Shivananda	4,825	0.47	N/A
Independent	Vasudeva Gowda M. P.	3,180	0.31	N/A
Independent	Vicharawadi Ananda Gatty	2,373	0.23	N/A
Independent	Mohammed Sali	1,977	0.19	N/A
Independent	Thirumala Raya Halemane	1,801	0.18	N/A
Margin of victory		40,420	3.98	N/A
Turnout		1,015,922	75.44	N/A
BJP win (new seat)				

== See also ==
- Dakshina Kannada district
- List of constituencies of the Lok Sabha
- Mangalore Lok Sabha constituency
