= B. M. Idinabba =

Indian politician

- Born: 17 September 1920. Uppinangady, Puttur, Karnataka
- Died: 11 April 2009 (aged 88); Ullal, Karnataka, India
- Citizenship: Indian
- Occupations: poet, novelist, journalist
- Children: 6 (4 daughters and 2 sons)
- Writing career
- Notable awards: Rajyotsava Prashasti; 1987

B. M. Idinabba (17 September 1920 – 11 April 2009) was a prominent Kannada poet, journalist, freedom fighter, politician and a Kannada activist from Karnataka. He was a member of Congress party and was elected as a MLA three times in the Karnataka state assembly from Ullal constituency. He was one of the activists who fought for the unification of the Kasaragod district of Kerala into the Karnataka state. He has got the credit of being the first president of the Beary Sahithya Sammelana (Beary Literature Summit). He has received many prestigious awards including Rajyotsava Prashasti.

== Early life ==
Idinabba was born on 17 September 1920 in Uppinangady village in the Puttur taluk of Dakshina Kannada district, Karnataka. He belonged to the Beary community, who mainly resides in the coastal parts of Karnataka. He completed his schooling in Puttur, and later he was initiated into politics and literature by Peruvai Subbaiah Shetty and B. Shankar Narayan Rao.

== Career ==
Idinabba began his career in 1934 when he obtained a job in Dakshina Kannada Krishikara Sahakari Maarata Sangha and served in the Sangha for 34 years he retired in 1978.

His political career began in 1938. He associated with Indian National Congress and was elected as Member of the Legislative Assembly from Ullal Assembly constituency for three terms, i.e. in 1967, 1985 and 1989.

As a writer, he has published six novels, six collections of stories, six anthologies of poems and two children's literature. From 1970 to 1982, he served as the President of Dakshina Kannada Zilla Sahitya Parishat. He was also made an executive committee member of Bengaluru Kendra Kannada Sahitya Parishat, where he had served for twelve years and he was also a member of Karnataka Sahitya Academy. In 1988, he presided at the first Akhila Bharatha Beary Sahitya Sammelana which was held in Dakshina Kannada.

In 2005, he held the post of president of the Kannada Development Authority (KDA), which was his last political appointment. During his tenure as the head of KDA, he fought for the development of Kannada language and Kannadigas. He also advocated the implementation of the Mahajan Committee report on the Kasaragod border issue (to integrate the Kasaragod district into Karnataka) and Sarojini Mahishi Report on providing employment to Kannadigas in public sector units in the State. One of his main desires is to make Kannada the medium of instruction in Madrasas in Karnataka.

== Bibliography ==
- Balina Chitragalu
- Chutukurashi
- Harida Kotu
- Hridayageethegalu
- Hridaya Parivarthane
- Jenugoodu
- Kathagonchalu
- Manimale
- Ondu Gone Rasabale
- Rathnarashi

== Awards ==
Idinabba has been conferred with the following awards:

- Rajyotsava Prashasti in 1987
- Sandesh Prathisthan in 2000
- Pejawar Award in 2004
- Suvarna Karnataka Ekikarana Award in 2006
- Goruru Ramaswamy Ayyangar Award.
- Atthimabbe Award

In addition to these awards, he was also awarded several titles, like Kavya Vachana Bhushana, Kannadada Kogile, Sahitya Ratna and Kavya Jyothi.

== Personal life ==
Idinabba had four daughters and two sons.

== Death ==
Idinabba was suffering from physical disorders connected with old age. He died at the private hospital, which is near his residence in Ullal on 11 April 2009 at the age of 88.

His last rites were held at his residence in Ullal. His funeral was attended by Janardhana Poojary (former union minister), Pradeep Kumar Kalukura (President of the Dakshina Kannada District Sahitya parishat) and N. Yogish Bhat, J. Krishna Palemar, U. T. Khader (MLA's of Dakshina Kannada).
