= Mangalore Assembly constituency =

Constituency of the Karnataka legislative assembly in India

Coordinates: 12.92°N 74.84°E

Mangalore
- Constituency No. 204 for the Karnataka Legislative Assembly

Constituency details
- Country: India
- Region: South India
- State: Karnataka
- District: Dakshina Kannada
- Lok Sabha constituency: Dakshina Kannada
- Established: 2008
- Total electors: 205,149 (2023)
- Reservation: None

Member of Legislative Assembly
- 16th Karnataka Legislative Assembly
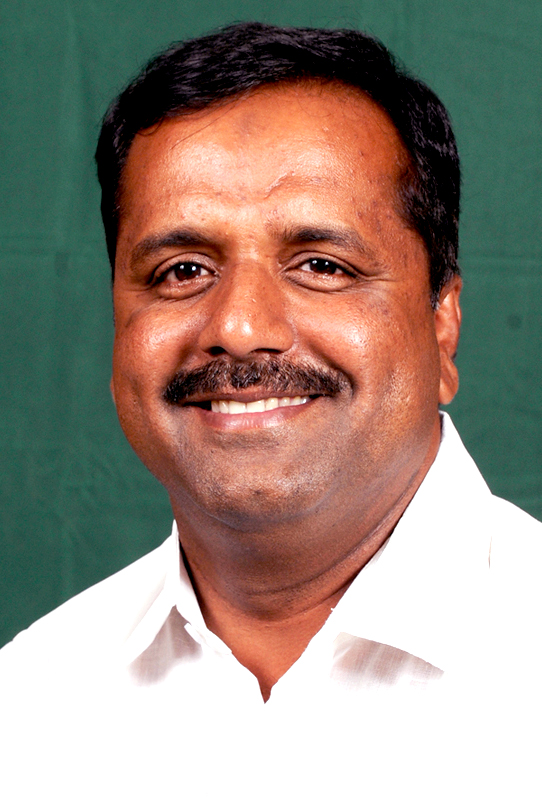
- Incumbent U. T. Khader
- Party: Indian National Congress
- Elected year: 2023
- Preceded by: U. T. Fareed

Mangalore Assembly constituency (former name Ullal) is one of the 224 constituencies of Karnataka Legislative Assemblies or Vidhan Sabha constituencies in Karnataka, India which belongs to Dakshina Kannada Lok Sabha constituency. Mangalore constituency, along with Mangalore City South and Mangalore City North, represents Mangalore City. The constituency has 45% Muslims population and 6% Christians.

== History ==
As per the "delimitation notification" issued by the Union Government in 2007, Vittla Assembly constituency was merged with Mangalore constituency which was previously known as Ullal.

== Members of the Legislative Assembly ==
| Election | Member | Party |
|---|---|---|
| 1952 | L. C. Pais | Indian National Congress |
| 1978 | P. F. Rodrigues | Indian National Congress |
| 1983 | V. Dhananjay Kumar | Bharatiya Janata Party |
| 1985 | Blasius D'Souza | Indian National Congress |
| 1989 | Blasius D'Souza | Indian National Congress |
| 1994 | N. Yogish Bhat | Bharatiya Janata Party |
| 1999 | N. Yogish Bhat | Bharatiya Janata Party |
| 2004 | N. Yogish Bhat | Bharatiya Janata Party |
| 2008 | Uppala T. Khader Fareed | Indian National Congress |
| 2013 | Uppala T. Khader Fareed | Indian National Congress |
| 2018 | Uppala T. Khader Fareed | Indian National Congress |
| 2023 | Uppala T. Khader Fareed | Indian National Congress |

== Election results ==
=== Assembly Election 2023 ===
2023 Karnataka Legislative Assembly election : Mangalore
| Party | Candidate | Votes | % | ±% |
|---|---|---|---|---|
| INC | Uppala T. Khader Fareed | 83,219 | 52.01% | ▼2.10 |
| BJP | Sathish Kumpala | 60,429 | 37.77% | ▼3.12 |
| SDPI | Riyaz Farangipete | 15,054 | 9.41% | New |
| NOTA | None of the above | 720 | 0.45% | ▼0.10 |
| Margin of victory | | 22,790 | 14.24% | ▲1.02 |
| Turnout | | 160,270 | 78.12% | ▲1.78 |
| Total valid votes | | 159,999 | | |
| Registered electors | | 205,149 | | ▲4.80 |
| INC hold | | Swing | ▼2.10 | |

=== Assembly Election 2018 ===
2018 Karnataka Legislative Assembly election : Mangalore
| Party | Candidate | Votes | % | ±% |
|---|---|---|---|---|
| INC | Uppala T. Khader Fareed | 80,813 | 54.11% | ▲9.64 |
| BJP | Santhosh Kumar Rai Boliyaru | 61,074 | 40.89% | ▲15.06 |
| JD(S) | K. Ashraf | 3,692 | 2.47% | ▲1.09 |
| CPI(M) | Nithin Kuthar | 2,372 | 1.59% | ▼0.85 |
| NOTA | None of the above | 821 | 0.55% | New |
| Margin of victory | | 19,739 | 13.22% | ▼5.42 |
| Turnout | | 149,436 | 76.34% | ▲2.09 |
| Total valid votes | | 149,358 | | |
| Registered electors | | 195,746 | | ▲16.29 |
| INC hold | | Swing | ▲9.64 | |

=== Assembly Election 2013 ===
2013 Karnataka Legislative Assembly election : Mangalore
| Party | Candidate | Votes | % | ±% |
|---|---|---|---|---|
| INC | Uppala T. Khader Fareed | 69,450 | 44.47% | ▼3.97 |
| BJP | Chandrahas Ullal | 40,339 | 25.83% | ▼15.88 |
| SDPI | Mohammed Akram Hasan | 4,808 | 3.08% | New |
| CPI(M) | K. Krishnappa Salian | 3,815 | 2.44% | ▼1.44 |
| JD(S) | Abdul Aziz Malar | 2,152 | 1.38% | ▼1.20 |
| Margin of victory | | 29,111 | 18.64% | ▲11.91 |
| Turnout | | 124,979 | 74.25% | ▲0.41 |
| Total valid votes | | 156,188 | | |
| Registered electors | | 168,319 | | ▲18.63 |
| INC hold | | Swing | ▼3.97 | |

=== Assembly Election 2008 ===
2008 Karnataka Legislative Assembly election : Mangalore
| Party | Candidate | Votes | % | ±% |
|---|---|---|---|---|
| INC | Uppala T. Khader Fareed | 50,718 | 48.44% | ▲6.08 |
| BJP | K. Padmanabha Kottary | 43,669 | 41.71% | ▼9.35 |
| CPI(M) | K. Yadava Shetty | 4,065 | 3.88% | New |
| JD(S) | Nazeer Ullal | 2,698 | 2.58% | ▲0.18 |
| Independent | Victor D'souza | 1,310 | 1.25% | New |
| BSP | Abdul Hameed Ullal | 1,227 | 1.17% | New |
| Margin of victory | | 7,049 | 6.73% | ▼1.97 |
| Turnout | | 104,767 | 73.84% | ▲9.52 |
| Total valid votes | | 104,702 | | |
| Registered electors | | 141,882 | | ▲55.67 |
| INC gain from BJP | | Swing | ▼2.62 | |

=== Assembly Election 2004 ===
2004 Karnataka Legislative Assembly election : Mangalore
| Party | Candidate | Votes | % | ±% |
|---|---|---|---|---|
| BJP | N. Yogish Bhat | 29,928 | 51.06% | ▼3.71 |
| INC | Lancelot Pinto | 24,827 | 42.36% | ▼2.11 |
| Independent | Sadashiva Das Pandeshwar | 1,552 | 2.65% | New |
| JD(S) | Aslam. D. M | 1,404 | 2.40% | ▲1.79 |
| Kannada Nadu Party | Mathai. K | 590 | 1.01% | New |
| Margin of victory | | 5,101 | 8.70% | ▼1.60 |
| Turnout | | 58,625 | 64.32% | ▼0.65 |
| Total valid votes | | 58,610 | | |
| Registered electors | | 91,140 | | ▼7.41 |
| BJP hold | | Swing | ▼3.71 | |

=== Assembly Election 1999 ===
1999 Karnataka Legislative Assembly election : Mangalore
| Party | Candidate | Votes | % | ±% |
|---|---|---|---|---|
| BJP | N. Yogish Bhat | 34,628 | 54.77% | ▲11.32 |
| INC | Blasius D'Souza | 28,116 | 44.47% | ▲14.82 |
| JD(S) | Sylviya D. Souza | 384 | 0.61% | New |
| Margin of victory | | 6,512 | 10.30% | ▼3.50 |
| Turnout | | 63,950 | 64.97% | ▲1.84 |
| Total valid votes | | 63,229 | | |
| Rejected ballots | | 706 | 1.10% | ▲0.43 |
| Registered electors | | 98,435 | | ▲6.83 |
| BJP hold | | Swing | ▲11.32 | |

=== Assembly Election 1994 ===
1994 Karnataka Legislative Assembly election : Mangalore
| Party | Candidate | Votes | % | ±% |
|---|---|---|---|---|
| BJP | N. Yogish Bhat | 25,106 | 43.45% | ▲7.25 |
| INC | Blasius D'Souza | 17,130 | 29.65% | ▼9.64 |
| JD | K. Suresh Ballal | 13,525 | 23.41% | ▲2.71 |
| INC | Benedicta D'souza | 814 | 1.41% | New |
| Independent | Bagilakeri Kamalaksha | 709 | 1.23% | New |
| Margin of victory | | 7,976 | 13.80% | ▲10.70 |
| Turnout | | 58,170 | 63.13% | ▼2.33 |
| Total valid votes | | 57,782 | | |
| Rejected ballots | | 388 | 0.67% | ▼2.36 |
| Registered electors | | 92,142 | | ▼3.19 |
| BJP gain from INC | | Swing | ▲4.16 | |

=== Assembly Election 1989 ===
1989 Karnataka Legislative Assembly election : Mangalore
| Party | Candidate | Votes | % | ±% |
|---|---|---|---|---|
| INC | Blasius D'Souza | 23,739 | 39.29% | ▼5.14 |
| BJP | N. Yogish Bhat | 21,869 | 36.20% | ▲10.37 |
| JD | Ramakrishna Nayak | 12,507 | 20.70% | New |
| JP | Antony S. Souza | 1,749 | 2.90% | New |
| Independent | P. V. Mohan | 458 | 0.76% | New |
| Margin of victory | | 1,870 | 3.10% | ▼12.81 |
| Turnout | | 62,301 | 65.46% | ▼0.26 |
| Total valid votes | | 60,413 | | |
| Rejected ballots | | 1,888 | 3.03% | ▲2.44 |
| Registered electors | | 95,179 | | ▲12.80 |
| INC hold | | Swing | ▼5.14 | |

=== Assembly Election 1985 ===
1985 Karnataka Legislative Assembly election : Mangalore
| Party | Candidate | Votes | % | ±% |
|---|---|---|---|---|
| INC | Blasius D'Souza | 24,494 | 44.43% | ▲7.15 |
| JP | Judith Mascarenhas | 15,725 | 28.53% | ▲14.27 |
| BJP | V. Dhananjay Kumar | 14,241 | 25.83% | ▼18.97 |
| Independent | Adah Hussain | 597 | 1.08% | New |
| Margin of victory | | 8,769 | 15.91% | ▲8.39 |
| Turnout | | 55,452 | 65.72% | ▼4.20 |
| Total valid votes | | 55,127 | | |
| Rejected ballots | | 325 | 0.59% | ▼0.33 |
| Registered electors | | 84,377 | | ▲14.31 |
| INC gain from BJP | | Swing | ▼0.37 | |

=== Assembly Election 1983 ===
1983 Karnataka Legislative Assembly election : Mangalore
| Party | Candidate | Votes | % | ±% |
|---|---|---|---|---|
| BJP | V. Dhananjay Kumar | 22,909 | 44.80% | New |
| INC | P. F. Rodrigues | 19,062 | 37.28% | ▲35.61 |
| JP | Padmanabha. K. M | 7,290 | 14.26% | ▼33.54 |
| AIML | K. Aboobakar Pravakara | 1,872 | 3.66% | New |
| Margin of victory | | 3,847 | 7.52% | ▲5.19 |
| Turnout | | 51,610 | 69.92% | ▼5.79 |
| Total valid votes | | 51,133 | | |
| Rejected ballots | | 477 | 0.92% | ▲0.10 |
| Registered electors | | 73,817 | | ▲4.53 |
| BJP gain from INC(I) | | Swing | ▼5.33 | |

=== Assembly Election 1978 ===
1978 Karnataka Legislative Assembly election : Mangalore
| Party | Candidate | Votes | % | ±% |
|---|---|---|---|---|
| INC(I) | P. F. Rodrigues | 26,579 | 50.13% | New |
| JP | Sharda Achar | 25,344 | 47.80% | New |
| INC | Addy Saldanha | 885 | 1.67% | ▼43.00 |
| Margin of victory | | 1,235 | 2.33% | ▼14.64 |
| Turnout | | 53,461 | 75.71% | ▲14.56 |
| Total valid votes | | 53,024 | | |
| Rejected ballots | | 437 | 0.82% | ▲0.82 |
| Registered electors | | 70,616 | | ▼13.44 |
| INC(I) gain from INC | | Swing | ▲5.46 | |

=== Assembly Election 1952 ===
1952 Madras State Legislative Assembly election : Mangalore
| Party | Candidate | Votes | % | ±% |
|---|---|---|---|---|
| INC | L. C. Pais | 22,285 | 44.67% | New |
| CPI | A. Shantha Ram Pai | 13,818 | 27.70% | New |
| Independent | C. L. Lobo | 6,649 | 13.33% | New |
| Socialist | D. Mohan Rao | 3,465 | 6.95% | New |
| ABJS | W. Anantha Mallaya | 2,949 | 5.91% | New |
| Independent | Y. Krishna Rao | 724 | 1.45% | New |
| Margin of victory | | 8,467 | 16.97% | |
| Turnout | | 49,890 | 61.15% | |
| Total valid votes | | 49,890 | | |
| Registered electors | | 81,580 | | |
| INC win (new seat) | | | | |

== See also ==
- Mangalore City South
- Mangalore City North
- Ullal City Municipal
- Ullal
