= South Kanara (South) Lok Sabha constituency =

Former constituency of the Indian parliament in Madras state

Coordinates: 12.6°N 75.4°E

South Kanara (South)
- Former Lok Sabha constituency

Constituency details
- Country: India
- Region: South India
- State: Karnataka
- Established: 1952
- Abolished: 1956
- Reservation: None

South Kanara (South) Lok Sabha constituency was a former Lok Sabha constituency in Madras State. This seat came into existence in 1951. With the implementation of States Reorganisation Act, 1956, it ceased to exist.

== Assembly segments ==
South Kanara (South) Lok Sabha constituency comprised the following six Legislative Assembly segments:

1. Panamangalore (Panemangalore)
2. Mangalore
3. Puttur (2 seats)
4. Kasaragod
5. Kanhangad

After South Canara District of erstwhile Madras State got merged with Mysore State in 1956, this seat ceased to exist and was replaced by Mangalore Lok Sabha constituency. The Parts of Kasargod and Hosdurg (Kanhangad) were merged with Kerala and became a part of Kasaragod Lok Sabha constituency.

== Members of Parliament ==
- Madras State: (as South Kanara (South))
  - 1952: B. Shiva Rao, Indian National Congress
- Mysore State: (as Mangalore)
  - 1957: K. R. Achar, Indian National Congress
  - 1962: A. Shanker Alva, Indian National Congress
  - 1967: C. M. Poonacha, Indian National Congress
  - 1971: K. K. Shetty, Indian National Congress
- Karnataka (as Mangalore)
  - 1977: Janardhana Poojary, Indian National Congress
  - 1980: Janardhana Poojary, Indian National Congress (Indira)
  - 1984: Janardhana Poojary, Indian National Congress
  - 1989: Janardhana Poojary, Indian National Congress
  - 1991: V. Dhananjay Kumar, Bharatiya Janata Party
  - 1996: V. Dhananjay Kumar, Bharatiya Janata Party
  - 1998: V. Dhananjay Kumar, Bharatiya Janata Party
  - 1999: V. Dhananjay Kumar, Bharatiya Janata Party
  - 2004: D. V. Sadananda Gowda, Bharatiya Janata Party

== See also ==
- Dakshina Kannada district
- Kasargod district
- Kasaragod Lok Sabha constituency
- List of former constituencies of the Lok Sabha
- Mangalore Lok Sabha constituency
- South Kanara (North) Lok Sabha constituency
- Udupi district
