= B. Shiva Rao =

Indian journalist and politician

Benegal Shiva Rao

Member of the Indian Parliament for South Kanara (South)
- In office 1952–1957
- Preceded by: Position created
- Succeeded by: K. R. Achar, as MP of Mangalore Lok Sabha constituency
- Majority: 8841

Personal details
- Born: 26 February 1891 Mangalore, Madras Presidency, British India (now Karnataka)
- Died: 15 December 1975 (aged 84) Delhi
- Party: Indian National Congress
- Spouse: Kitty Verstaendig
- Education: Presidency College, Madras
- Occupation: Journalist
- Profession: Politician

Benegal Shiva Rao (26 February 1891 – 15 December 1975) was an Indian journalist and politician. He was a member of the Constituent Assembly of India and an elected representative of the South Kanara constituency in the First Lok Sabha (later named Mangalore, currently Dakshina Kannada). He was the correspondent of The Hindu and then of the Manchester Guardian. He was also a member of the Rajya Sabha from 1957 - 1960 and a recipient of the civilian honour of the Padma Bhushan.

== Biography ==
B. Shiva Rao was born in Mangalore on 26 February 1891 into a distinguished Chitrapur Saraswat family. His father was B. Raghavendra Rao, a renowned medical practitioner. He graduated from the Presidency College, Chennai. His elder brothers were Benegal Narsing Rau and Benegal Rama Rau. He joined the labour movement and rose to vice president of INTUC. In 1929 he married Kitty Verstaendig, an Austrian. Early in his life, he came under influence of theosophical society and its leader Annie Besant. He was a correspondent of The Hindu and the Manchester Guardian. He is well known for his work Framing of India's Constitution (in six volumes, 1968). He was an ardent admirer of Gandhi but one of the first to criticize his strategy for national movement. His objectivity and deep analysis endeared him to his readers including Nehru, Gandhi and S. Radhakrishnan. His participation in International labour movement continued after independence as delegate to UN and ILO where he worked with Mrs. Vijaylakshmi Pandit and Babu Jagjeevan Ram. He remained member of Lok Sabha from 1952–57 and Rajya Sabha from 1957–1960. After that, he retired from public life and concentrated on research. He also edited papers of his brother B. N. Rau as India's Constitution in the Making (1960). He was one of contributors to Cyril Henry Phillips and Mary Doreen Wainwright edited The Partition of India:Policies & Perspectives 1935-47. His last work was India's Freedom Fighters: Some Notable Figures published in 1972 as a tribute to his departed colleagues. His other works are:

- What Labour has Gained from Reform in India (1923)
- The Problem of India (1926), co-written with David Graham Pole
- Select Constitutions of the World (1934)
- Industrial Worker in India (1939)
- India's Freedom Struggle: Some aspects (1968)
- India Goes to the Polls (1968)
- India's Role in UN (1968), co-written with Ǧaʻfar Riḍā'Bilġrāmī

He led the Indian Delegation to the United Nations General Assembly Sessions in 1947, 1948, 1949 and 1950.

On 15 Dec 1975, he died in New Delhi and was survived by his wife.
