= Holy Cross Church, Pavoor =

Building in India

Coordinates: 12.74770°N 74.90560°E

The Holy Cross Church, Pavoor, Kasaragod district, Kerala is a Roman Catholic Church (Latin Rite) and the only place in the world where a range of Catholic Church Services are conducted in Tulu.

== Unique identity ==
The Holy Cross Church is in Kerala, Kasargod Deanery, and with about a dozen churches, it comes under Catholic Diocese of Mangalore. It falls in Tulu Nadu, a region on the south-western coast of India, where the majority speakers speak the Tulu language. It consists of the Dakshina Kannada and Udupi districts of Karnataka, and the northern parts of the Kasargod district up to the Chandragiri river in Kerala. The Chandragiri river is traditionally considered to be a boundary between Tulu Nadu and Kerala. Because Tulu speaking kings ruled over the area like Kanyakumari ruled over by Malayali kings.

Whereas in other the churches in the Diocese of Mangalore the services are conducted in Konkani, English and Malayalam, the main Holy Mass at Pavoor Church at 7:30 am (IST) on Sundays, is in Tulu. The service at 11 am, mainly for children, is in a cocktail of languages. On the first Sunday of the month the service is in Konkani, on the second Sunday in Tulu and on the third and fourth Sundays in Kannada. At the main morning service, the hymns are sung in Tulu, prayers are recited in Tulu and the sermon is preached in Tulu.

== History ==
There is a book of prayers in Tulu titled Dyanada Book (lit. book of knowledge). There is also a hymn book titled Bhakti Gitolu (lit. Prayer hymns).

Tulu in this church is not a modern inculturation transplant. The credit for introducing Tulu at Pavoor Church goes to an Italian Jesuit priest who came to Mangalore in 1897. Fr Alexander Camissa, born in 1868 in Italy, spent one year at Suratkal, Mangalore taluk learning Tulu. He continued his Tulu studies at Jeppu Seminary where he was a teacher. While there, he came across persons belonging to a nomadic tribe who made a miserable living weaving baskets and doing odd jobs for a pittance.

When Fr Alexander started the Pavoor Mission in 1913, it was a barren landscape. He obtained 300 acres (1.2 km^{2}) of land from the government and settled them there. For the first time they had land of their own to settle down and give up their nomadic life.

Thus, the Tulu language services were initiated because the original settlers of Pavoor parish were illiterate, knowing neither Kannada nor Konkani, the dominant church service languages in the region. Even today the original settlers constitute about 95% of the 110 families in the parish, the rest 10 being Konkanis. But, today the settlers are better educated and economically advanced.
