= Bantwal Vaikunta Baliga =

Indian politician and lawyer

5th Speaker of Mysore Legislative Assembly
- In office 15 March 1962 – 6 June 1968
- Preceded by: S. R. Kanthi
- Succeeded by: S. D. Kotavale

Member of the Mysore Legislative Assembly
- In office 1962–1968
- Preceded by: Ratnavarma Hegde
- Succeeded by: K. Subramanya Gowda
- Constituency: Belthangady
- In office 1 November 1956 – 1 April 1957
- Preceded by: Himself
- Succeeded by: K. Nagappa Alva
- Constituency: Panemangalore
- In office 1957–1962
- Preceded by: L. C. Pais
- Succeeded by: Manel Srinivas Nayak
- Constituency: Mangalore City

Member of the Madras Legislative Assembly
- In office 1 April 1952 – 31 October 1956
- Preceded by: Position Established
- Succeeded by: Himself
- Constituency: Panemangalore

Personal details
- Born: 1895 Bantwal, Madras Presidency, British India, (now in Bantwal, Karnataka, India)
- Died: 1968 (aged 72–73) Mysore state, India
- Spouse: Sharada
- Education: BA, LLB

Bantwal Vaikunta Baliga (1895–1968) was an Indian lawyer who played an active role in Indian governance and politics. He was actively involved in India’s struggle for freedom, sometimes working personally with Mahatma Gandhi. He was elected as MLA and subsequently became the Law Minister and Speaker of the Mysore State Assembly. His term as Speaker spanned from March 1962 to June 1968. He is remembered for his parliamentary acumen, knowledge of legislative business, and understanding of parliamentary procedure. As the Speaker he was known to be very strict in conducting the House proceedings.

He was also the founder president of Karnataka Library Association.

The Vaikunta Baliga College of Law was established in the year 1957 and is named after Late Sri. Bantwal Vaikunta Baliga, a legal luminary and then minister of Law, Government of Mysore.

Baliga was born to a Konkani people family on 10 April 1895 at Bantwal, sixteen miles from Mangalore. He did his early schooling in the Venkataramana school, and the Basel Evangelical Mission school in Mangalore. After clearing his intermediate examinations in Arts from St. Aloysius College, he went to Madras for higher education and passed from the Pachaiyappa's College Chennai and the University Examinations securing MacDonald Gold Medal for the year 1916-17. He studied Law at the Law College at Madras and set up practice in Mangalore.

Baliga joined the Canara Banking Corporation Ltd., (later become Corporation Bank) as a Director in about 1926 and continued as a Director till 1957, resigning the Directorship consequent upon the acceptance of a seat in the Mysore Cabinet. He was also the Director and Chairman of the Board of Directors of the Canara Public Conveyance Company, Limited and Chairman of the Board of Directors of the Canara Mutual Assurance Company Ltd. until its nationalisation.

He was the Inaugural President of the Academy of General Education at Manipal which later became Manipal Academy of Higher Education. He delivered the Inaugural Convocation address at Kasturba Medical College wherein he said "One should not be surprised if by the grace of God and the effort of man, Manipal goes down in history as a modern Navadwip of Gauranga days or Kashi Vidyapeet of old. One need not get disheartened by the small beginnings of the institution. It is pregnant with possibilities. Great things have all come out from small and humble beginnings."

He was an Honorary Life Member of the Kanara Chamber of Commerce for services rendered in establishing the Kanara Chamber of Commerce and was the President of the Chamber for one year. He was a member of the Council of the Management of the Canara High School and the associated group of institutions.

He was the Vice-President and later, the President of Iswarananda Mahila Sevashram at Mangalore, an organization which worked towards the upliftment of women.

He served as the Chairman of the Board of Directors of the General Investment Trust, Ltd.(now defunct), and the President of Deenabandhu Seva Sangha (now defunct), Mangalore; a member of the District Board and the Leader of the Congress Party in 1942 and resigned membership and came out of the Board.

He was elected a member of the Madras Legislative Assembly and was a member of the Hospital Advisory Committee in Mangalore and a member of the Development Board of South Kanara. He Amended the bill for the Reorganisation of states in 1956 in the Madras Legislative Assembly. He was elected Legislative Assembly from the Mangalore City in the 1957 General Elections and was minister for Labor and Legal Affairs from April 1957 to May 1958; was again Minister for Law and Labor from February 1961 to March 1962. He was re-elected to the Mysore Legislative Assembly General Elections from Belthangady Constituency in 1967.

He died while he was the Speaker of Mysore State assembly on 6 June 1968. His death was condoled at the Madras Legislative Assembly.

Baliga married Sharada (nee Karkal Gowri Rao). They had 4 sons and 5 daughter, including Ram Krishna Baliga, who founded the Electronic City in Bangalore.
