= B. M. Farooq =

Indian businessman and politician

Member of the Karnataka Legislative Council
- In office 18 June 2018 – 17 June 2024
- Preceded by: Syed Mudeer Aga
- Succeeded by: T. N. Javarayi Gowda
- Constituency: elected by members of legislative assembly

Personal details
- Party: Janata Dal (Secular)
- Relations: Mohiuddin Bava (brother)

B. M. Farooq is an Indian politician and Mangalore-based businessman. His brother is former Indian National Congress MLA from Mangalore City North constituency, Mohiuddin Bava. On 4 June 2018, Farooq was elected unopposed to the Karnataka Legislative Council. Out of 11 seats, the INC won 4 seats, JD(S) 2 and BJP 5. He was the richest MLC candidate.
