= K. Nagappa Alva =

Indian politician

Member of Parliament, Rajya Sabha
- In office 3 April 1970 – 2 April 1976
- Constituency: Mysore State

Minister of Health and Family Planning, Government of Karnataka
- In office 1962–1967

Member of the Mysore Legislative Assembly
- In office 1957–1967
- Preceded by: Bantwal Vaikunta Baliga
- Succeeded by: Constituency abolished
- Constituency: Panemangalore

Personal details
- Born: 18 October 1908 Kodman, Madras Presidency, British India
- Died: 3 October 1996 (aged 87)
- Party: Indian National Congress
- Spouse: Kalyani Alva
- Children: 4, including Jeevaraj Alva
- Profession: Physician; politician

Kodman Nagappa Alva (18 October 1908 – 3 October 1996) was an Indian physician and politician from the State of Karnataka. As a politician, he served as Member of Parliament in the Rajya Sabha, the upper House of the Parliament of India, and as Minister of Health and Family Planning in the Government of Karnataka, then known as Mysore State. He was also prominent medical practitioner in his hometown of Mangalore. His biography with an eponymous title was published in 2010, written by Raghu Shettigar.

== Early life ==
Nagappa Alva was born on 18 October 1908 into Tulu-speaking Bunt family of Kodman Guthu Vithamma and Devu Alva. Nagappa was the youngest of four children. He was drawn into the Indian freedom struggle influenced by Karnad Sadashiva Rao in 1925, when he was a student in Mangalore. Alva earned a degree in medicine from Madras Medical College (MCC) in 1941. He was involved in student politics, identified himself as a Gandhian, and during his time at the MCC, was a member of the Madras Student's Union and took active part in the Indian freedom struggle. He set up medical practice in Mangalore in 1942 and proved to be a successful doctor.

== Political career ==
Alva's public life began in the 1940s during his medical practice in Mangalore. Between 1943 and 1949, he served as president of the Mangalore Circle Congress Committee. From 1949 to 1952, he was associated with the Dakshina Kannada District Congress Committee. During this period, he was also a member of the life Karnataka Pradesh Congress Committee. Other positions he held in this period include the presidency of the Mangalore Port and Dock Workers' Union, chairmanship of the District Board Public Health Committee, board member of the Mangalore Port Trust and presidency of the South Canara branch of the Indian Medical Association. In 1958, he was elected as member of the All India Congress Committee.

Alva contested the Panemangalore constituency with an Indian National Congress ticket in the 1957 Mysore State Legislative Assembly election and won. In 1958, he shifted medical practice to Bangalore. In 1962, he was reelected to the Assembly and, during this tenure, served as Minister of Health and Family Planning. He became the first from Dakshina Kannada district to hold a cabinet rank in the State. He unsuccessfully contested the Surathkal constituency in the 1967 election. In 1970, Alva was elected to Rajya Sabha, the upper house of the Parliament of India, and served a full-term of six years until 1976. Alva took part in the JP movement and was jailed during the Emergency after his tenure as a parliamentarian. In 1979, he replaced Philipose Koshy in a one-man commission that was appointed to inquire into the alleged medical negligence of Jayaprakash Narayan by the doctors of Postgraduate Institute of Medical Education and Research in Chandigarh, while he was in their charge during the Emergency. Alva later resigned from the commission. Later that year, he announced his retirement from electoral politics. He spent the rest of his life associating himself with other social service and religious organizations.

== Personal life ==
Alva was married to Kalyani of Kadenja Guthu. The couple had four children together: three sons and a daughter. Their eldest son, Mohandev, served as a corporator in the Bruhat Bengaluru Mahanagara Palike; Jayaprakash worked as a doctor; and the youngest, Jeevaraj, who also studied medicine, pursued a career in politics, and served as a cabinet minister in the government of Karnataka. Their daughter Sarojini Alva Changkakoti was educated in home sciences and resides abroad. Kalyani died in 1992, four years before Alva's death on 3 October 1996.

== See also ==
- Politics of Karnataka
