= Cascia High School =

Cascia High School may refer to:

- Cascia High School, a school in Jeppu
- St. Rita of Cascia High School, a school in Chicago
- Cascia Hall Preparatory School, a school in Tulsa
