= D. Vedavyas Kamath =

Indian politician

Member of Karnataka Legislative Assembly
- Incumbent
- Assumed office 2018
- Preceded by: John Richard Lobo
- Constituency: Mangalore City South

Personal details
- Party: Bharatiya Janata Party

D. Vedavyas Kamath is an Indian politician belonging to Bharatiya Janata Party(BJP). He was elected to the 15th Karnataka Assembly from Mangaluru City South constituency in Dakshina Kannada.

== Early life ==
Kamath was born on December 7, 1977, in Kundapur to D. Vaman Kamath and Tara V. Kamath. He has four siblings. He completed his primary and high school education in Canara School. He completed his BCom from Canara College, Mangalore.

== Career ==
Kamath is from Gaud Saraswat Brahmin community and he is a Rashtriya Swayamsevak Sangh affiliated with Sangh Parivar. Kamath served for a year as the general secretary of the Mangalore South BJP unit. In 2017, he was elected as Member of Legislative Assembly of Mangalore City South Assembly constituency in 2018 and he retained the constituency in the 2023 elections too.

He is the director of Bhuvanendra Cooperative Bank Mangalore. He has served as director of the Digantha Press. He has also renovated the Siddapura Venkataramana Education Trust at Kundapura.

== Social Work ==
Kamath is the founder of Sevanjali Charitable Trust which is involved in educational support, financial support and elderly support in Karavalli. He's actively involved in Hindu religious event and culture promotion such as Padavinangadi Ganeshostsava, Anna Santarpane by Mangala Cashew industries, Bhatkala Ganapathi temple, Car street Venkatramana Temple, etc.

== See also ==
- Y. Bharath Shetty
- Janardhana Poojary
- U. T. Khader
