= Adyanthaya =

Adyanthaya is an Indian surname, which originates among the Tulu Bunt people in the state of Karnataka. Adyanthaya means "the one who knows the beginning and the end" in Sanskrit. The name may refer to:

- Aravind Enrique Adyanthaya (born 1965), Puerto Rican writer
- N. M. Adyanthaya, Indian politician
