= Panemangalore Assembly constituency =

Former Assembly constituency in Karnataka, India

Coordinates: 12.872167°N 75.046437°E

Panemangalore
- Former constituency for the State Legislative Assembly

Constituency details
- Country: India
- State: Mysore State
- Division: Mysore
- District: Dakshina Kannada
- Lok Sabha constituency: Mangalore
- Established: 1951
- Abolished: 1967
- Reservation: None

Panemangalore Assembly constituency was one of the Karnataka Legislative Assemblies or Vidhan Sabha constituencies in Karnataka. It was part of Mangalore Lok Sabha constituency.

== Members of the Legislative Assembly ==
| Election | Member | Party |
|---|---|---|
| 1952 | Bantwal Vaikunta Baliga | Indian National Congress |
| 1957 | Dr. Alva Nagappa. K | Indian National Congress |
| 1962 | Dr. Alva Nagappa. K | Indian National Congress |

== Election results ==
=== Assembly Election 1962 ===
1962 Mysore State Legislative Assembly election : Panemangalore
| Party | Candidate | Votes | % | ±% |
|---|---|---|---|---|
| INC | Dr. Alva Nagappa. K | 16,170 | 47.69% | ▼10.94 |
| CPI | M. H. Krishnappa | 10,805 | 31.87% | ▼9.50 |
| SWA | M. Sadashiva Hegde | 5,323 | 15.70% | New |
| Independent | Mari Bhat | 907 | 2.67% | New |
| ABJS | Rama Mayya | 703 | 2.07% | New |
| Margin of victory | | 5,365 | 15.82% | ▼1.44 |
| Turnout | | 35,329 | 61.55% | ▲0.03 |
| Total valid votes | | 33,908 | | |
| Registered electors | | 57,395 | | ▲5.99 |
| INC hold | | Swing | ▼10.94 | |

=== Assembly Election 1957 ===
1957 Mysore State Legislative Assembly election : Panemangalore
| Party | Candidate | Votes | % | ±% |
|---|---|---|---|---|
| INC | Dr. Alva Nagappa. K | 19,533 | 58.63% | ▲14.54 |
| CPI | M. H. Krishnappa | 13,782 | 41.37% | ▲15.58 |
| Margin of victory | | 5,751 | 17.26% | ▲3.30 |
| Turnout | | 33,315 | 61.52% | ▲0.46 |
| Total valid votes | | 33,315 | | |
| Registered electors | | 54,150 | | ▼20.65 |
| INC hold | | Swing | ▲14.54 | |

=== Assembly Election 1952 ===
1952 Madras State Legislative Assembly election : Panemangalore
| Party | Candidate | Votes | % | ±% |
|---|---|---|---|---|
| INC | Bantwal Vaikunta Baliga | 18,369 | 44.09% | New |
| Independent | D. K. H. Alwa | 12,553 | 30.13% | New |
| CPI | A. Krishna Chetty | 10,745 | 25.79% | New |
| Margin of victory | | 5,816 | 13.96% | |
| Turnout | | 41,667 | 61.06% | |
| Total valid votes | | 41,667 | | |
| Registered electors | | 68,241 | | |
| INC win (new seat) | | | | |
