= Blasius D'Souza =

Indian politician

Blasius M. D'Souza
- Born: 22 February 1938; Mangalore, Karnataka, India
- Died: 26 January 2008 (aged 69); Mangalore, Karnataka, India
- Occupation: Politician

Blasius M. D'Souza (22 February 1938 – 26 January 2008) was an Indian politician from Mangalore. A member of the Indian National Congress from Mangalore City, he was a minister in the Karnataka state government.

== Biography ==
Blasius D'Souza was the son of AR D'Souza, a prominent businessman in Mangalore. He studied at St. Aloysius College, Mangalore, from where he graduated with a B.Com. degree in 1959. At St. Aloysius, he was president of the College Students' Union and also a member of the hockey team. He earned his L.L.B. from Siddhartha Law College, Mumbai, in 1961. He had two sons and three daughters: Anoop, Rohit, Sonia, Reema, and Rovena. He hailed from the Mangalorean Catholic community.

== Political career ==
Blasius D'Souza entered politics as a Mangalore City Council member in 1962 from Congress Party, where he served for 17 years. From 1972-79, he was the Council President. He served as a District Chairman of Congress Committee in Dakshina Kannada district. He was a Member of Legislative Council in Karnataka Legislature from 1980 to 1985 and represented Mangalore City as a Member of Legislative Assembly for nine years.

In July 1991, he was appointed Law Minister of Karnataka in the Veerappa Moily government. He cleared an average of 25,00 files a month and created a record during his tenure as a minister. In November 1992, he was appointed Minister for Labour in a Cabinet Reshuffle, a position in which he served until 1994.

== Death ==
D'Souza died at the KMC hospital in Mangalore on 26 January 2008, aged 69.

== Positions held ==
- Member of Legislative Council
- Member of Legislative Assembly
- Minister for Law
- Minister for Labour
- Member, Indian National Congress.
- President Students Union St. Aloysius College, Mangalore.
- Chairman, City Central Library, Mangalore.
- Senate Member, Mangalore University.
- Member, Karnataka Telecommunication Advisory Board.
- Vice-Chairman, Hind Kuhst Nivarana Sangha Mangalore.
- Chairman Board of Visitors Govt. Venlock Hospital, Mangalore.
- Member, Board of Visitors Lady Goschan Hospital, Mangalore.
- Member, Mangalore Port Trust, New Mangalore
- Member, Karnataka Administrative Reforms Commission.
- Member, Karnataka State Town and Country Planning Board, Bangalore.
- Member, Planning Authority, Mangalore.
- Founder, Patron Mangalore Wildlife Trust.
- Founder-Chairman Millions of Tree Club, Mangalore.
- Member, World Forestry Day Committee, New Delhi.
- Member, Karnataka State Board for prevention and Control of Water Pollution, Bangalore.
- Vice-Chairman, D.K. District Tuberculosis Assn. Mangalore.
- Member Governing Council, Fr. Muller's Charitable Institution, Mangalore.
- Founder President Mangalore Auto Rickshaw and Car Operators Co-operative Society, Mangalore.
- Executive Committee Member KPCC (I) from 1979 to 1982.
- President Dakshina Kannada DCC(I) from 1979 to 1992, 2001
- Member Organisation Election Committee for Orissa State 1999.
- Chairman, Membership Books Committee for Membership drive of the party in Karnataka 1999.
- Observer Goa Legislative Assembly Election 1999.
- Vice-President, Karnataka Pradesh Congress Committee (I) since 1998.
- Chairman, Pradesh Election Authority for Goa.
- Councillor Mangalore City Municipal Council 1962 to 1979
- President Mangalore City Municipal Council 1972 to 1979.
- President, Dakshina Kannada Hockey Association.
- Member Governing Board Fr. Muller's Hospital, Mangalore.
- Member, Governing Board St. Joseph's Engineering College, Mangalore.
- Chairman, Cheshire homes India, Mangalore Unit.
- Member, KPCC (I) and AICC (I).
- Member, Library Committee
- Member, Public Undertaking Committee
- Member, House Committee
- Member, SC/ST Committee
- Member, Public Accounts Committee
- Member, Managing Committee, SDM Law College, MG Road, Mangalore
- Deputy Leader of the Indian Delegation to the 81st Session of the International Labour Organisation held at Geneva during June 1994.
