= B. Subbayya Shetty =

Indian politician (1933 or 1934 – 2025)

B. Subbayya Shetty (1933 or 1934 – 10 March 2025) was an Indian politician who was a Minister in the Government of Karnataka. He was also the President of the Karnataka State unit of the Janata Party. He was member of legislative assembly (M.L.A.) of Surathkal constituency in Fifth (24 March 1972 – 31 December 1977) and Sixth (17 March 1978 – 8 June 1983) Karnataka legislative assembly. He was a member of the Indo-Tibetan Border Police force, and president of the Forum for National Integration. He died on 10 March 2025, at the age of 91.

== See also ==
- N. M. Adyanthaya
