= Kumble Sundara Rao =

Indian politician

Kumble Sundara Rao or Kumble Sunder Rao (20 March, 1934 – 30 November, 2022) was an Indian politician and Yakshagana and Tala-Maddale (traditional dance) artist. He was exponent of Thenkuthittu or Thenkatittu style of Yakshagana. He was a native of the Dakshina Kannada district in India. He was the member of Tenth Karnataka Legislative Assembly from Surathkal constituency from 1994 to 1999. He won as Bharatiya Janata Party candidate. He worked as an artist in Surathkal, Dharmasthala and Ira Yakshagana melas (Yakshagana troupes). He was awarded Yakshamangala award from P Dayananda Pai and P Satish Pai Yakshagana Adhyayana Kendra at Mangalore University for the year 2018–2019. He also served as president of Karnataka state Yakshagana academy.
