= J. Krishna Palemar =

Indian politician

Cabinet Minister Government of Karnataka
- In office 7 June 2008 – 9 February 2012
- Ministry: Term
- Minister of Ports & Inland Transport: 7 June 2008 - 9 February 2012
- Minister of Fisheries: 7 June 2008 - 22 September 2010
- Minister of Hindu Religious Organizations & Endowments: 22 September 2010 - 9 February 2012
- Minister of Ecology & Environment: 22 September 2010 - 9 February 2012

Member of Karnataka Legislative Assembly
- In office 2008–2013
- Preceded by: Constituency created
- Succeeded by: Mohiuddin Bava
- Constituency: Mangalore City North
- In office 2004–2008
- Preceded by: Vijaya Kumar Shetty
- Succeeded by: Constituency ceased to exist
- Constituency: Surathkal

Personal details
- Born: Mangalore, Karnataka
- Party: Bharatiya Janata party

J. Krishna Palemar is a former member of the Karnataka Legislative Assembly from Mangalore City North (and erstwhile Surathkal) and a member of the Bhartiya Janata Party, who had served as Minister of Environment and Ports in the B. S. Yeddyurappa government and as Minister for Ports, Science and Technology in the D. V. Sadananda Gowda Government. He is a realtor, builder, businessman, and educationist.

He resigned as a Minister on 8 February 2012, during the Video clip controversy, when he was caught on camera viewing a pornographic video clip on a mobile device.

== Member of Legislative Assembly ==
He was elected as Member of Legislative Assembly in the following years.

- 2004
- 2008

== Positions held ==
- Minister for Fisheries, Ports and Inland Water Transport; Small Savings and Lotteries
- Minister for Ports, Science and Technology
- District-in-charge Minister for Dakshina Kannada and Madikeri
