= Badaje =

- Village
- Location in Kerala, India Badaje (India)
- Coordinates: 12°43′36″N 74°54′27″E
- Country: India
- State: Kerala
- District: Kasaragod

Population (2011)
  - Total: 8,170

Languages
  - Official: Malayalam, English
- Time zone: UTC+5:30 (IST)
- PIN: 671323
- Telephone code: 4998
- Vehicle registration: KL

Badaje is a village in Kasaragod district in the state of Kerala, India. It is a small village in Manjeshwaram Taluk. NH66 which passes through Manjeshwar is 3 kilometres (1.9 mi) away from Badaje.

== History ==
The name Badaje is derived from the name of old ruler of Badaje 'Badja'.

== Transportation ==
Local roads have access to National Highway No.66 which connects to Mangalore in the north and Calicut in the south. The nearest railway station is Manjeshwar on Mangalore-Palakkad line and Mangalore International Airport is the nearest airport.

== Education ==
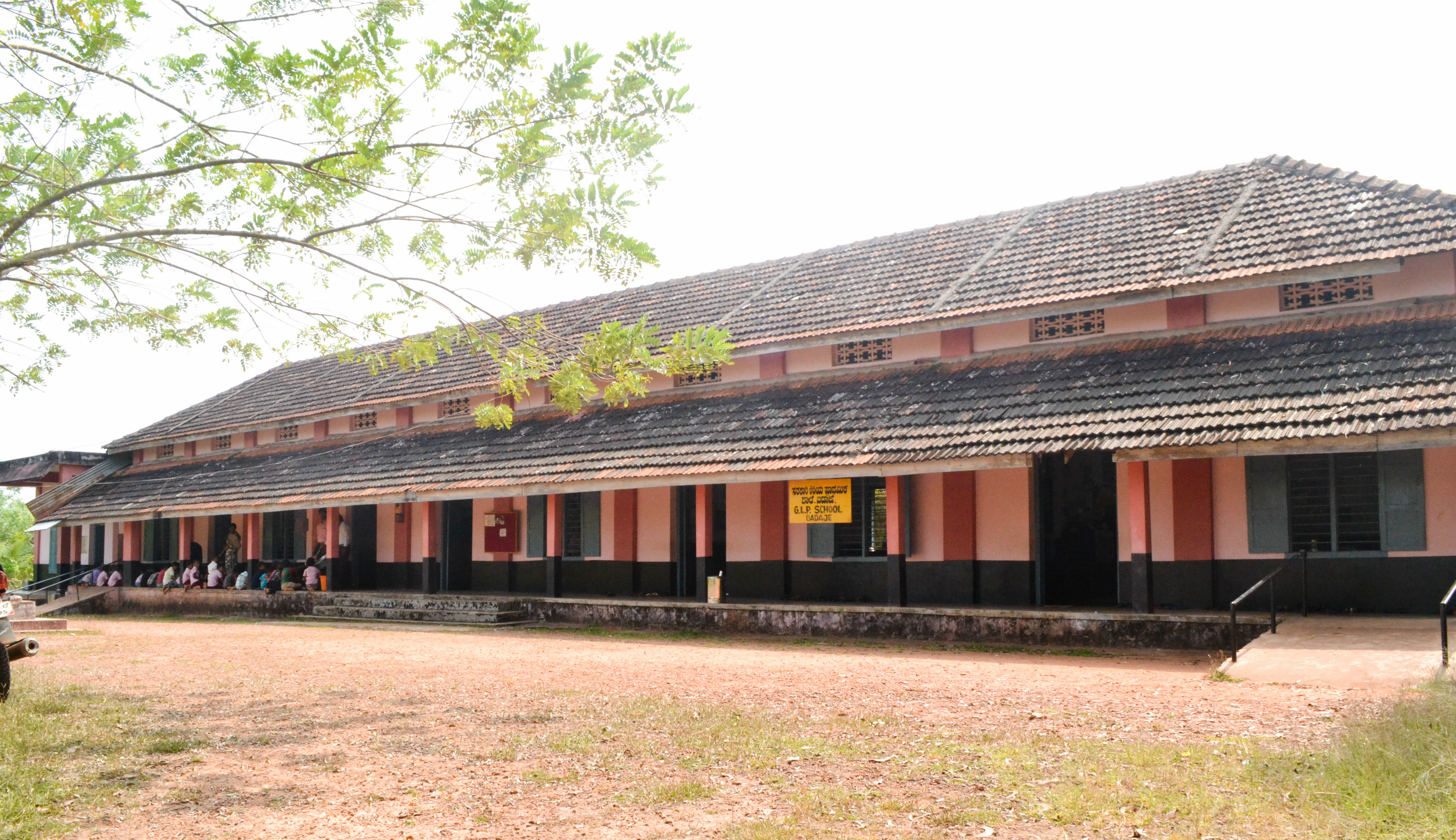
Govt. Lower Primary School, Badaje

- Govt. Lower Primary School, Badaje
- Sphoorthy Vidya Nikethan, Badaje

== Landmarks ==
- Shri Mahalingeshwara Temple

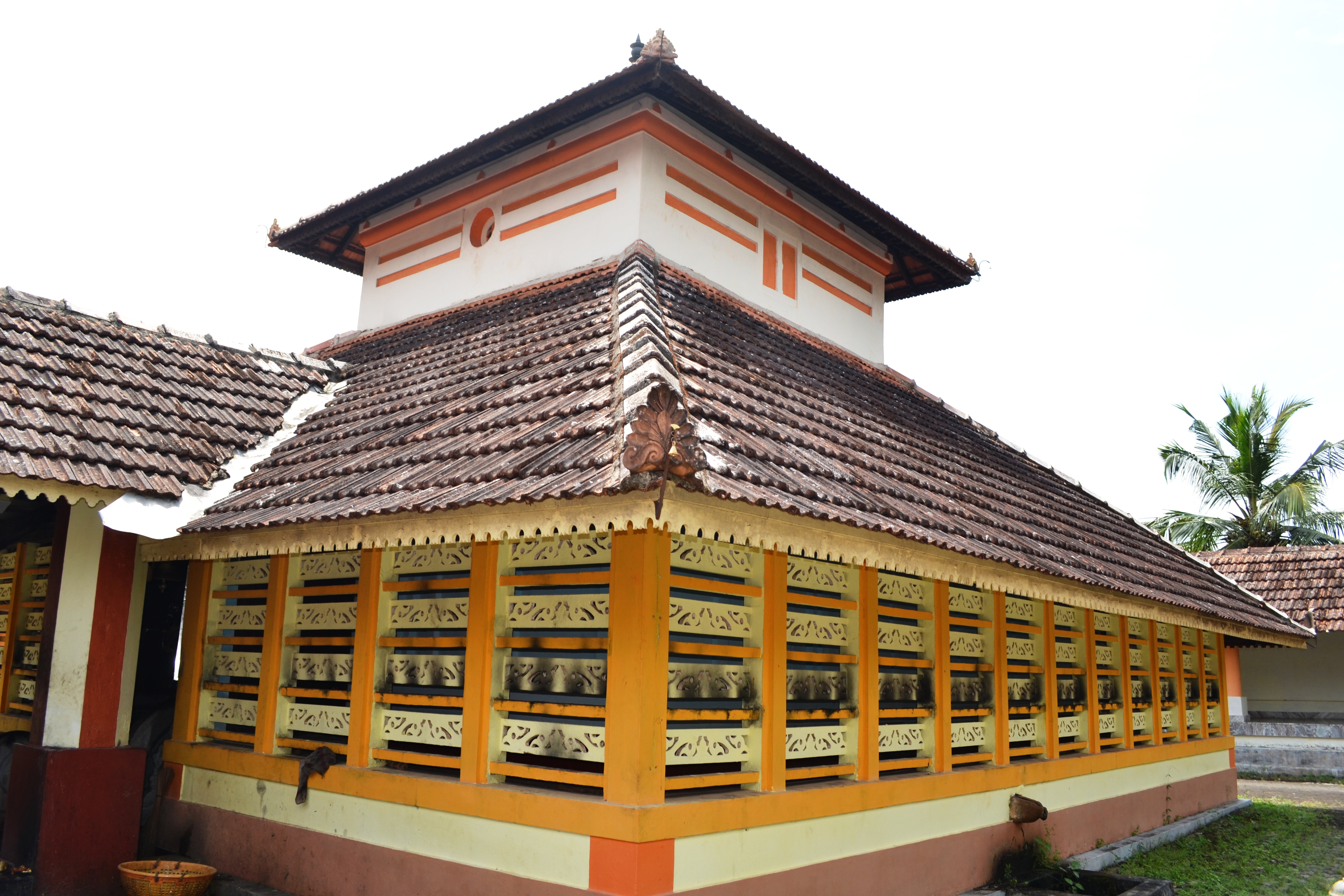
Sri Mahalingeshwara Temple, Badaje

Shri Mahalingeshwara Temple is a very old temple and Lord Shiva is the main deity here. According to the local stories, Shivalinga in this temple was installed by Khara Rakshasa. The festival of the temple is celebrated during the month of January, on the day of Makarasankranti.

- Machampady Juma Masjid

== Demographics ==
As of 2011 India census, Badaje had a population of 8170 with 3981 males and 4189 females.

== Languages ==
This locality is an essentially multi-lingual region. The people speak Tulu, Kannada, Malayalam, Beary bashe and Konkani. Migrant workers also speak Hindi and Tamil languages. This village is part of Manjeshwar (State Assembly constituency) which is under Kasaragod (Lok Sabha constituency).

== See also ==
- Manjeshwar
- Kasaragod
- Pavoor
