= Mohiuddin Bava =

Indian politician

B.A. Mohiuddin Bava

Member of Karnataka Legislative Assembly
- In office 2013–2018
- Preceded by: J. Krishna Palemar
- Succeeded by: Bharath Shetty Y
- Constituency: Mangalore City North

Personal details
- Party: Janata Dal (Secular)
- Other political affiliations: Indian National Congress
- Children: 1
- Parent: B.A. Ahmed Bava
- Relatives: B. M. Farooq (brother)
- Occupation: Politician
- Profession: Businessman

Mohiuddin Bava is an Indian politician from the state of Karnataka. He represented the Mangalore City North seat as a member of the Indian National Congress party in the Karnataka Legislative Assembly from 2013 to 2018.

== Political career ==
Bava was named by the Indian National Congress party as the party candidate of the Mangalore City North seat for the 2013 Karnataka Legislative Assembly election. His Muslim supporters claimed that if he was not given a ticket, then Muslims might vote for other parties. He had previously unsuccessfully contested the seat in the 2008 Assembly election. He won the seat by defeating his nearest rival J. Krishna Palemar of the Bharatiya Janata Party by 5,573 votes.

In June 2017, Bharatiya Janata Party demanded action against Bava for distributing notebooks to students in his constituency which had picture of Bava printed on it. The president of the party's Mangalore north unit accused him of misusing political power.

== Positions held ==
#	From	To	Position	Party
1	2013	2018	MLA (1st Term) from Mangalore City North seat	Indian National Congress

== Personal life ==
Bava is the oldest son of late Ahmed Bava. Bava is the brother of businessman B M Farooq. Farooq was made a candidate of the Janata Dal (Secular) party for the Rajya Sabha elections. However, Bava said that it was his brother's decision and he has his own priorities and opinion and had not promoted any family member to join any other party. Chief Minister Siddaramaiah warned him for failing to prevent his brother from contesting election on a Janata Dal (Secular) ticket. However, he was supported by Karnataka Pradesh Congress Committee President G. Parameshwara and said that Farooq had the right to take decisions.

In February 2016, Bava was injured and his shoulder was fractured in a road accident. This occurred in Panambur as his car fell into a ditch, while he was on his way to the airport.

Bava is also the first Indian to own a Volvo XC90.

== Controversy ==
- B A Mohiuddin Bava distributed 3.08 lakh books with his pictures on 13 June 2013.
- Mangalore South MLA Mr.Vedavyas Kamath (BJP) pressurized Mohiuddin Bava to withdraw case against son of former mayor, who assaulted Bava publicly. The attack took place when Bava went to pacify former mayor for not being issued ticket from congress to contest the election to the council of Mangalore City Corporation from Katipalla ward.
