= Nalin Kumar Kateel =

Indian politician (born 1966)

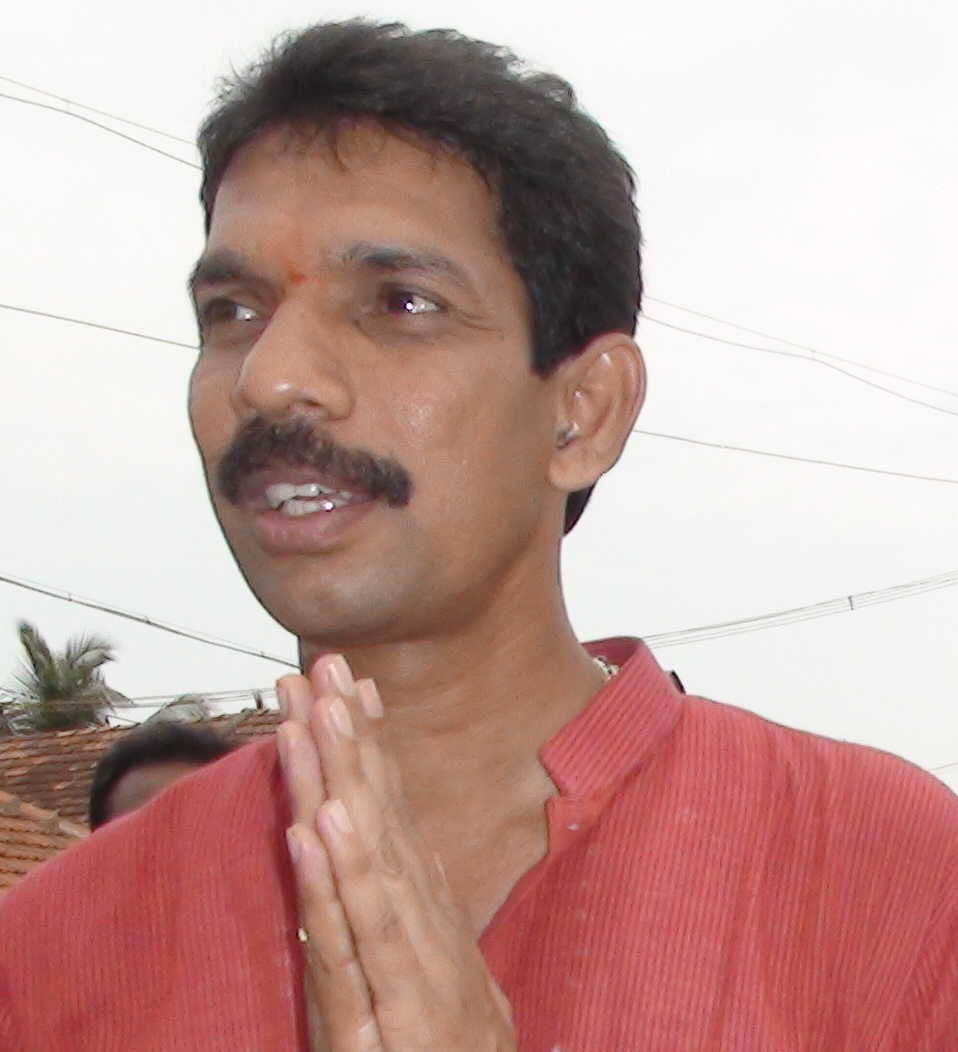

President of Bharatiya Janata Party, Karnataka
- In office 20 August 2019 – 10 November 2023
- Preceded by: B. S. Yeddyurappa
- Succeeded by: B. Y. Vijayendra

Member of Parliament, Lok Sabha
- In office 16 May 2009 – 4 June 2024
- Preceded by: Constituency created
- Succeeded by: Brijesh Chowta
- Constituency: Dakshina Kannada

Personal details
- Born: 7 December 1966 (age 59) Mangaluru, Mysore State, India
- Party: Bharatiya Janata Party
- Spouse: Sridevi
- Children: 2

Nalin Niranjan Shetty Kateel (born 7 December 1966) is an Indian politician who was the 9th State President of Bharatiya Janata Party of Karnataka from 20 August 2019 till 10 November 2023 and Member of Parliament from Dakshina Kannada constituency from 2009-2024.

== Political career ==
Nalin Kumar Kateel started his social and political career when he became a Pracharak (full-time member) of Rashtriya Swayamsevak Sangh (RSS), a Hindu Nationalist organisation at the age of 18 and worked so for a period of 12 years. He was educated at St. Philomena's High School, Puttur. After his father's death, he took over the responsibility of managing his family affairs, agriculture, and also started his professional career as a civil contractor. Later he joined the Bharatiya Janta Party and rising through the ranks became District General Secretary of the party in the year 2004. In the year 2009 he was elected to the Lok Sabha, the lower house of India's Parliament. He was re-elected as MP in the 2014 elections for the second term.

On 20 August 2019, he was appointed the state unit president of the Karnataka BJP to replace B. S. Yediyurappa who had become the Chief Minister.

As Member of Parliament Nalin Kumar Kateel has participated in 45 debates and raised 687 questions.

The BJP denied him a ticket fielding Brijesh Chowta as candidate in forthcoming elections of 2024.

== Controversies ==
- On 14 February 2023, he said that Tipu Sultan supporters should leave the state, and also said that Ram and Hanuman worshippers should live in the state. Earlier, he asked people to focus on Love Jihad rather than on roads and infrastructure.
- On 5 August 2019, a Bengaluru court issued an arrest warrant against him for an inflammatory speech. On 3 June 2017, Kateel had made a provocative speech in a protest held in front of Konaje police (under Mangaluru city police) station.
- On 14 May 2014 Sathish Shetty, a resident of Beverly Park, Thane logged an FIR against Nalin Kumar accusing him of having "an illicit relationship with his wife Vinutha". Nalin Kumar Kateel denied the allegations saying it is a political conspiracy to damage his image politically. A FIR was registered in Mangaluru City police station.
- BJP Yuva Morcha expressed anger towards the inefficiency of the MP towards development work and also towards inaction of the police investigation in the death of the Yuva morcha leader and gheraoed and pushed his car almost endangering his life. However, his team later floated that there is a conspiracy to malign his image hence the anger of BJP workers was purposely created, they said in a media briefing.

== Position held ==
2009	Elected to 15th Lok Sabha
31 August 2009	Member, Standing Committee on Commerce.
May 2014	Re-elected to 16th Lok Sabha (2nd term)
4 August 2014 – 30 April 2015	Member, Committee on Estimates
1 September 2014 – 25 May 2019	Member, Standing Committee on Agriculture Member, Consultative Committee, Ministry of Home Affairs.
May 2019	Re-elected to 17th Lok Sabha (3rd term)
13 September 2019 onwards	Member, Standing Committee on Rural Development.
9 October 2019 onwards	Member, Committee on Government Assurances Member, Consultative Committee, Ministry of Shipping
