= St. Gerosa High School, Mangaluru =

Girls school in Mangalore city of Karnataka state in India

St. Gerosa High School
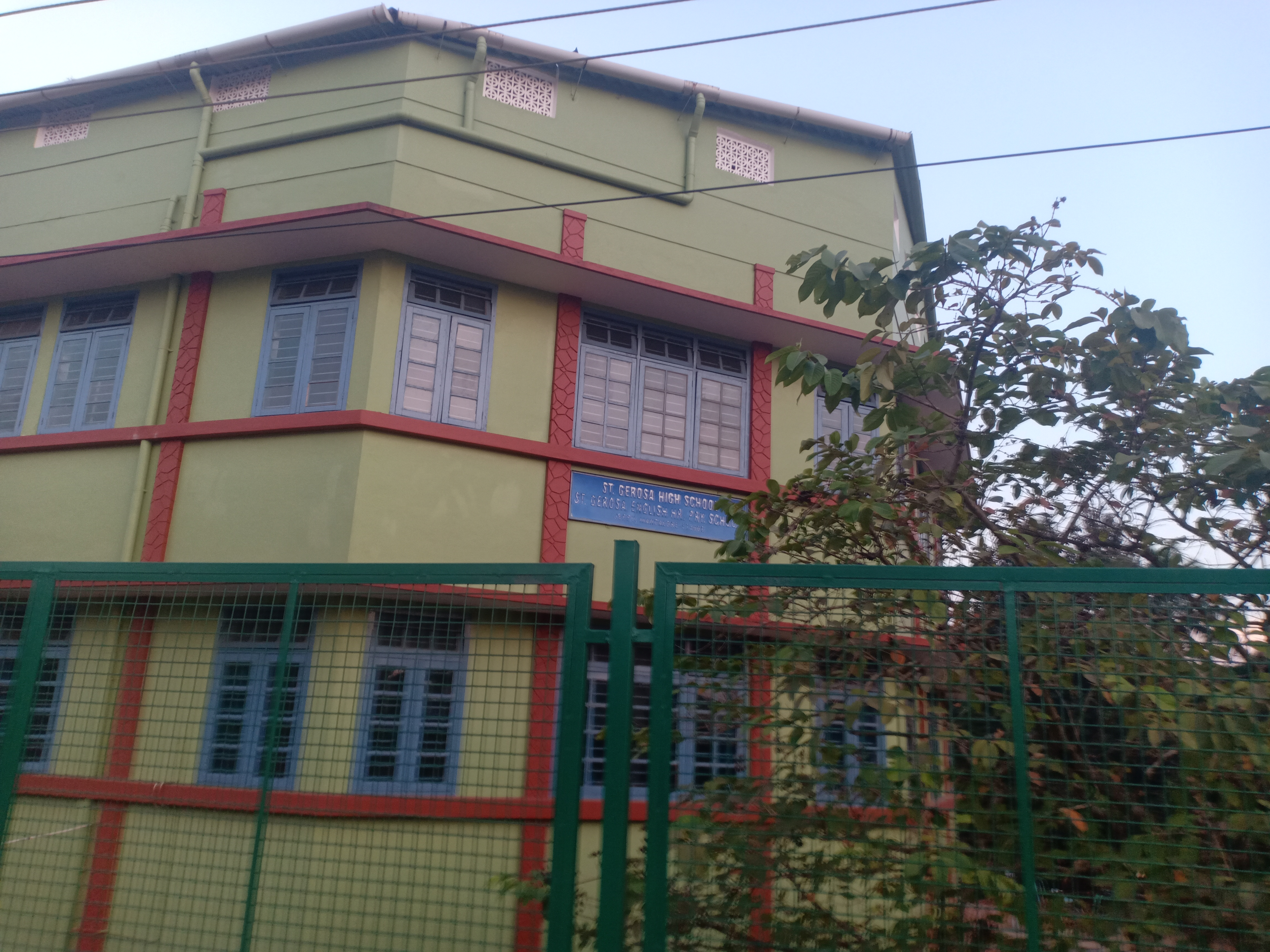
- Near the entrance of St. Gerosa High School in Mangaluru

Location
- Mangaluru, Karnataka; India; 12.853815°N 74.836424°E

Information
- Established: 1964

Saint Gerosa High School is a Catholic girls school in Mangaluru city of Karnataka state in India. It is situated in the Jeppu locality of Mangalore. This school is managed by the Sisters of Charity.

== History ==
This school was opened in 1964 when 84 students were enrolled for 8th standard in Kannada medium, and in subsequent years for 9th and 10th standard students. The first batch of SSLC students appeared for the public examination in March 1967. In the year 1972, the first batch of English medium girls who had passed their 7th Std. District level Examination, enrolled themselves in the High School, adding a parallel English medium section to the existing aided Kannada medium High School.

== Notable alumni ==
Actress Neethu Shetty who has won a state award for best actress and starred as the main lead in movies such as Gaalipata and Poojari.

== Controversy ==
MLA Vedavyas Kamath and MLA Bharat Shetty from the BJP lobbied for parents to avoid the christian missionary schools after a controversy, he alleged that a teacher made derogatory remarks about the Hindu deity Ram inside the classroom.

== See also ==
- Sisters of Charity of Saints Bartolomea Capitanio and Vincenza Gerosa
- Catholic school
- Single-sex education
- Education in Karnataka
