= John Richard Lobo =

Indian politician

Member of the Karnataka Legislative Assembly
- In office 2013–2018
- Constituency: Mangalore City South

Personal details
- Born: 26 March 1953 (age 71); Kolambe Village, Mangalore taluk, Karnataka
- Political party: Indian National Congress

John Richard Lobo, popularly known as J. R. Lobo, is an Indian politician with the Indian National Congress and former MLA of Mangalore South constituency in Karnataka, India. MLA J.R. Lobo proposed the installation of musical fountain with laser show at Kadri Park, which is the largest lung space in the city. J.R. Lobo also proposed the construction of the 3D 8K Planetarium at Pilikula in Mangalore, which was inaugurated in March 2018.

J.R. Lobo worked for 18 years as the founding Executive Director of the Pilikula Nisargadhama in Mangalore. Time and again he has brought up the work of how Mangalore City Corporation has neglected the development work and put the people of Mangalore in discomfort.

Lobo alleged that he lost the 2018 assembly elections due to the electronic voting machines being manipulated.

J. R. Lobo contested once again in May 2023, but lost.

== Activism ==
J. R. Lobo slammed the Government of Karnataka and the then Chief Minister Bommai for a casual approach where murders are being committed in the region. The Coastal Karnataka belt has witnessed three serial murders and there have been restrictions due to it.

He demanded action to be taken against MLA Vedavyas and Bharat for behaving in an uncivilized way during Gerosa School protest.

== Controversy ==
Lobo is Managing director of a Mushroom Factory where locals created a stir citing foul smell of mushroom, the same was resolved over time.
