= Brijesh Chowta =

Indian politician and Ex Captain of Indian Army

Captain Brijesh Chowta

Member of Parliament, Lok Sabha
- Incumbent
- Assumed office 4 June 2024
- Preceded by: Nalin Kumar Kateel
- Constituency: Dakshina Kannada

Personal details
- Born: 31 August 1981 (age 45) Mangaluru, Karnataka, India
- Party: Bharatiya Janata Party
- Parent(s): Sesanna Chowta, Pushpa Chowta
- Education: St Aloysius College; Officers Training Academy; Indian Institute of Management Indore
- Profession: Politician

Captain Brijesh Chowta is an Indian politician and the Member of Parliament, Lok Sabha from Dakshina Kannada Lok Sabha constituency. He is a Member of Parliament from Bharatiya Janata Party assumed office on 4 June 2024.

He has been serving as the secretary of the Bharatiya Janata Party, Karnataka since December 2023.

Born and raised in Mangaluru, Chowta graduated from St.Aloysius College, Mangaluru in 2002 with a Bachelor of Science.

After passing out from the Officer Training Academy, he was commissioned into the 7th Battalion of 8th Gorkha Rifles. And served in the Indian army from 2003 to 2010. During this stint, Chowta served in the counter-insurgency operations in Manipur and Assam respectively.

He then returned to Mangaluru and began his entrepreneurial and political journey joining the BJP in 2013.

== Early life and education ==
Captain Brijesh Chowta was born to Sesanna Chowta, now a retired agriculturist and Pushpa Chowta, a homemaker in Mangaluru. He completed his schooling at Milagres School and went on to complete his Pre-university college and bachelor's degree from St. Aloysius College, Mangaluru. It is his association with the National Cadet Corps(NCC) as part of which he also attended the Republic Day Parade in New Delhi that nudged him to join the Indian Army.

Post his stint in the army, he pursued the Executive Business Management program at the Indian Institute of Management (IIM) Indore.

Army Days

Captain Brijesh Chowta appeared for the CDS examination and joined the OTA Chennai and went on to be commissioned into 7th Battalion of the 8th Gorkha Rifles, where he served until 2010. From 2003 to 2010, he served in various regions across the North and North Eastern parts of India and was part of Counter Insurgency Operations in Assam and Manipur. Having undergone jungle warfare and counter-insurgency training from CIJW School, Vairengte, Mizoram and Commando training at Infantry School, Belgaum he was also part of the elite Ghatak team, and served as an Adjutant to his battalion.

== Political career ==
In the 2024 Indian general election, Brijesh Chowta won from Dakshina Kannada Lok Sabha constituency seat by defeating Padmaraj R Poojari (INC) by a margin of 1,49,208 votes.

Captain Brijesh Chowta completed his short service commission and returned to Mangaluru and joined the Bharatiya Janata party and served as the District General Secretary of Yuva Morcha from 2013 - 2016, District BJP General Secretary, the Dakshina Kannada from 2016 to 2019 and Member of the BJP District Executive Committee Member from 2019 to 2023.

In the last decade, he has also been deputed by the party on election duty in various states like Karnataka (2013, 2018), Maharashtra (2014), Kerala (2016) and the parliamentary election (2014, 2019). In 2023, he was appointed the State Co-Convenor for Yuva Samvada.

During the 2023 Karnataka state elections, Captain Brijesh Chowta was the election in-charge for Byndoor constituency.

Since December 2023, when he was appointed, he serves as secretary of the Bharatiya Janata Party (BJP) Karnataka state unit.

He was chosen as the BJP candidate by the BJP to represent Dakshina Kannada Loksabha constituency replacing incumbent Nalin Kumar Kateel.

In the recently concluded Loksabha elections of 2024, he won with a margin of 1,49,208 votes securing 7,64,132 (53.97%) votes.

== Service and social responsibilities ==
Captain Brijesh Chowta is the President of Mangaluru Kambala which for the last 7 years has been conducting the rural folk sport of Kambala in Mangalore.

It was started as he led a team of young minds during the agitation against PETA's efforts to ban the traditional folk sport Kambala. This gained momentum and turned into Mangaluru Kambala which is entirely managed by a volunteer team, and has become an important event in the cultural calendar of coastal Karnataka.

He also has been a founding trustee of the Bharat Foundation which conducts the Mangaluru Litfest – an annual two-day thought festival in Mangaluru since 2019.

As a Founder Trustee of Samarthan Foundation, he has involved himself in various charitable and philanthropic activities across Dakshina Kannada.

== See also ==
- 18th Lok Sabha
- Bharatiya Janata Party
- Government of India
