= Mangalore Lok Sabha constituency =

Constituency of the Indian parliament in Karnataka

Coordinates: 12.9°N 74.8°E

Mangalore
- Former Lok Sabha constituency

Constituency details
- Country: India
- Region: South India
- State: Karnataka
- Established: 1957
- Abolished: 2008
- Reservation: None

Mangalore Lok Sabha constituency was one of the Lok Sabha constituencies in Karnataka state in southern India. With the implementation of the delimitation of parliamentary constituencies in 2008, based on the recommendations of the Delimitation Commission of India constituted in 2002, this constituency ceased to exist.

== Assembly segments ==
After the delimitation (2008), Dakshina Kannada Lok Sabha constituency replaced the Mangalore Lok Sabha constituency. As of 2019 Dakshina Kannada Lok Sabha constituency comprises the following Legislative Assembly segments:

1. Mangalore City North
2. Mangalore City South
3. Mangalore (Ullal)
4. Sullia
5. Puttur
6. Bantval
7. Moodabidri
8. Belthangady

=== Before 2008 delimitation ===
Before the delimitation (2008), Mangalore Lok Sabha constituency comprised the following Legislative Assembly segments.

1. Virajpet
2. Madikeri
3. Somwarpet
4. Sullia
5. Puttur
6. Vittal
7. Mangalore (Mangalore City South)
8. Ullal (Mangalore)

=== Arrangement in 1950s ===
Mangalore Lok Sabha Constituency was a part of South Kanara (South) Lok Sabha constituency of Madras State. That seat came into existence in 1951 when South Kanara District (comprising present Dakshina Kannada District of Karnataka and Kasargod, Kanhangad Taluks of Kerala). With the implementation of States Reorganisation Act, 1956, it ceased to exist.

South Kanara (South) Lok Sabha constituency comprised the following six Legislative Assembly segments: 1) Panamangalore (Panemangalore), 2) Mangalore, 3) Kasargod, 4) Hosdurg (Kanhangad), 5 and 6) Two Puttur seats

After South Kanara District of erstwhile Madras State got merged with Mysore State in 1956, South Kanara (South) Lok Sabha constituency ceased to exist and was replaced by Mangalore Lok Sabha constituency. The Parts of Kasargod and Hosdurg (Kanhangad) were merged with Kerala and became a part of Kasaragod Lok Sabha constituency.

== Members of Parliament ==
Year	Member	Party
1952: See South Canara (South)
1957	K. R. Achar	Indian National Congress
1962	A. Shanker Alva	Indian National Congress
1967	C. M. Poonacha	Indian National Congress
1971	K. K. Shetty	Indian National Congress
1977	Janardhana Poojary	Indian National Congress
1980	Janardhana Poojary	Indian National Congress
1984	Janardhana Poojary	Indian National Congress
1989	Janardhana Poojary	Indian National Congress
1991	V. Dhananjay Kumar	Bharatiya Janata Party
1996	V. Dhananjay Kumar	Bharatiya Janata Party
1998	V. Dhananjay Kumar	Bharatiya Janata Party
1999	V. Dhananjay Kumar	Bharatiya Janata Party
2004	Sadananda Gowda	Bharatiya Janata Party
2008 onwards : See Dakshina Kannada

== Election results ==
=== 2004 ===
2004 Indian general election: Mangalore
Party	Candidate	Votes	%	±%
BJP	D. V. Sadananda Gowda	384,760	48.60	−0.53
INC	M. Veerappa Moily	3,51,345	44.38	−3.57
JD(S)	A. K. Subbaiah	39,774	5.02	+2.10
Kannada Nadu Party	Rohit Kumar Joshi	15,693	1.98	+1.98
Majority		33,415	4.22	+3.04
Turnout		7,91,572	71.86	+0.08
BJP hold		Swing	-0.53	

== See also ==
- Dakshina Kannada Lok Sabha constituency
- South Kanara (South) Lok Sabha constituency
- Kodagu district
- List of former constituencies of the Lok Sabha
