= Y. Bharath Shetty =

Indian politician

Bharath Shetty Y

Member of Karnataka Legislative Assembly
- Incumbent
- Assumed office 2018
- Preceded by: B.A. Mohiuddin Bava
- Constituency: Mangalore City North

Personal details
- Born: 8 September 1971 (age 55) Mangalore, Karnataka, India
- Party: Bharatiya Janata Party
- Spouse: Asavari Shetty
- Education: Rajiv Gandhi University of Health Sciences
- Website: drbharathshetty.in

Bharath Shetty Y is an Indian dentist and politician. Shetty serves on the Karnataka Legislative Assembly, representing the Mangalore City North constituency. Shetty is a member of the BJP.

== Controversy ==
Bharath was given anticipatory bail in a school unrest he created along with his colleague Vedavyas Kamath on the charges of inciting disagreement between people. The incident happened outside Gerosa School.
