= N. M. Adyanthaya =

Indian politician

Member of Legislative Assembly of Karnataka
- Constituency: Surathkal

Personal details
- Party: Indian National Congress

Nitte Manjappa Adyanthaya is an Indian politician and trade union leader affiliated with the Indian National Congress.

== Biography ==
Adyanthaya entered politics when he joined the Indian National Congress. He was elected to the Karnataka Legislative Assembly from the Surathkal constituency in 1985. He has also been actively involved in Trade union and labour right activism. Currently he is a Member of the Governing Body of the International Labour Organization, Member of India-Europe Civil Society, Spokesperson of Worker's Group, International Programme on the Elimination of Child Labour, Vice President – Indian National Trade Union Congress (National), Trustee – New Mangalore Post Trust and President of the Indian National Trade Union Congress (Karnataka State).

== See also ==
- B. Subbayya Shetty
