= N. Yogish Bhat =

Indian politician

N. Yogish Bhat is a leader of Bharatiya Janata Party from Karnataka. He is a former member of the Karnataka Legislative Assembly elected from Mangalore City South and (erstwhile Mangalore City). Bhat has served as deputy speaker of the assembly .

== Member of Legislative Assembly ==
He was elected as Member of Legislative Assembly in the following years.

- 2008
- 2004
- 1999
- 1994

== Positions held ==
- Deputy speaker of the Legislative assembly
