= A. Shanker Alva =

Indian politician and lawyer

Adhur Shanker Alva

Member of Parliament
- In office 1962–1967
- Preceded by: K. R. Achar
- Succeeded by: Cheppudira Muthana Poonacha
- Constituency: Mangalore

Personal details
- Born: 22 April 1906 Adhur, Kasaragod Taluka, Madras Presidency
- Died: 1977 Bangalore
- Party: Indian National Congress
- Spouse: Sanjeeva
- Children: Somashekar Alva, Vajra, Veda Shetty, Hema Hegde

Adhur Shanker Alva (22 April 1906 – 1977) was an Indian politician, lawyer and Member of Parliament who represented the Mangalore Constituency in the 3rd Lok Sabha. He was a member of Indian National Congress.

== Biography ==
Alva was born in an affluent Tulu speaking Bunt family of landlords. He belonged to Adkathabail family of Kasaragod. He completed his education at St. Aloysius College (Mangalore) and Madras Law College earning the degrees of B.A. and L.L.B. A widower through much of his life, he raised four children as a single parent. Apart from being a politician he was a lawyer practicing in Mangalore and was a member of various social, cultural and sporting organizations. He contested and won Assembly election from Puttur Dakshina Kannada and became Cabinet Minister for Co-operation when Devaraj Urs was the CM.

== Position Held ==
Position Held
Municipal Councillor	Mangalore Municipality
Member	Madras University Senate
Secretary	Mangalore Bar Association
Member	Mysore Pradesh Congress Committee
President	Mangalore Taluk Congress Committee
Member	South Canara district sports council
Treasurer and Founder member	South Kanara Cricket Association
President	South kanara cashew and coffee workers union
