= Mangalore City North Assembly constituency =

Constituency of the Karnataka legislative assembly in India

Coordinates: 12.97°N 74.83°E

Mangalore City North
- Constituency No. 202 for the Karnataka Legislative Assembly

Constituency details
- Country: India
- Region: South India
- State: Karnataka
- District: Dakshina Kannada
- Established: 2008
- Total electors: 249,464 (2023)
- Reservation: None

Member of Legislative Assembly
- 16th Karnataka Legislative Assembly
- Incumbent Y. Bharath Shetty
- Party: Bharatiya Janata Party
- Elected year: 2023
- Preceded by: Mohiuddin Bava

Mangalore City North Assembly constituency is one of the Karnataka Legislative Assemblies or Vidhan Sabha constituencies in Karnataka. Mangalore City North is part of Dakshina Kannada Lok Sabha constituency along with seven other Vidhan Sabha segments, namely: 201. Moodabidri, 203. Mangalore City South, 204. Mangalore, 205. Bantwal, 206. Puttur and 207. Sullia.

== History ==
During the 2007 delimitation exercise conducted by Election Commission of India, several villages from Moodabidri, Bantval constituency and many villages from Surathkal were included to form Mangalore City North constituency. It is a part of Dakshina Kannada (Lok Sabha constituency) since Lok Sabha Elections 2009.

== Members of the Legislative Assembly ==
| Election | Member | Party |
|---|---|---|
| 2008 | J. Krishna Palemar | Bharatiya Janata Party |
| 2013 | Mohiuddin Bava | Indian National Congress |
| 2018 | Dr. Y. Bharath Shetty | Bharatiya Janata Party |
| 2023 | Dr. Y. Bharath Shetty | Bharatiya Janata Party |

== Election results ==
=== Assembly Election 2023 ===
2023 Karnataka Legislative Assembly election : Mangalore City North
| Party | Candidate | Votes | % | ±% |
|---|---|---|---|---|
| BJP | Dr. Y. Bharath Shetty | 103,531 | 56.77 | ▲0.75 |
| INC | Inayath Ali | 70,609 | 38.72 | ▼2.16 |
| JD(S) | Mohiuddin Bava | 5,256 | 2.88 | New |
| NOTA | None of the above | 1,194 | 0.65 | ▼0.01 |
| Margin of victory | | 32,922 | 18.05 | ▲2.92 |
| Turnout | | 183,007 | 73.36 | ▼1.73 |
| Total valid votes | | 182,363 | | |
| Registered electors | | 249,464 | | ▲6.22 |
| BJP hold | | Swing | ▲0.75 | |

=== Assembly Election 2018 ===
2018 Karnataka Legislative Assembly election : Mangalore City North
| Party | Candidate | Votes | % | ±% |
|---|---|---|---|---|
| BJP | Dr. Y. Bharath Shetty | 98,648 | 56.02 | ▲7.25 |
| INC | Mohiuddin Bava | 72,000 | 40.88 | ▼11.95 |
| CPI(M) | Muneer Katipalla | 2,472 | 1.40 | New |
| NOTA | None of the above | 1,166 | 0.66 | New |
| Margin of victory | | 26,648 | 15.13 | ▲11.07 |
| Turnout | | 176,362 | 75.09 | ▲3.59 |
| Total valid votes | | 176,104 | | |
| Registered electors | | 234,856 | | ▲14.89 |
| BJP gain from INC | | Swing | ▲3.19 | |

=== Assembly Election 2013 ===
2013 Karnataka Legislative Assembly election : Mangalore City North
| Party | Candidate | Votes | % | ±% |
|---|---|---|---|---|
| INC | Mohiuddin Bava | 69,897 | 52.83 | ▲10.67 |
| BJP | J. Krishna Palemar | 64,524 | 48.77 | ▼4.33 |
| SDPI | Aboobakkar | 3,323 | 2.51 | New |
| KJP | Ramachandra Baikampady | 2,104 | 1.59 | New |
| JD(S) | Gulam Mohammed | 1,808 | 1.37 | ▼0.56 |
| Independent | H. Vinaya Acharya | 1,536 | 1.16 | New |
| NCP | Supreeth Kumar Poojary | 1,136 | 0.86 | New |
| Independent | Maxim Pinto | 878 | 0.66 | New |
| Margin of victory | | 5,373 | 4.06 | ▼6.87 |
| Turnout | | 146,165 | 71.50 | ▼0.68 |
| Total valid votes | | 132,315 | | |
| Registered electors | | 204,413 | | ▲11.80 |
| INC gain from BJP | | Swing | ▼0.27 | |

=== Assembly Election 2008 ===
2008 Karnataka Legislative Assembly election : Mangalore City North
| Party | Candidate | Votes | % | ±% |
|---|---|---|---|---|
| BJP | J. Krishna Palemar | 70,057 | 53.10 | New |
| INC | Mohiuddin Bava | 55,631 | 42.16 | New |
| JD(S) | Amin. S. V | 2,542 | 1.93 | New |
| Independent | Ananda Gatty | 1,642 | 1.24 | New |
| BSP | Shashikala. M | 1,322 | 1.00 | New |
| Margin of victory | | 14,426 | 10.93 | |
| Turnout | | 131,978 | 72.18 | |
| Total valid votes | | 131,939 | | |
| Registered electors | | 182,840 | | |
| BJP win (new seat) | | | | |
