= Basel Evangelical School, Mangaluru =

Basel Evangelical School
- BEM School

Location
- Mangaluru, Karnataka; India
- Coordinates: 12.856721°N 74.836423°E

Information
- Motto: Heavens Light Our Guide
- Founded: 1838; 188 years ago
- Website: www.bemschool.org

Basel Evangelical School, or BEM School, is a school in Car Street in Mangaluru city in the state of Karnataka in India. It was established in the year 1838 by the Basel Evangelical Mission. K. S. Hegde and Kayyar Kinhanna Rai have studied in this institution.

== History ==
Basel Evangelical School is one of the oldest educational institutes in South India, and in the year 2013, it had 480 students, from lower primary to the pre-university classes. Established in 1838 by German Christian missionaries, the high school section was added in 1888. It received permanent recognition from the Madras government in 1940. Since 1959, the school is managed by South Kanara Educational and Cultural Society. Ferdinand Kittel, who composed the Kannada-English dictionary, taught here.
