= Pavoor =

- Village
- Location in Kerala, India Pavoor (India)
- Coordinates: 12.74866°N 74.92970°E
- Country: India
- State: Kerala
- District: Kasaragod

Population (2011)
  - Total: 5,987

Languages
  - Official: Malayalam, English
- Time zone: UTC+5:30 (IST)
- PIN: 671323
- Telephone code: 4998
- Vehicle registration: KL-14, KL-85
- Nearest city: Manjeshwar
- Literacy: 99%
- Lok Sabha constituency: Kasaragod
- Vidhan Sabha constituency: Manjeshwar
- Website: www.bandasala.blogspot.com

Pavoor is a village in Kasaragod district in the state of Kerala, India.

== Demographics ==
As of 2011 India census, Pavoor had a population of 5987 with 2954 males and 3033 females. Pavoor is a small village located in northern boundary of Kerala in Vorkady panchayath, Manjeshwar, Kasaragod. Both Hindu and Christian houses have this house name in common. Majority of Muslims are living here.

== Education ==
The youth of Pavoor are well educated and literacy rate is more than 90% in this region. There are many educational institutions within a 4 km radius, including:

- ALP Govt School
- Fathima English medium School
- BCP Tuition Centre

BCP Tuition Center is the Institution where tuition is provided from LKG to UG students...

== Transportation ==
Local roads have access to National Highway No.66 which connects to Mangalore in the north and Calicut in the south. The nearest railway station is Manjeshwar on Mangalore-Palakkad line. There is an airport at Mangalore.

== Languages ==
This locality is an essentially multi-lingual region. The people speak Tulu, Beary bashe, Konkani, Malayalam and Kannada. Migrant workers also speak Hindi and Tamil languages.

== Administration ==
This village is part of Manjeswaram assembly constituency which is again part of Kasaragod (Lok Sabha constituency)

== See also ==
- Manjeshwar
- Badaje
