= Jeppu =

Jeppu Mahakali padpu
- Locality
- Country: India
- State: Karnataka
- District: Dakshina Kannada

Languages
  - Official: Kannada
- Time zone: UTC+5:30 (IST)
- PIN: 575002
- Telephone code: 0824
- Vehicle registration: KA 19
- Lok Sabha constituency: Mangalore City South
- Climate: Humid (Köppen)

Jeppu is a locality in Mangalore city, Karnataka, India. It is situated on the southern part of Mangalore. Jeppu is on the bank of Nethravathi River. The National Highway 17 (India) passes through this locality.

Jeppu means sleep in local Tulu language. Tulu is the main language, which is spoken and understood by everyone in this locality. Beary And Dakhini Urdu is Spoken By Muslims in Jeppu. Konkani is another language that is commonly used. Jeppu is predominantly a residential area. However, there are several educational institutions run by Christian missionaries.

== Occupation ==
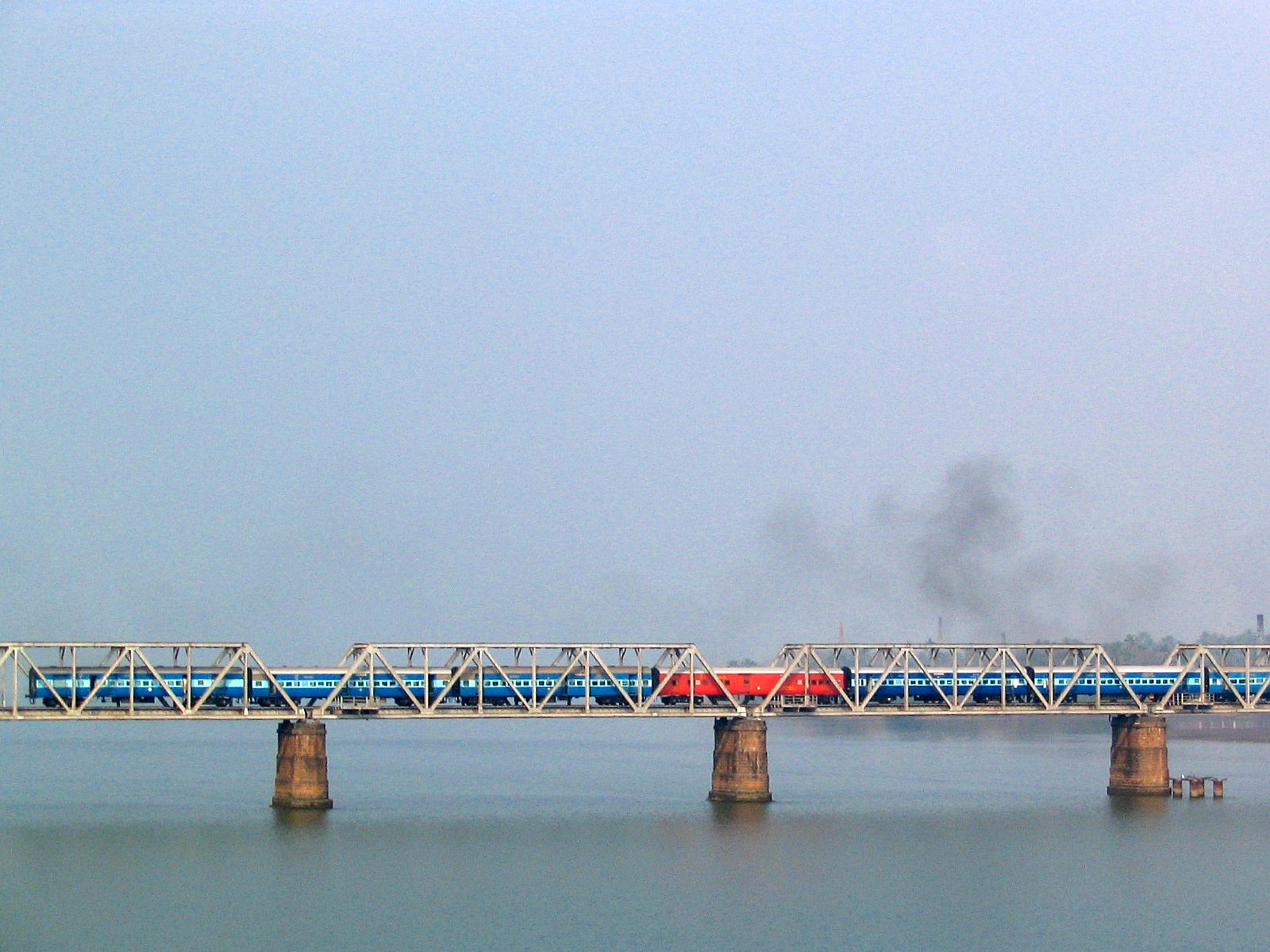
Nethravathi bridge

Jeppu is a low lying locality and is on the bank of the river Netravathi, and thus naturally agriculture and fishing have become the predominant occupations. Rice is the major crop grown here. However, in recent past people have stopped agriculture and now all the barren fields used by real estate can be seen. You can also find wood industries and tile factories in this locality.

== Educational institutions ==
1. St Joseph Seminary - Industrial Training Institute
2. Roshni Nilaya - College of Social Work
3. St. Gerosa High School
4. Cascia High School
5. St Rita's English Higher Primary School
6. St Rita's Kannada Higher Primary school
7. St John's Kannada Higher Primary School
8. St Gerosa English Higher Primary School
9. Btnms English school

== Religious places ==
1. Mangaladevi Temple. This is the temple of Goddess whom the city is named after. The dasara and navaratri festival are celebrated in a grand way here with a must-see processions at night.
2. Mahanavamikatte (Marnamikatte in Tulu): This is the place where the statue of goddess Mangaladevi is brought during Dasara festival
3. St Rita Cascia Church
4. St Joseph's Church
5. Gerosa Church
6. Muhyidheen Jumah Masjid
7. Bolar Islamic Centre

== Other important places ==
1. Jeppu Market: Separate vegetable & fish market along with some general stores
2. MphasiS: IT services company
3. Primary Health Care Centre run by the City Corporation
4. Shantinagar Graveyard
5. Mangalore Club
6. Bharat Maidan
7. Bhagini Samaj
8. Annachi ground
9. Father Muller's Hospital
10. Mahakalipdapu
11. Morgans Gate
12. Marnamikatte
13. Railway bridge across Nethravathi river.
14. Gujjar Kere
15. The Hindu Newspaper: Mangalore Office
16. Kusuma Stores.
