= Ullal Assembly constituency =

Former Assembly constituency in Karnataka, India

Coordinates: 12.814636°N 74.858622°E

Ullal
- Former constituency for the Karnataka Legislative Assembly

Constituency details
- Country: India
- Region: South India
- State: Karnataka
- Division: Mysore
- District: Dakshina Kannada
- Lok Sabha constituency: Mangalore
- Established: 1957
- Abolished: 2008
- Reservation: None

Ullal or Mangalore II Assembly constituency was one of the Karnataka Legislative Assemblies or Vidhan Sabha constituencies in Karnataka. It was part of Mangalore Lok Sabha constituency.

== Members of the Legislative Assembly ==
Election	Member	Party
1957	Gajanan Pandit	Indian National Congress
1962	A. Krishna Shetty	Communist Party of India
1967	B. M. Idinabba	Indian National Congress
1972	U. T. Fareed	Indian National Congress
1978	U. T. Fareed	Indian National Congress
1983	P. Ramachandra Rao	Communist Party of India
1985	B. M. Idinabba	Indian National Congress
1989	B. M. Idinabba	Indian National Congress
1994	K. Jayarama Shetty	Bharatiya Janata Party
1999	U. T. Fareed	Indian National Congress
2004	U. T. Fareed	Indian National Congress
2007 By-election (Note: Death of U. T. Fareed on 06/02/2007)	Uppala T. Khader Fareed	Indian National Congress

== Election results ==
=== Assembly By-election 2007 ===
2007 Karnataka Legislative Assembly by-election : Ullal
Party	Candidate	Votes	%	±%
INC	Uppala T. Khader Fareed	46,271	47.84%	▲2.63
BJP	Chandrashekar Uchchil	38,239	39.53%	▲1.27
JD(S)	Aboobakar Natekal	6,217	6.43%	▼1.30
CPI(M)	J. Balakrishna Shetty	4,803	4.97%	New
Independent	Bharathraj Shetty	1,196	1.24%	New
Margin of victory		8,032	8.30%	▲1.36
Turnout		96,726	60.11%	▼8.98
Total valid votes		96,726		
Registered electors		160,920		▲5.02
INC hold		Swing	▲2.63	

=== Assembly Election 2004 ===
2004 Karnataka Legislative Assembly election : Ullal
Party	Candidate	Votes	%	±%
INC	U. T. Fareed	47,839	45.21%	▼8.61
BJP	Chandrashekar Uchchil	40,491	38.26%	▲0.82
JD(S)	K. Jayarama Shetty	8,184	7.73%	New
CPI(M)	Ramachandra Uchil	7,320	6.92%	▼1.82
AIML	Muzafar	679	0.64%	New
Kannada Nadu Party	Vijayakumar Shetty	663	0.63%	New
Independent	Leelavathi. K	646	0.61%	New
Margin of victory		7,348	6.94%	▼9.43
Turnout		105,863	69.09%	▼1.68
Total valid votes		105,822		
Registered electors		153,222		▲14.32
INC hold		Swing	▼8.61	

=== Assembly Election 1999 ===
1999 Karnataka Legislative Assembly election : Ullal
Party	Candidate	Votes	%	±%
INC	U. T. Fareed	50,134	53.82%	▲28.96
BJP	K. Jayarama Shetty	34,881	37.44%	▲5.18
CPI(M)	B. Madhava	8,141	8.74%	▼8.64
Margin of victory		15,253	16.37%	▲8.98
Turnout		94,848	70.77%	▲7.05
Total valid votes		93,156		
Rejected ballots		1,692	1.78%	▲0.67
Registered electors		134,028		▲11.60
INC gain from BJP		Swing	▲21.56	

=== Assembly Election 1999 ===
1999 Karnataka Legislative Assembly election : Ullal
Party	Candidate	Votes	%	±%
INC	Uppala T. Khader Fareed	50,134	53.82%	▲28.96
BJP	K. Jayarama Shetty	34,881	37.44%	▲5.18
CPI(M)	B. Madhava	8,141	8.74%	▼8.64
Margin of victory		15,253	16.37%	▲8.98
Turnout		94,848	70.77%	▲7.05
Total valid votes		93,156		
Rejected ballots		1,692	1.78%	▲0.67
Registered electors		134,028		▲11.60
INC gain from BJP		Swing	▲21.56	

=== Assembly Election 1994 ===
1994 Karnataka Legislative Assembly election : Ullal
Party	Candidate	Votes	%	±%
BJP	K. Jayarama Shetty	24,412	32.26%	▲8.07
INC	K. S. Mohammed Massod	18,817	24.86%	▼11.68
CPI(M)	K. R. Shriyan	13,154	17.38%	▼11.49
JD	Nazeer Ullal	9,062	11.97%	New
Independent	Ismail Shaffi	3,844	5.08%	New
INC	Abdul Rasheed	2,836	3.75%	New
Independent	Dinakar Ullal	2,096	2.77%	New
Independent	J. Balakrishna Shetty	1,115	1.47%	New
Margin of victory		5,595	7.39%	▼0.28
Turnout		76,529	63.72%	▼1.71
Total valid votes		75,680		
Rejected ballots		849	1.11%	▼5.18
Registered electors		120,093		▲4.37
BJP gain from INC		Swing	▼4.28	

=== Assembly Election 1989 ===
1989 Karnataka Legislative Assembly election : Ullal
Party	Candidate	Votes	%	±%
INC	B. M. Idinabba	25,785	36.54%	▼9.27
CPI(M)	K. R. Shriyan	20,371	28.87%	▼1.14
BJP	K. Jayarama Shetty	17,069	24.19%	▲12.00
AIML	Sheikh Ibrahim Saheeb	4,463	6.33%	New
JP	Abdul Raheem	2,399	3.40%	New
Independent	S. V. Yashwantha Kumar	474	0.67%	New
Margin of victory		5,414	7.67%	▼8.12
Turnout		75,295	65.43%	▼0.48
Total valid votes		70,561		
Rejected ballots		4,734	6.29%	▲5.50
Registered electors		115,070		▲31.63
INC hold		Swing	▼9.27	

=== Assembly Election 1985 ===
1985 Karnataka Legislative Assembly election : Ullal
Party	Candidate	Votes	%	±%
INC	B. M. Idinabba	26,184	45.81%	▲18.35
CPI(M)	P. Ramachandra Rao	17,157	30.01%	▼2.43
BJP	Sundar Gatti	6,966	12.19%	▼6.09
Independent	Abbas Haji Kemmara	6,012	10.52%	New
Margin of victory		9,027	15.79%	▲10.81
Turnout		57,621	65.91%	▼1.32
Total valid votes		57,164		
Rejected ballots		457	0.79%	▼0.36
Registered electors		87,422		▲14.76
INC gain from CPI(M)		Swing	▲13.37	

=== Assembly Election 1983 ===
1983 Karnataka Legislative Assembly election : Ullal
Party	Candidate	Votes	%	±%
CPI(M)	P. Ramachandra Rao	16,423	32.44%	▲8.90
INC	K. S. Mohammed Massod	13,903	27.46%	▲26.27
Independent	U. Mohammed Ali	10,381	20.51%	New
BJP	Sundar Gatti	9,254	18.28%	New
Independent	Morris. A. D. Souza	660	1.30%	New
Margin of victory		2,520	4.98%	▼28.55
Turnout		51,212	67.23%	▼5.98
Total valid votes		50,621		
Rejected ballots		591	1.15%	▼0.23
Registered electors		76,176		▲4.02
CPI(M) gain from INC(I)		Swing	▼24.63	

=== Assembly Election 1978 ===
1978 Karnataka Legislative Assembly election : Ullal
Party	Candidate	Votes	%	±%
INC(I)	U. T. Fareed	30,174	57.07%	New
CPI(M)	P. Ramachandra Rao	12,445	23.54%	▼2.21
JP	Abdur Rahim Ahmed	8,911	16.85%	New
Independent	Garty Suvarna	711	1.34%	New
INC	K. A. Hameed	631	1.19%	▼52.60
Margin of victory		17,729	33.53%	▲5.49
Turnout		53,612	73.21%	▲1.84
Total valid votes		52,872		
Rejected ballots		740	1.38%	▲1.38
Registered electors		73,234		▼8.25
INC(I) gain from INC		Swing	▲3.28	

=== Assembly Election 1972 ===
1972 Mysore State Legislative Assembly election : Mangalore II
Party	Candidate	Votes	%	±%
INC	U. T. Fareed	30,048	53.79%	▲3.35
CPI(M)	A. Krishna Shetty	14,383	25.75%	▼7.42
ABJS	K. Narayana Shetty	6,227	11.15%	New
SWA	Louella Lobo	2,031	3.64%	New
INC(O)	M. A. Khader	1,654	2.96%	New
Independent	A. Ramamchandra	1,518	2.72%	New
Margin of victory		15,665	28.04%	▲10.77
Turnout		56,969	71.37%	▼0.15
Total valid votes		55,861		
Registered electors		79,818		▲29.75
INC hold		Swing	▲3.35	

=== Assembly Election 1967 ===
1967 Mysore State Legislative Assembly election : Mangalore II
Party	Candidate	Votes	%	±%
INC	B. M. Idinabba	21,365	50.44%	▲10.02
CPI(M)	A. K. Shetmy	14,051	33.17%	New
Independent	H. M. Rai	5,647	13.33%	New
Independent	J. Brito	1,292	3.05%	New
Margin of victory		7,314	17.27%	▲15.33
Turnout		43,997	71.52%	▼4.09
Total valid votes		42,355		
Registered electors		61,519		▲7.36
INC gain from CPI		Swing	▲8.07	

=== Assembly Election 1962 ===
1962 Mysore State Legislative Assembly election : Mangalore II
Party	Candidate	Votes	%	±%
CPI	A. Krishna Shetty	17,725	42.37%	▲0.70
INC	B. M. Idinabba	16,912	40.42%	▼17.91
SWA	H. Nagappa	4,230	10.11%	New
ABJS	Raghuath	1,740	4.16%	New
Independent	S. M. Sayed Ahamed	1,231	2.94%	New
Margin of victory		813	1.94%	▼14.72
Turnout		43,325	75.61%	▲16.64
Total valid votes		41,838		
Registered electors		57,302		▼3.06
CPI gain from INC		Swing	▼15.96	

=== Assembly Election 1957 ===
1957 Mysore State Legislative Assembly election : Mangalore II
Party	Candidate	Votes	%	±%
INC	Gajanan Pandit	20,332	58.33%	New
CPI	Kakkilaya. B. V	14,526	41.67%	New
Margin of victory		5,806	16.66%	
Turnout		34,858	58.97%	
Total valid votes		34,858		
Registered electors		59,113		
INC win (new seat)				

== See also ==
- Ullal
