= V. Dhananjay Kumar =

Indian politician (1951–2019)

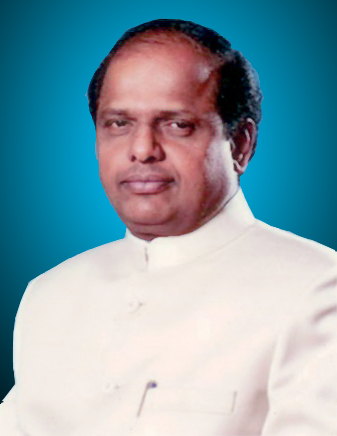

Minister of Civil Aviation and Tourism
- Prime Minister: Atal Bihari Vajpayee
- Preceded by: Ghulam Nabi Azad
- Succeeded by: C. M. Ibrahim

Member of Parliament
- In office 21 June 1991 – 21 May 2004
- Preceded by: Janardhana Poojary
- Succeeded by: D. V. Sadananda Gowda
- Constituency: Mangalore and Madikeri

Personal details
- Born: Venur Dhananjay Kumar Alva; 4 July 1951 Venur, Karnataka
- Died: 4 March 2019 (aged 67) Mangalore
- Party: Indian National Congress
- Other political affiliations: Bharatiya Janata Party; Janata Dal (Secular)
- Spouse: Vanitha D Kumar
- Children: 2, Pavithra V, Parinith Kumar Alva

Venur Dhananjay Kumar Alva (4 July 1951 – 4 March 2019) was a former Union and Cabinet minister of India and a former Member of Parliament from Mangalore. He was cabinet minister for Civil Aviation and Tourism in 1996, Union Minister of State for Finance from 1999 to 2000 and Union Minister of State for Textiles from 2000 to 2003. He was also one of the first few BJP MPs to be elected from south India, at a time when the Congress party's reach was at its peak.

Kumar went on to represent the Mangalore constituency in the Lok Sabha for four successive terms. Earlier in 1983, he was elected as a BJP MLA from Mangalore City assembly constituency comfortably defeating sitting MLA from Congress, P. F. Rodrigues, even before he became an MP. Being a staunch loyalist of former Chief Minister of Karnataka B. S. Yeddyurappa, he was elected as the president of the new Karnataka Janata Party. He was the Special representative of the Government of Karnataka to the Union Government in New Delhi.

== Biography ==
Born in Venur, a small town of erstwhile South Canara in 1951, Kumar earned degrees in science from Sri Mahaveera College, Moodabidri and law from Udupi Law College and held a number of influential positions in a political career that spanned decades. A firm believer of the RSS' Hindutva ideology, Kumar began his political career in the youth wing of Bharatiya Janta Party and later went on to become a Member of the Karnataka Legislative Assembly in 1983. In 1991, he was elected to the 10th Lok Sabha defeating the Congress stalwart Janardhana Poojary, Union Minister of State for Finance during the tenure of Indira Gandhi and Rajiv Gandhi.

With the rise of the Bharatiya Janta Party in Karnataka, Kumar went on to represent the Mangalore (Lok Sabha constituency) for four successive terms and served as Union Minister, thrice in the Government of India when the Bharatiya Janata Party was in power. He was cabinet minister for Civil Aviation and Tourism in 1996, Union Minister of State for Finance from 1999 to 2000 and Union Minister of State for Textiles from 2000 to 2003. Despite being a sitting MP, he was denied ticket for 2004 Loksabha election from Mangalore, instead D. V. Sadananda Gowda was preferred.

He was known for being staunchly loyal to BJP state president BS Yeddyurappa. After leaving the saffron party with B. S. Yeddyurappa, a former chief minister of Karnataka, Kumar was instrumental in starting a new political outfit, Karnataka Janata Party. Dhananjay was even made the state president of the party. He was unable to actively participate due to ill health.

Kumar died at Unity Hospital in Mangalore on 4 March 2019 after a prolonged illness due to kidney problem.
