= Surathkal Assembly constituency =

Former Assembly constituency in Karnataka, India

Coordinates: 12.998390°N 74.797809°E

Surathkal
- Former constituency for the Karnataka Legislative Assembly

Constituency details
- Country: India
- Region: South India
- State: Karnataka
- Division: Mysore
- District: Dakshina Kannada
- Lok Sabha constituency: Udupi
- Established: 1957
- Abolished: 2008
- Reservation: None

Surathkal Assembly constituency was one of the Karnataka Legislative Assemblies or Vidhan Sabha constituencies in Karnataka. It was part of Udupi Lok Sabha constituency.

== Members of the Legislative Assembly ==
Election	Member	Party
1957	B. R. Karkera	Indian National Congress
1959 By-election (Note: Died in 1959)	K. Doomappa	Indian National Congress
1962	Sanjeevanath Aikal	Praja Socialist Party
1967	P. V. Aithala	Praja Socialist Party
1972	B. Subbayya Shetty	Indian National Congress
1978	B. Subbayya Shetty	Indian National Congress
1983	Lokayya Shetty	Janata Party
1985	N. M. Adyanthaya	Indian National Congress
1989	Vijaya Kumar Shetty	Indian National Congress
1994	Kumble Sundara Rao	Bharatiya Janata Party
1999	Vijaya Kumar Shetty	Indian National Congress
2004	J. Krishna Palemar	Bharatiya Janata Party

== Election results ==
=== Assembly Election 2004 ===
2004 Karnataka Legislative Assembly election : Surathkal
Party	Candidate	Votes	%	±%
BJP	J. Krishna Palemar	57,808	48.71%	▲2.89
INC	Vijaya Kumar Shetty	54,496	45.92%	▼6.75
JD(S)	Suresh Chandra Shetty	4,136	3.48%	▲2.85
Kannada Nadu Party	Abubakar	1,267	1.07%	New
Independent	Suraiah	978	0.82%	New
Margin of victory		3,312	2.79%	▼4.06
Turnout		118,774	68.63%	▲0.36
Total valid votes		118,685		
Registered electors		173,068		▲13.74
BJP gain from INC		Swing	▼3.96	

=== Assembly Election 1999 ===
1999 Karnataka Legislative Assembly election : Surathkal
Party	Candidate	Votes	%	±%
INC	Vijaya Kumar Shetty	53,749	52.67%	▲21.96
BJP	Kumble Sundara Rao	46,760	45.82%	▲10.31
BSP	Aboobakker Kenjar	891	0.87%	New
JD(S)	Ibarhim Suratkal	647	0.63%	New
Margin of victory		6,989	6.85%	▲2.05
Turnout		103,872	68.27%	▲5.20
Total valid votes		102,047		
Rejected ballots		1,825	1.76%	▲0.67
Registered electors		152,158		▲13.91
INC gain from BJP		Swing	▲17.16	

=== Assembly Election 1994 ===
1994 Karnataka Legislative Assembly election : Surathkal
Party	Candidate	Votes	%	±%
BJP	Kumble Sundara Rao	29,589	35.51%	▲13.13
INC	Vijaya Kumar Shetty	25,587	30.71%	▼14.58
JD	Antony D'souza	12,375	14.85%	▼10.86
Independent	N. M. Adyanthaya	8,816	10.58%	New
INC	S. V. Ameen	5,076	6.09%	New
Independent	Radhakrishna Rai. K	1,530	1.84%	New
Margin of victory		4,002	4.80%	▼14.78
Turnout		84,250	63.07%	▼2.73
Total valid votes		83,329		
Rejected ballots		921	1.09%	▼3.97
Registered electors		133,579		▲7.29
BJP gain from INC		Swing	▼9.78	

=== Assembly Election 1989 ===
1989 Karnataka Legislative Assembly election : Surathkal
Party	Candidate	Votes	%	±%
INC	Vijaya Kumar Shetty	35,230	45.29%	▼9.30
JD	B. Subbayya Shetty	20,000	25.71%	New
BJP	Ramachander Baikampady	17,406	22.38%	New
JP	Madanmohan Naik	4,430	5.70%	New
Margin of victory		15,230	19.58%	▲9.12
Turnout		81,924	65.80%	▼0.41
Total valid votes		77,781		
Rejected ballots		4,143	5.06%	▲4.38
Registered electors		124,500		▲40.33
INC hold		Swing	▼9.30	

=== Assembly Election 1985 ===
1985 Karnataka Legislative Assembly election : Surathkal
Party	Candidate	Votes	%	±%
INC	N. M. Adyanthaya	31,846	54.59%	▲16.42
JP	Lokayya Shetty	25,745	44.13%	▼17.70
Independent	K. M. Moidinabba	413	0.71%	New
Margin of victory		6,101	10.46%	▼13.21
Turnout		58,740	66.21%	▲1.55
Total valid votes		58,338		
Rejected ballots		402	0.68%	▼0.93
Registered electors		88,719		▲20.02
INC gain from JP		Swing	▼7.24	

=== Assembly Election 1983 ===
1983 Karnataka Legislative Assembly election : Surathkal
Party	Candidate	Votes	%	±%
JP	Lokayya Shetty	29,082	61.83%	▲31.57
INC	N. M. Adyanthaya	17,951	38.17%	▲35.33
Margin of victory		11,131	23.67%	▼4.69
Turnout		47,801	64.66%	▼9.88
Total valid votes		47,033		
Rejected ballots		768	1.61%	▲0.11
Registered electors		73,922		▲8.03
JP gain from INC(I)		Swing	▲3.20	

=== Assembly Election 1978 ===
1978 Karnataka Legislative Assembly election : Surathkal
Party	Candidate	Votes	%	±%
INC(I)	B. Subbayya Shetty	29,452	58.63%	New
JP	J. R. Pais	15,203	30.26%	New
Independent	P. C. Srinivas Rao Patel	2,635	5.25%	New
INC	K. R. Shetty	1,428	2.84%	▼61.46
Independent	P. V. Aithala	1,233	2.45%	New
Margin of victory		14,249	28.36%	▼21.68
Turnout		51,002	74.54%	▲7.97
Total valid votes		50,237		
Rejected ballots		765	1.50%	▲1.50
Registered electors		68,426		▲3.01
INC(I) gain from INC		Swing	▼5.67	

=== Assembly Election 1972 ===
1972 Mysore State Legislative Assembly election : Surathkal
Party	Candidate	Votes	%	±%
INC	B. Subbayya Shetty	27,720	64.30%	▲25.98
SWA	Rathankumar Kattemar	6,148	14.26%	New
ABJS	Raghunath Kotenkar	5,254	12.19%	New
INC(O)	Prabhakara Rai	3,257	7.55%	New
Independent	K. Venkat Rao	732	1.70%	New
Margin of victory		21,572	50.04%	▲26.67
Turnout		44,216	66.57%	▼9.34
Total valid votes		43,111		
Registered electors		66,425		▲19.68
INC gain from PSP		Swing	▲2.62	

=== Assembly Election 1967 ===
1967 Mysore State Legislative Assembly election : Surathkal
Party	Candidate	Votes	%	±%
PSP	P. V. Aithala	25,090	61.68%	▲12.78
INC	K. N. Alva	15,586	38.32%	▲1.20
Margin of victory		9,504	23.37%	▲11.59
Turnout		42,134	75.91%	▲22.61
Total valid votes		40,676		
Registered electors		55,502		▲4.08
PSP hold		Swing	▲12.78	

=== Assembly Election 1962 ===
1962 Mysore State Legislative Assembly election : Surathkal
Party	Candidate	Votes	%	±%
PSP	Sanjeevanath Aikal	13,148	48.90%	▲10.95
INC	K. Doomappa	9,981	37.12%	▼6.82
Independent	Marian Pais	3,230	12.01%	New
ABJS	Sundara. B. Amin	529	1.97%	New
Margin of victory		3,167	11.78%	▲5.78
Turnout		28,423	53.30%	
Total valid votes		26,888		
Registered electors		53,328		
PSP gain from INC		Swing	▲4.96	

=== Assembly By-election 1959 ===
1959 Mysore State Legislative Assembly by-election : Surathkal
Party	Candidate	Votes	%	±%
INC	K. Doomappa	10,019	43.94%	▼13.06
PSP	S. Aikal	8,652	37.95%	▼5.05
COM	M. H. Krishnappa	4,128	18.11%	New
Margin of victory		1,367	6.00%	▼8.01
Total valid votes		22,799		
INC hold		Swing	▼13.06	

=== Assembly Election 1957 ===
1957 Mysore State Legislative Assembly election : Surathkal
Party	Candidate	Votes	%	±%
INC	B. R. Karkera	15,629	57.00%	New
PSP	Sanjeevanath Aikal	11,789	43.00%	New
Margin of victory		3,840	14.01%	
Turnout		27,418	51.83%	
Total valid votes		27,418		
Registered electors		52,903		
INC win (new seat)				

== See also ==
- Surathkal
