= Mangalore City South Assembly constituency =

Constituency of the Karnataka legislative assembly in India

Coordinates: 12.85°N 74.86°E

Mangalore City South
- Constituency No. 203 for the Karnataka Legislative Assembly

Constituency details
- Country: India
- Region: South India
- State: Karnataka
- District: Dakshina Kannada
- Lok Sabha constituency: Dakshina Kannada
- Established: 2008
- Total electors: 213,244
- Reservation: None

Member of Legislative Assembly
- 16th Karnataka Legislative Assembly
- Incumbent D. Vedavyas Kamath
- Party: Bharatiya Janata Party
- Elected year: 2023
- Preceded by: John Richard Lobo

Mangalore City South Assembly constituency is one of the Karnataka Legislative Assemblies or Vidhan Sabha constituencies in Karnataka. It is one of the three constituencies which represent Mangalore, the others being Mangalore and Mangalore City North. The constituency has around 17.5% Muslims and 14% Christians.

Mangalore South is part of Dakshina Kannada Lok Sabha constituency.

== Members of the Legislative Assembly ==
Election	Member	Party
2008	N. Yogish Bhat	Bharatiya Janata Party
2013	John Richard Lobo	Indian National Congress
2018	D. Vedavyas Kamath	Bharatiya Janata Party
2023	D. Vedavyas Kamath	Bharatiya Janata Party

== Election results ==
=== Assembly Election 2023 ===
2023 Karnataka Legislative Assembly election : Mangalore City South
Party	Candidate	Votes	%	±%
BJP	D. Vedavyas Kamath	91,437	56.46	▲3.49
INC	John Richard Lobo	67,475	41.67	▼1.46
NOTA	None of the above	1,203	0.74	▲0.09
Margin of victory		23,962	14.80	▲4.96
Turnout		162,735	66.20	▼1.96
Total valid votes		161,943		
Registered electors		245,805		▲2.38
BJP hold		Swing	▲3.49	

=== Assembly Election 2018 ===
2018 Karnataka Legislative Assembly election : Mangalore City South
Party	Candidate	Votes	%	±%
BJP	D. Vedavyas Kamath	86,545	52.97	▲8.50
INC	John Richard Lobo	70,470	43.13	▼11.16
CPI(M)	Sunil Kumar Bajal	2,329	1.43	▼0.98
NOTA	None of the above	1,063	0.65	New
Margin of victory		16,075	9.84	▲0.01
Turnout		163,656	68.16	▲3.64
Total valid votes		163,387		
Registered electors		240,092		▲17.08
BJP gain from INC		Swing	▼1.32	

=== Assembly Election 2013 ===
2013 Karnataka Legislative Assembly election : Mangalore City South
Party	Candidate	Votes	%	±%
INC	John Richard Lobo	67,829	54.29	▲11.13
BJP	N. Yogish Bhat	55,554	44.47	▼6.05
CPI(M)	Vasanth Achari	3,016	2.41	▼1.03
SDPI	Jaleel Krishnapura	1,672	1.34	New
JD(S)	S. P. Changappa	1,672	1.34	New
Margin of victory		12,275	9.83	▲2.47
Turnout		132,318	64.52	▲0.35
Total valid votes		124,927		
Registered electors		205,065		▲10.51
INC gain from BJP		Swing	▲3.77	

=== Assembly Election 2008 ===
2008 Karnataka Legislative Assembly election : Mangalore City South
Party	Candidate	Votes	%	±%
BJP	N. Yogish Bhat	60,133	50.52	New
INC	Ivan D'souza	51,373	43.16	New
CPI(M)	Yashavanth Maroli	4,089	3.44	New
Independent	B. Vishvanatha	1,728	1.45	New
Margin of victory		8,760	7.36	
Turnout		119,073	64.17	
Total valid votes		119,022		
Registered electors		185,560		
BJP win (new seat)				

== See also ==
- Mangalore Assembly constituency
- Mangalore City North
