= Mangalore City Assembly constituency =

Former Assembly constituency in Karnataka, India

Coordinates: 12.885437°N 74.838864°E

Mangalore City
- Former constituency for the Karnataka Legislative Assembly

Constituency details
- Country: India
- Region: South India
- State: Karnataka
- Division: Mysore
- District: Dakshina Kannada
- Lok Sabha constituency: Mangalore
- Established: 1957
- Abolished: 2008
- Reservation: None

Mangalore City or Mangalore I Assembly constituency was one of the Karnataka Legislative Assemblies or Vidhan Sabha constituencies in Karnataka. It was part of Mangalore Lok Sabha constituency.

== Members of the Legislative Assembly ==
Election	Member	Party
1957	Bantwal Vaikunta Baliga	Indian National Congress
1962	M. Shrinivasa Nayak	Indian National Congress
1967	M. Shrinivasa Nayak	Indian National Congress
1972	Addy Saldanha	Indian National Congress

== Election results ==
=== Assembly Election 1972 ===
1972 Mysore State Legislative Assembly election : Mangalore I
Party	Candidate	Votes	%	±%
INC	Addy Saldanha	21,994	49.74%	▲12.92
ABJS	C. G. Kamath	8,476	19.17%	▲1.59
CPI(M)	P. Ramachandra Rao	6,652	15.05%	New
INC(O)	S. K. Amin	6,418	14.52%	New
Independent	Joseph Aranha	674	1.52%	New
Margin of victory		13,518	30.57%	▲15.93
Turnout		44,758	70.10%	▼5.09
Total valid votes		44,214		
Registered electors		63,845		▲12.00
INC hold		Swing	▲12.92	

=== Assembly Election 1967 ===
1967 Mysore State Legislative Assembly election : Mangalore I
Party	Candidate	Votes	%	±%
INC	M. S. Nayak	15,105	36.82%	▼4.55
Independent	A. R. Ahmed	9,099	22.18%	New
ABJS	C. G. Kamath	7,214	17.58%	New
Independent	D. M. Roi	5,089	12.40%	New
CPI	A. S. Pai	3,568	8.70%	▼18.56
Independent	M. Brito	650	1.58%	New
Margin of victory		6,006	14.64%	▲0.53
Turnout		42,861	75.19%	▼5.01
Total valid votes		41,028		
Registered electors		57,002		▲10.74
INC hold		Swing	▼4.55	

=== Assembly Election 1962 ===
1962 Mysore State Legislative Assembly election : Mangalore I
Party	Candidate	Votes	%	±%
INC	M. Shrinivasa Nayak	16,785	41.37%	▼7.57
CPI	A. Shantharam Pai	11,059	27.26%	▼3.73
SWA	Laura Pais	9,588	23.63%	New
ABJS	C. G. Kamath	3,142	7.74%	New
Margin of victory		5,726	14.11%	▼3.84
Turnout		41,282	80.20%	▲25.24
Total valid votes		40,574		
Registered electors		51,476		▼15.39
INC hold		Swing	▼7.57	

=== Assembly Election 1957 ===
1957 Mysore State Legislative Assembly election : Mangalore I
Party	Candidate	Votes	%	±%
INC	Bantwal Vaikunta Baliga	16,365	48.94%	New
CPI	A. Shantharam Pai	10,364	30.99%	New
Independent	Laura Pais	4,766	14.25%	New
ABJS	Prabhakar	1,945	5.82%	New
Margin of victory		6,001	17.95%	
Turnout		33,440	54.96%	
Total valid votes		33,440		
Registered electors		60,842		
INC win (new seat)				

== See also ==
- Mangalore
