= U. T. Khader =

Indian politician

U. T. Khader Fareed
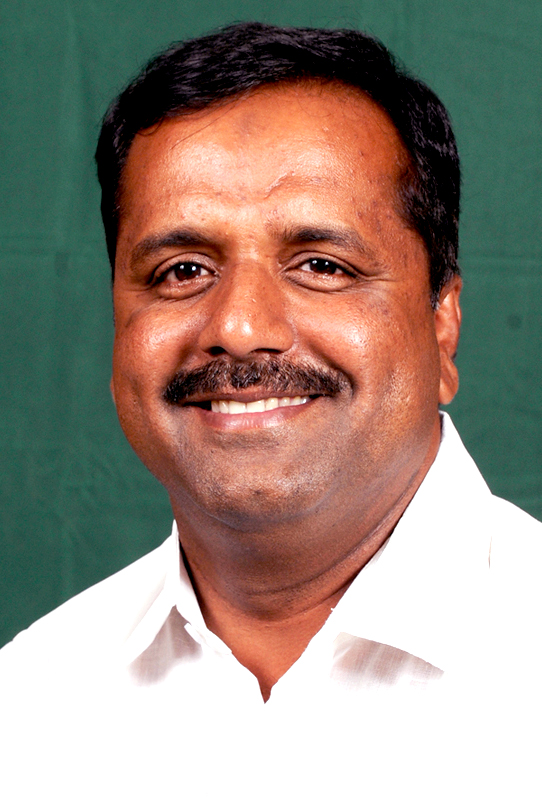

Minister for Health and Family Welfare
- Incumbent
- Assumed office June 2026
- Leader of the House: D. K. Shivakumar
- Deputy Speaker: Mankala Subba Vaidya
- Preceded by: Dinesh Gundu Rao

17th Speaker of Karnataka Legislative Assembly
- In office 24 May 2023 – 03 June 2026
- Preceded by: Vishweshwar Hegde Kageri
- Succeeded by: Gurupadagouda Patil

Minister for Health and Family Welfare
- In office 20 May 2013 – 20 June 2016

Minister for Food, Civil Supplies and Consumer Affairs
- In office 20 June 2016 – 2018
- Preceded by: Dinesh Gundu Rao

Minister for Urban Development and Housing
- In office June 2018 – July 2019

Deputy Leader of the Opposition of the Karnataka Legislative Assembly
- In office January 2022 – 13 May 2023

Member of the Karnataka Legislative Assembly
- Incumbent
- Assumed office 2008
- Preceded by: Constituency created
- Constituency: Mangalore
- In office 2007–2007
- Preceded by: U. T. Fareed
- Succeeded by: Constituency abolished
- Constituency: Ullal

Personal details
- Born: 12 October 1969 (age 57) Uppala, Kasargod, Kerala State, India
- Party: Indian National Congress
- Parents: U. T. Fareed (father); Naseema (mother)
- Occupation: Advocate
- As of June, 2026

U. T. Khader Fareed is an Indian politician who is currently serving as the Minister for Health and Family Welfare, Government of Karnataka, having assumed office in June 2026. He formerly served as the 17th Speaker of the Karnataka Legislative Assembly from May 2023 to June 2026.

He previously served as the Cabinet Minister for Health & Family Welfare, Food, Civil Supplies and Consumer Affairs, and Urban Development and Housing in the Government of Karnataka.

Khader is a fourth-term MLA representing the Mangalore constituency (previously known as the Ullal) of the Karnataka Legislative Assembly.

He is a member of the Indian National Congress and was the only Congress MLA to win from the Dakshina Kannada and Udupi districts in the 2018 Karnataka Legislative Assembly election.

He defeated Santosh Kumar Rai of BJP by a margin of 19,739 votes in the 2018 Assembly election.

He defeated Sathish Kumpala of the BJP by a margin of 22,977 votes in the 2023 Assembly election.

== Early life ==
Khader was born and brought up in Uppala, Kasargod. His mother is Naseema and his father is the Haji U. T. Fareed. He has three brothers and one sister.

== Political career ==
He was the Minister for Health and Family Welfare of Karnataka from 20 May 2013 to 20 June 2016 as part of the Siddaramaiah cabinet.

Khader previously served as the deputy opposition leader of the Karnataka Legislative Assembly.
