= Janardhana Poojary =

Indian politician (born 1937)

B. Janardhana Poojary

Minister of State for Rural Development
- In office 1988–1989
- Prime Minister: Rajiv Gandhi

Minister of State for Finance
- In office 1985–1987
- Prime Minister: Rajiv Gandhi

Deputy Minister of Finance
- In office 1982–1984
- Prime Minister: Indira Gandhi

Member of Parliament, Lok Sabha
- In office 1977–1991
- Constituency: Mangalore

Member of Parliament, Rajya Sabha
- In office 10 April 2002 – 9 April 2008
- Constituency: Karnataka

Member of Parliament, Rajya Sabha
- In office 3 April 1994 – 2 April 2000
- Constituency: Karnataka

President of the Karnataka Pradesh Congress Committee
- In office 2003–2005
- Preceded by: Allum Veerabhadrappa
- Succeeded by: Mallikarjun Kharge

President of the Karnataka Pradesh Congress Committee
- In office 1987–1988
- Preceded by: Oscar Fernandes
- Succeeded by: Veerendra Patil

Personal details
- Born: 27 April 1937 (age 89) Mangalore, Madras Presidency, British India
- Party: Indian National Congress
- Education: B.Com., LL.B.
- Occupation: Advocate, politician

B. Janardhana Poojary (born 27 April 1937) is a senior politician from Indian National Congress party. He was a former Union Minister and Karnataka's Congress President. During the Prime Ministership of Smt. Indira Gandhi he had been appointed Union Minister of State for Finance in 1982 and he continued to be Union Minister of State for Finance during the tenure of Rajiv Gandhi until 1987. Later Prime Minister Rajiv Gandhi appointed Shree B. Janardhana Poojary as Union Minister of State for Rural Development from 1987 to 1989. Shree Rajiv Gandhi also appointed Shree B. Janardhana Poojary as General Secretary of All India Congress Committee in 1990 as well as President of Karnataka Pradesh Congress Committee in 1990. He continued to be General Secretary of All India Congress Committee during the tenure of Prime Minister Shree P. V. Narasimha Rao up to 1996. After Shree Rajiv Gandhi his wife All India Congress Committee President (AICC President) & United Progressive Alliance (UPA) Chairperson Smt. Sonia Gandhi also appointed Shree B. Janardhana Poojary as President of Karnataka Pradesh Congress Committee in 2003 for the second time. He continued as President of Karnataka Pradesh Congress Committee up to 2005.

== Early life ==
Janardhana Poojary was born to an ethnic Billava family in Mangalore and his mother-tongue is Tulu.

== Career ==
Prior to entering politics, Janardhana Poojary practiced law as a barrister from 1960 to 1979. As a lawyer, he was actively engaged in safeguarding the interests of poor agricultural tenants and defended a large number of poor people by giving them free legal aid. He was elected to the 6th Lok Sabha in 1977 from Mangalore constituency in Karnataka. He was re-elected to the Lok Sabha in 1980, 1984 and 1989 from the same constituency. He was a Central (Union) Deputy Minister in the Ministry of Finance from 1982-84. From 1984 to '87 he was the Central (Union) Minister of State for Finance. He was the Central Minister of State for Rural Development in 1988-89. He was defeated by V. Dhananjay Kumar during 1991 Lokhsabha election. Despite his best efforts he was defeated by BJP candidates in successive elections. In April 1994, he was elected to the Rajya Sabha, the upper house of the Indian Parliament – a position he held until May 2008.

He was responsible for the construction of several colleges, schools and temples, including the Gokarnanatheshwara Temple (Kudroli Temple) in Mangalore. He also took active part in construction of Dharmasthala Kanyadi Shree Raam Mandir. He also took initiative in the renovation of Kankanady Shree Brahma Baiderkala Garodi Temple & Katpady Shree Vishwanatha Temple.

Under his leadership many temples, Garodi temples, Narayana Guru mandira have been constructed across Tulunadu which comprises Mangalore, Udupi, Chikmagalur, Karwar and Kasargod.

During his tenure as Central (Union) Minister of State for Finance, he organized credit camps (Loan Melas) to give assistance to the weaker sections of the society. The politicisation of bank credit policies, led to the creation of significant non-performing assets on the books of public sector banks. The loan disbursal was also undertaken in violation of prescribed Reserve Bank of India norms.

He has brought several projects not only to Mangalore but for entire Karnataka. Some of the projects are Kudremukh Iron Ore Company Limited (KIOCL), Mangalore Refinery & Petrochemicals Limited (MRPL), Upgrading Mangalore Domestic (National) Airport to Mangalore International Airport, Upgrading Karnataka Regional Engineering College (KREC) to National Institute Of Technology (NITK), extension of New Mangalore Port (NMPT), railway projects like Bangalore/Mangalore Day & Night Train, Four Lane Highway Projects of about 60 km from Bantwal To Surathkal.
