= Ganga Lake (Mongolia) =

Lake in Dariganga, Sükhbaatar, Mongolia

- Location within Mongolia
- Location: Sükhbaatar Province
- Coordinates: 45°15′N 114°00′E
- Basin countries: Mongolia
- Max. length: 2.1 km (1.3 mi)
- Max. width: 1.6 km (0.99 mi)
- Surface area: 2.2 km^{2} (0.85 sq mi)
- Surface elevation: 1,294 m (4,245 ft)

Ramsar Wetland
- Official name: Lake Ganga and its surrounding wetlands
- Designated: 22 March 2004
- Reference no.: 1378

Ganga Lake (Mongolian: Ганга нуур) is a saltwater lake located in Dariganga District, Sükhbaatar Province, Mongolia. The lake lies on the transition zone between the southern steppes and the Gobi Desert, giving it a unique landscape of lakes, steppes, and sand dunes. The lake and its wetlands (of which the total area is 32.8 km²) is an important breeding and resting area for endangered migratory birds, including the great crested grebe, the whooper swan, and the ruddy shelduck.

Due to ongoing climate change, the lake area is shrinking.

Neighboring lakes include Duut Lake, Sumtiin Lake, Erdene Lake, Kholboo Lake, Züün Kholboo Lake, Tsagaan Lake, Khoshmogt Lake, Red Lake (dried up), and Zegst Lake.

The lake and its surrounding wetlands was designated a Ramsar site in 2004, and has been designated an Important Bird Area by BirdLife International.

== Naming ==
The name Ganga is another term for the River Ganges. A folk legend states that the 8th century Mongol nobleman Togtokhtör wang had two flasks of water brought from the holy river Ganga (India) and put in the lake, thereby giving the lake its name.
