= Ganges =

Major river in Asia

Ganges (Ganga)
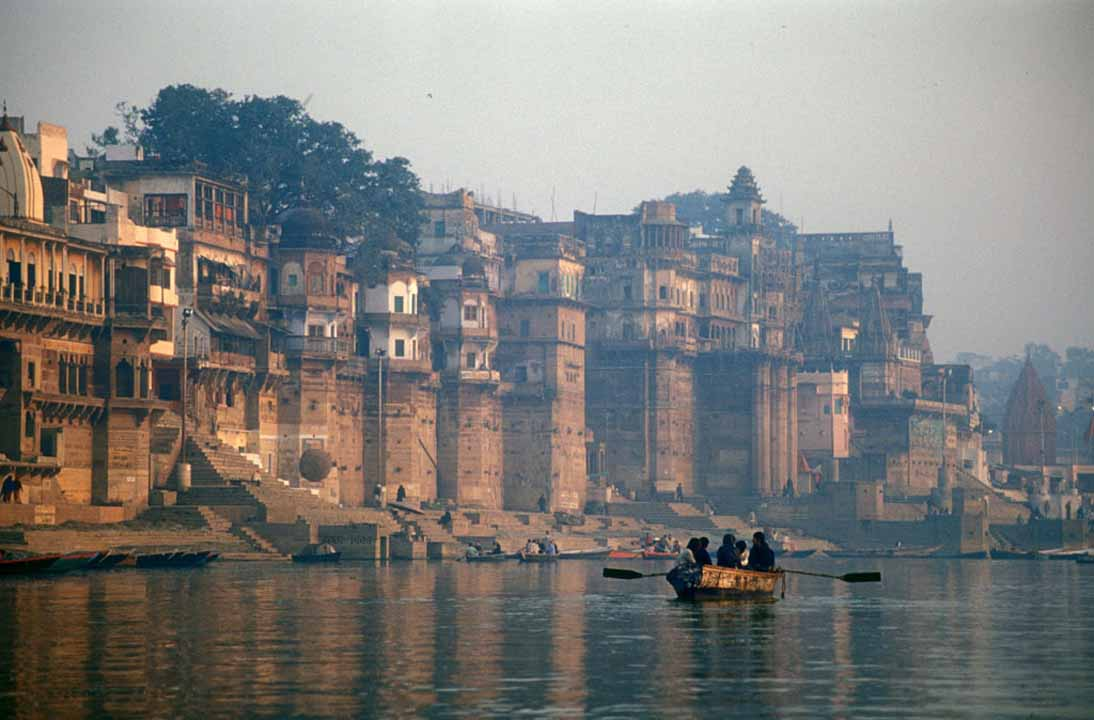
- The Ganges in Varanasi

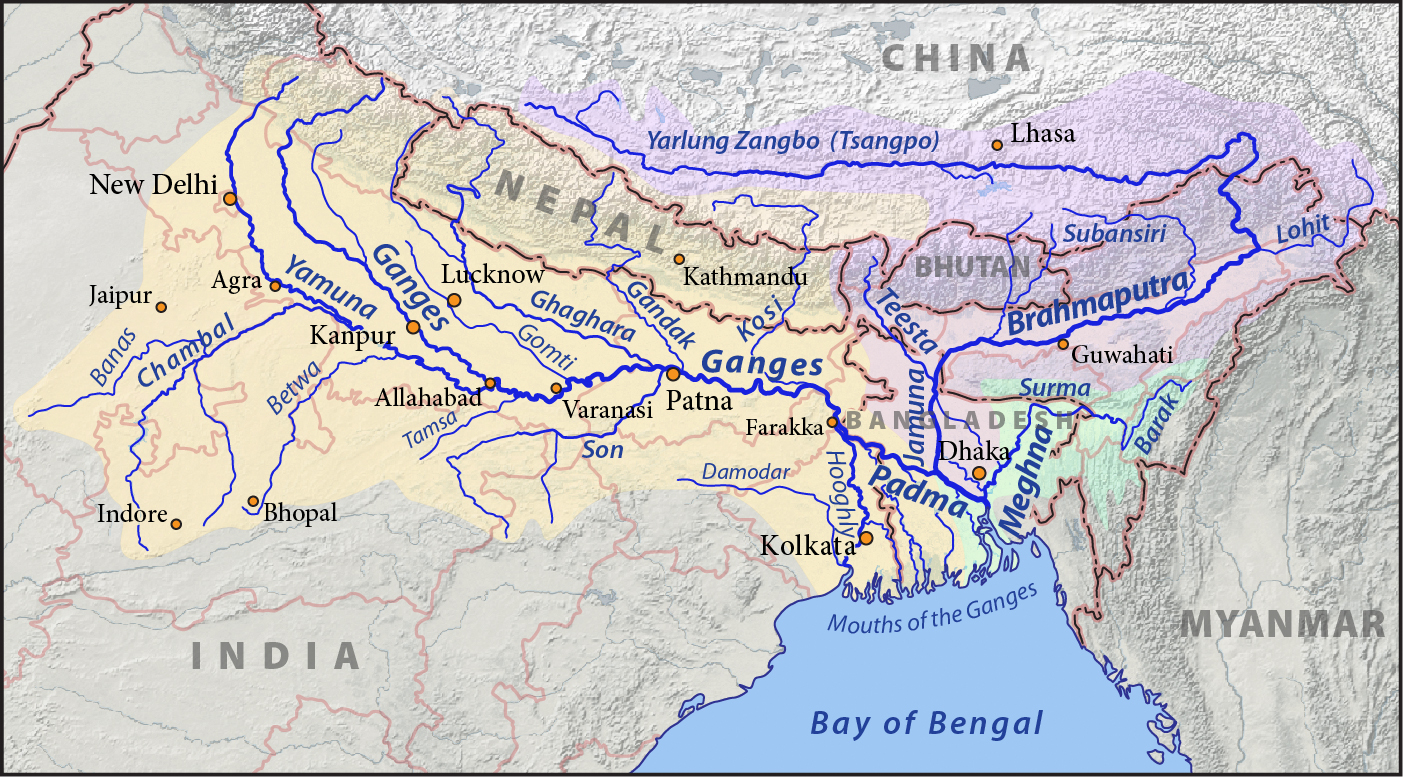
- Map of the combined drainage basins of the Ganges (yellow), Brahmaputra (violet) and Meghna (green)
- Etymology: Ganga (goddess)

Location
- Country: India (as Ganga), Bangladesh (as Padma)
- Cities: Uttarakhand: Rishikesh & Haridwar Uttar Pradesh: Bijnor, Garhmukteshwar, Hasanpur, Anupshahr, Farrukhabad, Fatehgarh, Kannauj, Kanpur, Fatehpur, Kunda, Prayagraj, Mirzapur, Varanasi, Mughalsarai, Ghazipur & Ballia Bihar: Chausa, Buxar, Chhapra, Danapur, Patna, Hajipur, Barh, Mokama, Begusarai, Munger, Sultanganj, Bhagalpur & Manihari Jharkhand: Sahibganj West Bengal: Murshidabad, Palashi, Nabadwip, Shantipur, Kolkata, Serampore, Chinsurah, Baranagar, Diamond Harbour, Haldia, Budge Budge, Howrah, Uluberia & Barrackpore Rajshahi Division: Rajshahi, Pabna, Ishwardi Khulna Division: Kushtia, Shilaidaha Dhaka Division: Dhaka, Narayanganj, Gazipur, Munshiganj, Faridpur Chittagong Division: Chandpur, Noakhali Barisal Division: Bhola

Physical characteristics
- Source: Confluence at Devprayag, Uttarakhand of the Alaknanda river (the source stream in hydrology because of its greater length) and the Bhagirathi river (the source stream in Hindu tradition). The headwaters of the river include: Mandakini, Nandakini, Pindar and the Dhauliganga, all tributaries of the Alaknanda.
  - location: Devprayag, the beginning of the main stem of the Ganges
- Mouth: Bay of Bengal
  - location: Ganges Delta
  - coordinates: 22.0°N 90.9°E
- Length: 2,525 km (1,569 mi)
- Basin size: 1,999,000 km^{2} (772,000 mi^{2})
- Discharge
  - location: Mouth of the Ganges
  - average: Total runoff into the Bay of Bengal (Period: 1921–1985)43,704 m^{3}/s (1,543,400 cu ft/s) (Period: 1990–2020)1,350 km^{3}/a (43,000 m^{3}/s) (dry period 38,129 m³/s, wet period 53,170 m³/s;)
- Discharge
  - location: Ganges Delta, Bay of Bengal
  - average: (Ganges without Brahmaputra and Meghna) 18,691 m^{3}/s (660,100 cu ft/s)
- Discharge
  - location: Farakka Barrage
  - average: 16,648 m^{3}/s (587,900 cu ft/s)
  - minimum: 180 m^{3}/s (6,400 cu ft/s)
  - maximum: 70,000 m^{3}/s (2,500,000 cu ft/s)

Basin features
- Tributaries
  - left: Ramganga, Garra, Gomti, Tamsa Ghaghara, Gandak, Burhi Gandak, Koshi, Mahananda
  - right: Yamuna, Tamsa (also known as Tons River), Karamnasa, Sone, Punpun, Falgu, Kiul, Chandan, Ajay, Damodar, Rupnarayan

The Ganges (Note: Pronunciation: /ˈɡændʒiːz/, GAN-jeez) (in India: Ganga; (Note: Pronunciation: /ˈɡʌŋɡɑː/, GUNG-gah) in Bangladesh: Padma (Note: Pronunciation: /ˈpʌdmə/, PUD-mə) (Note: Attributed to multiple references:)) is a trans-boundary river of Asia which flows through India and Bangladesh. The 2,525-kilometre-long (1,569 mi) river rises in the western Himalayas in the Indian state of Uttarakhand. It flows south and east through the Gangetic plain of North India, receiving the right-bank tributary, the Yamuna, which also rises in the western Indian Himalayas, and several left-bank tributaries from Nepal that account for the bulk of its flow. In West Bengal, India, a feeder canal taking off from its right bank diverts half of its flow southwards, artificially connecting it to the Hooghly River. The Ganges continues into Bangladesh, its name changing to the Padma. It is then joined by the Jamuna, the lower stream of the Brahmaputra, and eventually the Meghna, forming the major estuary of the Ganges Delta, and emptying into the Bay of Bengal. The Ganges–Brahmaputra–Meghna system is the second-largest river on earth by discharge.

The main stem of the Ganges begins at Devprayag, at the confluence of the Alaknanda, which is the source stream in hydrology on account of its greater length, and the Bhagirathi, which is considered the source stream in Hindu mythology.

The Ganges is a lifeline to hundreds of millions of people who live in its basin and depend on it for their daily needs. It has been important historically, with many former provincial or imperial capitals such as Pataliputra, Kannauj, Sonargaon, Dhaka, Bikrampur, Kara, Munger, Kashi, Patna, Hajipur, Kanpur, Delhi, Bhagalpur, Murshidabad, Baharampur, Kampilya, and Kolkata located on its banks or those of its tributaries and connected waterways. The river is home to approximately 140 species of fish, 90 species of amphibians, and also reptiles and mammals, including critically endangered species such as the gharial and South Asian river dolphin. The Ganges is the most sacred river to Hindus. It is worshipped as the goddess Ganga in Hinduism.

The Ganges is threatened by severe pollution. This not only poses a danger to humans but also to many species of animals. The levels of fecal coliform bacteria from human waste (feces and urine) in the river near Varanasi are more than 100 times the Indian government's official limit. The Ganga Action Plan, an environmental initiative to clean up the river, has been considered a failure (Note: Haberman (2006) "The Ganga Action Plan, commonly known as GAP, was launched dramatically in the holy city of Banares (Varanasi) on 14 June 1985, by Prime Minister Rajiv Gandhi, who promised, 'We shall see that the waters of the Ganga become clean once again.' The stated task was 'to improve water quality, permit safe bathing all along the 2,525 kilometers from the Ganges's origin in the Himalayas to the Bay of Bengal, and make the water potable at important pilgrim and urban centres on its banks.' The project was designed to tackle pollution from twenty-five cities and towns along its banks in Uttar Pradesh, Bihar, and West Bengal by intercepting, diverting, and treating their effluents. With the GAP's Phase II, three important tributaries—Damodar, Gomati, and Yamuna—were added to the plan. Although some improvements have been made to the quality of the Ganges's water, many people claim that the GAP has been a major failure. The environmental lawyer M. C. Mehta, for example, filed public interest litigation against the project, claiming 'GAP has collapsed.'") (Note: Gardner (2003) "The Ganges, also known as the Ganga, is one of the world's major rivers, running for more than 2,500 kilometres from the Himalayas to the Bay of Bengal. It is also one of the most polluted, primarily from sewage, but also from animal carcasses, human corpses, and soap, and other pollutants from bathers. Indeed, scientists measure fecal coliform levels at thousands of times what is permissible and levels of oxygen in the water are similarly unhealthy. Renewal efforts have centred primarily on the government-sponsored Ganga Action Plan (GAP), started in 1985 intending to clean up the river by 1993. Several western-style sewage treatment plants were built along the river, but they were poorly designed, poorly maintained, and prone to shut down during the region's frequent power outages. The GAP has been a colossal failure, and many argue that the river is more polluted now than it was in 1985." (p. 166)) which is variously attributed to corruption, a lack of care from the government, poor technical expertise, (Note: Sheth (2008) "But the Indian government, as a whole, appears typically ineffective. Its ability to address itself to a national problem like environmental degradation is typified by the 20-year, $100 million Ganga Action Plan, whose purpose was to clean up the Ganges River. Leading Indian environmentalists call the plan a complete failure, due to the same problems that have always beset the government: poor planning, corruption, and a lack of technical knowledge. The river, they say, is more polluted than ever." (pp. 67–68)) poor environmental planning, (Note: Singh & Singh (2007) "In February 1985, the Ministry of Environment and Forest, Government of India launched the Ganga Action Plan, an environmental project to improve the river water quality. It was the largest single attempt to clean up a polluted river anywhere in the world and has not achieved any success in terms of preventing pollution load and improvement in the water quality of the river. Failure of the Ganga Action Plan may be directly linked with environmental planning without proper understanding of the human-environment interactions. The bibliography of selected environmental research studies on the Ganga River is, therefore, an essential first step for preserving and maintaining the Ganga River ecosystem in future.") and a lack of support from religious authorities. (Note: Puttick (2008) "Sacred ritual is only one source of pollution. The main source of contamination is organic waste—sewage, trash, food, and human and animal remains. Around a billion liters of untreated raw sewage are dumped into the Ganges each day, along with massive amounts of agricultural chemicals (including DDT), industrial pollutants, and toxic chemical waste from the booming industries along the river. The level of pollution is now 10,000 percent higher than the government standard for safe river bathing (let alone drinking). One result of this situation is an increase in waterborne diseases, including cholera, hepatitis, typhoid, and amoebic dysentery. An estimated 80 percent of all health problems and one-third of deaths in India are attributable to waterborne illnesses." (p. 247) "There have been various projects to clean up the Ganges and other rivers, led by the Indian government's Ganga Action Plan launched in 1985 by Rajiv Gandhi, grandson of Jawaharlal Nehru. Its relative failure has been blamed on mismanagement, corruption, and technological mistakes, but also lack of support from religious authorities. This may well be partly because the Brahmin priests are so invested in the idea of the Ganges' purity and afraid that any admission of its pollution will undermine the central role of the water in ritual, as well as their own authority. There are many temples along the river, conducting a brisk trade in ceremonies, including funerals, and sometimes also the sale of bottled Ganga Jal. The more traditional Hindu priests still believe that blessing Ganga Jal purifies it, although they are now a very small minority given the scale of the problem." (p. 248) "Wildlife is also under threat, particularly the river dolphins. They were one of the world's first protected species, given special status under the reign of Emperor Ashoka in the 3rd century BC. They're now a critically endangered species, although protected once again by the Indian government (and internationally under the CITES convention). Their numbers have shrunk by 75 per cent over the last 15 years, and they have become extinct in the main tributaries, mainly because of pollution and habitat degradation." (p. 275))

== Course ==
The upper phase of the river Ganges begins at the confluence of the Bhagirathi and Alaknanda rivers in the town of Devprayag in the Garhwal division of the Indian state of Uttarakhand. The Bhagirathi is considered to be the source in Hindu culture and mythology, although the Alaknanda is longer, and therefore, hydrologically the source stream. The headwaters of the Alakananda are formed by snow melt from peaks such as Nanda Devi, Trisul, and Kamet. The Bhagirathi rises at the foot of Gangotri Glacier at Gomukh, at an elevation of 4,356 m (14,291 ft) and was mythologically referred to as residing in the matted locks of Shiva; symbolically Tapovan, which is a meadow of ethereal beauty at the feet of Mount Shivling, just 5 km (3.1 mi) away.

Although many small streams comprise the headwaters of the Ganges, the six longest and their five confluences are considered sacred. The six headstreams are the Alaknanda, Dhauliganga, Nandakini, Pindar, Mandakini and Bhagirathi. Their confluences, known as the Panch Prayag, are all along the Alaknanda. They are, in downstream order, Vishnuprayag, where the Dhauliganga joins the Alaknanda; Nandprayag, where the Nandakini joins; Karnaprayag, where the Pindar joins; Rudraprayag, where the Mandakini joins; and finally, Devprayag, where the Bhagirathi joins the Alaknanda to form the Ganges.

After flowing for 256.90 km (159.63 mi) through its narrow Himalayan valley, the Ganges emerges from the mountains at Rishikesh, then debouches onto the Gangetic Plain at the pilgrimage town of Haridwar. At Haridwar, a headworks diverts some of its water into the Ganges Canal, which irrigates the Doab region of Uttar Pradesh, whereas the river, whose course has been roughly southwest until this point, now begins to flow southeast through the plains of northern India.

The Ganges river follows a 900 km (560 mi) arching course passing through the cities of Bijnor, Kannauj, Farukhabad, and Kanpur. Along the way it is joined by the Ramganga, which contributes an average annual flow of about 495 m^{3}/s (17,500 cu ft/s) to the river. The Ganges joins the 1,444 km (897 mi) long River Yamuna at the Triveni Sangam at Prayagraj (previously Allahabad), a confluence considered holy in Hinduism. At their confluence the Yamuna is larger than the Ganges contributing about 58.5% of the combined flow, with an average flow of 2,948 m^{3}/s (104,100 cu ft/s).

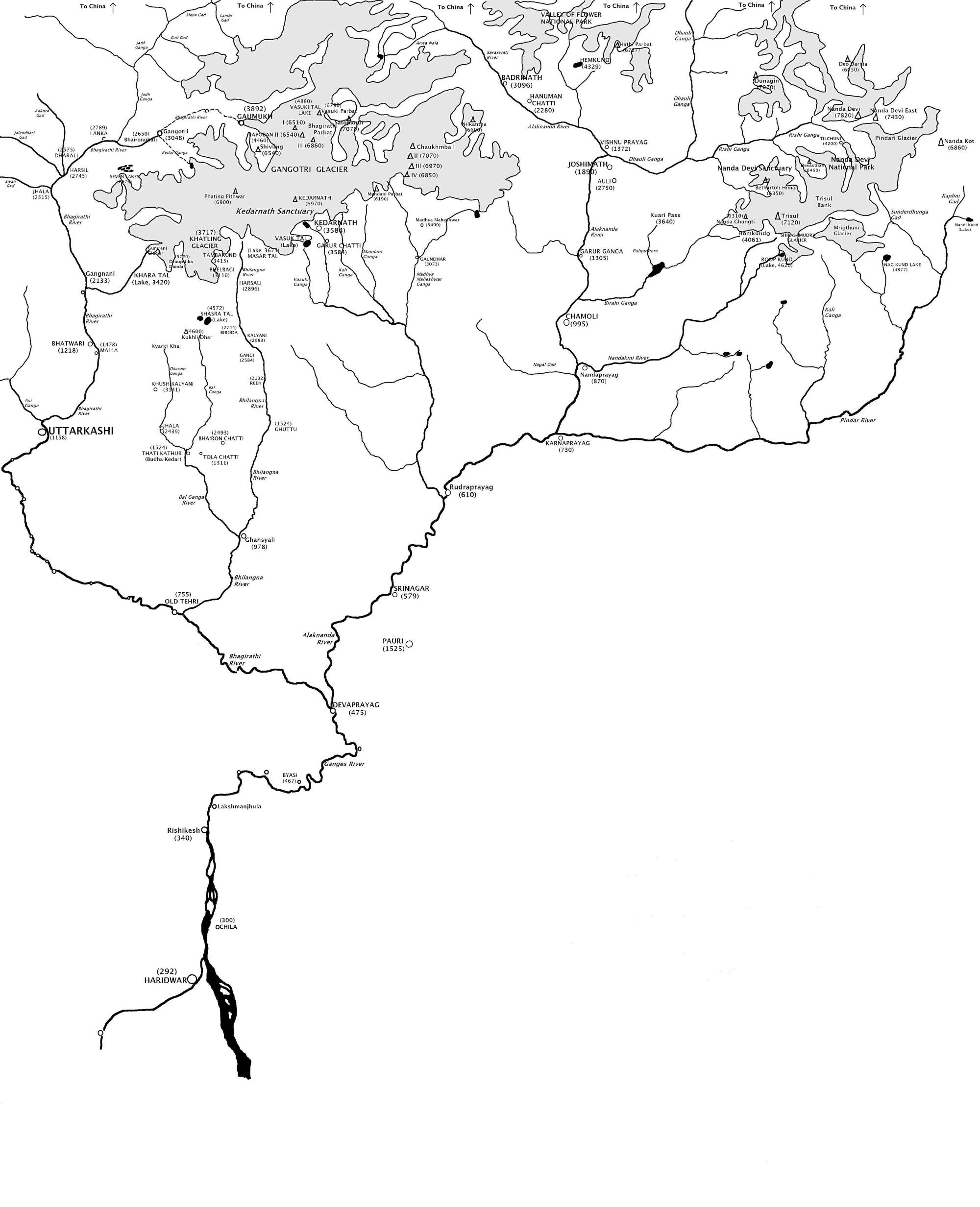
The Himalayan headwaters of the Ganges River in the Garhwal region of Uttarakhand, India.

Now flowing east, the river meets the 400 km (250 mi) long Tamsa River (also called Tons), which flows north from the Kaimur Range and contributes an average flow of about 187 m^{3}/s (6,600 cu ft/s). After the Tamsa, the 625 km (388 mi) long Gomti River joins, flowing south from the Himalayas. The Gomti contributes an average annual flow of about 234 m^{3}/s (8,300 cu ft/s). Then the 1,156 km (718 mi) long Ghaghara River (Karnali River), also flowing south from the Himalayas of Tibet through Nepal joins. The Ghaghara (Karnali), with its average annual flow of about 2,991 m^{3}/s (105,600 cu ft/s), is the largest tributary of the Ganges by discharge. After the Ghaghara confluence, the Ganges is joined from the south by the 784 km (487 mi) long Son River, which contributes about 1,008 m^{3}/s (35,600 cu ft/s). The 814 km (506 mi) long Gandaki River, then the 729 km (453 mi) long Kosi River, join from the north flowing from Nepal, contributing about 1,654 m^{3}/s (58,400 cu ft/s) and 2,166 m^{3}/s (76,500 cu ft/s), respectively. The Kosi is the third largest tributary of the Ganges by discharge, after Ghaghara (Karnali) and Yamuna. The Kosi merges into the Ganges near Kursela in Bihar.

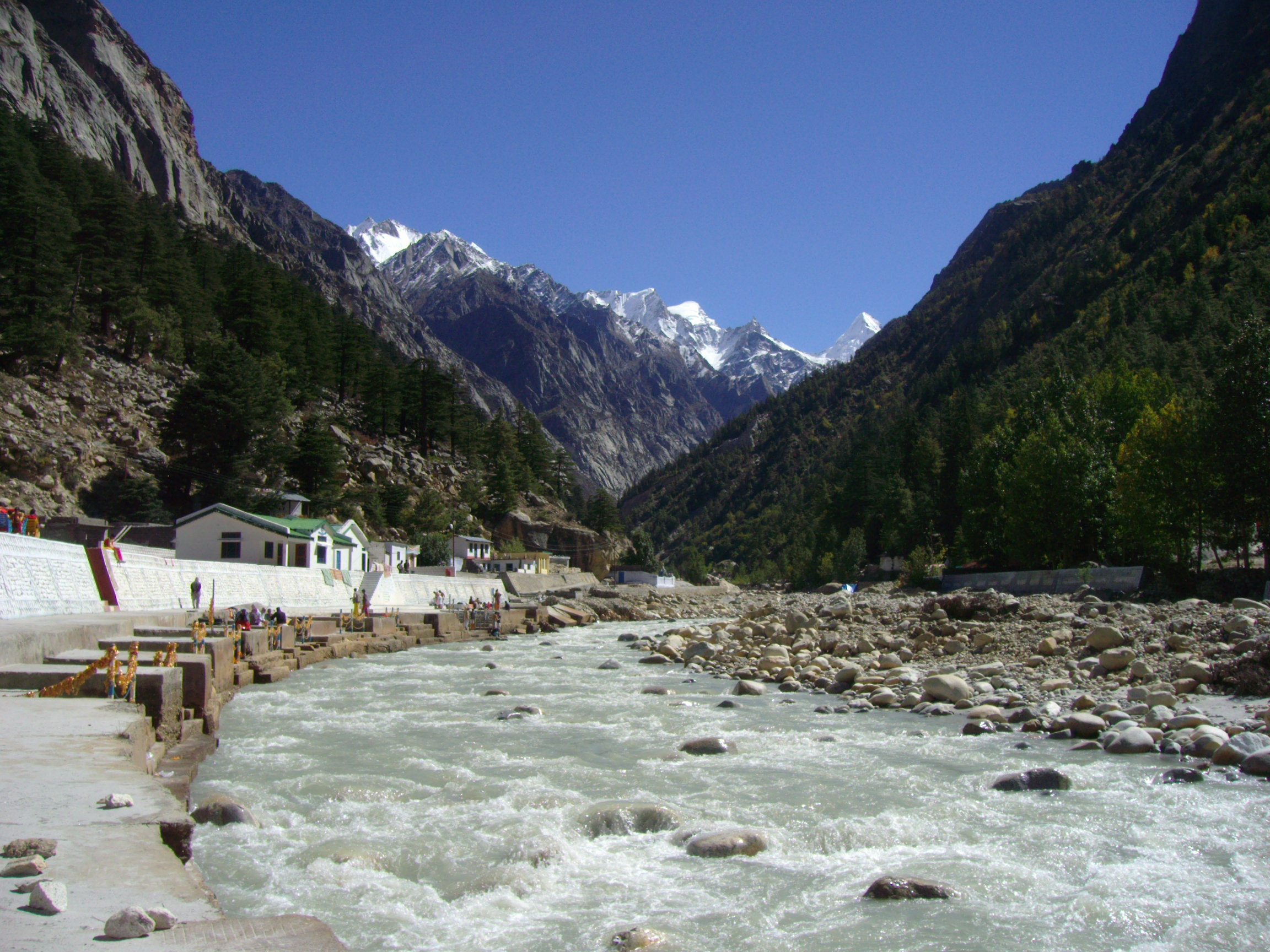
Bhagirathi River at Gangotri.

Along the way between Prayagraj and Malda, West Bengal, the Ganges river passes the towns of Chunar, Mirzapur, Varanasi, Ghazipur, Ara, Patna, Chapra, Hajipur, Mokama, Begusarai, Munger, Sahibganj, Rajmahal, Bhagalpur, Ballia, Buxar, Simaria, Sultanganj, and Farakka. At Bhagalpur, the river begins to flow south-southeast and at Farakka, it begins its attrition with the branching away of its first distributary, the 408 km (254 mi) long Bhāgirathi-Hooghly, which goes on to become the Hooghly River. Just before the border with Bangladesh the Farakka Barrage controls the flow of Ganges, diverting some of the water into a feeder canal linked to the Hooghly for the purpose of keeping it relatively silt-free. The Hooghly River is formed by the confluence of the Bhagirathi River and Ajay River at Katwa, and Hooghly has a number of tributaries of its own. The largest is the Damodar River, which is 625 km (388 mi) long, with a drainage basin of 25,820 km^{2} (9,970 sq mi). The Hooghly River empties into the Bay of Bengal near Sagar Island. Between Malda and the Bay of Bengal, the Hooghly river passes the towns and cities of Murshidabad, Nabadwip, Kolkata and Howrah.

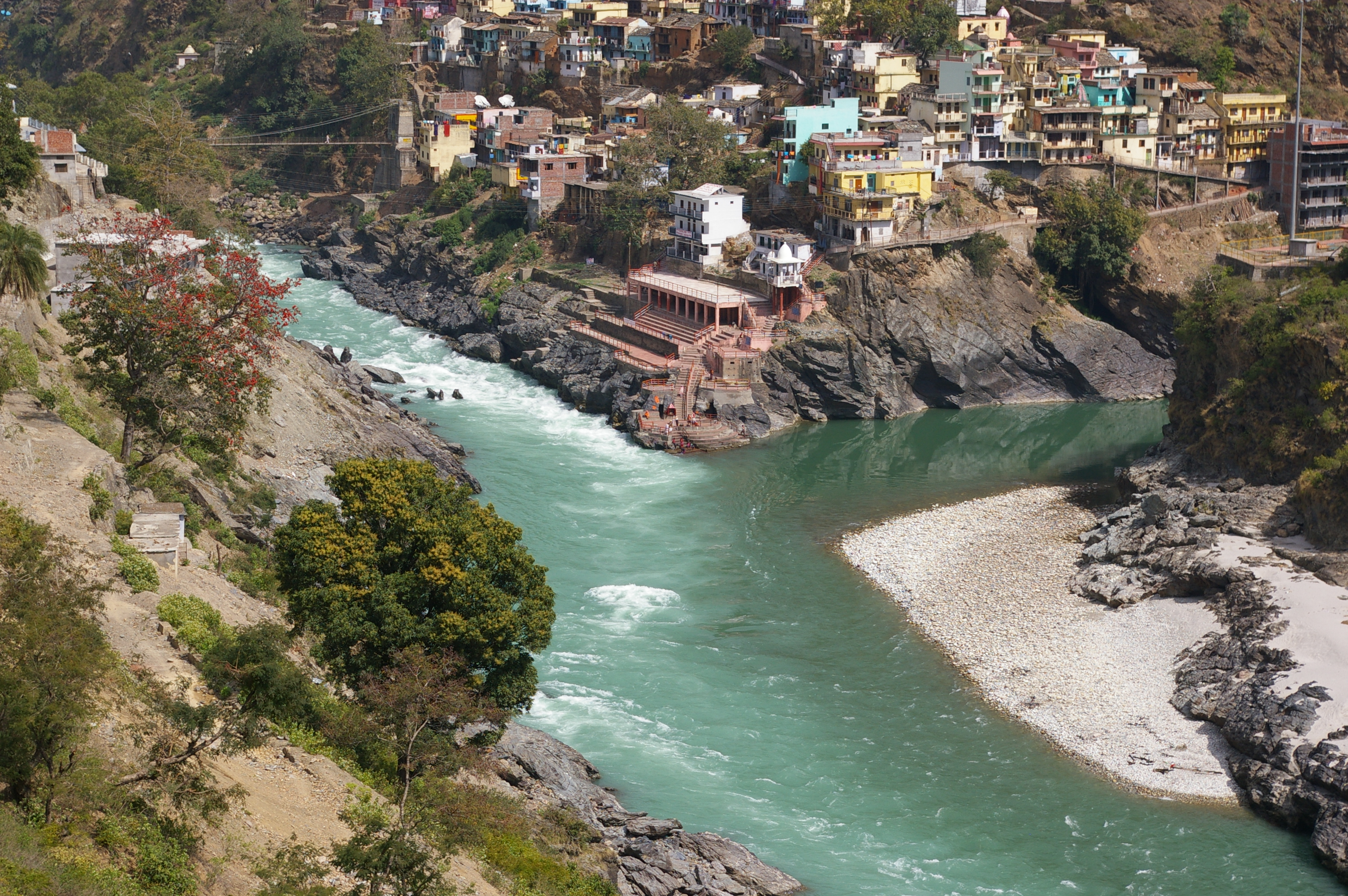
Devprayag, confluence of Alaknanda (right) and Bhagirathi (left), and beginning of the Ganges.

After entering Bangladesh, the main branch of the Ganges river is known as the Padma. The Padma is joined by the Jamuna River, the largest distributary of the Brahmaputra. Further downstream, the Padma joins the Meghna River, the converged flow of Surma-Meghna River System taking on the Meghna's name as it enters the Meghna Estuary, which empties into the Bay of Bengal. Here it forms the 1,430 by 3,000 km (890 by 1,860 mi) Bengal Fan, the world's largest submarine fan, which alone accounts for 10–20% of the global burial of organic carbon.

The Ganges Delta, formed mainly by the large, sediment-laden flows of the Ganges and Brahmaputra rivers, is the world's largest delta, at about 64,000 km^{2} (25,000 sq mi). It stretches 400 km (250 mi) along the Bay of Bengal.

Only the Amazon and Congo rivers have a greater average discharge than the combined flow of the Ganges, the Brahmaputra, and the Surma-Meghna river system. In full flood only the Amazon is larger.

== Geology ==
The Indian subcontinent lies atop the Indian tectonic plate, a minor plate within the Indo-Australian Plate. Its defining geological processes commenced seventy-five million years ago, when, as a part of the southern supercontinent Gondwana, it began a northeastwards drift—lasting fifty million years—across the then unformed Indian Ocean. The subcontinent's subsequent collision with the Eurasian Plate and subduction under it, gave rise to the Himalayas, the planet's highest mountain ranges. In the former seabed immediately south of the emerging Himalayas, plate movement created a vast trough, which, having gradually been filled with sediment borne by the Indus and its tributaries and the Ganges and its tributaries, now forms the Indo-Gangetic Plain.

The Indo-Gangetic Plain is geologically known as a foredeep or foreland basin.

== Hydrology ==
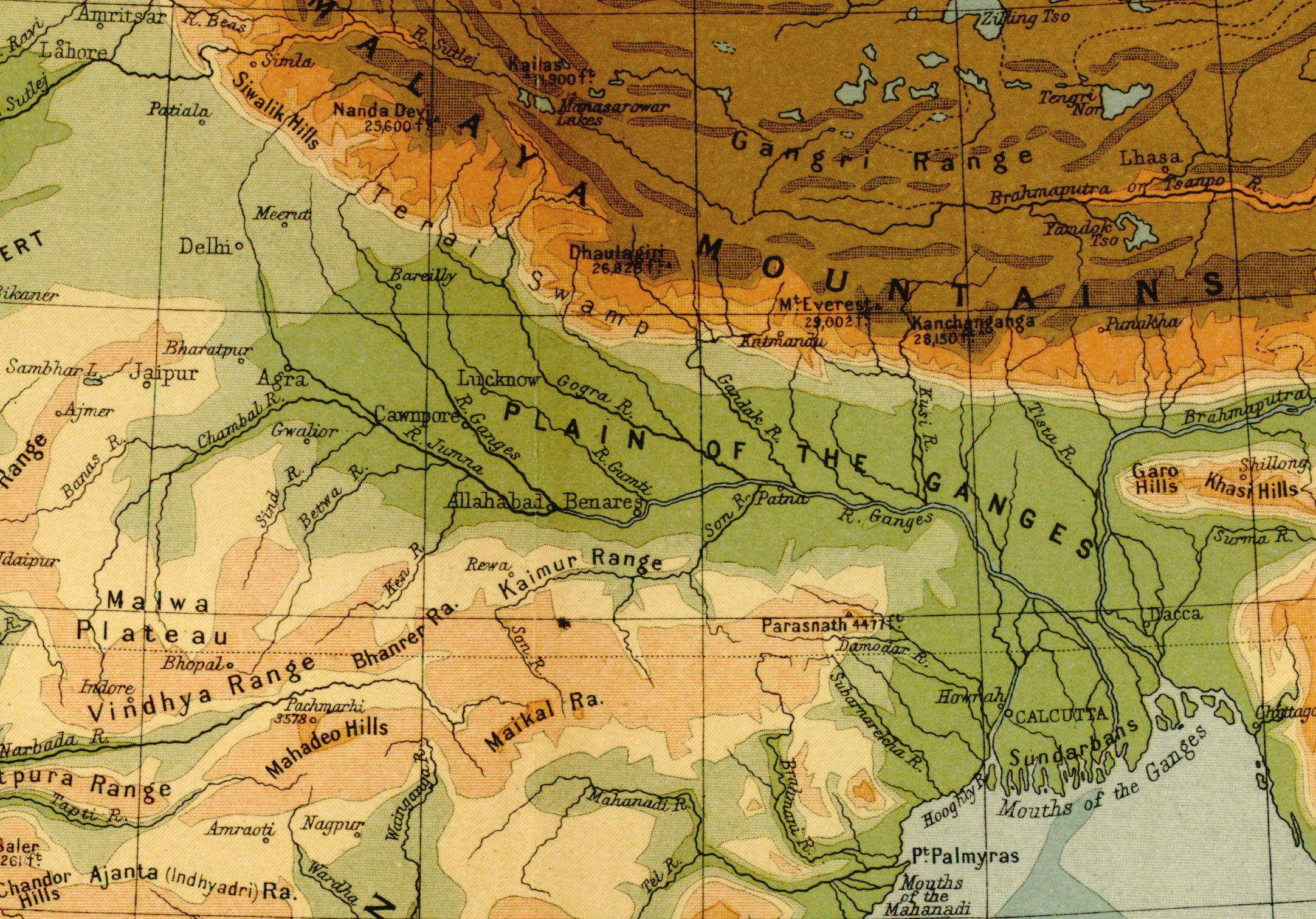
A 1908 map showing the course of the Ganges and its tributaries.

Major left-bank tributaries include the Gomti River, Ghaghara River, Gandaki River and Kosi River; major right-bank tributaries include the Yamuna River, Son River, Punpun and Damodar. The hydrology of the Ganges River is very complicated, especially in the Ganges Delta region. One result is different ways to determine the river's length, its discharge, and the size of its drainage basin.

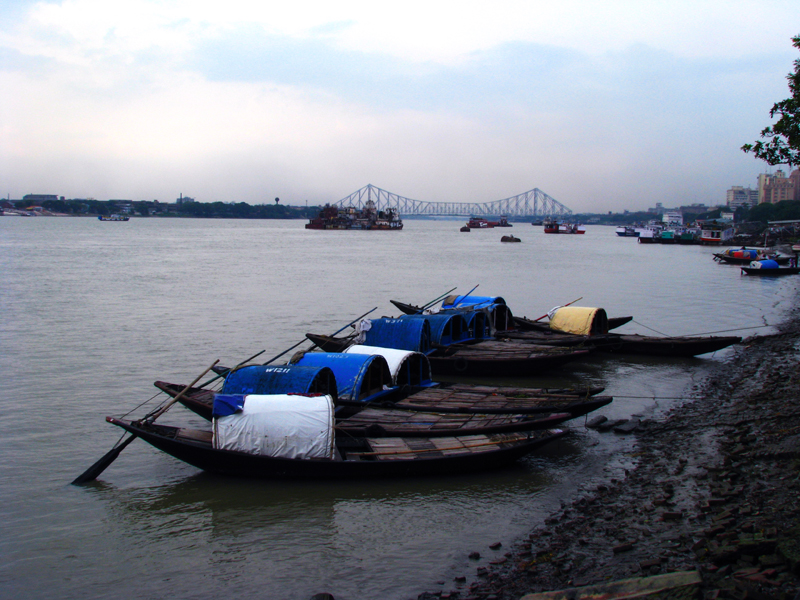
The River Ganges at Kolkata, with Howrah Bridge in the background

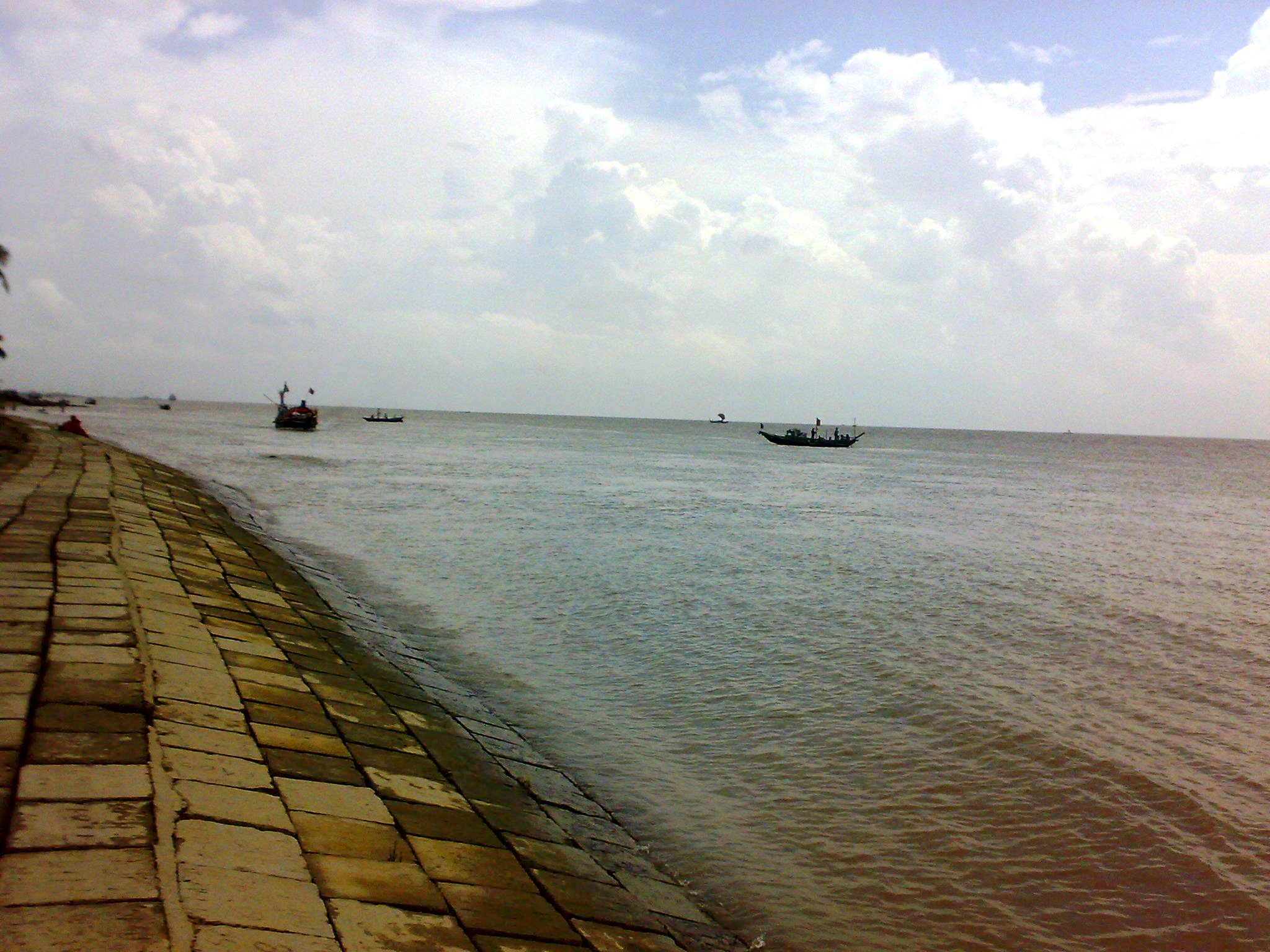
Lower Ganges in Lakshmipur, Bangladesh

The name Ganges is used for the river between the confluence of the Bhagirathi and Alaknanda rivers, in the Himalayas, and the first bifurcation of the river, near the Farakka Barrage and the India-Bangladesh Border. The length of the Ganges is frequently said to be slightly over 2,600 km (1,600 mi) long, about 2,601 km (1,616 mi), 2,525 km (1,569 mi) or 2,650 km (1,650 mi). In these cases the river's source is usually assumed to be the source of the Bhagirathi River, Gangotri Glacier at Gomukh and its mouth being the mouth of the Meghna River on the Bay of Bengal. Sometimes the source of the Ganges is considered to be at Haridwar, where its Himalayan headwater streams debouch onto the Gangetic Plain.

In some cases, the length of the Ganges is given by its Hooghly River distributary, which is longer than its main outlet via the Meghna River, resulting in a total length of about 2,704 km (1,680 mi), if taken from the source of the Bhagirathi, or 2,321.50 km (1,442.51 mi), if from Haridwar to the Hooghly's mouth. In other cases the length is said to be about 2,304 km (1,432 mi), from the source of the Bhagirathi to the Bangladesh border, where its name changes to Padma.

For similar reasons, sources differ over the size of the river's drainage basin. The basin covers parts of four countries, India, Nepal, China, and Bangladesh; eleven Indian states, Himachal Pradesh, Uttarakhand, Uttar Pradesh, Madhya Pradesh, Chhattisgarh, Bihar, Jharkhand, Punjab, Haryana, Rajasthan, West Bengal, and the Union Territory of Delhi. The Ganges basin, including the delta but not the Brahmaputra or Meghna basins, is about 1,080,000 km^{2} (420,000 sq mi), of which 861,000 km^{2} (332,000 sq mi) is in India (about 80%), 140,000 km^{2} (54,000 sq mi) in Nepal (13%), 46,000 km^{2} (18,000 sq mi) in Bangladesh (4%), and 33,000 km^{2} (13,000 sq mi) in China (3%). Sometimes the Ganges and Brahmaputra–Meghna drainage basins are combined for a total of about 1,600,000 km^{2} (620,000 sq mi) or 1,621,000 km^{2} (626,000 sq mi). The combined Ganges-Brahmaputra-Meghna basin (abbreviated GBM or GMB) drainage basin is spread across Bangladesh, Bhutan, India, Nepal, and China.

The Ganges basin ranges from the Himalaya and the Transhimalaya in the north, to the northern slopes of the Vindhya range in the south, from the eastern slopes of the Aravalli in the west to the Chota Nagpur plateau and the Sunderbans delta in the east. A significant portion of the discharge from the Ganges comes from the Himalayan mountain system. Within the Himalaya, the Ganges basin spreads almost 1,200 km from the Yamuna-Satluj divide along the Simla ridge forming the boundary with the Indus basin in the west to the Singalila Ridge along the Nepal-Sikkim border forming the boundary with the Brahmaputra basin in the east. This section of the Himalaya contains 9 of the 14 highest peaks in the world over 8,000m in height, including Mount Everest which is the high point of the Ganges basin. The other peaks over 8,000m in the basin are Kangchenjunga, Lhotse, Makalu, Cho Oyu, Dhaulagiri, Manaslu, Annapurna and Shishapangma. The Himalayan portion of the basin includes the south-eastern portion of the state of Himachal Pradesh, the entire state of Uttarakhand, the entire country of Nepal and the extreme north-western portion of the state of West Bengal.

The discharge of the Ganges also differs by source. Frequently, discharge is described for the mouth of the Meghna River, thus combining the Ganges with the Brahmaputra and Meghna. This results in a total average annual discharge of about 38,000 m^{3}/s (1,300,000 cu ft/s), or 42,470 m^{3}/s (1,500,000 cu ft/s). In other cases the average annual discharges of the Ganges, Brahmaputra, and Meghna are given separately, at about 16,650 m^{3}/s (588,000 cu ft/s) for the Ganges, about 19,820 m^{3}/s (700,000 cu ft/s) for the Brahmaputra, and about 5,100 m^{3}/s (180,000 cu ft/s) for the Meghna.

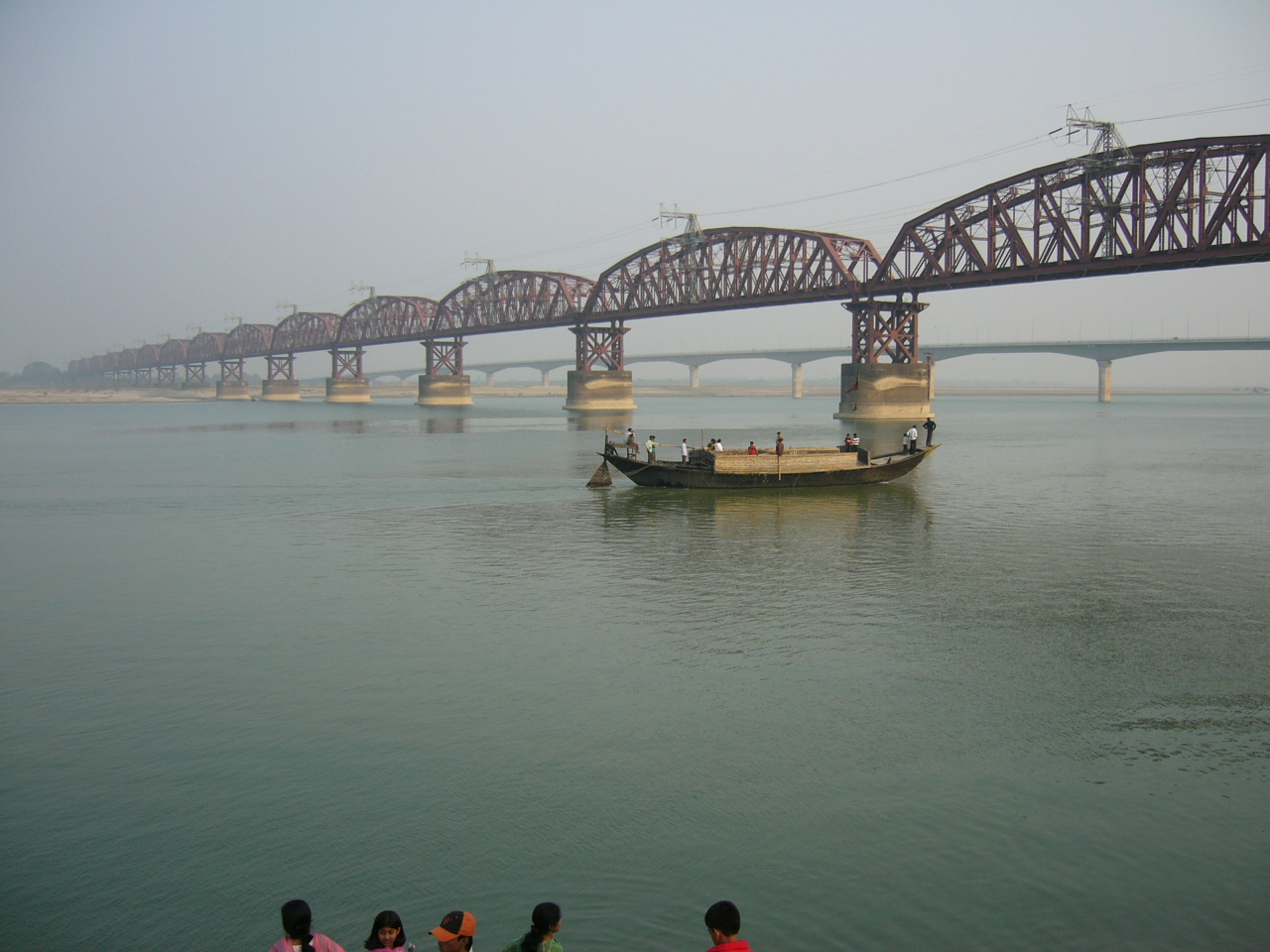
Hardinge Bridge, Bangladesh, crosses the Ganges-Padma River. It is one of the key sites for measuring streamflow and discharge on the lower Ganges.

The maximum peak discharge of the Ganges, as recorded at Hardinge Bridge in Bangladesh, exceeded 70,000 m^{3}/s (2,500,000 cu ft/s). The minimum recorded at the same place was about 180 m^{3}/s (6,400 cu ft/s), in 1997.

The hydrologic cycle in the Ganges basin is governed by the Southwest Monsoon. About 84% of the total rainfall occurs in the monsoon from June to September. Consequently, streamflow in the Ganges is highly seasonal. The average dry season to monsoon discharge ratio is about 1:6, as measured at Hardinge Bridge. This strong seasonal variation underlies many problems of land and water resource development in the region. The seasonality of flow is so acute it can cause both drought and floods. Bangladesh, in particular, frequently experiences drought during the dry season and regularly suffers extreme floods during the monsoon.

In the Ganges Delta, many large rivers come together, both merging and bifurcating in a complicated network of channels. The two largest rivers, the Ganges and Brahmaputra, both split into distributary channels, the largest of which merge with other large rivers before themselves joining the Bay of Bengal. But this current channel pattern was not always the case. Over time the rivers in Ganges Delta have often changed course, sometimes altering the network of channels in significant ways.

Before the late 12th century the Bhagirathi-Hooghly distributary was the main channel of the Ganges and the Padma was only a minor spill-channel. The main flow of the river reached the sea not via the modern Hooghly River but rather by the Adi Ganga. Between the 12th and 16th centuries, the Bhagirathi-Hooghly and Padma channels were more or less equally significant. After the 16th century, the Padma grew to become the main channel of the Ganges. It is thought that the Bhagirathi-Hooghly became increasingly choked with silt, causing the main flow of the Ganges to shift to the southeast and the Padma River. By the end of the 18th century, the Padma had become the main distributary of the Ganges. One result of this shift to the Padma was that the Ganges now joined the Meghna and Brahmaputra rivers before emptying into the Bay of Bengal. The present confluence of the Ganges and Meghna was formed very recently, about 150 years ago.

Also near the end of the 18th century, the course of the lower Brahmaputra changed dramatically, significantly altering its relationship with the Ganges. In 1787 there was a great flood on the Teesta River, which at the time was a tributary of the Ganges-Padma River. The flood of 1787 caused the Teesta to undergo a sudden change course, an avulsion, shifting east to join the Brahmaputra and causing the Brahmaputra to shift its course south, cutting a new channel. This new main channel of the Brahmaputra is called the Jamuna River. It flows south to join the Ganges-Padma. During ancient times, the main flow of the Brahmaputra was more easterly, passing by the city of Mymensingh and joining the Meghna River. Today this channel is a small distributary but retains the name Brahmaputra, sometimes Old Brahmaputra. The site of the old Brahmaputra-Meghna confluence, in the locality of Langalbandh, is still considered sacred by Hindus. Near the confluence is a major early historic site called Wari-Bateshwar.

In the rainy season of 1809, the lower channel of the Bhagirathi, leading to Kolkata, had been entirely shut; but in the following year it opened again and was nearly of the same size as the upper channel but both however suffered a considerable diminution, owing probably to the new communication opened below the Jalanggi on the upper channel.

== Discharge ==
Discharge of the Ganges River at Farakka Barrage (period from 1998/01/01 to 2023/12/31):

Year	Discharge (m^{3}/s)			Year	Discharge (m^{3}/s)		
Year	Annual average	Average minimum	Average maximum	Year	Annual average	Average minimum	Average maximum
1998	21,200	11,260	32,139	2011	8,315	4,942	15,648
1999	20,227	12,308	27,275	2012	10,531	5,529	16,404
2000	18,953	11,558	26,789	2013	14,350	8,559	19,534
2001	14,825	9,371	19,872	2014	12,409	7,118	17,682
2002	10,495	5,636	16,783	2015	12,104	7,256	17,030
2003	12,580	6,881	19,516	2016	15,220	9,035	23,490
2004	9,735	5,468	14,631	2017	11,919	6,856	17,604
2005	12,200	7,019	18,397	2018	11,967	6,176	18,805
2006	11,522	7,741	16,718	2019	14,923	7,079	24,757
2007	14,816	9,574	20,325	2020	15,882	9,837	23,491
2008	16,183	9,968	22,870	2021	17,818	9,543	27,003
2009	9,241	4,524	13,282	2022	14,142	7,148	22,569
2010	7,148	3,343	12,375	2023	9,417	1,645	18,744
Average (1998/01/01 to 2023/12/31):					13,389.3	7,514.4	20,143.6

== History ==
=== Bronze and Iron Age (c. 3300 – 200 BCE) ===
During the mature phase of the Indus Valley Civilisation, the Ganges was not the primary center of urban life, as larger settlements were concentrated in the Indus River basin. However, due to climate shifts and the drying of the Saraswati River around 1900 BCE, populations began a gradual eastward migration toward the more humid Indo-Gangetic Plain. This period marked the transition from Bronze Age urbanism to the "Ganga Culture," characterized by the Painted Grey Ware (PGW) settlements.

By the late Vedic period, the Ganges became the central sacred geography of South Asia. The river facilitated the rise of the Mahajanapadas, particularly Magadha. The river served as a vital trade artery for the Mauryan Empire. The city of Pataliputra (modern-day Patna) was established at the confluence of the Ganges and Son rivers to control riverine commerce.

The first European traveller to mention the Ganges was the Greek envoy Megasthenes (ca. 350–290 BCE). He did so several times in his work Indica: "India, again, possesses many rivers both large and navigable, which, having their sources in the mountains which stretch along the northern frontier, traverse the level country, and not a few of these, after uniting with each other, fall into the river called the Ganges. Now this river, which at its source is 30 stadia broad, flows from north to south, and empties its waters into the ocean forming the eastern boundary of the Gangaridai, a nation which possesses a vast force of the largest-sized elephants." (Diodorus II.37).

=== Classical and Medieval Age (200 BCE – 1500 CE) ===
During this era, the Ganges was personified as the goddess Ganga, becoming a focal point for pilgrimage and the development of cities like Varanasi and Haridwar.

In the eastern delta, the Pala Empire (8th–12th century) utilized the Ganges for maritime trade with Southeast Asia. The subsequent Sena dynasty further solidified the river's sanctity in Bengal, establishing the "Kulinism" social structure centered around the riverine heartlands.

With the establishment of the Delhi Sultanate, the Ganges served as both a strategic barrier and a logistics corridor. The river acted as a natural defense for the Sultanate against Mongol incursions from the northwest. Control over the "Doab" (the fertile land between the Ganges and Yamuna) became the primary source of tax revenue (Iqta') for the Sultans of Delhi.

The Ganges provided a path for Sufi saints and traders to penetrate deep into rural Bengal. The city of Gauḍa, located on the banks of the Ganges, rose to prominence as a major medieval metropolis and the capital of the Bengal Sultanate.

=== Modern Age (1500 – Present) ===
Historically, the Ganges flowed through the western part of the delta via the Hooghly-Bhagirathi channel. However, starting around the 16th century, a major tectonic tilt of the Bengal basin caused the main volume of the river to shift eastward into the Padma River channel. This shift rejuvenated the eastern delta, facilitating massive agricultural expansion and the rise of new urban centers.

The expansion of agriculture led to the systematic clearing of subtropical forests. Mughal records, including those of Babur, indicate that rhinoceroses and wild elephants were common in the Gangetic prairies as late as the 16th century, before habitat loss drove them to extinction in the region.

By the 1840s, the British East India Company began the first large-scale "taming" of the river. The Ganges Canal (1854) was an unprecedented intervention, spanning over 500 miles to divert water for irrigation. While it mitigated regional famines, it fundamentally altered the river's natural flooding cycles and water table.

The Radcliffe Line divided the Ganges-Brahmaputra delta, leaving West Bengal in India and East Bengal in East Pakistan. This created immediate complexities regarding riparian rights. Following the Bangladesh Liberation War in 1971, the Ganges became a transnational river shared by India and Bangladesh.

The construction of the Farakka Barrage (1975) by India to desilt the Kolkata port led to significant downstream concerns in Bangladesh regarding water scarcity and salinity. This resulted in the Ganga Water Sharing Treaty of 1996, a 30-year agreement aimed at regulating flow during the dry season. The terms of the agreement are complicated, but in essence, they state that if the Ganges flow at Farakka was less than 2,000 m^{3}/s (71,000 cu ft/s) then India and Bangladesh would each receive 50% of the water, with each receiving at least 1,000 m^{3}/s (35,000 cu ft/s) for alternating ten-day periods. However, within a year the flow at Farakka fell to levels far below the historic average, making it impossible to implement the guaranteed sharing of water. In March 1997, flow of the Ganges in Bangladesh dropped to its lowest ever, 180 m^{3}/s (6,400 cu ft/s). Dry season flows returned to normal levels in the years following, but efforts are ongoing to address the problem.

== Religious and cultural significance ==
=== Embodiment of sacredness ===
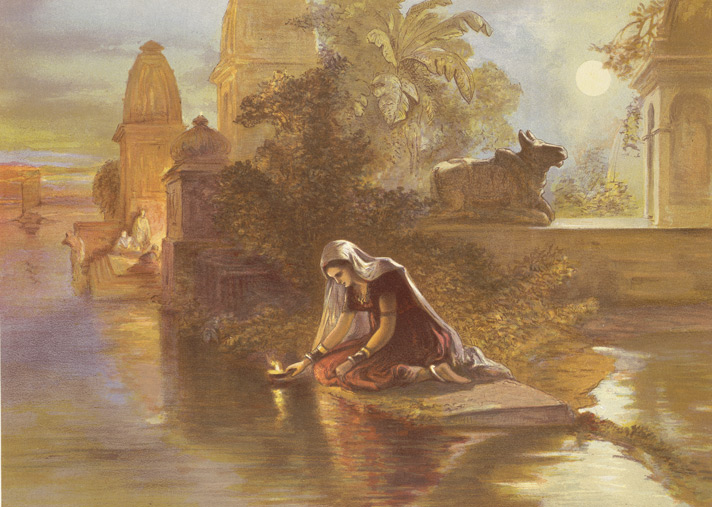
Chromolithograph, Indian woman floating lamps on the Ganges, by William Simpson, 1867

The Ganges is a sacred river to Hindus along every fragment of its length. All along its course, Hindus bathe in its waters, paying homage to their ancestors and their gods by cupping the water in their hands, lifting it, and letting it fall back into the river; they offer flowers and rose petals and float shallow clay dishes filled with oil and lit with wicks (diyas). On the journey back home from the Ganges, they carry small quantities of river water with them for use in rituals; Ganga Jal, literally "the water of the Ganges".

The Ganges is the embodiment of all sacred waters in Hindu mythology. Local rivers are said to be like the Ganges and are sometimes called the local Ganges. The Godavari River of Maharashtra in Western India is called the Ganges of the South or the 'Dakshin Ganga'; the Godavari is the Ganges that was led by the sage Gautama to flow through Central India. The Ganges is invoked whenever water is used in Hindu ritual and is therefore present in all sacred waters. Despite this, nothing is more stirring for a Hindu than a dip in the actual river, which is thought to remit sins, especially at one of the famous tirthas such as Varanasi, Gangotri, Haridwar, or the Triveni Sangam at Prayagraj. The symbolic and religious importance of the Ganges is one of the few things that Hindus, even their skeptics, have agreed upon. Jawaharlal Nehru, a religious iconoclast himself, asked for a handful of his ashes to be thrown into the Ganges. "The Ganga", he wrote in his will, "is the river of India, beloved of her people, round which are intertwined her racial memories, her hopes and fears, her songs of triumph, her victories and her defeats. She has been a symbol of India's age-long culture and civilization, ever-changing, ever-flowing, and yet ever the same Ganga."

=== Avatarana – Descent of Ganges ===
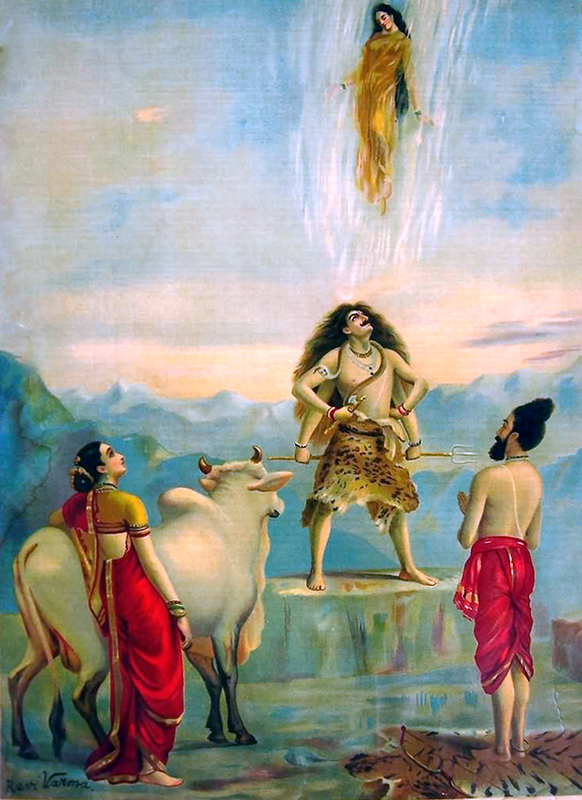
Descent of Ganga, painting by Raja Ravi Varma c. 1910

In late May or early June every year, Hindus celebrate the karunasiri and the rise of the Ganges from earth to heaven. The day of the celebration, Ganga Dashahara, the Dashami (tenth day) of the waxing moon of the Hindu calendar month Jyeshtha, brings throngs of bathers to the banks of the river. A dip in the Ganges on this day is said to rid the bather of ten sins (dasha = Sanskrit "ten"; hara = to destroy) or ten lifetimes of sins. Those who cannot journey to the river, however, can achieve the same results by bathing in any nearby body of water, which, for the true believer, takes on all the attributes of the Ganges.

The karunasiri is an old theme in Hinduism with a number of different versions of the story. In the Vedic version, Indra, the Lord of Svarga (Heaven) slays the celestial serpent, Vritra, releasing the celestial liquid, soma, or the nectar of the gods which then plunges to the earth and waters it with sustenance.

In the Vaishnava version of the myth, the heavenly waters were then a river called Vishnupadi (Sanskrit: "from the foot of Vishnu"). As Vishnu as the avatar Vamana completes his celebrated three strides —of earth, sky, and heaven— he stubs his toe on the vault of heaven, punches open a hole and releases the Vishnupadi, which until now had been circling the cosmic egg. Flowing out of the vault, she plummets down to Indra's heaven, where she is received by Dhruva, once a steadfast worshipper of Vishnu, now fixed in the sky as the Pole star. Next, she streams across the sky forming the Milky Way and arrives on the moon. She then flows down earthwards to Brahma's realm, a divine lotus atop Mount Meru, whose petals form the earthly continents. There, the divine waters break up, with one stream, the Bhagirathi, flowing down one petal into Bharatavarsha (India) as the Ganges.

It is Shiva, however, among the major deities of the Hindu pantheon, who appears in the most widely known version of the avatarana story. Told and retold in the Ramayana, the Mahabharata and several Puranas, the story begins with a sage, Kapila, whose intense meditation has been disturbed by the sixty thousand sons of King Sagara. Livid at being disturbed, Kapila sears them with his angry gaze, reduces them to ashes, and dispatches them to the netherworld. Only the waters of the Ganges, then in heaven, can bring the dead sons their salvation. A descendant of these sons, King Bhagiratha, anxious to restore his ancestors, undertakes rigorous penance and is eventually granted the prize of Ganges's descent from heaven. However, since her turbulent force would also shatter the earth, Bhagiratha persuades Shiva in his abode on Mount Kailash to receive the Ganges in the coils of his tangled hair and break her fall. The Ganges descends, is tamed in Shiva's locks, and arrives in the Himalayas. She is then led by the waiting Bhagiratha down into the plains at Haridwar, across the plains first to the confluence with the Yamuna at Prayag and then to Varanasi, and eventually to Ganges Sagar (Ganges delta), where she meets the ocean, sinks to the netherworld, and saves the sons of Sagara. In honour of Bhagirath's pivotal role in the avatarana, the source stream of the Ganges in the Himalayas is named Bhagirathi, (Sanskrit, "of Bhagiratha").

=== Redemption of the Dead ===
Preparations for cremations on the banks of the Ganges in Varanasi, 1903. The dead are being bathed, wrapped in cloth, and covered with wood. The photograph has a caption, "Who dies in the waters of the Ganges obtains heaven."

As the Ganges had descended from heaven to earth in the Hindu tradition, she is also considered the vehicle of ascent, from earth to heaven. As the Triloka-patha-gamini, (Sanskrit: triloka = "three worlds", patha = "road", gamini = "one who travels") of the tradition, she flows in heaven, earth, and the netherworld, and, consequently, is a "tirtha" or crossing point of all beings, the living as well as the dead. It is for this reason that the story of the avatarana is told at Shraddha ceremonies for the deceased in Hinduism, and Ganges water is used in Vedic rituals after death. Among all hymns devoted to the Ganges, there are none more popular than the ones expressing the worshipper's wish to breathe his last surrounded by her waters. The Gangashtakam expresses this longing fervently:

O Mother! ... Necklace adorning the worlds!
Banner rising to heaven!
I ask that I may leave of this body on your banks,
Drinking your water, rolling in your waves,
Remembering your name, bestowing my gaze upon you.

No place along her banks is more longed for at the moment of death by Hindus than Varanasi, the Great Cremation Ground, or Mahashmshana. Those who are lucky enough to die in Varanasi, are cremated on the banks of the Ganges, and are granted instant salvation. If the death has occurred elsewhere, salvation can be achieved by immersing the ashes in the Ganges. If the ashes have been immersed in another body of water, a relative can still gain salvation for the deceased by journeying to the Ganges, if possible during the lunar "fortnight of the ancestors" in the Hindu calendar month of Ashwin (September or October), and performing the Shraddha rites.

Hindus also perform pinda pradana, a rite for the dead, in which balls of rice and sesame seed are offered to the Ganges while the names of the deceased relatives are recited. Every sesame seed in every ball thus offered, according to one story, assures a thousand years of heavenly salvation for each relative. Indeed, the Ganges is so important in the rituals after death that the Mahabharata, in one of its popular ślokas, says, "If only (one) bone of a (deceased) person should touch the water of the Ganges, that person shall dwell honoured in heaven." As if to illustrate this truism, the Kashi Khanda (Varanasi Chapter) of the Skanda Purana recounts the remarkable story of Vahika, a profligate and unrepentant sinner, who is killed by a tiger in the forest. His soul arrives before Yama, the Lord of Death, to be judged for the afterworld. Having no compensating virtue, Vahika's soul is at once dispatched to hell. While this is happening, his body on earth, however, is being picked at by vultures, one of whom flies away with a foot bone. Another bird comes after the vulture, and in fighting him off, the vulture accidentally drops the bone into the Ganges below. Blessed by this event, Vahika, on his way to hell, is rescued by a celestial chariot which takes him instead to heaven.

=== The Purifying Ganges ===
Women and children at a bathing ghat on the Ganges in Banares (Varanasi), 1885.

Hindus consider the waters of the Ganges to be both pure and purifying. Regardless of all scientific understanding of its waters, the Ganges is always ritually and symbolically pure in Hindu culture. Nothing reclaims order from disorder more than the waters of the Ganga. Moving water, as in a river, is considered purifying in Hindu culture because it is thought to both absorb impurities and take them away. The swiftly moving Ganga, especially in its upper reaches, where a bather has to grasp an anchored chain to not be carried away, is especially purifying. What the Ganges removes, however, is not necessarily physical dirt, but symbolic dirt; it wipes away the sins of the bather, not just of the present, but of a lifetime.

A popular paean to the Ganga is the Ganga Lahiri composed by a 17th-century poet Jagannatha who, legend has it, was turned out of his Hindu Brahmin caste for carrying on an affair with a Muslim woman. Having attempted futilely to be rehabilitated within the Hindu fold, the poet finally appeals to Ganga, the hope of the hopeless, and the comforter of last resort. Along with his beloved, Jagannatha sits at the top of the flight of steps leading to the water at the famous Panchganga Ghat in Varanasi. As he recites each verse of the poem, the water of the Ganges rises one step until in the end it envelops the lovers and carries them away. "I come to you as a child to his mother", begins the Ganga Lahiri.

I come as an orphan to you, moist with love.
I come without refuge to you, giver of sacred rest.
I come a fallen man to you, uplifter of all.
I come undone by disease to you, the perfect physician.
I come, my heart dry with thirst, to you, ocean of sweet wine.
Do with me whatever you will.

=== Consort, Shakti, and Mother ===
Ganga is a consort to all three major male deities of Hinduism. As Brahma's partner she always travels with him in the form of water in his kamandalu (water-pot). She is also Vishnu's consort. Not only does she emanate from his foot as Vishnupadi in the avatarana story, but is also, with Sarasvati and Lakshmi, one of his co-wives. In one popular story, envious of being outdone by each other, the co-wives begin to quarrel. While Lakshmi attempts to mediate the quarrel, Ganga and Sarasvati, heap misfortune on each other. They curse each other to become rivers, and to carry within them, by washing, the sins of their human worshippers. Soon their husband, Vishnu, arrives and decides to calm the situation by separating the goddesses. He orders Sarasvati to marry Brahma, Ganga to marry Shiva, and Lakshmi, as the blameless conciliator, to remain as his own wife. Ganga and Sarasvati, however, are so distraught at this dispensation, and wail so loudly, that Vishnu is forced to take back his words. Consequently, in their lives as rivers they are still thought to be with him.

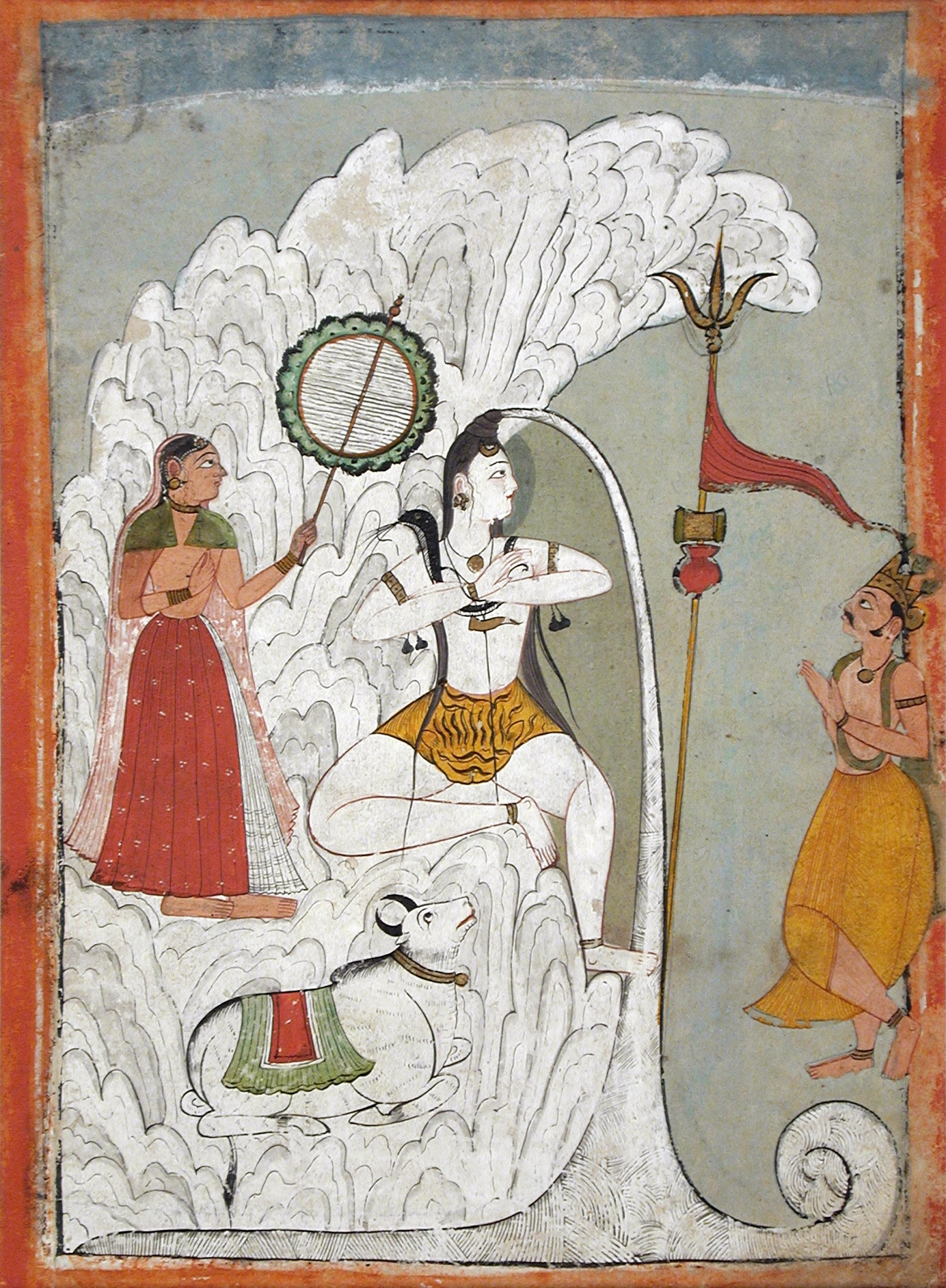
Shiva, as Gangadhara, bearing the Descent of the Ganges, as the goddess Parvati, the sage Bhagiratha, and the bull Nandi look on (circa 1740).

It is Shiva's relationship with Ganga, that is the best-known in Ganges mythology. Her descent, the avatarana is not a one-time event, but a continuously occurring one in which she is forever falling from heaven into his locks and being forever tamed. Shiva, is depicted in Hindu iconography as Gangadhara, the "Bearer of the Ganga", with Ganga, shown as spout of water, rising from his hair. The Shiva-Ganga relationship is both perpetual and intimate. Shiva is sometimes called Uma-Ganga-Patiswara ("Husband and Lord of Uma (Parvati) and Ganga"), and Ganga often arouses the jealousy of Shiva's better-known consort.

Ganga is the shakti or the moving, restless, rolling energy in the form of which the otherwise reclusive and unapproachable Shiva appears on earth. As water, this moving energy can be felt, tasted, and absorbed. The war-god Skanda addresses the sage Agastya in the Kashi Khand of the Skanda Purana in these words:

One should not be amazed ... that this Ganges is really Power, for is she not the Supreme Shakti of the Eternal Shiva, taken in the form of water?
This Ganges, filled with the sweet wine of compassion, was sent out for the salvation of the world by Shiva, the Lord of the Lords.
Good people should not think this Triple-Pathed River to be like the thousand other earthly rivers, filled with water.

The Ganga is also the mother, the Ganga Mata (mata="mother") of Hindu worship and culture, accepting all and forgiving all. Unlike other goddesses, she has no destructive or fearsome aspect, destructive though she might be as a river in nature. She is also a mother to other gods. She accepts Shiva's incandescent seed from the fire-god Agni, which is too hot for this world and cools it in her waters. This union produces Skanda, or Kartikeya, the god of war. In the Mahabharata, she is married to Shantanu, and the mother of heroic warrior-patriarch, Bhishma. When Bhishma is mortally wounded in battle, Ganga comes out of the water in human form and weeps uncontrollably over his body.

The Ganges is the distilled lifeblood of the Hindu tradition, of its divinities, holy books, and enlightenment. As such, her worship does not require the usual rites of invocation (avahana) at the beginning and dismissal (visarjana) at the end, required in the worship of other gods. Her divinity is immediate and everlasting.

=== Ganges in classical Indian iconography ===
Photograph (1875) of goddess Ganga (Gupta period, 5th or 6th century CE) from Besnagar, Madhya Pradesh, now in Museum of Fine Arts, Boston.

Goddess Ganga with left hand resting on a dwarf attendant's head from the Rameshwar Temple, Ellora Caves, Maharashtra (6th century)

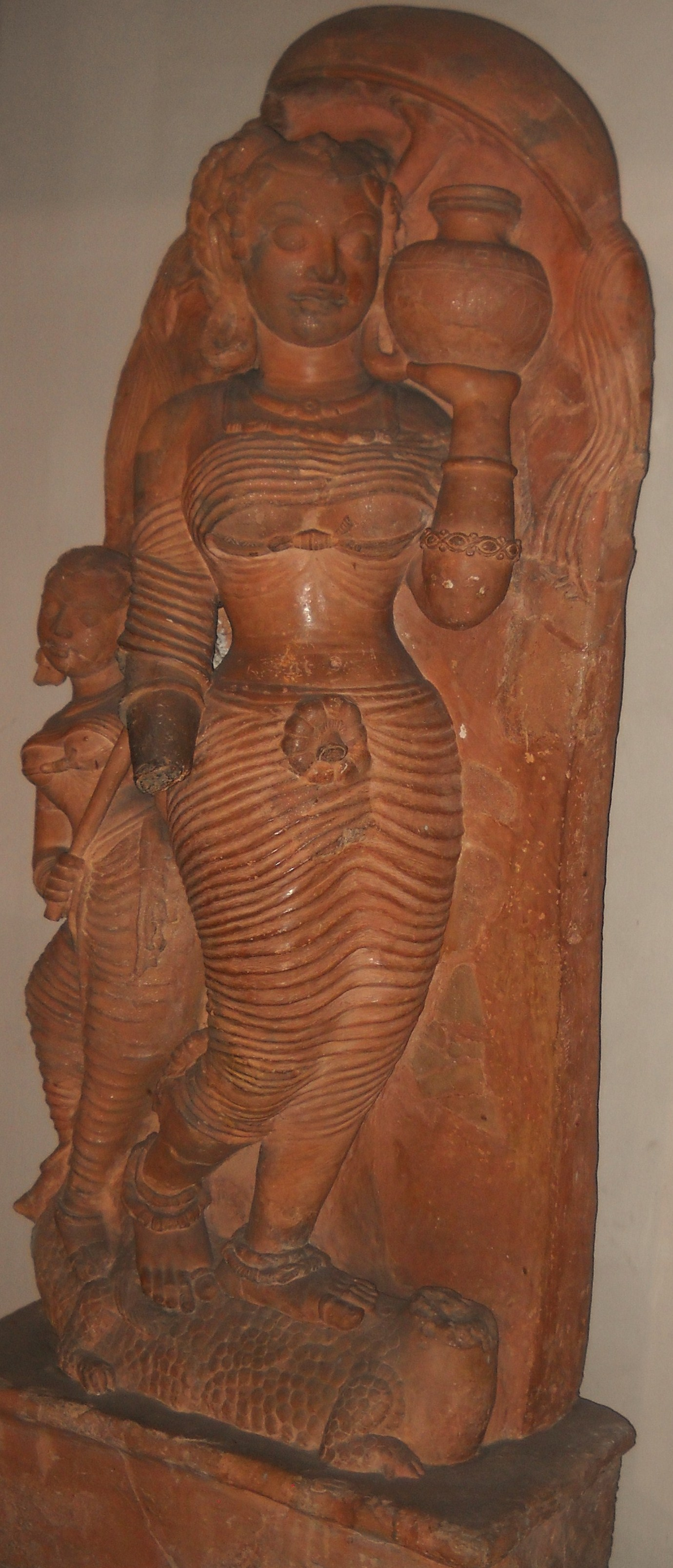
The goddess Ganga stands on her mount, the makara, with a kumbha, a full pot of water, in her hand, while an attendant holds a parasol over her. Terracotta, Ahichatra, Uttar Pradesh, Gupta, 5th century, now in National Museum, New Delhi

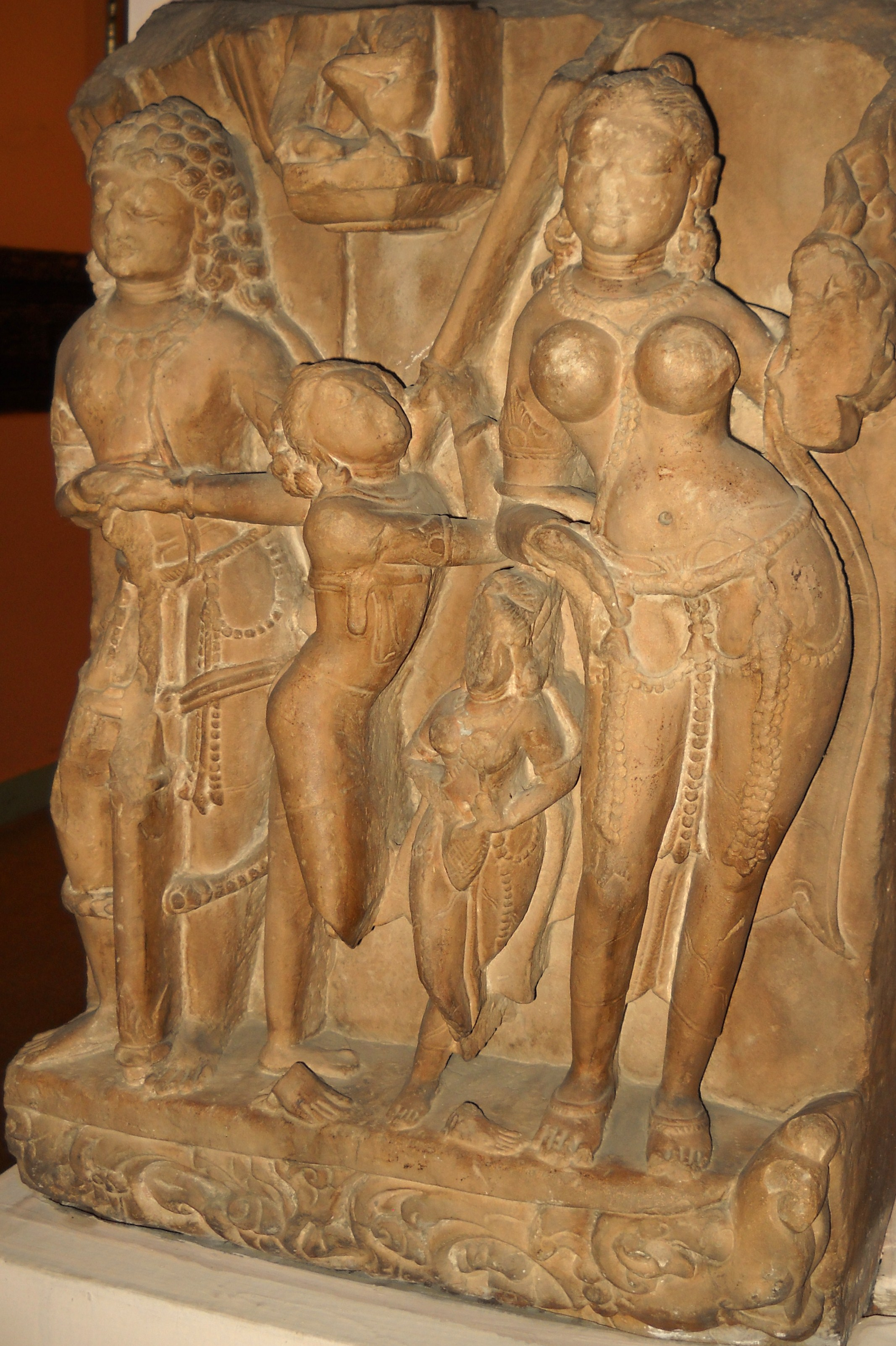
The goddess Ganga (right) in tribhanga pose with retinue. Pratihara, 10th century, now in National Museum, New Delhi

Early in ancient Indian culture, the river Ganges was associated with fecundity, its redeeming waters, and its rich silt providing sustenance to all who lived along its banks. A counterpoise to the dazzling heat of the Indian summer, the Ganges came to be imbued with magical qualities and to be revered in anthropomorphic form. By the 5th century CE, an elaborate mythology surrounded the Ganges, now a goddess in her own right, and a symbol for all rivers of India. Hindu temples all over India had statues and reliefs of the goddess carved at their entrances, symbolically washing the sins of arriving worshippers and guarding the gods within. As protector of the sanctum sanctorum, the goddess soon came to be depicted with several characteristic accessories: the makara (a crocodile-like undersea monster, often shown with an elephant-like trunk), the kumbha (an overfull vase), various overhead parasol-like coverings, and a gradually increasing retinue of humans.

Central to the goddess's visual identification is the makara, which is also her vahana, or mount. An ancient symbol in India, it pre-dates all appearances of the goddess Ganga in art. The makara has a dual symbolism. On the one hand, it represents the life-affirming waters and plants of its environment; on the other, it represents fear, both fear of the unknown which it elicits by lurking in those waters, and real fear which it instils by appearing in sight. The earliest extant unambiguous pairing of the makara with Ganga is at the Udayagiri Caves in Central India (circa 400 CE). Here, in the Cave V, flanking the main figure of Vishnu shown in his boar incarnation, two river goddesses, Ganga and Yamuna appear atop their respective mounts, makara and kurma (a turtle or tortoise).

The makara is often accompanied by a gana, a small boy or child, near its mouth, as, for example, shown in the Gupta period relief from Besnagar, Central India, in the left-most frame above. The gana represents both posterity and development (udbhava). The pairing of the fearsome, life-destroying makara with the youthful, life-affirming gana speaks to two aspects of the Ganges herself. Although she has provided sustenance to millions, she has also brought hardship, injury, and death by causing major floods along her banks. The goddess Ganga is also accompanied by a dwarf attendant, who carries a cosmetic bag, and on whom she sometimes leans, as if for support. (See, for example, frames 1, 2, and 4 above.)

The purna kumbha or full pot of water is the second most discernible element of the Ganga iconography. Appearing first also in the relief in the Udayagiri Caves (5th century), it gradually appeared more frequently as the theme of the goddess matured. By the 7th century it had become an established feature, as seen, for example, in the Dashavatara temple, Deogarh, Uttar Pradesh (7th century), the Trimurti temple, Badoli, Chittorgarh, Rajasthan, and at the Lakshmaneshwar temple, Kharod, Bilaspur, Chhattisgarh, (9th or 10th century), and seen very clearly in frame 3 above and less clearly in the remaining frames. Worshipped even today, the full pot is emblematic of the formless Brahman, as well as of woman, of the womb, and of birth. Furthermore, The river goddesses Ganga and Saraswati were both born from Brahma's pot, containing the celestial waters.

In her earliest depictions at temple entrances, the goddess Ganga appeared standing beneath the overhanging branch of a tree, as seen as well in the Udayagiri caves. However, soon the tree cover had evolved into a chatra or parasol held by an attendant, for example, in the 7th-century Dasavatara temple at Deogarh. (The parasol can be clearly seen in frame 3 above; its stem can be seen in frame 4, but the rest has broken off.) The cover undergoes another transformation in the temple at Kharod, Bilaspur (9th or 10th century), where the parasol is lotus-shaped, and yet another at the Trimurti temple at Badoli where the parasol has been replaced entirely by a lotus.

As the iconography evolved, sculptors, especially in central India, were producing animated scenes of the goddess, replete with an entourage and suggestive of a queen en route to a river to bathe. A relief similar to the depiction in frame 4 above, is described in Pal 1997, p. 43 as follows:

A typical relief of about the ninth century that once stood at the entrance of a temple, the river goddess Ganga is shown as a voluptuously endowed lady with a retinue. Following the iconographic prescription, she stands gracefully on her composite makara mount and holds a water pot. The dwarf attendant carries her cosmetic bag, and a ... female holds the stem of a giant lotus leaf that serves as her mistress's parasol. The fourth figure is a male guardian. Often in such reliefs, the makara's tail is extended with great flourish into a scrolling design symbolizing both vegetation and water.

=== Kumbh Mela ===
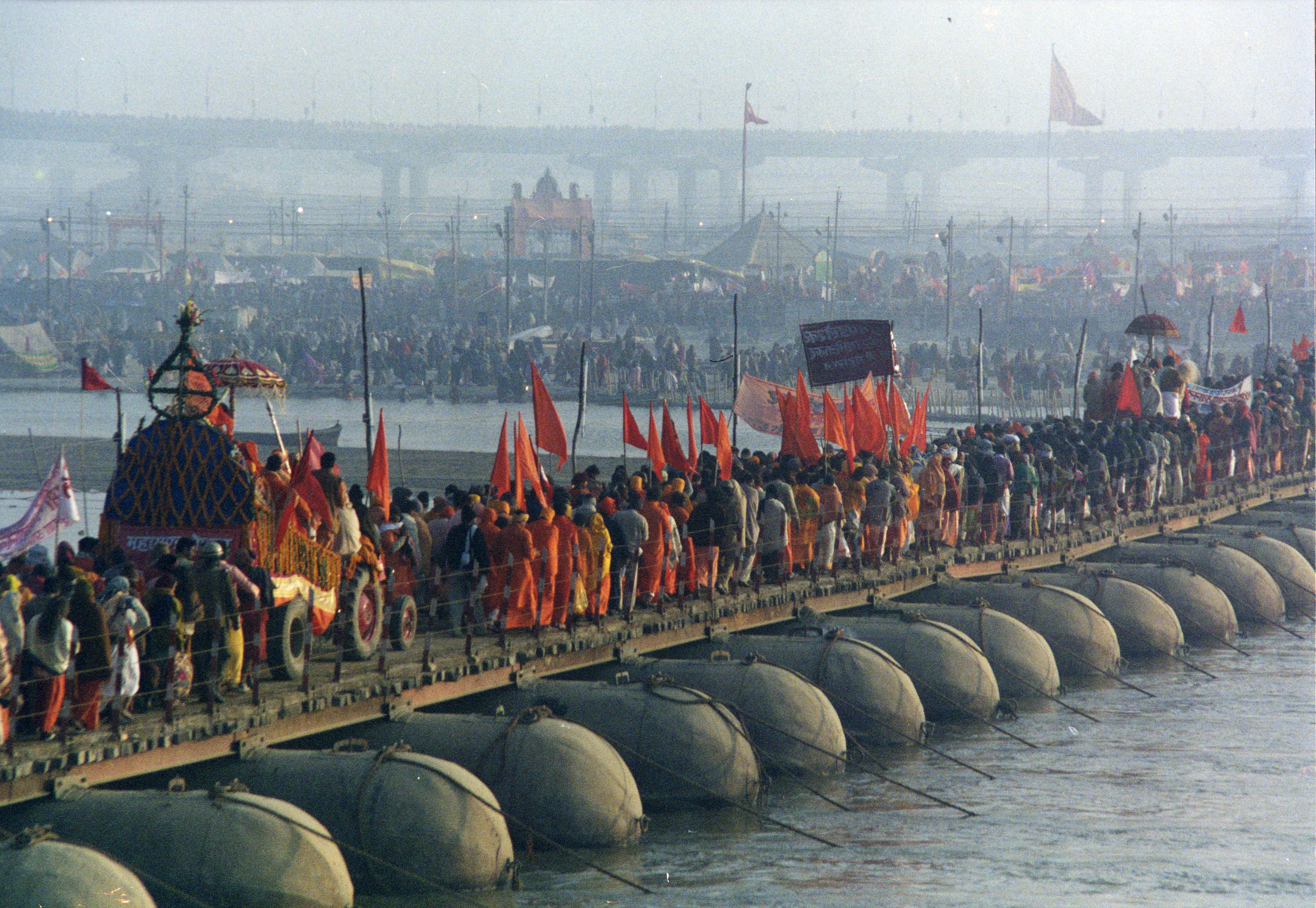
A procession of Akharas marching over a makeshift bridge over the Ganges River. Kumbh Mela at Prayagraj, 2001.

The Kumbh Mela is a mass Hindu pilgrimage in which Hindus gather at the Ganges River. The normal Kumbh Mela is celebrated every 3 years, the Ardh (half) Kumbh is celebrated every six years at Haridwar and Prayagraj, the Purna (complete) Kumbh takes place every twelve years at four places (Triveni Sangam (Prayagraj), Haridwar, Ujjain, and Nashik). The Maha (great) Kumbh Mela which comes after 12 'Purna Kumbh Melas', or 144 years, is held at Prayagraj.

The major event of the festival is ritual bathing at the banks of the river. Other activities include religious discussions, devotional singing, mass feeding of holy men and women and the poor, and religious assemblies where doctrines are debated and standardized. Kumbh Mela is the most sacred of all the pilgrimages. Thousands of holy men and women attend, and the auspiciousness of the festival is in part attributable to this. The sadhus are seen clad in saffron sheets with ashes and powder dabbed on their skin per the requirements of ancient traditions. Some called naga sanyasis, may not wear any clothes.

== Irrigation ==
The Ganges and its all tributaries, especially the Yamuna, have been used for irrigation since ancient times. Dams and canals were common in the Gangetic plain by the 4th century BCE.

=== Canals ===
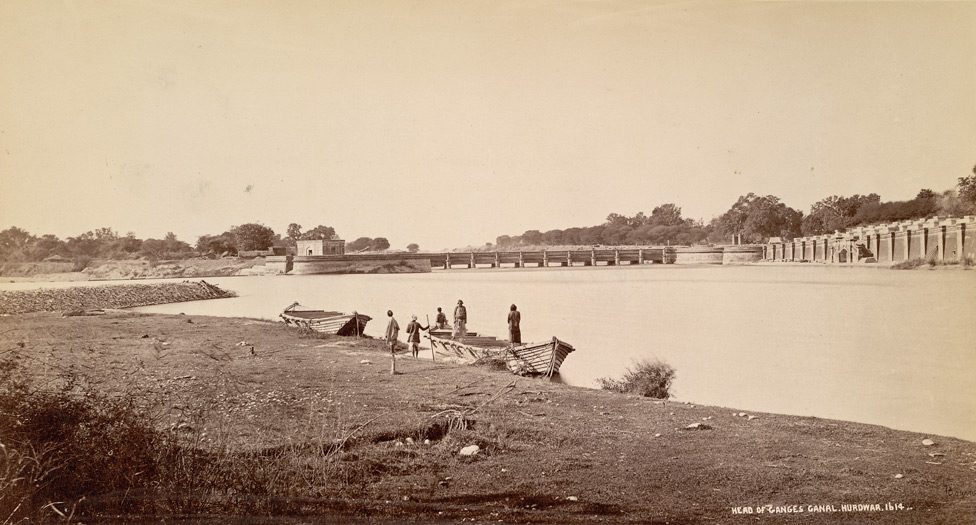
Head works of the Ganges canal in Haridwar (1860). Photograph by Samuel Bourne.

Megasthenes, a Greek ethnographer who visited India during the 3rd century BCE when Mauryans ruled India described the existence of canals in the Gangetic plain. Kautilya (also known as Chanakya), an advisor to Chandragupta Maurya, the founder of Maurya Empire, included the destruction of dams and levees as a strategy during the war. Firuz Shah Tughlaq had many canals built, the longest of which, 240 km (150 mi), was built in 1356 on the Yamuna River. Now known as the Western Yamuna Canal, it has fallen into disrepair and been restored several times. The Mughal emperor Shah Jahan built an irrigation canal on the Yamuna River in the early 17th century. It fell into disuse until 1830, when it was reopened as the Eastern Yamuna Canal, under British control. The reopened canal became a model for the Upper Ganges Canal and all following canal projects.

The Ganges Canal highlighted in red stretching between its headworks off the Ganges River in Haridwar and its confluences with the Jumna (Yamuna) River in Etawah and with the Ganges in Cawnpore (now Kanpur).

The first British canal in India (which did not have Indian antecedents) was the Ganges Canal built between 1842 and 1854. Contemplated first by Col. John Russell Colvin in 1836, it did not at first elicit much enthusiasm from its eventual architect Sir Proby Thomas Cautley, who balked at the idea of cutting a canal through extensive low-lying land to reach the drier upland destination. However, after the Agra famine of 1837–38, during which the East India Company's administration spent Rs. 2,300,000 on famine relief, the idea of a canal became more attractive to the company's budget-conscious Court of Directors. In 1839, the Governor General of India, Lord Auckland, with the Court's assent, granted funds to Cautley for a full survey of the swath of land that underlay and fringed the projected course of the canal. The Court of Directors, moreover, considerably enlarged the scope of the projected canal, which, in consequence of the severity and geographical extent of the famine, they now deemed to be the entire Doab region.

The enthusiasm, however, proved to be short-lived. Auckland's successor as Governor-General, Lord Ellenborough, appeared less receptive to large-scale public works, and for the duration of his tenure, withheld major funds for the project. Only in 1844, when a new Governor-General, Lord Hardinge, was appointed, did official enthusiasm and funds return to the Ganges canal project. Although the intervening impasse had seemingly affected Cautley's health and required him to return to Britain in 1845 for recuperation, his European sojourn gave him an opportunity to study contemporary hydraulic works in the United Kingdom and Italy. By the time of his return to India even more supportive men were at the helm, both in the North-Western Provinces, with James Thomason as Lt. Governor, and in British India with Lord Dalhousie as Governor-General. Canal construction, under Cautley's supervision, now went into full swing. A 560 km (350 mi) long canal, with another 480 km (300 mi) of branch lines, eventually stretched between the headworks in Haridwar, splitting into two branches below Aligarh, and its two confluences with the Yamuna (Jumna in map) mainstem in Etawah and the Ganges in Kanpur (Cawnpore in map). The Ganges Canal, which required a total capital outlay of £2.15 million, was officially opened in 1854 by Lord Dalhousie. According to historian Ian Stone:

It was the largest canal ever attempted in the world, five times greater in its length than all the main irrigation lines of Lombardy and Egypt put together, and longer by a third than even the largest USA navigation canal, the Pennsylvania Canal.

=== Dams and barrages ===
A major barrage at Farakka was opened on 21 April 1975, It is located close to the point where the main flow of the river enters Bangladesh, and the tributary Hooghly (also known as Bhagirathi) continues in West Bengal past Kolkata. This barrage, which feeds the Hooghly branch of the river by a 42 km (26 mi) long feeder canal, and its water flow management has been a long-lingering source of dispute with Bangladesh. Indo-Bangladesh Ganges Water Treaty signed in December 1996 addressed some of the water sharing issues between India and Bangladesh. There is Lav Khush Barrage across the River Ganges in Kanpur.

Tehri Dam was constructed on Bhagirathi River, a tributary of the Ganges. It is located 1.5 km downstream of Ganesh Prayag, the place where Bhilangana meets Bhagirathi. Bhagirathi is called the Ganges after Devprayag. Construction of the dam in an earthquake-prone area was controversial.

Bansagar Dam was built on the Sone River, a tributary of the Ganges for both irrigation and hydroelectric power generation. Ganges floodwaters along with Brahmaputra waters can be supplied to most of its right side basin area along with central and south India by constructing a coastal reservoir to store water on the Bay of Bengal sea area.

== Economy ==
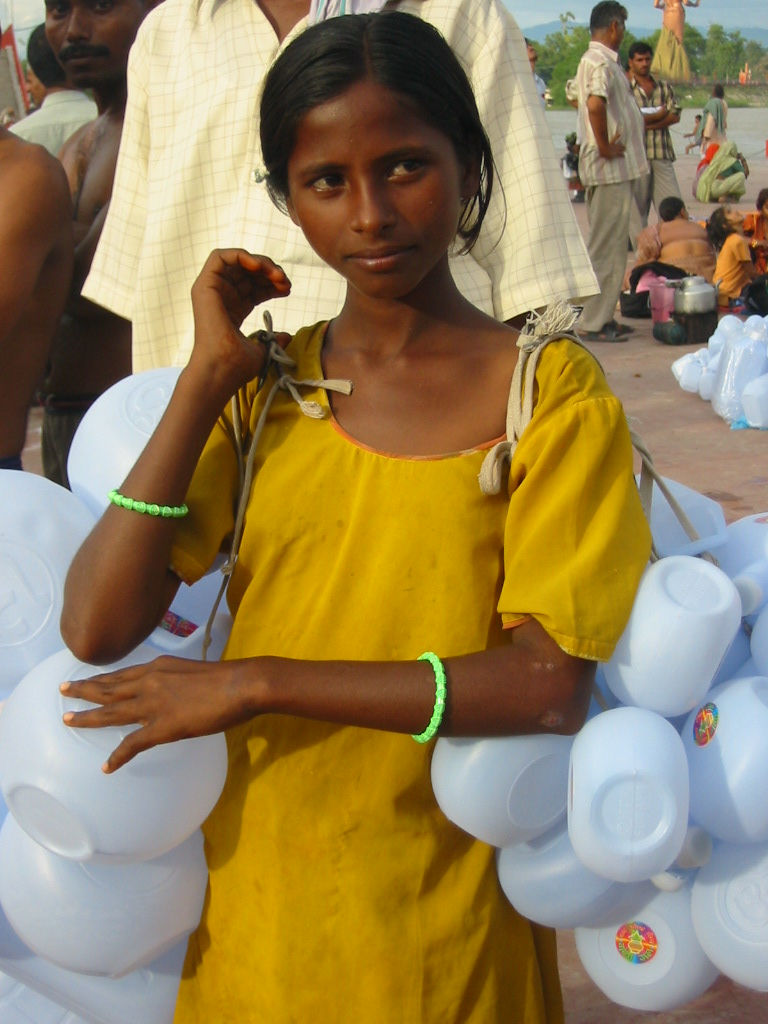
A girl selling plastic containers in Haridwar for carrying Ganges water.

The Ganges Basin with its fertile soil is instrumental to the agricultural economies of India and Bangladesh. The Ganges and its tributaries provide a perennial source of irrigation to a large area. Chief crops cultivated in the area include rice, sugarcane, lentils, oil seeds, potatoes, and wheat. Along the banks of the river, the presence of swamps and lakes provides a rich growing area for crops such as legumes, chillies, mustard, sesame, sugarcane, and jute. There are also many fishing opportunities along the river, though it remains highly polluted. Also, the major industrial towns of Unnao and Kanpur, situated on the banks of the river with the predominance of tanning industries add to the pollution.

=== Tourism ===
Tourism is another related activity. Three towns holy to Hinduism—Haridwar, Prayagraj, and Varanasi—attract millions of pilgrims to its waters to take a dip in the Ganges, which is believed to cleanse oneself of sins and help attain salvation. The rapids of the Ganges are also popular for river rafting in the town of Rishikesh, attracting adventure seekers in the summer months. Several cities such as Kanpur, Kolkata and Patna have also developed riverfront walkways along the banks to attract tourists.

== Ecology and environment ==
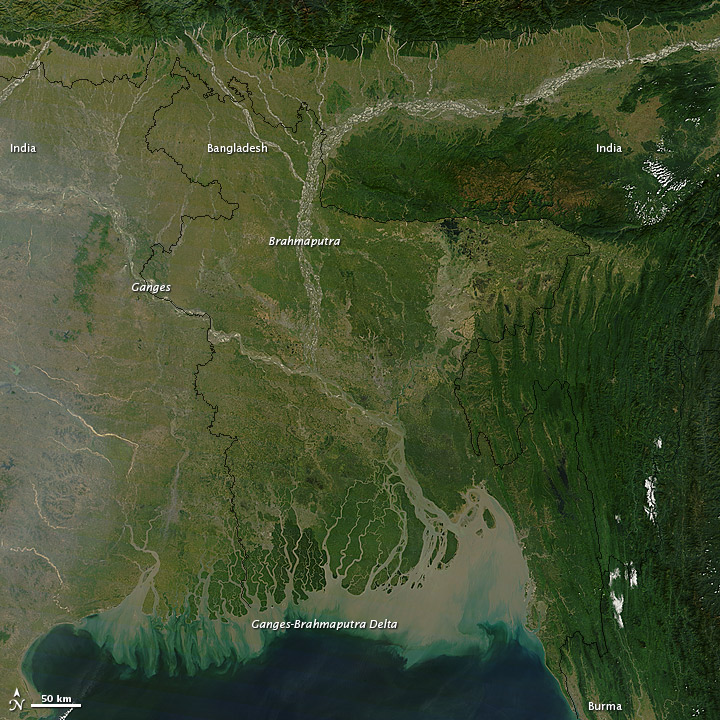
Ganges from Space

Human development, mostly agriculture, has replaced nearly all of the original natural vegetation of the Ganges basin. More than 95% of the upper Gangetic Plain has been degraded or converted to agriculture or urban areas. Only one large block of relatively intact habitat remains, running along the Himalayan foothills and including Rajaji National Park, Jim Corbett National Park, and Dudhwa National Park. As recently as the 16th and 17th centuries the upper Gangetic Plain harboured impressive populations of wild Asian elephants (Elephas maximus), Bengal tigers (Panthera t. tigris), Indian rhinoceros (Rhinoceros unicornis), gaurs (Bos gaurus), barasinghas (Rucervus duvaucelii), sloth bears (Melursus ursinus) and Indian lions (Panthera leo leo). In the 21st century there are few large wild animals, mostly deer, wild boars, wildcats, and small numbers of Indian wolves, golden jackals, and red and Bengal foxes. Bengal tigers survive only in the Sundarbans area of the Ganges Delta. The Sundarbands freshwater swamp ecoregion, however, is nearly extinct. The Sundarbans mangroves (Heritiera fomes) also grow in the Sundarbans area of the Ganges Delta. Threatened mammals in the upper Gangetic Plain include the tiger, elephant, sloth bear, and four-horned antelope (Tetracerus quadricornis).

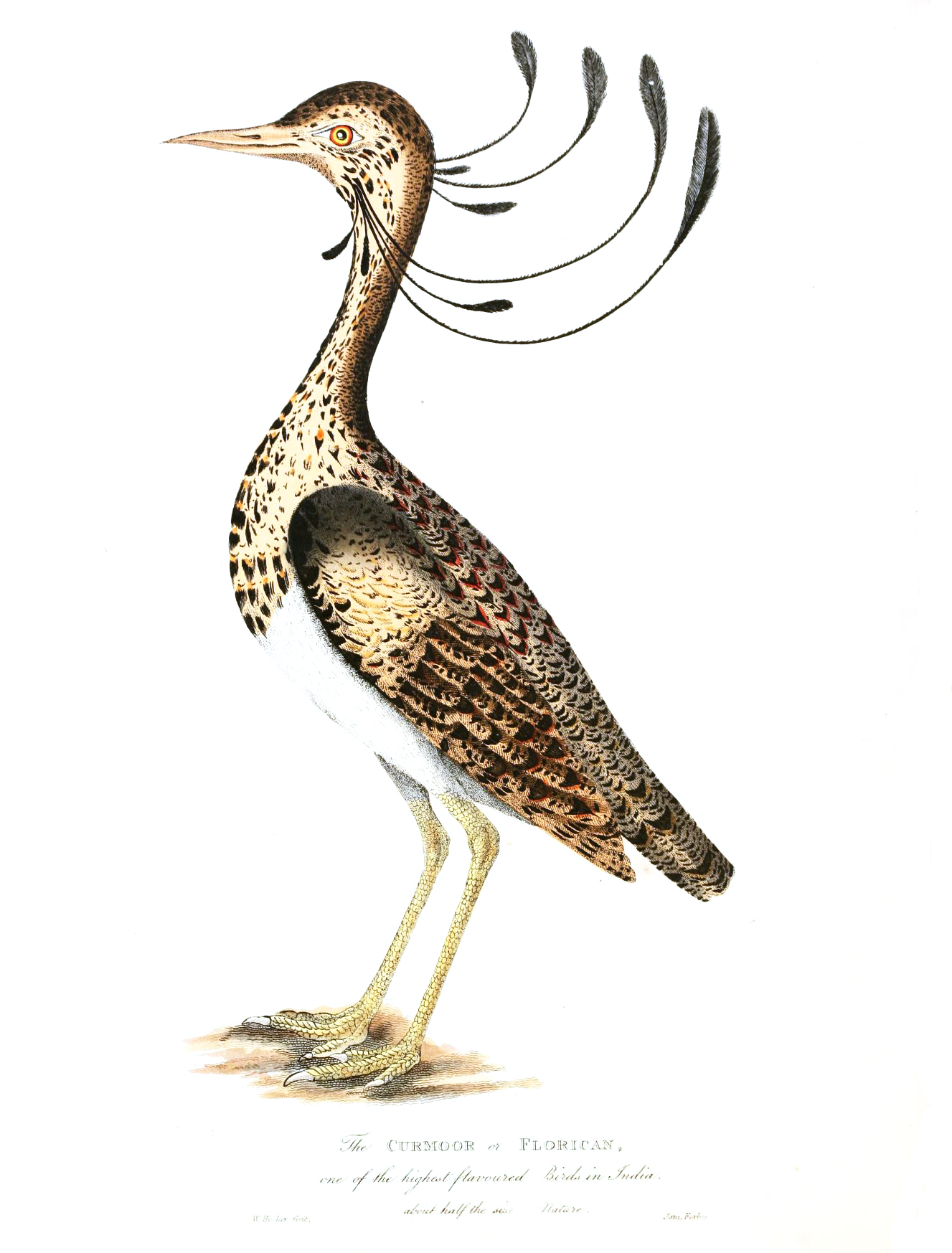
Lesser florican (Sypheotides indicus)

Many types of birds are found throughout the basin, such as myna, Psittacula parakeets, crows, kites, partridges, and fowls. Ducks and snipes migrate across the Himalayas during the winter, attracted in large numbers to wetland areas. There are no endemic birds in the upper Gangetic Plain. The great Indian bustard (Ardeotis nigriceps) and lesser florican (Sypheotides indicus) are considered globally threatened.

The natural forest of the upper Gangetic Plain has been so thoroughly eliminated it is difficult to assign a natural vegetation type with certainty. There are a few small patches of forest left, and they suggest that much of the upper plains may have supported a tropical moist deciduous forest with sal (Shorea robusta) as a climax species.

A similar situation is found in the lower Gangetic Plain, which includes the lower Brahmaputra River. The lower plains contain more open forests, which tend to be dominated by Bombax ceiba in association with Albizzia procera, Duabanga grandiflora, and Sterculia vilosa. There are early seral forest communities that would eventually become dominated by the climax species sal (Shorea robusta) if forest succession was allowed to proceed. In most places forests fail to reach climax conditions due to human causes. The forests of the lower Gangetic Plain, despite thousands of years of human settlement, remained largely intact until the early 20th century. Today only about 3% of the ecoregion is under natural forest and only one large block, south of Varanasi, remains. There are over forty protected areas in the ecoregion, but over half of these are less than 100 km^{2} (39 sq mi). The fauna of the lower Gangetic Plain is similar to the upper plains, with the addition of a number of other species such as the smooth-coated otter (Lutrogale perspicillata) and the large Indian civet (Viverra zibetha).

=== Fish ===
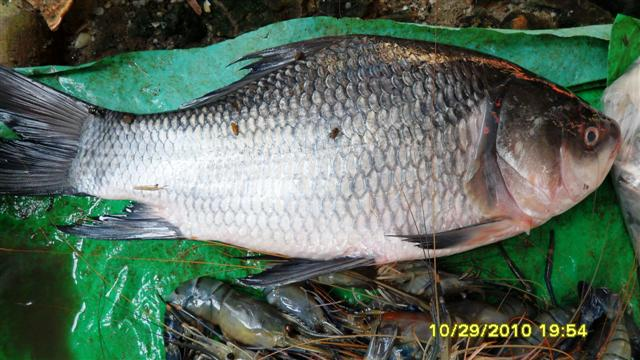
The catla (Catla catla) is one of the Indian carp species that support major fisheries in the Ganges.

It has been estimated that about 350 fish species live in the entire Ganges drainage, including several endemics. In a major 2007–2009 study of fish in the Ganges basin (including the river itself and its tributaries, but excluding the Brahmaputra and Meghna basins), a total of 143 fish species were recorded, including 10 non-native introduced species. The most diverse orders are Cypriniformes (barbs and allies), Siluriformes (catfish) and Perciformes (perciform fish), each comprising about 50%, 23% and 14% of the total fish species in the drainage.

There are distinct differences between the different sections of the river basin, but Cyprinidae is the most diverse throughout. In the upper section (roughly equalling the basin parts in Uttarakhand) more than 50 species have been recorded and Cyprinidae alone accounts for almost 80% those, followed by Balitoridae (about 15.6%) and Sisoridae (about 12.2%). Sections of the Ganges basin at altitudes above 2,400–3,000 m (7,900–9,800 ft) above sea level are generally without fish. Typical genera approaching this altitude are Schizothorax, Tor, Barilius, Nemacheilus and Glyptothorax. About 100 species have been recorded from the middle section of the basin (roughly equalling the sections in Uttar Pradesh and parts of Bihar) and more than 55% of these are in family Cyprinidae, followed by Schilbeidae (about 10.6%) and Clupeidae (about 8.6%). The lower section (roughly equalling the basin in parts of Bihar and West Bengal) includes major floodplains and is home to almost 100 species. About 46% of these are in the family Cyprinidae, followed by Schilbeidae (about 11.4%) and Bagridae (about 9%).

The Ganges basin supports major fisheries, but these have declined in recent decades. In the Prayagraj region in the middle section of the basin, catches of carp fell from 424.91 metric tons in 1961–1968 to 38.58 metric tons in 2001–2006, and catches of catfish fell from 201.35 metric tons in 1961–1968 to 40.56 metric tons in 2001–2006. In the Patna region in the lower section of the basin, catches of carp fell from 383.2 metric tons to 118, and catfish from 373.8 metric tons to 194.48. Some of the fish commonly caught in fisheries include catla (Catla catla), golden mahseer (Tor putitora), tor mahseer (Tor tor), rohu (Labeo rohita), walking catfish (Clarias batrachus), pangas catfish (Pangasius pangasius), goonch catfish (Bagarius), snakeheads (Channa), bronze featherback (Notopterus notopterus) and milkfish (Chanos chanos).

The Ganges basin is home to about 30 fish species that are listed as threatened with the primary issues being overfishing (sometimes illegal), pollution, water abstraction, siltation and invasive species. Among the threatened species is the critically endangered Ganges shark (Glyphis gangeticus). Several fish species migrate between different sections of the river, but these movements may be prevented by the building of dams.

=== Crocodilians and turtles ===
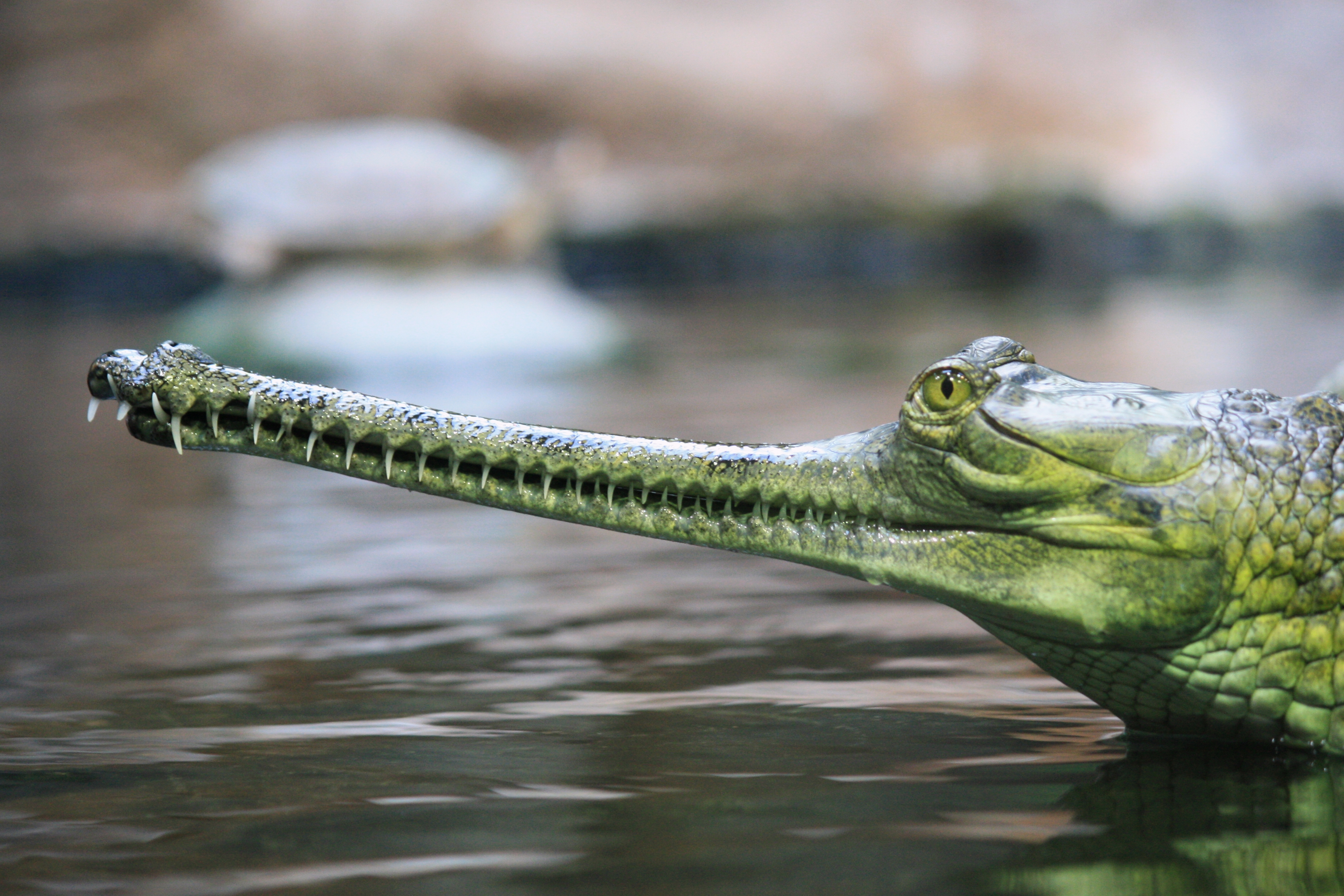
The threatened gharial (Gavialis gangeticus) is a large fish-eating crocodilian that is harmless to humans

The main sections of the Ganges River are home to the gharial (Gavialis gangeticus) and mugger crocodile (Crocodylus palustris), and the Ganges delta is home to the saltwater crocodile (C. porosus). Among the numerous aquatic and semi-aquatic turtles in the Ganges basin are the northern river terrapin (Batagur baska; only in the lowermost section of the basin), three-striped roofed turtle (B. dhongoka), red-crowned roofed turtle (B. kachuga), black pond turtle (Geoclemys hamiltonii), Brahminy river turtle (Hardella thurjii), Indian black turtle (Melanochelys trijuga), Indian eyed turtle (Morenia petersi), brown roofed turtle (Pangshura smithii), Indian roofed turtle (Pangshura tecta), Indian tent turtle (Pangshura tentoria), Indian flapshell turtle (Lissemys punctata), Indian narrow-headed softshell turtle (Chitra indica), Indian softshell turtle (Nilssonia gangetica), Indian peacock softshell turtle (N. hurum) and Cantor's giant softshell turtle (Pelochelys cantorii; only in the lowermost section of Ganges basin). Most of these are seriously threatened.

=== Ganges river dolphin ===
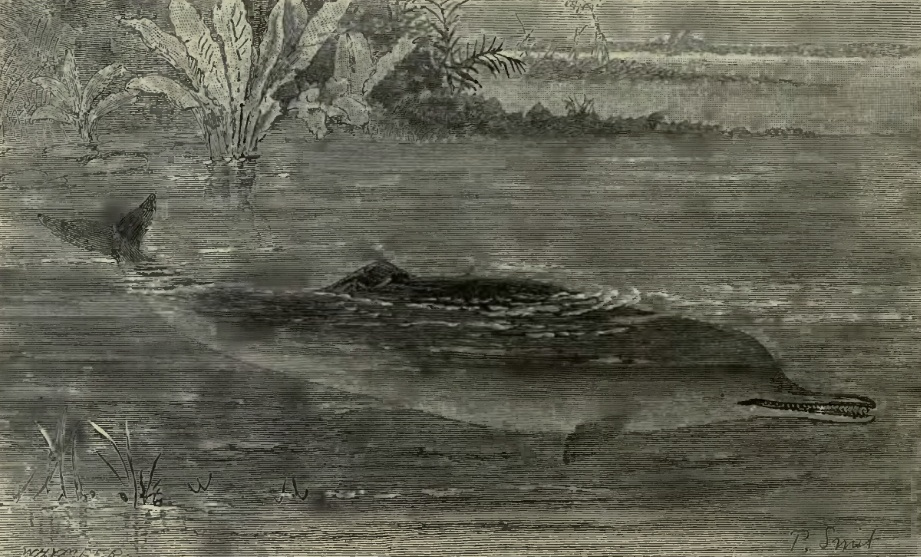
The Gangetic dolphin in a sketch by Whymper and P. Smit, 1894.

The river's most famed faunal member is the freshwater Ganges river dolphin (Platanista gangetica gangetica), which has been declared India's national aquatic animal.

This dolphin used to exist in large schools near urban centres in both the Ganges and Brahmaputra rivers but is now seriously threatened by pollution, dam construction and improper fishing methods. Their numbers have now dwindled to a quarter of their numbers of fifteen years before, and they have become extinct in the Ganges' main tributaries. A 2012 survey by the World Wildlife Fund found only 3,000 left in the water catchment of both river systems.

The Ganges river dolphin is one of only five true freshwater dolphins in the world. The other four are the baiji (Lipotes vexillifer) of the Yangtze River in China, now likely extinct; the Indus River dolphin of the Indus River in Pakistan; the Amazon river dolphin of the Amazon River in South America; and the Araguaian river dolphin (not considered a separate species until 2014) of the Araguaia–Tocantins basin in Brazil. There are several marine dolphins whose ranges include some freshwater habitats, but these five are the only dolphins who live only in freshwater rivers and lakes.

=== Effects of climate change ===
The Tibetan Plateau contains the world's third-largest store of ice. Qin Dahe, the former head of the China Meteorological Administration, said that the recent fast pace of melting and warmer temperatures will be good for agriculture and tourism in the short term; but issued a strong warning:

Temperatures are rising four times faster than elsewhere in China, and the Tibetan glaciers are retreating at a higher speed than in any other part of the world. ... In the short term, this will cause lakes to expand and bring floods and mudflows ... In the long run, the glaciers are vital lifelines for Asian rivers, including the Indus and the Ganges. Once they vanish, water supplies in those regions will be in peril.

In 2007, the Intergovernmental Panel on Climate Change (IPCC), in its Fourth Report, stated that the Himalayan glaciers which feed the river were at risk of melting by 2035. The IPCC has now withdrawn that prediction, as the original source admitted that it was speculative and the cited source was not a peer-reviewed finding. (Note: The IPCC report is based on a non-peer-reviewed work by the World Wildlife Federation. They, in turn, drew their information from an interview conducted by New Scientist with Hasnain, an Indian glaciologist, who admitted that the view was speculative. See: "Sifting climate facts from speculation". New Scientist. 13 January 2010. and "Pachauri calls Indian govt. report on melting Himalayan glaciers as 'voodoo science'". Thaindian News. 9 January 2010. Archived from the original on 28 January 2010. On the IPCC statement withdrawing the finding, see: "IPCC statement on the melting of Himalayan glaciers" (PDF). IPCC – Intergovernmental Panel on Climate Change. 20 January 2010. Archived from the original (PDF) on 15 February 2010.) In its statement, the IPCC stands by its general findings relating to the Himalayan glaciers being at risk from global warming (with consequent risks to water flow into the Gangetic basin). Many studies have suggested that climate change will affect the water resources in the Ganges river basin including increased summer (monsoon) flow, and peak runoff could result in an increased risk of flooding.

== Pollution and environmental concerns ==
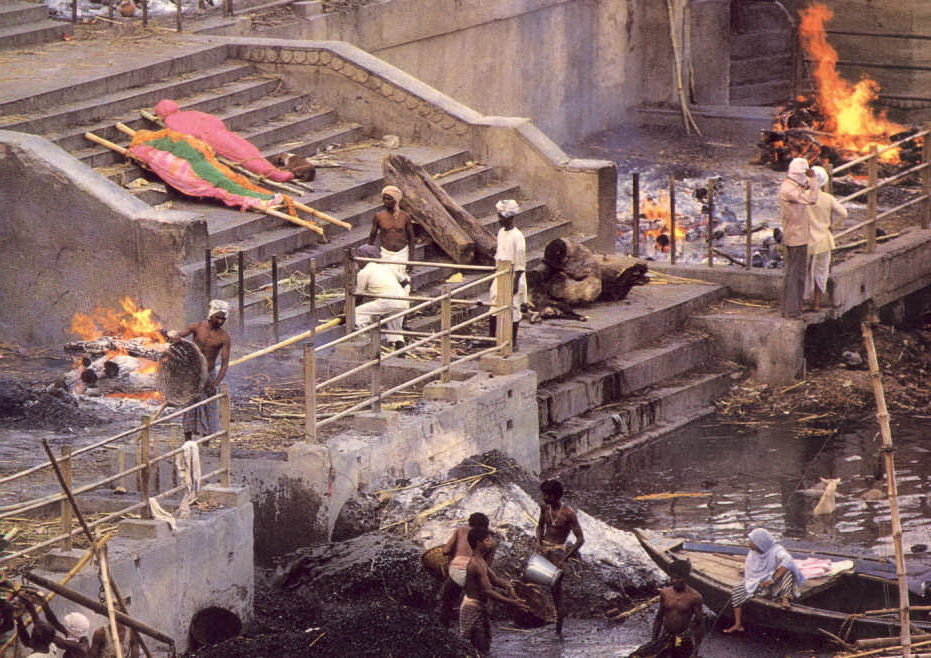
Burning ghats in Varanasi; the ashes of the dead are released along the banks of the Ganges.

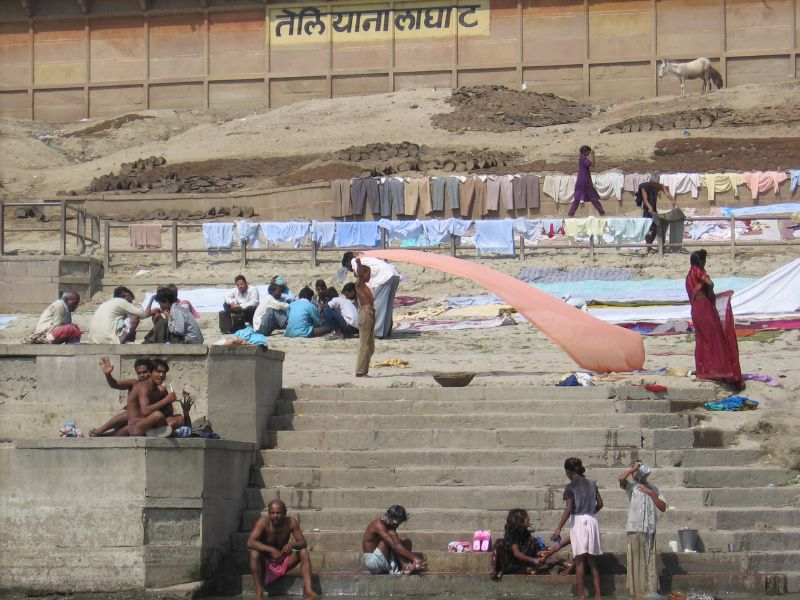
People bathing and washing clothes along the banks of the Ganges in Varanasi

The Ganges suffers from extreme pollution levels, caused by the 400 million people who live close to the river. Sewage from many cities along the river's course, industrial waste and religious offerings wrapped in non-degradable plastics add large amounts of pollutants to the river as it flows through densely populated areas. The problem is exacerbated by the fact that many poorer people rely on the river on a daily basis for bathing, washing, and cooking. The World Bank estimates that the health costs of water pollution in India equal three percent of India's GDP. (Note: Bharati (2006) "The World Bank estimates the health costs of water pollution in India to be equivalent to three per cent of the country's gross domestic product. With Indian rivers being severely polluted, interlinking them may actually increase these costs. Also, with the widely recognised failure of the Ganga Action Plan, there is a danger that contaminants from the Gangetic basin might enter other basins and destroy their natural cleansing processes. The new areas that will be river-fed after the introduction of the scheme may experience crop failures or routing due to alien compounds carried into their streams from the polluted Gangetic basin streams." (p. 26)) It has also been suggested that eighty percent of all illnesses in India and one-third of deaths can be attributed to water-borne diseases.

Varanasi, a city of one million people that many pilgrims visit to take a "holy dip" in the Ganges, releases around 200 million liters of untreated human sewage into the river each day, leading to large concentrations of fecal coliform bacteria. According to official standards, water safe for bathing should not contain more than 500 fecal coliforms per 100 ml, yet upstream of Varanasi's ghats the river water already contains 120 times as much, 60,000 fecal coliform bacteria per 100 ml.

After the cremation of the deceased at Varanasi's ghats, the bones and ashes are immersed into the Ganges. However, in the past thousands of uncremated bodies were thrown into the Ganges during cholera epidemics, spreading the disease. Even today, holy men, pregnant women, people with leprosy or chicken pox, people who have been bitten by snakes, people who have committed suicide, the poor, and children under 5 are not cremated at the ghats but are left to float free, to decompose in the waters. In addition, those who cannot afford the large amount of wood needed to incinerate the entire body, leave behind many half-burned body parts.

After passing through Varanasi, and receiving 32 streams of raw sewage from the city, the concentration of fecal coliforms in the river's waters rises from 60,000 to 1.5 million, with observed peak values of 100 million per 100 ml. Drinking and bathing in its waters therefore carries a high risk of infection.

Between 1985 and 2000, Rs. 10 billion, around US$226 million, were spent on the Ganga Action Plan, an environmental initiative that was "the largest single attempt to clean up a polluted river anywhere in the world". The Ganga Action Plan has been described variously as a "failure" (Note: Caso & Wolf (2010) "Chronology: 1985 *India launches Phase I of the Ganga Action Plan to restore the Ganges River; most deem it a failure by the early 1990s." (p. 320)) (Note: Dudgeon (2005) "To reduce the water pollution in one of Asia's major rivers, the Indian Government initiated the Ganga Action Plan in 1985. The objective of this centrally funded scheme was to treat the effluent from all the major towns along the Ganges and reduce pollution in the river by at least 75%. The Ganga Action Plan built upon the existing but weakly enforced, 1974 Water Prevention and Control Act. A government audit of the Ganga Action Plan in 2000 reported limited success in meeting effluent targets. Development plans for sewage treatment facilities were submitted by only 73% of the cities along the Ganges, and only 54% of these were judged acceptable by the authorities. Not all the cities reported how much effluent was being treated, and many continued to discharge raw sewage into the river. Test audits of installed capacity indicated poor performance, and there were long delays in constructing planned treatment facilities. After 15 yr. of implementation, the audit estimated that the Ganga Action Plan had achieved only 14% of the anticipated sewage treatment capacity. The environmental impact of this failure has been exacerbated by the removal of large quantities of irrigation water from the Ganges which offset any gains from effluent reductions.") and a "major failure".

According to one study,

The Ganga Action Plan, which was taken on priority and with much enthusiasm, was delayed for two years. The expenditure was almost doubled. But the result was not very appreciable. Much expenditure was done on political propaganda. The concerning governments and the related agencies were not very prompt to make it a success. The public of the areas was not taken into consideration. The release of urban and industrial wastes in the river was not controlled fully. The flowing of dirty water through drains and sewers were not adequately diverted. The continuing customs of burning dead bodies, throwing carcasses, washing of dirty clothes by washermen, and immersion of idols and cattle wallowing were not checked. Very little provision of public latrines was made and the open defecation of lakhs of people continued along the riverside. All these made the Action Plan a failure.

The failure of the Ganga Action Plan has also been variously attributed to "environmental planning without proper understanding of the human-environment interactions", Indian "traditions and beliefs", (Note: Tiwari (2008) "Many social traditions and customs are not only helping in environmental degradation but are causing obstruction to environmental management and planning. The failure of the Ganga Action Plan to clean the sacred river is partly associated with our traditions and beliefs. The disposal of dead bodies, the immersion of idols, and public bathing are part of Hindu customs and rituals which are based on the notion that the sacred river leads to the path of salvation, and under no circumstances its water can become impure. Burning of dead bodies through wood, bursting of crackers during Diwali, putting thousands of tonnes of fuelwood under fire during Holi, immersion of Durga and Ganesh idols into rivers and seas, etc. are part of Hindu customs and are detrimental to the environment. These and many other rituals need rethinking and modification in the light of contemporary situations." (p. 92)) "corruption and a lack of technical knowledge" and "lack of support from religious authorities".

In December 2009 the World Bank agreed to loan India US$1 billion over the next five years to help save the river. According to 2010 Planning Commission estimates, an investment of almost Rs. 70 billion (Rs. 70 billion, approximately US$1.5 billion) is needed to clean up the river.

In November 2008, the Ganges, alone among India's rivers, was declared a "National River", facilitating the formation of a National Ganga River Basin Authority that would have greater powers to plan, implement and monitor measures aimed at protecting the river.

In July 2014, the Government of India announced an integrated Ganges-development project titled Namami Gange Programme and allocated ₹2,037 crore for this purpose. The main objectives of the Namami Gange project is to improve the water quality by the abatement of pollution and rejuvenation of river Ganga by creating infrastructures like sewage treatment plants, river surface cleaning, biodiversity conservation, afforestation, and public awareness.

In March 2017 the High Court of Uttarakhand declared the Ganges River a legal "person", in a move that according to one newspaper, "could help in efforts to clean the pollution-choked rivers". As of 6 April 2017, the ruling has been commented on in Indian newspapers to be hard to enforce, that experts do not anticipate immediate benefits, that the ruling is "hardly game changing", that experts believe "any follow-up action is unlikely", and that the "judgment is deficient to the extent it acted without hearing others (in states outside Uttarakhand) who have stakes in the matter."

The incidence of water-borne and enteric diseases—such as gastrointestinal disease, cholera, dysentery, hepatitis A and typhoid—among people who use the river's waters for bathing, washing dishes and brushing teeth is high, at an estimated 66% per year.

Recent studies by Indian Council of Medical Research (ICMR) say that the river is so full of killer pollutants that those living along its banks in Uttar Pradesh, Bihar, and Bengal are more prone to cancer than anywhere else in the country. Conducted by the National Cancer Registry Programme under the ICMR, the study throws up shocking findings indicating that the river is thick with heavy metals and lethal chemicals that cause cancer. According to Deputy Director-General of NCRP A. Nandkumar, the incidence of cancer was highest in the country in areas drained by the Ganges and stated that the problem would be studied deeply and with the findings presented in a report to the health ministry.

Apart from that, many NGOs have come forward to rejuvenate the river Ganges. Vikrant Tongad, an Environmental specialist from SAFE Green filed a petition against Simbhaoli Sugar Mill (Hapur UP) to NGT. NGT slapped a fine of Rs. 5 crores to Sugar Mill and a fine of Rs. 25 lakhs to Gopaljee Dairy for discharging untreated effluents into the Simbhaoli drain.

=== Water shortages ===
Along with ever-increasing pollution, water shortages are getting noticeably worse. Some sections of the river are already completely dry. Around Varanasi, the river once had an average depth of 60 m (200 ft), but in some places, it is now only 10 m (33 ft).

To cope with its chronic water shortages, India employs electric groundwater pumps, diesel-powered tankers, and coal-fed power plants. If the country increasingly relies on these energy-intensive short-term fixes, the whole planet's climate will bear the consequences. India is under enormous pressure to develop its economic potential while also protecting its environment—something few, if any, countries have accomplished. What India does with its water will be a test of whether that combination is possible.

=== Mining ===
Illegal mining in the Ganges river bed for stones and sand for construction work has long been a problem in Haridwar district, Uttarakhand, where it touches the plains for the first time. This is despite the fact that quarrying has been banned in Kumbh Mela area zone covering 140 km^{2} area in Haridwar.

== River restoration and aquatic biodiversity conservation ==
India’s first nationwide river dolphin population assessment, conducted during 2021–2023, estimated 6324 Ganges river dolphins across the Ganga and Brahmaputra river basins. The survey covered about 8,406 km of rivers and involved government agencies and conservation organisations including WWF-India, Aaranyak and Wildlife Trust of India. In December 2024, India also undertook the first satellite tagging of a Ganges river dolphin in Assam to study its movements, habitat use and migration patterns.

In 2024, conservation programs under the Namami Gange initiative reported the reintroduction of 1428 gharials and 1899 freshwater turtles into the Ganga and its tributaries. The measure is to restore threatened aquatic species and strengthen biodiversity across the river basin.

In 2026, ilish was recorded in the middle and upper reaches of the Ganges after being largely absent from these stretches for several decades. The Central Inland Fisheries Research Institute (ICAR-CIFRI) reported two 'hilsa' near Chandauli district in Uttar Pradesh, nearly three decades after the species was last recorded in the upstream reaches. The return was regarded as an indicator of improved riverine conditions and progress in aquatic biodiversity conservation.

== In art and literature ==
- The Ganges. A painting of the Ganges entering the plains near Haridwar by William Purser with a poetical illustration by Letitia Elizabeth Landon in Fisher's Drawing Room Scrap Book, 1838.
- Colgong on the Ganges. A painting of the Ganges near Kahalgaon by J. M. W. Turner with a poetical illustration by Letitia Elizabeth Landon in Fisher's Drawing Room Scrap Book, 1839.
- Features as a level in the 1998 video game Tomb Raider III.

== See also ==
- Environmental personhood
- Fair river sharing
- Ganga (goddess)
- Ganga Lake (Mongolia)
- Ganga Pushkaram
- Ganga Talao
- Gangaputra Brahmin
- List of most polluted rivers
- List of rivers by discharge
- List of rivers of India
- List of river systems by length
- Mahaweli River
- National Waterway 1
- Peninsular River System
- Pollution of the Ganges
- River bank erosion along the Ganges in Malda and Murshidabad districts
- Sacred waters
- Sankat Mochan Foundation

== Sources ==
- Abraham, Wolf-Rainer (2011). "Megacities as Sources for Pathogenic Bacteria in Rivers and Their Fate Downstream" (PDF). International Journal of Microbiology. 2011 (798292): 1–13. doi:10.1155/2011/798292. PMC 2946570. PMID 20885968. Archived (PDF) from the original on 20 January 2022.
- Ali, Jason R.; Aitchison, Jonathan C. (2005). "Greater India". Earth-Science Reviews. 72 (3–4): 169–88. Bibcode:2005ESRv...72..169A. doi:10.1016/j.earscirev.2005.07.005.
- Alley, Kelly D. (2002), On the banks of the Gaṅgā: when wastewater meets a sacred river, University of Michigan Press, ISBN 978-0-472-06808-1
- Alter, Stephen (2001), Sacred waters: a pilgrimage up the Ganges River to the source of Hindu culture, Harcourt, ISBN 978-0-15-100585-7, archived from the original on 24 March 2023
- Arnold, Guy (2000). World Strategic Highways (1st ed.). Fitzroy Dearborn. pp. 223–27. doi:10.4324/9781315062204. ISBN 978-1-57958-098-8.
- Berga, L. (2006). Dams and Reservoirs, Societies and Environment in the 21st Century. Proceedings of the International Symposium on Dams in the Societies of the 21st Century, 22nd International Congress on Large Dams (ICOLD). Barcelona, Spain: Taylor & Francis. ISBN 978-0-415-40423-5.
- Bharati, Radha Kant (2006), Interlinking of Indian rivers, Lotus, ISBN 978-81-8382-041-7
- Blurton, T. Richard (1993), Hindu art, Harvard University Press, ISBN 978-0-674-39189-5, archived from the original on 15 January 2023
- Brichieri-Colombi, Stephen; Bradnock, Robert W. (2003). "Geopolitics, water and development in South Asia: cooperative development in the Ganges–Brahmaputra delta". The Geographical Journal. 169 (1): 43–64. Bibcode:2003GeogJ.169...43B. doi:10.1111/1475-4959.t01-1-00002.
- Brune, James N. (1993). "The seismic hazard at Tehri dam". Tectonophysics. 218 (1–3): 281–86. Bibcode:1993Tectp.218..281B. doi:10.1016/0040-1951(93)90274-N.
- Caso, Frank; Wolf, Aaron T. (2010), Freshwater Supply Global Issues, Infobase, ISBN 978-0-8160-7826-4
- Chakrabarti, Dilip K. (2001). "4 The Archaeology of West Bengal: The Bhagirathi Mouth and the Midnapur Coast". Archaeological Geography of the Ganga Plain: The Lower and the Middle Ganga. Permanent Black. ISBN 978-81-7824-016-9.
- Darian, Steven G. (2001), The Ganges in myth and history, Motilal Banarsidass, ISBN 978-81-208-1757-9
- Dhungel, Dwarika Nath; Pun, Santa B. (2009). The Nepal-India Water Relationship: Challenges. Springer. Bibcode:2009niwr.book.....D. ISBN 978-1-4020-8402-7.
- Dikshit, K.R.; Joseph E. Schwartzberg (2007), "India: The Land", Encyclopædia Britannica, Encyclopedia Britannica, pp. 1–29, archived from the original on 8 May 2015
- Dudgeon, David (2005). "River Rehabilitation for Conservation of Fish Biodiversity in Monsoonal Asia" (PDF). Ecology and Society. 10 (2:15) art15. Bibcode:2005EcSoc..10Tr.15D. doi:10.5751/ES-01469-100215. Archived (PDF) from the original on 13 August 2016.
- Eck, Diana L. (1982), Banaras, city of light, Columbia University, ISBN 978-0-231-11447-9, archived from the original on 4 April 2023
- Eck, Diana (1998), "Gangā: The Goddess Ganges in Hindu Sacred Geography", in Hawley, John Stratton; Wulff, Donna Marie (eds.), Devī: Goddesses of India, University of California / Motilal Banarasidass, pp. 137–53, ISBN 978-81-208-1491-2
- Elhance, Arun P. (1999). Hydropolitics in the Third World: Conflict and Cooperation in International River Basins. United States Institute of Peace. ISBN 978-1-878379-90-0.
- Gardner, Gary (2003), "Engaging Religion in the Quest for a Sustainable World", in Bright, Chris; et al. (eds.), State of the World: 2003 (Special 20th anniversary ed.), Norton, pp. 152–76, ISBN 978-0-393-32386-3
- Ghosh, A. (1990). An Encyclopaedia of Indian Archaeology. Brill. p. 334. ISBN 978-90-04-09264-8.
- Gupta, Avijit (2007). Large rivers: geomorphology and management. Wiley. ISBN 978-0-470-84987-3.
- Haberman, David L. (2006), River of Love in an Age of Pollution: The Yamuna River of Northern India, University of California, ISBN 978-0-520-24790-1
- Hill, Christopher V. (2008). "3 The Mauryan Empire and the Classical Age – Irrigation in Early India". South Asia: an environmental history. Abc-Clio. p. 32. ISBN 978-1-85109-925-2.
- Hillary, Sir Edmund (1980), From the ocean to the sky, Ulverscroft, ISBN 978-0-7089-0587-6
- Jain, Sharad K.; Agarwal, Pushpendra K.; Singh, Vijay P. (2007). Hydrology and water resources of India. Springer. Bibcode:2007hwri.book.....J. ISBN 978-1-4020-5179-1.
- Krishna Murti, C. R. (1991). The Ganga, a scientific study. Gaṅgā Pariyojanā Nideśālaya; India Environment Research Committee. Northern Book Centre. ISBN 978-81-7211-021-5. OCLC 853267663.
- Kumar, Rakesh; Singh, R. D.; Sharma, K. D. (10 September 2005). "Water Resources of India" (PDF). Current Science. 89 (5): 794–811. Archived (PDF) from the original on 14 October 2013.
- Los Angeles County Museum of Art; Pal, Pratapaditya (1988), Indian Sculpture: 700–1800, University of California Press, ISBN 978-0-520-06477-5
- Maclean, Kama (2008), Pilgrimage and power: the Kumbh Mela in Allahabad, 1765–1954, Oxford University Press US, ISBN 978-0-19-533894-2, archived from the original on 5 April 2023
- Markandya, Anil; Murty, Maddipati Narasimha (2000), Cleaning-up the Ganges: a cost-benefit analysis of the Ganga Action Plan, Oxford University Press, ISBN 978-0-19-564945-1
- Mirza, M. Monirul Qader (2004). The Ganges water diversion: environmental effects and implications. Water Science and Technology Library. Vol. 49. Dordecht: Springer. pp. 1–6. doi:10.1007/978-1-4020-2792-5. ISBN 978-90-481-6665-7. OCLC 853267663.
- Newby, Eric (1998), Slowly down the Ganges, Lonely Planet, ISBN 978-0-86442-631-4
- Pal, Pratapaditya (1997), Divine images, human visions: the Max Tanenbaum collection of South Asian and Himalayan art in the National Gallery of Canada, National Gallery of Canada, ISBN 978-1-896209-05-0
- Parua, Pranab Kumar (2009), "14 Necessity of Regional Co-operation", The Ganga: water use in the Indian subcontinent, Springer, pp. 267–72, ISBN 978-90-481-3102-0
- Prakash, Gyan (1999). "6 Technologies of Government". Another Reason: Science and the Imagination of Modern India. Princeton University Press. ISBN 978-0-691-00453-2.
- Puttick, Elizabeth (2008), "Mother Ganges, India's Sacred River", in Emoto, Masaru (ed.), The Healing Power of Water, Hay House, pp. 241–52, ISBN 978-1-4019-0877-5
- Rahaman, M.M. (2009), "Integrated Ganges Basin Management: conflicts and hope for regional development", Water Policy, 11 (2): 168–90, Bibcode:2009WaPol..11..168R, doi:10.2166/wp.2009.012, archived from the original on 27 September 2011
- Rahaman, M.M. (2009), "Principles of transboundary water resources management and Ganges Treaties: An Analysis", International Journal of Water Resources Development, 25 (1): 159–73, Bibcode:2009IJWRD..25..159R, doi:10.1080/07900620802517574, S2CID 155016224
- Rodda, John C.; Ubertini, Lucio (2004). The Basis of Civilization: Water Science?. IAHS publication no. 286. Wallingford, Oxfordshire, UK: International Association of Hydrological Sciences, IAHS International Commission on Water Resources Systems. p. 165. ISBN 978-1-901502-57-2.
- Sack DA, Sack RB, Nair GB, Siddique AK (2004). "Cholera". Lancet. 363 (9404): 223–33. doi:10.1016/S0140-6736(03)15328-7. PMID 14738797. S2CID 208793200.
- Salman, Salman M. A.; Uprety, Kishor (2002). Conflict and Cooperation on South Asia's International Rivers: A Legal Perspective. London, The Hague, New York: Kluwer Law International. ISBN 978-0-8213-5352-3. "Alternate copy" (PDF). Archived (PDF) from the original on 7 April 2022.
- Sharma, Ramesh C.; Bahuguna, Manju; Chauhan, Punam (2008). "Periphytonic diversity in Bhagirathi:Preimpoundment study of Tehri dam reservoir". Journal of Environmental Science and Engineering. 50 (4): 255–62. PMID 19697759.
- Sheth, Jagdish N. (2008). Chindia Rising. Tata McGraw-Hill. ISBN 978-0-07-065708-3.
- Singh, Munendra; Singh, Amit K. (2007). "Bibliography of Environmental Studies in Natural Characteristics and Anthropogenic Influences on the Ganga River". Environ Monit Assess. 129 (1–3): 421–32. Bibcode:2007EMnAs.129..421S. doi:10.1007/s10661-006-9374-7. PMID 17072555. S2CID 39845300.
- Singh, Nirmal T. (2005). Irrigation and soil salinity in the Indian subcontinent: past and present. Bethlehem, PA: Lehigh University. ISBN 978-0-934223-78-2.
- Stone, Ian (2002), Canal Irrigation in British India: Perspectives on Technological Change in a Peasant Economy, CUP, ISBN 978-0-521-52663-0
- Suvedī, Sūryaprasāda (2005). International watercourses law for the 21st century: the case of the river Ganges basin. Ashgate. ISBN 978-0-7546-4527-6.
- Thapar, Romila (October 1971). "The Image of the Barbarian in Early India". Comparative Studies in Society and History. 13 (4): 408–36. doi:10.1017/s0010417500006393. JSTOR 178208. S2CID 143480731.
- Tiwari, R. C. (2008), "Environmental Scenario in India", in Dutt, Ashok K. (ed.), Explorations in Applied Geography, PHI Learning, ISBN 978-81-203-3384-0
- Wangu, Madhu Bazaz (2003), Images of Indian goddesses: myths, meanings, and models, Abhinav Publications, ISBN 978-81-7017-416-5
- Wink, André (2002). "From the Mediterranean to the Indian Ocean: Medieval History in Geographic Perspective". Comparative Studies in Society and History. 44 (3): 416–45. doi:10.1017/s001041750200021x (inactive 14 May 2026). JSTOR 3879375. S2CID 144649820.
