= Togtokhtör wang =

Bat-Ochiryn Togtokhtör (Mongolian: Бат-очирын Тогтохтөр, 15 September 1779 – 6 April 1868) known as To Wang (Mongolian: То ван) or as Hetsuu Wang Togtokhtör (Mongolian: Хэцүү ван Тогтохтөр) was a Mongolian nobleman and politician.

To Wang was the son of Bat-Ochir, the Zasag Noyan of the Khoshuu. At age 25, To Wang succeeded his father as the Noyan of the Khoshuu, was appointed Hebei Wang in 1839, and became leader of the Setsen Khan Aimag Assembly in 1859.

Prior to To Wang's rule, Tamsagbulag (located in modern-day Halhgol sum in Dornod aimag) had only one monastery. To Wang built several monasteries ("Соёлыг бадруулагч", "Хамгийг хамгаалагч"), and a palace as well as an artificial mountain, lake, dikes, and various establishments for metalwork, stone-masonry, carpentry, textile, and agriculture. Moreover, he doubled the number of livestock in the Khoshuu to 120,000. To Wang was instrumental to making Tamsagbulag a regional cultural center.

To Wang's "Хэбэй вангийн аж төрөх үйлийг заасан сургаал" (1853); a treatise on combining nomadic and sedentary living, is the first economics book published in Mongolia.

To Wang also compiled grammatical rules for the Mongolian script and published them as a textbook in the Khoshuu school.

To Wang died in 1868.
