= Krishnashram =

Swami Krishnāshram

Personal life
- Born: Paramēshwar Nāgar Vitthal, Karnataka
- Died: 1863(8th day of the month of Mārgashīrsha) Shirali, Karnataka
- Honors: Seventh guru of the Chitrapur Saraswat Brahmin community

Religious life
- Religion: Hinduism
- Philosophy: Shaivism; Vedanta

Religious career
- Teacher: Swami Vāmanāshram

Swami Krishnashram (Devanagari: कृष्णाश्रम्, Kṛ.sh. nā. śram) was the seventh Mathadhipati (head of the community or guru) of the Chitrapur Saraswat Brahmin community from 1839 to 1863.

Krishnashram was considered to be the patron saint of Shirali and its adjoining villages. The samādhi (shrine) of Krishnāshram is located at the Chitrapur Math in Shirali between the samādhis of Swami Parijnanashram II and Swami Keshavashram.

== Life ==
Krishnāshram was born Paramēshwar Nāgar in the small hamlet of Vitthal in Karnataka. He became the seventh Guru Parampara after Swami Vāmanāshram died on the 9th day of the month of Kartik in 1839.

Krishnāshram was an administrator and a scholar of Sanskrit. Devotees came from different parts of the country to hear his discourses, including some from Dvaita Vaishnava practices.

He added several land assets to the Chitrapur Math.

=== Shishya Sweekār ===
On the 15th day of the month of Kārtik in 1857, Krishnāshram ordained Kālappa Shāntapayya, a boy from Mangalore, as his shishya (disciple or successor) and named him Pāndurangāshram. Pāndurangāshram studied under Krishnāshram for six years.

=== Death ===
Krishnāshram fell ill in 1863 and died on the eighth day of the month of Mārghashīrsha. Pandurangāshram succeeded him as the next guru of the community.

== Accomplishments ==
=== Infrastructural development ===
Krishnāshram was keenly interested in establishing temples and mathas and renovating already existing ones. Under his leadership, the Shri Subramanyeshwar Temple at Sirsi and the Shri Anantēshwar Temple at Vitthal were renovated.

The Umā-Maheshwar Temple at Mulki was constructed after the residents of that panchayat requested Krishnāshram for a temple. Krishnāshram himself installed the Umā-Maheshwar deity in the temple.

=== Rathōtsav ("Chariot or Car Festival") ===
Under Krishnāshram's auspices, the Chariot or Car Festival known as Rathōtsav was introduced in 1862. In this week-long festival, Lord Bhavānishankara adorns the Ratha, which hundreds of devotees pull around the village. The Mathādhipati sits on the ratha. An integral part of the festival is the pālki utsav (Palanquin festival) where the Lord Bhavānishankara adorns the pālki (palanquin) and travels a different route every day to "visit" his devotees. Devotees offer their prayers and seek blessings from the Lord on these days. The route taken is always marked by glowing lights and crackers.

This festivity is marked by the chanting of Vedic mantrās (hymns) along with bhajans (devotional songs). Prasād bhojan is served to the devotees. This food is prepared by volunteers. Any small work done towards the betterment of the festival is considered seva (selfless service) to Lord Bhavānishankara. The Rathōtsav is the time when the entire community unites to take part in the festivity.

== Miracles ==
Several miracles have been attributed to Swami Krishnāshram.

=== Un-earthing Umā-Maheshwar ===
Krishnāshram had a dream in which the Lord Bhavānishankara guided him to the jungles of Gersappe in Shimōga. There, he was shown an idol of Umā-Maheshwar hidden in the deep jungle. Krishnāshram guided his followers to the place as shown in his dream, where a sculpture of Umā-Maheshwar was unearthed.

This idol was installed near the shrine (samādhi) of Ādi Parijñānāshram Swamiji at the Bhandikeri Math (Ādi Matha) in Gokarn.

=== Fire at Shirali ===
One year, during the pāliki utsav in the month of Kārtik at Shirali, the people ignored the festival. They did not light lamps nor offer flowers or ārtis to the Lord.

Krishnāshram wanted the people to believe that whatever they offered to the Lord was not theirs but belonged to the Lord in the first place. That night, a devastating fire which could not be put out swept across Shirali. The people realized their folly and sought forgiveness at Krishnāshram's feet. As if by divine intervention, the fire was extinguished.

Preceded by Swami Vāmanāshram	Guru of Sāraswats; 1839 – 1863	Succeeded by Swami Pāndurangāshram
