= Parijnanashram III =

Swami Parijñānāshram III

Personal life
- Born: Ravīndra Shankarnārāyan Shukla (Bhat); June 15, 1947 Shirali, Karnataka
- Died: August 29, 1991 (aged 44) Bangalore, Karnataka
- Honors: TENTH guru of the Sāraswats; Social and technical advancements in community *First guru to travel abroad

Religious life
- Religion: Hinduism
- Philosophy: Shaivism

Religious career
- Teacher: Swami Ānandāshram

Swami Parijnanashram III (Devanagari: परिजनाश्रम, Pa.ri.jñā.nā.śram; June 15, 1947 – August 29, 1991) was the tenth guru of the Chitrapur Saraswat Brahmin community. He succeeded his teacher Swami Ānandāshram in 1966 after the latter died.

Swami Parijñānāshram III was one who had a keen thirst for knowledge - be it Vedic or technical. His progressive outlook resulted in large scale development which gave the community and its head matha (Monastery) - The Chitrāpur Matha the financial stability it needed. He aimed at making the Chitrapur village a self-sustaining viable township with an agricultural, industrial and commercial life of its own with an underlying spiritual base. His progressive outlook also included compassion. Under his regime, several health-care facilities were developed. He was an animal lover and constructed deer parks, top quality cow-sheds and regularly visited and cared for the animals there.

He was a person who was highly interested in technical spheres of knowledge. He possessed a first grade Ham Radio license (Probably the first religious saint to possess such a license in India). Under gis regime, a wireless station and an observatory post were established near Shirali. He kept a keen interest in archaeology and established an Archeology museum at Chitrapur. His sense of compassion was well known by people both within and outside the community. He would visit devotees in hospitals regularly irrespective of status or wealth.

This development oriented mindset was something that was usually never anticipated from a religious figure. This progressive outlook did not go well with certain orthodox members of society. Swami Parijñānāshram felt restrained by the lack of acceptance from certain sections of society and which finally resulted in his abdication of the post of the gead of Chitrapur Math (Mathādhipati) in 1979. He relinquished the title of the head of the Community fully by 1981. After this, he travelled all across India and even went abroad (The first guru of the community to do so), before he settled down in a matha constructed under his regime, at Karla. He continued his service for the welfare of the people even though he was not Mathādhipati of the community. This allowed him to extend his welfare programs to the down-trodden people irrespective of community, caste, creed or status.

Swami Parijñānāshram died on August 29, 1991, while he was staying at Bangalore. His body was later flown to Karla where his samādhi is situated (at the Karla Math). He had not accepted a shishya (Disciple) to succeed him as the head of the community.

== Early days ==
Swami Parijñānāshram was born to Shantābai and Shankarnārāyan Laxman Shukla (Bhat) on June 15, 1947, at Shirali in Karnataka. He was named Ravīndra Shankarnārāyan Shukla (Bhat). He did his primary schooling till the age of 6 at Shirali, under the watchful eyes of the incumbent head of the community Swami Ānandāshram. Even before he was born, his mother Shāntabai claims to have known that her offspring was Divine, even while she was pregnant. Claims include she having dreams like the Vision of a 7 hooded serpent, the impulse to offer her offspring to Lord Bhavānishankar during the aarti and so on.

In 1953, Shankarnārāyan Shukla (Bhat) and his family shifted to Mumbai where the education of young Ravīndra was done at Poddar High School, Santa Cruz in Mumbai. He studied there till he was ordained to be the shishya of Anandashram Swami. As a child he was an avid collector of stamps and coins- a hobby he pursued even after becoming the head of the community.

== Ordination ==
At the age of 12, Parijnanashram was chosen by the incumbent guru Anandashram Swami to be his shishya (disciple). He was ordained as the successor to Swami Ānandāshram in a grand ceremony of initiation as a disciple at Shivaji Park, Mumbai on March 1, 1959. At this ceremony, he was christened Parijñānāshram. This ceremony was attended by over 10,000 devotees. The religious heads of other Saraswat mathas were present at the ceremony and they blessed him too.

He studied under his guru for a long period of 7 years until Swami Ānandāshram attained Mahā-samādhi on September 16, 1966. After the Mahā-samādhi, he took over as the sovereign head of the community of Sāraswats. This long period of tutelage under his guru allowed Parijñānāshram to attain a great command over the Sanskrit scriptures. He toured along with his guru everywhere and thus could attain hands-on experience in the matters of spirituality as well as administration.

== Developmental activities ==
Swamiji took charge of the finances of the matha and used it for large scale developmental projects. These projects were not just aimed at social development but also technical improvements. His eagerness to make the various institutions under the community self-sufficient was his ultimate aim. So that way, even if the generosity of the community waned, the institutions would not suffer.

=== Social development schemes ===
There were a number of social development schemes executed under the aegis of Swamiji. He was responsible for the restarting of the Rathōtsav ("Car Festival") in 1973 which had been suspended for 35 years due to financial insecurity. Other ventures included the construction of housing societies, starting an institution for the physically and mentally challenged children as well as construction of temples and a matha.

- Reviving the Rathōtsav:
  The Rathōtsav or Car Festival was a gala celebration which united the entire community. This was suspended indefinitely by Swami Ānandāshram due to the financial situation that had crippled the community.
  Under Swamiji's reign, the Rathōtsav was revived in 1973 as the financial position of the matha was strong. Over 2000 people attended the Rathōtsav of 1973.
- Ānandāshraya:
  This was a shelter for the aged built at Shirali close to the Chitrapur Math. It was completed on March 30, 1980, and could house around 40 couples. This was a promise that Swamiji had given to his guru. The cost of its construction was initially put by Swamiji through his personal funds. The remainder was from money collected from the philanthropic members of the community.

Ānandāshraya provided these "orphaned" elders a place to stay and enjoy the last days of their lives with love, dignity and self-respect. They could attend all the activities at the Chitrapur Math which helped quell their spiritual desires.

- Swami Parijnanashram Educational and Vocational Centre for the Handicapped:
  This institute was a vocational training cum school for children who were physically and mentally challenged. This was established in Bolinj, in the suburb of Virār, Mumbai. It initially provided vocational training for 60 children (Aged between 3-18) under 5 different departments viz.: The Deaf and Mute; The Mute/Speech Impaired; The Physically Challenged; The blind; The Mentally Challenged.

This was a unique project pursued by Swamiji after his abdication. This institute was a revolutionary project completed in conjecture with the State and Central Government on October 31, 1985. It is an actively functioning institution which runs on funds from the Government and large number of charitable institutions/individuals. It can now accommodate 302 children who are given training in life skills by 56 professionally trained teachers.

See their webpage here

- Development at Karla:

The Jnānānand ashram (Karla Matha)

Swamiji personally supervised in the construction of an ashram by name Jñānānand in the town of Kārla in Maharashtra. He used this as a retreat while touring in Maharashtra and eventually as his abode after his abdication. He also constructed a temple for goddess Durga called the Sri Durga Paramēshwari Mata Madir. The samādhi (Shrine) of Swamiji is also located at Karla.

- Shāntisukhada:
  Shāntisukhada was an organization founded under the aegis of Swamiji that was aimed at woman empowerment. Poor and destitute women of the village of Malavali in Maharashtra were provided with free sewing machines and imparted with training in tailoring so as to make them financially self-sufficient.
- Parijñānāshraya:
  This was a housing colony of cottages built by the Kanara Saraswat Association (See here) at the Panchavati hills nearby. It gave the members of the community a place to stay in amidst serene surroundings. This housing scheme was built on the lines of the houses at the Tirupati (Tirumala) hills.
- Renovation of Panchavati temple:
  The temple constructed by Swami Pāndurangāshram on the Panchavati hills near Shirali by the name Panchavati Dhyān Mandir was renovated. Besides the renovation of the main structure, gardens blooming with roses and cacti were laid around the temple.
- Establishment of Deer park at Govardhan Hillock:
  Swamiji, being an animal lover, supervised the establishment of a deer park atop the Govardhan hillock which is close to Shirali. This deer park is now a tourist attraction. Moreover, the trees planted in the deer park have become home to several species of birds and can be a haven for bird watchers too.

=== Other developmental projects ===
The other projects undertaken during the regime of Swamiji were aimed at commercial, industrial and technical progress. The main project was the Chitrapur Gram Vikas Yojna (Chitrapur village development scheme). Other projects have been mentioned below:

- Chitrāpur Gram Vikās Yojana (Chitrapur Village Development Scheme):

This was a project that aimed at making Chitrapur Village a self-sufficient viable township with a blend of agricultural, commercial and industrial life with an underlying base of spirituality. This project aimed at utilising the land around the Chitrapur Math for socio-economic development. The various sub-projects that resulted from this Scheme are:

  - Development of cottage industries: Cottage industries like Printing press, Handlooms, Power looms, Small-scale mills etc. were started. Funds were allocated for the establishment of new industries as well as for upgrading of existing ones. These cottage industries provided a regular source of employment for the people and the profits from these industries produced a constant source of income for the matha as well.
  - Encouragement of agriculture: The Gram Vikas Scheme regularly allocated funds for improving agriculture in the regions owned by the matha. Use of better fertilizers, improving quality of grains sowed etc. were parts of this agenda. The property at Kembre and Bengre farms were utilized which resulted in the matha attaining self-sufficiency in terms of rice, vegetables and coconuts.
  - Improvement in Dairy farming: The cowsheds under the matha were modernized. The sheds were made larger, more roomy and airy for the cattle. Investments were made to purchase better Gujarati Surti cattle which provided more milk. The quality of feed given was also improved.
- Archaeology Museum at Shirali:
  Swamiji had a keen interest in archaeology and history. He personally created a museum of archaeology with many rare artifacts and idols that he had collected. This museum was opened in 1974 and provided the people a glimpse into the world of archaeology.
- Wireless station and observatory post at Panchavati Hills:

Once on his visit to the Panchavati Hills near Shirali, the weather became very cyclonic. He noticed two fishermen trying to battle the cyclonic conditions in the Arabian Sea but they failed after their boat capsized and they drowned. This incident deeply hurt Swamiji as he was helpless and could not help the fishermen. Thus came the idea of starting a wireless station at Pachavati that could be used for communication in times of emergency.
A wireless transmitter-receiver station was established with the help of people like Badakere Dutt, Kallianpur Ramanand etc. An observatory post was also established which was staffed all throughout the day and night, to guide ships and boats through the jagged rocks that adorn the coastline of Shirali, especially at night. Swamiji also studied and obtained a first grade amateur radio license within a period of 3 months of applying for it, a task that is difficult by normal standards. He was probably the first sanyasi to obtain such a license. He was also an active user of the amateur radio.

- Commercial complex in Bangalore:
  A large tract of land around the Chitrapur Math, Bangalore was being under-utilized. Swamiji established a project that would result in the construction of a residential and commercial complex. Once the project was completed, it provided the matha an income to the tune of Rupees 8 lakh (Rs.800,000). This amount, which has multiplied over the years, is still a source of good income.
- Updating library:
  The library in Chitrapur Math was refurnished and updated. It acquired many rare Sanskrit books regarding a variety of religious subjects. Many new books too were acquired. The whole library was properly catalogued and books maintained in an orderly manner with proper connotations and captions.
- Travel abroad:
  Swamiji and his retinue of priests travelled to the US and UK to show the members of the community settled there, the rituals and culture of the community. He carried along with him an idol of Lord Bhavānishankara, the principle deity of the community. This brought the community abroad closer to the matha.

== Opposition and abdication ==
Swami Parijñānāshram's regime was filled with lots of opposition from many quarters. His dynamic and progressive outlook was something that was never expected from a sanyasi like him. The large scale industrial, commercial and technical development did not go well with certain orthodox sections of the society, especially certain people within the Chitrapur Math. This group tried to mobilise support against Swamiji and thus created a rift within the community. Two sections emerged - those supporting Swamiji and those against.

Tired of all the opposition and accusations he had to face, Swamiji graciously relinquished the title of Mathādhipati or head of the matha and community by 1981. Certain aspects that caused the criticism and opposition are mentioned as follows:

- Constant court cases against him: Swamiji had to face many court cases filed against him. The basis of these cases was the Chitrapur Math Trust deed, which was very weak in the sense that he was the sole trustee. This meant that anybody could find any small fault in the execution of developmental programs under the trust and the blame would fall on him. Swamiji came clean in all these court cases. The fact that a guru of a community had to go through trial in court cases, resulted in a character assassination of sorts.
- Total control over finances: It came to the notice of Swamiji that some members, who were part of the matha, were involved in swindling the money generated from various activities of the matha. In order to prevent such financial misgivings, he took total charge over the finances of the matha. Moreover, he stopped certain rituals like Pādukapooja (pooja of the wooden sandals of the Guru) to prevent the money offered by devotees from being kept by the priests for their own needs.
- Restriction of Trusts and schemes: Swamiji was a person who wanted to help people of every community and not just the Chitrapur Saraswat Brahmin Community. Most schemes for welfare development were bound by trusts and schemes that allowed the benefit to go only to the members of that community alone. He wanted to be a true Jagadguru (Jagad = World + guru= Teacher). Thus he found discontentment in these projects and is cited as his chief reason to relinquish the title.
- Starting Archeology Museum: Swamiji had a very keen acumen regarding archeology and hence wanted the people at Shirali and rest of the community to understand the beauty of archeology. For that purpose he planned to start an archeology museum at Shirali. Certain members of the community opposed this plan citing reasons like Idols of Gods (that were displayed at the museum) should not be used for purposes of entertainment and public display. Moreover, the funds used for that project could be used for other purposes. Swamiji was adamant with his decision which resulted in the museum being completed in 1974. This caused tensions within the administration of the matha.
- Restarting of Rathōtsav during times of drought: The Rathōtsav was restarted under Swamiji's wishes in 1973. There was a difference in opinion about the time of restarting of the Car festival or Rathōtsav. The region was facing droughts and this festival will mean thousands of people turning up and staying at Shirali for 3–4 days at a stretch. But Swamiji's ardent desire prevailed and thus the festival was restarted. During the Sādhana Saptāha (Week of Sadhana- See Sādhana Saptāha) in Bombay in 1972 he told the community that the reasons for starting the festival was not much because of the improved financial condition of the matha nor the large number of people wanting it restarted. The principal objective was, Swamiji stressed, that the lore of the rites, rituals and essential forms of the Rathōtsav ceremonies was within full knowledge of only a limited number of priests, and with disuse, this knowledge would dwindle, leading possibly to ultimate extinction. He even hinted that he had plans to restart the festival in 1969 but could not because of certain pressures.

Swamiji was tired of the constant opposition he faced. So as an act of grace, he did the ultimate sacrifice (Tyāga) of relinquishing the title of head of the community and the matha by 1981. This was reminiscent of the Tyāga made by Swami Vāmanāshram.

== The Mahasabha of 1989 ==
On December 24, 1989, the Mahasabha (grand gathering/meeting) of the Sāraswats took place at Mumbai where Swamiji made his position regarding becoming the mathādhipati very clear to the community. He wanted the community to be one and the divisions to be mended. Swamiji had received several letters asking him to go back to become the head of the community. This was so that the Guru parampara could be continued if he accepted a shishya (disciple). He stated that some people still considered him as an excommunicated guru and any disciple of his too would be considered as excommunicated.

Later the Mahasabha reached the conclusion that the guru parampara would be continued by that person whom Swamiji had accepted as a shishya (disciple) and that any other person anointed as the head of the community would not be part of the original Guru Parampara that started in 1708.

Given below are parts of the āshirvachan (spiritual discourse) Swamiji gave to the Mahasabha. The statements in parentheses are not part of the original lecture but added to give more information to the reader.

Regarding Mathadhipatya, We have been receiving hundreds and thousands of letters praying that We should resume Mathadhipatya. On the other hand, We have also been receiving a few letters (108) damning Us as Brishta Sanyasi (Excommunicated sanyasi) and that they would take every step to prevent Us from becoming a Mathadhipati of Shri Chitrapur Math. Lord Shiva is as fond of Sahasranāmavali (Sahasranama-Set of 1000 or more names of a God ) as of Ashtōttara (Collection of 8 names of a God). This Mahasabha should decide whether Swamiji should act as per the Sahasranāmavali or the Ashtōttara. To our mind, if you want the Parampara founded by Adi Parijnanashram to continue, then we should come back as Mathadhipati. Even if we are to be Chitrapur Math Mathadhipati, we would not interfere with the administration. It is only when we as Mathadhipati initiate a Shishya that the present Guruparampara founded by Adi Parijnanashram Swamiji will continue. Or else any Shishya initiated by any other Mathadhipati will be starting a new parampara and the old one will end with Us. This parampara has lasted for over 200 years. Now if a Shishya initiated by any other Mathadhipati is accepted, you will be breaking the parampara founded by Adi Parijnanashram Swamiji and in any case it will not be the original Bhanap parampara. Even if we want to be the Mathadhipati, we have no desire to stay in Shirali. So the only purpose of our agreeing to come back as Mathadhipati is to enable the continuation of our present Guruparampara. If we were to initiate a boy as it is into sanyās, the same persons might call him as Brishta and prevent him from being Mathadhipati and hence Our wish to resume Mathadhipatya; otherwise We have no desire to be the Mathadhipati. Unfortunately some people have misinterpreted this in their own way. Let the Mahasabha decide on this question. We shall abide by its decision.

The Mahasabha then recorded a resolution:

RESOLVED that the only way to continue the present parampara founded by Adi Parijnanashram Swamiji is to install H.H.Parijnanashram Swamiji III as the Mathadhipati and accept a Shishya initiated by him. Further RESOLVED that as per tradition, custom and usage, Chitrapur Saraswat community has accepted only that Shishya who has been initiated by our own Guru and in view of this tradition, it is our resolve that no other Shishya who is initiated by any other Sanyasi will be acceptable to the community.

Despite these decisions, the Kshamāyāchana (Letter of forgiveness) by members of the Karla Math (People who were strong supporters of Swamiji) to the present head of the Chitrapur Math, Swami Sadyojāt Shankarāshram in 2005, led to the mending of relations between the two sections of the community. Moreover, Swami Sadyojāt Shankarāshram accepted Swami Parijnānāshram III as his guru. (See Mending of relationships)

== Death ==
After abdication, Swamiji settled down at the Jnānānand, an ashram he had constructed in the town of Karla in Maharashtra. He continued his pursuits of welfare, but with the freedom of extending it to all people irrespective of creed, caste or status. The Vocational Centre at Virar and the Shāntisukhada are proof in that respect.

On August 27, 1991, Swamiji, suddenly left for Bangalore to be at the Chitrapur Math there, the place where his Guru Swami Ānandāshram had died. Two days later, on August 29, 1991, Swami Parijñānāshram III died at the young age of 44.

He had not accepted a shishya (disciple) to succeedhim as the head of the community and continue the Guru Parampara as a result of the discontentment some people in the community had against him. He felt that any shishya adopted by him might not be accepted by those same people. The samādhi of Swami Parijñānāshram III is located next to the Durga Parameshwari Temple at Karla.

== Miracles ==
Two miracles have been observed at the temple at Karla after Swamiji's death. They are listed below:

- Opening of the samādhi (shrine) during renovation:
  Swamiji's samādhi (Shrine) is situated near the Durga Parameshawari Temple at Karla. But for the shrine to be completed, a Shiv-linga was to be installed. So during February/March 1993 the samādhi slab was removed. To the surprise of everyone, the Marigold flowers and the tulsi leaves that had been placed over the body of Swamiji was still very fresh. Swamiji's scalp and hair was intact as well despite being interred for nearly 18 months.
- Goddess Durga and Lord Shankara appearing in flames:
  Many devotees have claimed to have witnessed the image of Goddess Durga along with Lord Shankar in the flames of the Homam (Ritual where offerings are placed into fire, usually offerings to lord Agni. The picture of the Gods appearing in the flame can be seen here. This photograph was taken on 28 January 2001.

== Notes ==
Preceded by Swami Ānandāshram	Guru of the Sāraswats; 1966 – 1991	Succeeded by Swami Sadyōjāt Shankarāshram
