= Anandashram Swami =

Swami Ānandāshram

Personal life
- Born: Shāntamūrti Haridās Bhat; 29 June 1902 Shirali, Karnataka
- Died: 16 September 1966 (aged 64) Bangalore, Karnataka
- Honors: NINTH guru of the Sāraswats *Large scale infrastructural development *Consolidation of the community

Religious life
- Religion: Hinduism
- Philosophy: Shaivism

Religious career
- Teacher: Swami Pāndurangāshram, Swami Krishnāchārya Saraswati

Swami Ānandāshram (Devanagari: आनंदाश्रम्, Ā.nan.dā.śram) was the ninth guru and the head of the community of the Chitrapur Saraswats. He succeeded his guru Swami Pandurangashram in 1915. He remained the head of the community for a period of 51 years until he died in 1966.

Swami Ānandāshram had to work on his own to attain mastery over the Sanskrit scriptures, as he had been initiated just 9 days after his ordination as a shishya (disciple). Thus he had no time to learn under the tutelage of a guru. His learning was taken care of mostly by the priests of Chitrapur Math along with special tutors.

His regime was characterised by progress and prosperity of the community after initial periods of financial instability. Swami Ānandāshram regularly visited the various centres of the community all over the country without restricting himself to the Kanara districts. Under his regime the strict social norms enforced by his predecessor, Swami Pāndurangāshram were made more lenient.

He died in 1966 and was succeeded by his shishya (disciple) Swami Parijñānāshram III. His samādhi (shrine) is located at Shirali within the premises of the Chitrapur Math.

== Initial period ==
Swami Ānandāshram was born Shāntamūrti Haridās Bhat to one of the priests in the Chitrapur Math by name Haridas Rāmchandra Bhat and his wife Jānakidevi on 29 June 1902. Swami Pāndurangāshram had accepted Shāntamoorthy as his shishya (disciple) on 5 June 1915 just nine days before he attained Mahā-samādhi (died). Swami Ānandāshram was ordained as the head of the community on 14 June 1915 at the age of 13. Thus he had the sole sovereignty over the community with no time to learn, among other things: Sanskrit Scriptures, administrative responsibilities, etc. under the tutelage of a guru.

Swami Pāndurangāshram had foreseen the difficulty his disciple might have to face and so ordered that the administrative duties of the matha and the community should not be given to him until he had received due education and necessary training. Until then, the administrative responsibilities would be taken care of by the Shukla Bhats of the matha (See Shukla Bhats). The community would continue to worship the pāduka (wooden slippers worn by Hindu saints) of Swami Pāndurangāshram till Swami Ānandāshram attained the required training.

The general education of Swamiji was taken care of by the priests in the Chitrapur Matha. Special tutors were arranged for teaching specific scriptures. However, Swamiji had to teach himself many of the previously mentioned qualities. Twice he was overcome with frustration and he left the premises of the matha without anyone's knowledge, to take up life of a sanyasi (ascetic) and to quench his thirst for knowledge. Both times he returned upon the urgent requests of his devotees who promised him that things at the matha would be fine.

In 1927, Swamiji set out for Rishikesh, located at the foothills of the Himalayas, to the ashram (Hermitage) of Swami Krishnāchārya Saraswati under whom he studied for many days. Under him, Swamiji learnt the Brahma sūtras and other texts. Swami Krishnāchārya later visited Shirali and continued to teach him.

== Financial Crisis ==
During the initial period of Swamiji's reign, the Chitrapur Math faced acute financial constraints. The income for the matha was steadily decreasing. The matha faced a huge debt of 80,000 Rupees with the interests alone absorbing 5,000 Rupees (a considerable amount in the early 1930s). The severe financial restrictions were possibly due to:

- The start of World War II
- Severe drought conditions in the Kanara districts (and the country in general)
- Financial burden due to the last period of India's Freedom struggle.

Tackling this financial situation was given a top priority by Swamiji. The measures included Suspension of the Rathōtsav (Car Festival), Introduction of Sādhana Saptāhas and the framing of a new constitution.

=== Suspension of the Rathōtsav ===
This time of financial shortcomings forced Swamiji to suspend the annual car festival (Rathōtsav) indefinitely. The Rathōtsav, despite being a celebration that united the community, would always guzzle a large portion of the matha's funds. Suspension of the festival seemed to him the only logical solution to the rapidly deteriorating financial situation.

Instead a Sādhana Saptāha (week of prayer) was introduced. This event was held during a week in December every year (Usually 24 December to 30 December). This event took place every year at Shirali, Bangalore or Bombay: wherever Swamiji happened to be present.

=== Sādhana Saptāha ===
The Sādhana Saptāha was first introduced on 24 December 1940, which coincided with the Silver Jubilee of the ordination of Swamiji. This event would be held every year except for short breaks needed because of rice shortages or the Government's restriction of public gatherings.

The week would consist of bhajans (devotional songs), Āshirvachans (Spiritual discourses) and Satsangs. Similar such public functions had been held under the aegis of Swami Sivananda at Benaras and in the mathas under Mata Ananda Mayi. The Sādhana Saptāha gave the community time to self-reflect and thus help with the community's enlightenment.

=== New Constitution ===
The society's elders decided that a constitution and a regular set of rules were needed for the administration of the matha and to help it overcome financial constraints. In 1932, a representative Mahā-sabha (Mahā=Grand, sabha= gathering/meeting) was held at Shirali. This laid the solid foundation for cooperation between members of the community.

Under H. Shankar Rau and others, a constitution was framed that regulated expenditure. The Standing committee recommended that the Rathōtsav be suspended. Important milestones achieved during the decade from 1935 to 1944 can be briefly stated as follows:

- Collection of ₹100,000 (a considerable sum at the time) to liquidate old debts and reconstruct old buildings (1937).
- Allowing temple entry to Harijans and other members of society.
- Establishment of various funds, each aimed at a particular cause (Developmental Activities).
- Suspension of the Rathōtsav (Car festival) and introduction of the Sādhana Saptāha.

Notable throughout this decade was that the Standing Committee was not just a body that passed resolutions, but also followed up on those resolutions with hard work. This period of toil helped the matha regain the stability (both economic and moral) it had lost.

== Consolidation of the community ==
The community in general had become distanced under the strict regime of Swami Pāndurangāshram. He had insisted on everyone strictly adhering to the Dharma. Moreover, he had excommunicated anyone who went abroad or associated with anyone who went abroad. People who married outside the community were also excommunicated.

Under Swami Ānandāshram, many social reforms were introduced. He allowed the community to go abroad without any fear of expulsion. Moreover, most of the people who were excommunicated by Swami Pāndurangāshram on grounds of foreign travel or marriage outside of the community were accepted back to the community.

The community had lived in the Kanara districts of Karnataka till the end of the 19th century. In search of greener pastures, the young generation migrated to the urban areas of Bombay, Bangalore, Madras, Delhi and Calcutta. Their busy schedules and other commitments resulted in the urban community drifting away from the Chitrapur Math. Swamiji travelled to all these urban areas and drew members of the community closer.

This revival of interest in the Guru Parampara and the Chitrapur Math may have happened as a result of several factors:

- Economic Depression: During the early 1900s, the economic condition of the urban areas began to look bleak. Employment was scarce and there was no job security. This was a time when the people realized they wanted spiritual guidance from a guru. This might have encouraged a sense of spiritual belonging.
- Encouragement from parents: When the younger generation migrated, they took their parents with them. These aged parents longed for the re-establishment of relations with the community. The older generation encouraged the younger generation to take part in the activities of the matha. This also contributed to the integration of the community under Swami Ānandāshram.

== Developmental Activities ==
Swami Ānandāshram's regime was one that gave high priority to reconstruction and renovation of old buildings that were in dilapidated conditions. Various funds were established that helped serve different purposes (either for the establishment of certain institutions or for renovations). The various developmental activities will be mentioned in brief.

=== Establishment of Funds ===
Some of the funds introduced for developmental activities were as follows:

- Vantiga Capital Fund: The main Vantiga (Donation) fund was established in a centralized manner whereby Vantiga revenues would flow directly into this fund. This was the capital corpus fund used for (among other things) the daily expenditure of the Chitrapur Math. The hard work put in by the Standing Committee helped the Vantiga fund to increase manyfolds. The rise in 1954 alone was by around Rs.40,000 which resulted in the total fund reaching Rs.4.66lakh.
- Religious Instruction Fund and Priest Subsidy Fund: These funds were used to re-establish a Sanskrit School (Pāthshāla) and the Priest training centre in Shirali. The Subsidy provided basic rations and amenities at subsidised rates for the priests in the Chitrapur Math.
- Social Amelioration Fund: This fund was established during the first Sādhana-saptāha in 1940, which aimed at collecting money for the smooth managing of Social functions like satsangs, āshiravachans (Spiritual discourses), etc. This was for the general social betterment of the community.

=== Reconstruction and Renovation ===
Swamiji personally took charge of various reconstruction and renovation projects needed for the buildings that belonged to the community. 3 major renovation/reconstruction projects are mentioned as follows:

- Ādi matha: Major renovation work was undertaken at the Bhandikeri Math at Gokarn. This included the consecration of the samādhi (shrine) of Ādi Parijñānāshram. Concrete reinforcements were made to the existing structure. The whole sanctum sanctorum of the temple was reconstructed. Many such changes were brought about.
- Shri Ganapati Temple, Mallāpur: A community hall was built and the inner chamber of the temple was reconstructed. Massive renovations were made to the entire structure of the very old temple.
- Shri Chitrapur Math, Bangalore: Under the auspices of Swamiji, some land was purchased in Malleshwaram, Bangalore and a matha (Monastery) was constructed. Initially it was meant as a residence place for the devotees who came during various religious functions. Several reconstruction drives were held to convert this into a full-fledged matha. It was here that Swamiji ultimately attained Mahā-samādhi (died) in 1966.

=== Publications ===
Even though the Chitrapur Math had been publishing books on its own since 1896, it became a "true" publishing house under Swamiji. There are a number of books that have been published. See List of books.

- Chitrapur Sunbeam: With the blessings of Swamiji, The Chitrapur Sunbeam (Chitrapur Ravikiran) was published. This was a periodical that had the following aims:

1. Propagation of Dharma
2. Publication of the Matha accounts, news and other notes
3. A means of periodical contact between the matha and the "little community which created the matha"
See Sunbeam Archives

- Directory of Vantiga Payers: There is an annual published directory which lists all the vantiga donors. This gives a comprehensive list of all the members of the community in and outside of India who regularly donate to the matha. Till 1978 this was part of the first issue of the 'Chitrapur Sunbeam'. After 1978, it has been printed as a separate volume.

== Miracles ==
Swami Ānandāshram's involvement is attributed to many miracles. Some of the miracles are described below. These instances and many more are found in the Birth Centenary edition of H.H. Shrimat Anandashram Swamiji (June/July 2002) of the Chitrapur Sunbeam (Chitrapur Ravikiran) where devotees themselves have given accounts of their experiences with Swamiji.

=== Tiger makes way ===
This is the most well known miracle attributed to Swamiji. One night, Swamiji and his retinue of people were going to Āgumbe Ghat. They were traversing through dense jungles with Swamiji at the wheel of the car. Suddenly from nowhere a full-grown tiger sprawled across the road and came to a stop right in front of Swamiji's car. Sounding of horns and flashing of the headlights did not bother the tiger which stayed rooted to the spot.

With no way to drive the tiger away, Swamiji got out of the car from the driver's seat. All the attendants in the car got the shock of their lives at the sight they saw. Swamiji went to the tiger with a calm disposition and gently whispered in its ears "We have to reach our destination. Will you please make way?". The tiger slithered away into the jungle without making a sound. Swamiji came back to the car and drove away as if nothing had happened.

=== Visitor from Madras ===
When Swamiji was in Bangalore, a visitor from Madras had come to meet him after hearing about his greatness. But Swamiji's health was not good, and so he was not allowed to meet Swamiji. Instead, he thought he could go to Puttaparthi. Eventually, he decided to continue on his visit to meet Sathya Sai Baba.

This man went ahead and met Sai Baba. He was in for a surprise when instead of Vibhuti (Sacred Ash which is normally given to devotees who meet up with Sai Baba), he was given akshata (rice coated with vermillion- usually given by the guru of the Sāraswats to the devotees who meet up with them). This incident made the man rush back to Bangalore to meet up with Swami Ānandāshram. When he was called on by the Swamiji, he was stunned to see that with the customary coconut, he received a packet of Vibhuti instead of the akshata given to all other devotees.

=== Devotee from Kolhapur ===
There lived a man in Kolhapur who had a very devout younger sister. She had been widowed with a young son and a newly born baby. She had been distressed and had to live with her brother. One night, she had a dream where she could hear the footsteps of Swamiji at the stairs. She was overjoyed and went to bring a chair for Swamiji to sit when she realized it was just a dream. The dream had significance since her brother had gone to Shirali during the Navratri celebrations.

When her brother was called by Swamiji to receive the Phalmantrākshat (Phal=fruit + mantra= prayer+ akshat= rice smeared with vermillion - the Swamiji offers his devotees these 3 items as prasad), the Swamiji gave him his Pādukas(Wooden slippers worn by Hindu Saints) to be given to his sister who was in distress. The man had not even mentioned to the Swamiji that he had a sister. With tears in his eyes, he accepted the Pādukas and gave them to his sister on his return home.

== Shishya Sweekar ==
In 1959, the devotees suggested the Swamiji to accept a shishya (disciple) so that the sacred Guru Parampara could continue. Swamiji accepted. So the search began to find a suitable successor to Swamiji.

That successor was found in Ravīndra Shankarnārāyan (Shukla) Bhat, the 12-year-old son of Shāntābai and Shankarnārāyan Laxman Bhat. The momentous day for the Shishya Sweekār (Ceremony to accept a disciple) dawned on 1 March 1959. The location was Shivaji Park, Mumbai. The ceremony was attended by over 10,000 devotees, the largest ever gathering for a Shishya Sweekār ceremony. Swami Ānandāshram ordained his shishya as Parijñānāshram. He would study under his guru for a period of 7 years, after which he would succeed him as the head of the community in 1966, after Swamiji attained Mahā-samādhi (died).

== Death ==
Swamiji's health was failing in 1966. On 16 September 1966, Swami Ānandāshram died at the Shri Chitrapur Math in Malleshwaram, Bangalore with his shishya by his side. He was 64 years old.

After his death, his shishya Swami Parijñānāshram III became the sovereign head of the community. The samādhi of Swami Anandāshram is located within the premises of the Chitrapur Math next to that of his guru, Swami Pāndurangāshram.

Preceded by Swami Pāndurangāshram	Guru of the Sāraswats; 1915 – 1966	Succeeded by Swami Parijñānāshram III
