= Parijnanashram =

Parijnanashram may refer to the following gurus of the Chitrapur Saraswat Brahmins:

- Parijnanashram I, the first guru whose reign was from 1708 to 1720
- Parijnanashram II, the third guru whose reign was from 1757 to 1770
- Parijnanashram III, the tenth guru whose reign was from 1966 to 1991

== See also ==
- Chitrapur Saraswat Brahmin
