= Sadyojat Shankarashram =

Indian spiritual teacher

H.H. Sadyojat Shankarashram Swamiji

Personal life
- Born: 13 November 1964 (age 61) Mumbai, Maharashtra

Religious life
- Religion: Hinduism
- Philosophy: Advaita

Religious career
- Teacher: Swāmi Parijnānāshram III, Ishwaranand Giri Maharaj of Mount Abu, HH Narayananashram Swamiji, HH Jagatguru Shankarcharya of Shringeri.

Sadojyat Shankarashram is the spiritual leader of the Smarta tradition Chitrapur Saraswat Brahmin community of India, having ascended the Peetha (seat) in February 1997. He is the eleventh Mathadipathi (Head) of Chitrapur Math. It has its spiritual centre or 'math' at Shirali, Uttar Kannada district in Karnataka.

== Early life ==
The tenth Swamiji, Parijnanashram III had not appointed a successor (shishya), leaving the community uncertain. During this time, members learned of a Saraswat youth who had taken Sannyasa and was residing at Mount Abu. They invited him to assume the revered Peetha, and upon his acceptance and ascension, he became the eleventh Guru in this distinguished Chitrapur Guru Parampara.

== Works undertaken for community ==
In 2002, to promote the use of Sanskrit, the Swami established an educational initiative called Girvaana Pratishtha, which has since expanded to 18 centers across India and three overseas. A number of devotees have completed teacher training, 2,000 have passed the conversational examination, and 1,000 have cleared the theory exam.

In 2006, he initiated Prarthana Varga to instill strong samskaras and traditional values in children, helping them remain connected to and proud of their cultural heritage wherever they go. Today, these classes are conducted across 25 centres in India, the UK, Canada, the USA, Australia, and New Zealand. Over 70 volunteer teachers continuously develop engaging, interactive, and educational modules to ensure the weekly sessions remain lively and meaningful.

In 2008, Swamiji founded Chitrapur Yuvadhara, a youth wing of the community focused on engaging young members through spiritual camps (Shibirs), trekking, and Anusmaran (constant remembrance/contemplation) to bridge the gap between traditional values and modern life.

Srivali Trust, Parijnan Foundation, and SCM Charitable Trust were established to implement a range of social and educational initiatives. These efforts led to the establishment and revitalization of schools in Shirali, Mallapur, Karla, Mangaluru, and Kotekar. With a strong focus on rural development, particularly women’s empowerment, initiatives such as Parimochana and Samvit Sudha were launched and have since become key drivers of economic independence for many women in and around Shirali. The Handmade Paper Project factory in Kembre, entirely managed by women, was set up to promote rural employment, recycling, and environmental sustainability. The Parijnan Foundation has introduced the Samarth Bhanap Yojana, aimed at fostering entrepreneurship among young leaders of the community.
