= Shankarashram II =

Shankarāshram II

Personal life
- Born: Shukla Bhat (family) Shirali, Karnataka
- Died: 1785 (Shudha Tritiya day of the Maagha month) Mallapur, Karnataka
- Honors: Fourth Mathādhipati of Chitrāpur Sāraswats; Founded matha at Mallapur

Religious life
- Religion: Hinduism
- Philosophy: Shaivism

Religious career
- Teacher: Swami Parijñānāshram II

Swami Shankarāshram II (Devanagari: स्वामी शङकर्ाश्रम्, Swā.mi Śan.ka.rā.shram) was the fourth head guru or Mathādhipati (head of the matha or monastery) of the Chitrapur Saraswat Brahmin community. He reigned from 1770 to 1785.

He was a great scholar who was well versed with the Vedas and the Upanishads. His yogic powers were extraordinary and he was regarded and revered as an avatār (incarnation) of Lord Dattātreya (Da.t.tā.tre.ya). Very many miracles have been attributed to him (See Miracles). Many people in that period experienced that in case of difficulty, if they prayed earnestly for his help, his help never fails to come. He also founded the matha (monastery) at Mallāpur (Uttara Kannada District).

In this article henceforth Swamiji will refer to Swami Shankarāshram II.

== Pattābhishekha ("Crowning Ceremony") ==
Swami Shankarāshram was crowned as the head guru or Mathādhipati (Head of the Chitrapur Math) of the Sāraswats after the Mahā-samādhi (death) of his guru Swami Parijnānāshram II (on Ekadashi day of the Bhādrapad month in 1770).

During the Anushthān (ceremony), Swamiji was suffering from high fever due to Malaria. But his yogic powers were so great that he transferred his fever onto the danda (stick) that he carried so that the ceremony could be performed without inconvenience. Being the true Yogi that he was, after the ceremony, he transferred the sickness back onto him. When devotees asked him why he would not keep the illness in the danda permanently he replied "Even a Jnāni (All-knowing one) has to go through the ups and downs of life. Even the Lord ordains that and this is a fact of life."

Swamiji was a person who was always absorbed in spiritual pursuits. He was continuously seeking more knowledge so much so that he would neglect his health. His diet was frugal and he wished for only simple porridge (mostly as Bhikshāor meal offered by devotees).

== Shri Gurumath, Mallāpur ==
Under Swami Shankarāshram II, a new matha ('Monastery') was established in the hamlet of Kumta near Mallapur. This place is a small valley tucked away amidst lots of greenery. It was named Shri Gurumath. Swamiji started residing there after the construction was over.

Every day Swamiji would go for a walk in the mornings to Hoovinhittal a place near the Chandāvar village. There he would meditate for long hours in a garden that was full of jasmine flowers. Devotees would wait on the road-side for his darshan and blessings. Swamiji would randomly point to a devotee, who would then offer Swamiji bhiksha. Swamiji preferred simple porridge and some payasa (sweet rice pudding). The samādhi (shrine) of Swami Shankarāshram II is located in the premises of the Guru Matha.

Swamiji would constantly hold satsangs ("gatherings for discussions of the scriptures") at the Chitrapur Matha. Devotees would "flock to listen to the discourses filled with wisdom". Swamiji would educate all the people about the essence of the Indian scriptures.

== Shishya Sweekār ==
The frail health of Swamiji had the devotees anxious with fear. They requested Swamiji to choose a shishya (disciple) who would continue the Guru Parampara. So the search started for a suitable disciple. Eventually Swamiji chose a young man from the Kandlūr family to be his successor.

In the month of Maagha in 1781, Swamiji ordained the new shishya and named him Keshavāshram. Records say that the Shishya Sweekār ceremony took place at the Shri Ganapati Temple at Mallāpur.

== Miracles ==
Swami Shankarāshram has been attributed to many miracles. Two of the most popular ones are mentioned here.

=== The unfried Vadas ===
Swamiji preferred to have only porridge as his meals. But during the Punyatithī (death anniversary) of his guru, Swami Parijñānāshram II, his shishya (disciple) Keshavāshram asked the cooks not to prepare porridge. (It is customary in Sāraswat Brahmins tradition that during the death anniversary of a person, a grand feast is prepared and it is first eaten by crows. Crows are supposed be an embodiment of persons who have died and hence a grand feast is prepared to honour the ancestors).'

The shishya forgot to tell Swamiji about this. The cooks were preparing Vada but despite their efforts, the Vadas would stick to the bottom of the frying pan and just would not get fried. When Swamiji got to know of it, he said "As the fire within is burning intensely, perhaps the Vadas are not getting fried". Keshavāshram Swami suddenly understood his folly and asked the cooks to prepare the porridge immediately and serve Swamiji. Once Swamiji was served with the porridge, the Vadas were frying crisp and hot.

This incident (miracle) has also resulted in the Ksheeranna Seva (a special Seva or service) at the Shri Guru Matha at Mallāpur. Ksheeranna means rice gruel (porridge) in Kannada.

=== Priest from Narsobawādi ===
Even after his death, the shrine of Swamiji was supposed to be powerful. People go with in deep agony and return with a sense of calmness.

In the village of Narsobawādi there lived a priest, who along with his son, were afflicted by a strange disease that could not be cured by any medication. One night, in a dream, a holy saint (known as Narasimha Saraswat Swami) appeared and asked the priest and his son to go to Mallāpur and pray with full devotion at the shrine of Swamiji. The grace of the guru was such that both father and son were cured of their illness.

=== Renovation of Samādhi ===
Under Swami Pandurangāshram (The Eighth Head of the community) the shrine (samādhi) of Swami Shankarāshram II was renovated. During the renovation work, the stone slab covering the samādhi was removed. Everyone was surprised to find leaves of Tulsi and Bael that were placed hundreds of years ago still fresh. The fragrance of tulsi spread all across the shrine when it was uncovered. The leaves had defied age and were preserved intact.

== Death ==
In 1785, Swamiji went to Gokarn to pray at the shrine of Ādi Parijñānāshram despite being in very poor health. On the way back to Chitrāpur, the residents of Mallāpur asked Swamiji to stay at the Guru Matha at Mallapur for a few days to bless the people. It was during this stay that Swamiji's health took a turn for the worse very rapidly.

Swami Shankarāshram II died on the Shudh Tritiya (Holy 3rd day) of the month of Maagha in 1785 with his shishya Keshavāshram by his side. His samādhi (Shrine) is located at Mallāpur.

== Avatar of Lord Dattātreya ==
There lived a very famous Avatar of Lord Dattātreya in Akkalkot in Maharashtra by the name Swāmi Samarth Maharāj. He died in 1878. A devotee of his by name Sahasrabudhe Maharāj got a vision in Pune in 1983. In that vision Swami Samarth Maharāj advised him to visit a sacred samādhi of a Datt avatar in Mallāpur. In the vision, Swami Samarth Maharāj showed him the shrine of the Datt Avatar at Mallāpur and told him that urgent repairs were due at the shrine. Sahasrabudhe Maharāj had not even heard of this place.

The vision was too strong and compelling to be ignored. So he figured out where this place was and when he reached Mallāpur, he found the samādhi just as it was shown in his vision. After offering his services to the shrine, Sahasrabudhe Maharaj became a devotee of Swamiji. This proved that Swami Shankarāshram was a true avatār of Lord Dattātreya.

Preceded by Swami Parijñānāshram II	Guru of Sāraswats; 1770 – 1785	Succeeded by Swami Keshavāshram
