= Chitrapur Guru Parampara =

The Chitrapur Guru Parampara (Devanagari चित्रापुर गुरु परंपरा,Gu.ru Pa.ram.pa.ra) or Guru Heritage of the Chitrāpur Sāraswat Brahmins is the lineage of spiritual teachers (gurus), also known as Mathadhipatis (Ma.thā.dhi.pa.ti) (head of the Chitrāpur Math, Chi.trā.pur Ma.th) who have led the community throughout its history.

These teachers are viewed as the torch-bearers of the rich culture and heritage that the community has passed down from generation to generation. Starting with Param Poojya Parijnanāshram I Swamiji in 1708, the Parampara (lineage) continues through to the present Mathādhipati of the Chitrāpur Math Param Poojya Sadyojāt Shankarāshram Swamiji. He is currently the 11th Mathādhipati of the Shri Chitrapur Math.

== The Parampara ==
This chart shows the lineage of Paramparas. It shows the reigning period of each Mathādhipati along with his place of birth as well as place where his shrine (samādhi) is located.

Mathādhipati	Reign	Birthplace	Samādhi
Param Poojya Parijñānāshram Swamiji I	(1708–1720)	Unknown	Gokarn
Param Poojya Shankarāshram Swamiji I	(1720–1757)	Haritē	Shirali
Param Poojya Parijñānāshram Swamiji II	(1757–1770)	Kollur	Shirali
Param Poojya Shankarāshram Swamiji II	(1770–1785)	Mallāpur	Mallāpur
Param Poojya Keshavāshram Swamiji	(1785–1823)	Kandlūr	Shirali
Param Poojya Vāmanāshram Swamiji	(1823–1839)	Mangalore	Mangalore
Param Poojya Krishnāshram Swamiji	(1839–1863)	Vithal	Shirali
Param Poojya Pandurangāshram Swamiji	(1863–1915)	Mangalore	Shirali
Param Poojya Anandāshram Swamiji	(1915–1966)	Shirali	Shirali
Param Poojya Parijñānāshram Swamiji III	(1966–1991)	Mumbai	Karla
Param Poojya Sadyojāt Shankarāshram Swamiji	(1997–Present)	Chennai	

== The Saraswat Brahmins ==
Saraswat (Sā.ra.swat) is the generic term for the Brahmins or learned people who inhabited the fertile basin between the ancient rivers of Saraswati and Drishadawati in Kashmir. But usually Saraswat refers to the Saraswat Brahmins who come under the Chitrāpur Matha at Shirāli and are hence called Chitrāpur Sāraswat Brahmins (Bhānaps or Smārtha Sāraswats). Due to drought and famine, they migrated southwards towards Goa and Maharashtra. But Portuguese invasion of Goa forced the Sāraswats established near the Gomantak region to migrate further south towards Karnataka and settle down in the Kanara regions of Karnataka. Their administrative experience helped them attain several important posts in the regions in which they migrated to.

The Bhanap people are a small community and unconsolidated community. It is generally agreed that connection to the Guru Parampara and the Chitrapur Math are what defines them.

== The origin of the Guruparampara ==
During the reign of the Hindu chiefs of Nagar or Keldi (1560–1768) in the Kanara regions of Karnataka, the Smartha Saraswats held a variety of administrative and accountancy positions in the government. Since they were established in villages of the region, they adopted the names of the villages as their surnames.

However, the Saraswats experienced conflicts with the local people of the region, who went to the King of Nagar and argued that the Saraswats did not have a Guru and hence did not have a spiritual existence of their own.

As a result, the King issued an official decree whereby "If the Saraswats did not show him their Guru, a heavy penalty would be imposed upon them". The representative of the Saraswat community responded to the king that this was not possible, as the Guru of the Shenvis had left for Benaras. However, the King was not satisfied with this answer.

The Saraswat Brahmins were aghast. All the elders of the community held a dharan (community prayer) at the Temple of Lord Mahābaleshwar (Bhavānishankar) at Gokarna. The intensity of prayer is as quoted:

The Saraswats gathered together,
And prayed in all humility,
Giving up hunger, thirst and sleep...

Such was the intensity

The devotees with prayers in their hearts,
Unceasingly for long nights and days,
Surrendered unto Lord Mahabaleshwar,
At Gokarn, that sacred place.

Lord Bhavānishankar is said to have answered their prayers. In a dream he appears and assures his devotees that the next day, a Sanyasi would arrive at the banks of the Kotiteerth and he would guide the community as their Guru.

As the dream had proclaimed, a sanyasi clad in saffron robes and carrying the vigraha (idol) of Lord Bhavānishankara in his cloth pouch arrived at the banks of the Kotiteerth (Ko.ti.tī.rth), the village tank.

"Sacred ash smeared on the forehead,
The Guru arrived, the Benevolent One,
Clad in flaming saffron robes,
Resplendent like the Sun!

A 'Danda' adorned in one hand,
A 'Kamandalu' in another,
The brilliance of Shankara on his face,
The gentle smile of a mother!

A 'rudraksha mala' adorned his nech,
A 'Jholi' by His side,
Carried the 'Vigraha' of Lord Bhavanishankara,
Our Gurudev had come down to guide."

This sanyasi was Parijñānāshram I, the first Guru, who established in 1708, the Guru parampara in which the present guru Sadyojāt Shankarāshram is the eleventh in succession

== Sāraswats under the Swamis ==
For over 300 years, the Sāraswats have lived under the Guru Parampara, with each swamiji contributing to the development of the community in their own way.

=== Under Parijñānāshram I (1708–1720) ===
The Saraswat installed Swami Parijñānāshram I at the Sri Vishveshwar Vithal Temple and brought him to Nāgar and before the king. But the king refused to accept him as their guru unless the Shankarāchārya of the Sringeri Sharada Peetham gave his consent.

Parijñānāshram Swamiji travelled from Gokarna to Shringeri. At first he was denied entry into the temple by the priests there. In the night "Jagadguru" had a dream where he saw that the idol of Sharada Devi had lost its lustre as she was upset that her son was denied entry into the temple. In the morning the Jagadguru realised this when he saw the idol and immediately called for Parijnanashram Swamiji and gave his consent to the new Swamiji. The King then welcomed the new Mathādhipati of the Sāraswats. Thus, the Guru parampara was established.

The Swamiji consented to stay on at the Sri Vishweshwar Vithal Temple on the banks of the Kotiteerth in Gokarna which became the first Math or monastery (The Adi Matha) of the Sāraswats. He led the community till 1720 when Shankārashram I Swami became the Mathādhipati (head of the matha: generic name for head of the community). He attained Mahāsamādhi (death) on the Krishna Chaturdashi day of the month of Chaitra in 1720. His samādhi is located at the Adi Matha, Gokarna

=== Under Shankarāshram I (1720–1757) ===
Swami Shankarāshram was the mathādhipati from 1720 until his Mahāsamadhi in 1757. Under his leadership, the Chitrāpur Math at Shirāli became the head math (monastery) of the Sāraswats. His divinity has many popular folklores attached to it. Many devotees in grief and sorrow attained happiness due to his divine grace (see Swamiji's Miracles). Swamiji suddenly suffered from an untimely illness and succumbed to it and attained Mahāsamādhi in 1757. His samādhi is located at Shirali. He had not adopted a shishya (disciple) to continue the lineage or parampara.

=== Under Parijnānāshram II (1757–1770) ===
With Shankarāshram I Swamiji attaining samādhi without ordaining a new successor, the community was again put into a state of peril. The King had again seized the assets of the math with the condition that a new mathadhipati had to be installed.

The elders of the community gathered together and sought to resolve the impending peril. They went to a saintly person, who practised yoga, from the Pandit family in Kollur and asked him if he would take up the reins of the Mathādhipati. He accepted and thus was ordained as Parijñānāshram II Swamiji.

Not being the type who liked to wield power, Swamiji accepted a shisya (disciple) very soon and spent most of his time practising yoga at Kollur. He attained Mahāsamādhi in 1770 leaving behind his successor Shankarāshram II. His samādhi is located at Shirali

=== Under Shankarāshram II (1770–1785) ===
Swami Shakarāshram II was considered to be the avatār (incarnation) of Lord Dattātreya. He was a Jñāni (knowledgeable one) and people from all parts of the country flocked to hear his spiritual discourses. Many miracles have been attributed to him (see Miracles).

In 1781, swamiji accepted a shishya (disciple) and christened him Keshavāshram. In 1785 swamiji attained Mahāsamādhi and Swami Keshavāshram became the fifth mathādhipati of the Sāraswat Brahmins. The samādhi of Shankarāshram Swamiji is located at the small hamlet of Mallāpur in Karnataka at the Mallāpur Math.

=== Under Keshavāshram (1785–1823) ===
Keshavāshram Swamiji took charge of the math in 1785. As a learned person and scholar in Sanskrit scriptures, he believed that education was the key to success, and encouraged the Sāraswats to receive an English education during British rule. Since many other communities ostracized the English language, the Saraswats' English education allowed them to hold positions of high-esteem under the British.

Keshavāshram Swamiji is attributed with many miracles (see Miracles) and the popularity of the matha got a tremendous boost under his Ādhipatya (governance). He accepted a shishya in 1804 and ordained him Vāmanāshram. Thus another sacred link was added to the Guru parampara.

In the year 1823, Keshavāshram Swamiji attained Mahā-samadhi. His samādhi is located at Shirali

=== Under Vāmanāshram (1823–1839) ===
Vāmansāshram Swamiji became the mathadhipati in 1823. Vāmanāshram Swamiji had the distinction of serving as the shishya of Keshavāshram Swamiji for 19 years. He was a person who was more involved in spiritual pursuits than in administration. To reduce the burdens of administration, he accepted a shishya. This shishya was ordained as Krishnāshram in the year 1836.

After accepting a shishya Vamanāshram Swamiji gave up the administrative responsibilities and took the path of Tyāga (sacrifice) in 1836. Stories of his divine powers and intensity of prayer are legends among the Sāraswats. Swamiji attained Mahā-samādhi in 1839. His samādhi stands at Mangalore within the premises of the Mangalore Math.

=== Under Krishnāshram (1839–1863) ===
Param Poojya Krishnāshram Swamiji gained control over the matha in 1839. He was a dynamic and able administrator whose contributions to architecture and infrastructure still stand today. He ordered the construction of temples and mathas, set right existing ones and gradually converted many people from their Vaishnava practises.

Swamiji accepted a shishya in 1857 and ordained him as Pāndurangāshram. With the dynamism of youth in Pādurangāshram swami, Swami Krishnāshram could introduce many reforms for the benefit of the community.

Swami Krishnāshram attained Maha-samadhi in 1863. His samadhi (shrine) is located at Shirali.

=== Under Pāndurangāshram (1863–1915) ===
Param Poojya Pāndurangāshram took charge of the math in 1863. He is the longest serving Mathādhipati till date (52 years). He is considered one of the most brilliant of all the swamis and was distinguished by his mastery of Sanskrit and Logic. Even after taking charge of the matha, he continued to learn the Vedanta and the Upanishads. He stressed the need for education in the community, and under his guidance a school was established. He also brought about the development of general infrastructure of Shirāli.

Swamiji stressed Dharma (the right way to live) and encouraged a sense of patriotism in his country. He came under criticism for imposing a ban on foreign travel. Anyone who went abroad or anyone who associated with a person who went abroad were excommunicated. Overall, the period under the leadership of Swami Pāndurangāshram is called the "Glorious Age" of the Saraswats.

Miracles have been attributed to Swamiji. Swamiji was reluctant in adopting a shishya because he believed the community lacked discipline. Eventually when Swamiji was very sick, he relented to the pressure of the people and accepted a shishya. The new shishya, who was just 8 years old, was ordained as Ānandāshram. Thus, a sacred link in the Guru Parampara could be established. Pāndurangāshram Swamiji attained Mahā-samādhi in 1915. His samādhi is at Shirāli.

=== Under Ānandāshram (1915–1966) ===
Ānandāshram Swamiji served as mathādhipati for a period of 51 years. During these years, India went through turbulent times of the Independence struggle.

Under Ānandāshram Swamiji, the Sāraswat community developed at a rapid rate. The financial development of the community was given high priority, as the community was facing a financial crisis during the early parts of his reign. He also brought about many social reforms such as permission to go abroad and taking back the people from the community who had been ostracized for foreign visits.

Swami Anandashram accepted a shishya in 1959 and ordained him as Parijñānāshram. Swamiji attained Mahā-samādhi in 1966. His samadhi is in Shirali.

=== Under Parijñānāshram III (1966 - 1991) ===
Parijñānāshram Swamiji took charge of the matha after Swami Ānandāshram's reign. He had a progressive outlook and possessed knowledge of Vedic as well as technical matters. His dynamic approach to matters regarding the matha brought back the community's financial stability. His scientific temper resulted in the establishment of a printing press, Observatory and other technical advancements.

He was responsible for the starting of cottage and small-scale industries like printing press, handlooms and powerlooms, and agro-industries in the regions around the math. With the financial stability regained, the Rathōtsav (Car Festival) was restarted; which had been stopped under Swami Ānandāshram due to acute financial strain.

His farsightedness and ideas on development caused a rift with the "orthodox" members of the community. It also led to an open display of disrespect toward this Swamiji by certain lobbies. Swamiji made the ultimate Tyāga (sacrifice) by giving up the administration of the matha in 1981. This was reminiscent of Swami Vāmanāshram who had done the same in 1836. Swami Parijñānāshram III attained Mahā-samādhi in 1991. His samādhi is at Karla in Maharashtra.

After the Samadhi of Parampoojya Parijnanashram Swamiji, the Karla Math continued to be managed by the Chitrapur Saraswat Brahmin community, under guidance from His successor, HH Sadyojat Shankarashram Swamiji, the 11th Guru in the Chitrapur Saraswat Guruparampara and spiritual head of the institutions running the Karla Math.

=== Under Sadyojāt Shankarāshram (1997–present) ===
After a 6-year search for a guru, (1991–1997) the Sāraswat community found a Mathādhipati and Guru - HH Param Poojya Sadyojāt Shankarāshram Swamiji. In Him, the community found an erudite Vedic Scholar, an exponent of the advaitic Philosophy of Adi Shankaracharya, teacher, reformist leader, and much more. Ordained into Sanyas by HH Swami Ishwarānanda Giriji Maharaj as Sadyojāt Samvat Giri, He took up the reins of Shri Chitrapur Math in February 1997 as Sadyojat Shankarashram Swami at a well-attended, elaborate Ceremony blessed by HH Shankaracharya of Shringeri Shardamba Peetham.

Under Swami Sadyojāt Shankarāshram's guidance, the Shrivali Trust was established which has provided medical care and drinkable water to the people. Free value-based education is provided at the Shrivali School. Temples have been reconstructed from the state of ruin and general infrastructure has developed. The Shri Chitrapur Math Charitable Trust today works for the empowerment of the villagers providing livelihood to the underprivileged. Swamiji has stressed the development of the youth as a force and has resulted in the conducting of very many Shibhirs (youth camps) for the physical, mental and spiritual development of the youth in the community.

== Community ==
The Guru Parampara serves as a unifying institution for the Chitrapur Saraswat Brahmin community, whose members live in various parts of the world.
