= Chitrapur Math =

Community temple in Karnataka, India

Shri Chitrapur Math
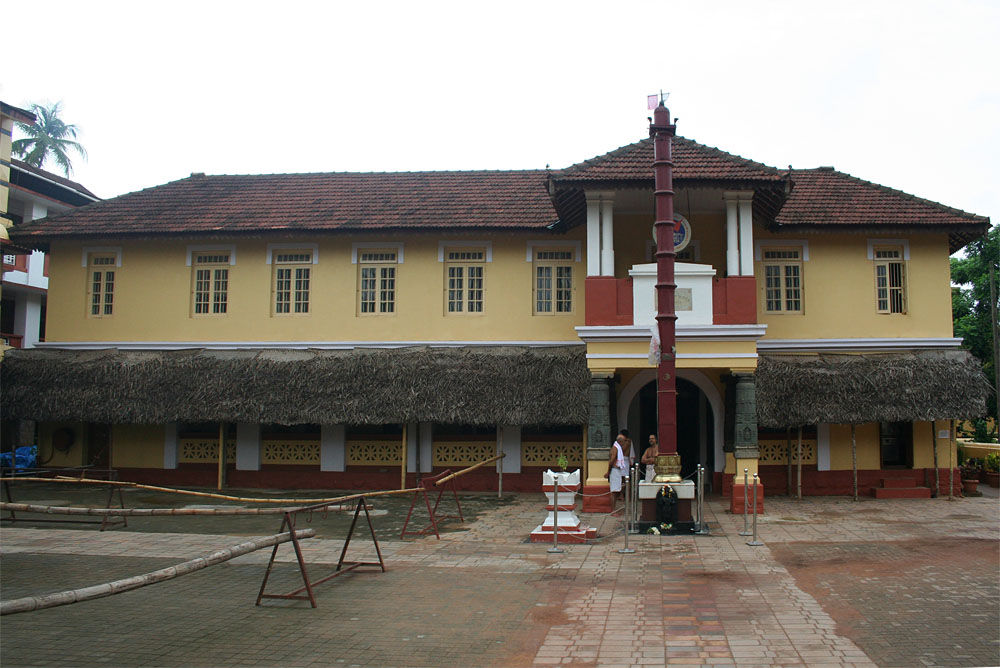
- The Chitrapur Math

- Location in Karnataka

Religion
- Affiliation: Hinduism
- District: Uttara Kannada

Location
- Location: Shirali
- State: Karnataka
- Country: India
- Interactive map of Shri Chitrapur Math
- Coordinates: 14.031071°N 74.534871°E

Shri Chitrapur Math is the central math (community temple) for the Chitrapur Saraswat Brahmin sect. It has been located at Shirali in the Bhatkal Taluk in the North Kanara district of Karnataka since 1757. The other maths of the community are located in Gokarna, Karla, Mangalore and Mallapur. All of the maths have the insignia of the saffron flag.

The presiding deity of the math is Shri Bhavanishankar, a form of Shiva. The remaining six sanctums house the Samadhis of the community’s previous Guru Swamis. Daily puja is carried out at the shrine of Bhavanishankar as well as the other Swamijis. This mutt has been the abode for Guru Parampara from the third Guru onwards.

As of 2023 Shri Sadyojat Shankarashram Swamiji is the head of the math, having ascended the Peetha in February 1997. Shree Sadyojat Shankarashram Swamiji is the eleventh of this lineage of Gurus which began in 1708.

Chitrapur Math Logo

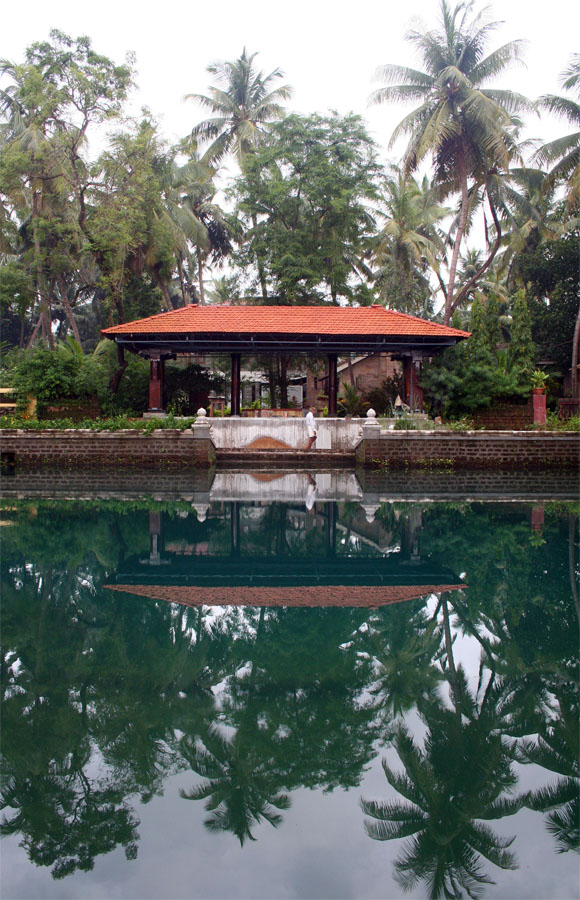
Sarovar

== History ==
=== Origins and Formation (1708) ===
The Shri Chitrapur Math was established in 1708 AD to address a socio-religious crisis within the Chitrapur Saraswat Brahmin community. Following their migration from Goa to the Kanara coast due to the establishment of the Goa Inquisition in 1560, the community lacked a formal spiritual head (Mathadhipati), which led to challenges regarding their communal status and religious legitimacy in the local courts of the Nayakas of Keladi.

In 1708, community elders at Gokarna sought the guidance of a Kashmiri Saraswat ascetic, who was initiated as the first Guru, Shrimat Parijnanashram Swamiji I. This event formalized the Guru parampara (lineage of teachers) that defines the Math's spiritual authority. Parijnanashram Swamiji I established the first Math in Gokarn.

=== Shift to Shirali (1757) ===
While the first Swamiji resided primarily in Gokarna, the headquarters of the Math moved to Shirali during the tenure of the second Guru, Shrimat Shankarashram Swamiji I. The move was necessitated by the need for a central administrative seat amidst regional political shifts. Following the Mahasamadhi of Shrimat Shankarashram I in 1757, a permanent shrine was constructed in Shirali, which has since served as the Math's spiritual headquarters. The shrine is called the Hodi Samādhi ('Big Samādhi' in Konkani).

=== Patronage and the Keladi Kingdom ===
The Math received significant patronage from the Nayakas of Keladi. Rulers such as Somasekhara Nayaka II and Basappa Nayaka II issued royal decrees (Sanads) recognizing the Mathadhipatis as the supreme spiritual authorities for the Saraswat community. These decrees often included land grants in the Shirali region to ensure the Math's financial independence and support its social welfare activities.

=== Modern Administration ===
In the late 19th and early 20th centuries, the Math underwent administrative modernization under Shrimat Pandurangashram Swamiji, who rebuilt the temple complex. His successor, Shrimat Anandashram Swamiji, introduced the Vantiga system—a structured voluntary contribution from community members—to fund the Math's expanding educational and charitable initiatives. Swāmi Parijnānāshram III set up a museum, almost single-handedly, of precious idols, artefacts, rare manuscripts and books.

== Lineage of Swamis ==
The lineage of all Swamis of this Math is called the Guru parampara.

1. Parijnanashram I Swamiji (1708–1720): Swami Parijnanashram I is believed to have been a direct avatar of Shiva himself and he came down from somewhere in the North (probably Varanasi). Not many details are known about this Swami, since record-keeping within the math started in about 1722.
2. Shankarashram I Swamiji (1720–1757): Swami Shankarashram hailed from the Harite family. He was consecrated by Shri Parijnanashram Swami in 1720 (Sharvari Chaitra Sh-15). He attained mahasamadhi in 1757 (Ananda, Phalgun Sh-5).At this point the issue of location of his Samadhi came up, and the Nagarkatti family offered their house in Chitrapur, Shirali for construction of the Samadhi and the Temple, which stands till today.
3. Parijnanashram-II Swamiji (1757–1770): Shri Shankarashram-I had not adopted any disciple which caused some concern as to the continuity of this lineage. The threat of property takeover by the regional authorities loomed large over the Math, and a member of the Pandit family was considered a worthy person for this position. He was ordained Shri Parijnanashram-II.
4. Shankarashram II Swamiji (1770–1785): He was adopted as a disciple from the priestly family of Shukla, assigned the name of Shri Shankarashram-II, and spent his life in Kollur in Dhyan (intense meditation), though he often visited Shirali. His Samadhi is located to the right of the Main Samadhi at Shri Chitrapur Math, Shirali. The samadhi of Swami Shankarashram-II is located in Mallapur, Uttara Kannada district.
5. Keshavashram Swamiji (1785–1823): The disciple chosen by Swami Shankarashram-II hailed from the Talgeri family and was given the name of Shri Keshavashram. He began acquiring land and other agricultural assets for the math.
6. Vamanashram Swamiji (1823–1839): He was ordained by Swami Keshavashram as a young disciple, once again from the Shukla family under the name Shri Vamanashram, who entrusted day-to-day matters of the math to the priests. He attained mahasamadhi in Mangalore.
7. Krishnashram Swamiji (1839–1863): A disciple adopted by Vamanashram Swamiji from the Nagarkar family was ordained for Sannyasa under the title of Shri Krishnashram. During the reign of Shri Krishnashram most of the disciples were brought round from Vaishnava practices, land was purchased and reforms introduced. The Rath Utsava (chariot festival) was started. He was a scholar in Sanskrit and the shastras. The disciple ordained by him was Shri Pandurangashram.
8. Pandurangashram Swamiji (1863–1915): Hailing from the Nagarkar family, he was the eighth sant, for over fifty years. He was ordained into Sanyasa at 12 years of age and was trained under the Guruswami for five years. The greater part of the math was rebuilt and all the Samadhis of his predecessors were reconstructed with silver under this tutelage. He built a school, a post office and other structures of necessity in the village. He was a scholar of Vedic astrology and the Vedas. He attained mahasamadhi in 1915.
9. Anandashram Swamiji (1915–1966): The peetha was then ascended by Shri Anandashram Swamiji, who hailed from the Haridas Family. He was ordained hardly 8 days prior to the mahasamadhi of Shri Pandurangashram Swamiji. Since his initiation in Sanyasa took place at a very early age, he was not able to be personally guided by the Guruswami. He improved the financial position of the math, which had dwindled during his early years, by making payments of vantiga (donations) almost mandatory. He reigned for 51 years and traveled widely. He attained mahasamadhi in Bangalore in 1966.
10. Swāmi Parijnānāshram III (1966–1991): A disciple was adopted by Sri Anandashram Swamiji in 1959, once again from the Shuklakar family. His name was Swāmi Parijnānāshram III. He restarted the Rathotsava since it had been discontinued by previous Swamis for financial reasons. He collected antiques and artifacts to set up a museum. He started a school for the disabled in Bolinj at Virar near Mumbai. He attained mahasamadhi in Bangalore in 1991. His Samadhi is located at Karla near Lonavla in Maharashtra. The samadhi enclave also contains a temple of Goddess Durgaparameshwari and Shree Ganesha just like the other Swamijis.
11. Sadyojat Shankarashram Swamiji (1997– ): The previous Swamiji had not adopted a disciple (shisya). But some members of the community found out that a Saraswat youth had taken Sannyas and was in Mount Abu. They requested him to ascend the Peetha; he agreed, and became the 11th Guru.

== Also Read ==
- Gaudapadacharya
- Govinda Bhagavatpada
- Adi Shankaracharya
- Shri Gaudapadacharya Math
