= Shankarashram =

Shankarashram is the name of two gurus of the Chitrapur Saraswat Brahmins community:

- Shankarashram I, the second head of the community who reigned from 1720 to 1757
- Shankarashram II, the fourth head of the community who reigned from 1770 to 1785
