= Pandurangashram =

Community Leader

Swami Pāndurangāshram

Personal life
- Born: Kālappa Nāgar; 1847 (6th day of the month of Jyēshta) Mangalore(?), Karnataka
- Died: 14 June 1915 (2nd day of the month of Jyēshta) Shirali, Karnataka
- Honors: EIGHTH guru of the Sāraswats; Large scale infrastructural development

Religious life
- Religion: Hinduism
- Philosophy: Shaivism; Dharma as the way to live

Religious career
- Teacher: Swami Krishnāshram, Swami Raghunāth Shāstri

Swami Pāndurangāshram (Devanagari: पाण्डुरङगाश्रम्, Pan.du.ran.gā.śram) was the eighth guru of the Chitrapur Saraswat Brahmin community (head of the community) for 52 years, from 1863 to 1915 (the longest on record as of 2012). He had succeeded his teacher Swami Krishnāshram after the latter died in 1857.

Pāndurangāshram was a Sanskrit scholar, a Yogi and was a Jyothishi (astrologer) as well. He believed in the Dharma (the correct way to live one's life) and was trained in the Sanskrit Scriptures under 'Swami Raghunāth Shāstri and 8 other special scholars from Kashmir.

Under his administration, several infrastructural changes were brought about in Chitrapur Village in Shirali and it was made as a "model village" with aspects of town-planning. Moreover all the samādhis (shrines) of the previous Mathādhipatis (or gurus) were reconstructed.

He brought about many social changes in the community. He was a firm believer in Dharma and reprimanded those who did not follow it. He imposed a ban on foreign visits and excommunicated anyone who went abroad.

Pāndurangāshram died in 1915 and was succeeded by his shishya (disciple) Ānandāshram. His samādhi (shrine) is located within the premises of the Chitrapur Math in Shirali.

== Taking Charge ==
Pāndurangāshram was born to Nāgar Shāntapayya and his wife on the 6th day of the month of Jyēshta in 1847. He was named Nāgar Kālappa. As a child he enlisted among the students of the Chitrapur Math. He was a bright, intelligent and handsome young boy. He became a favourite of the incumbent head of the community, Swami Krishnāshram.

He was ordained as the shishya (disciple) of the incumbent Mathādhipati (head of the community) Swami Krishnāshram at the age of 10 in 1857. For 5 years he received guidance under the tutelage of his guru. He was formally crowned the Mathādhipati after Krishnāshram died on the 8th day of the month of Mārghshīrsha in 1863 (See Months of the Hindu Calendar).

He mooted the idea of organizing the Rathōtsav (See Rathōtsav) and was involved with the execution of the first Rathōtsav.

...the young Shishya, Pandurangashram Swami used to play games in which items such as a Palki and a Chariot featured. The Chariot game blossomed into a Car Festival in the four years following the Shishya Sweekar. Two separate appeals helped this development. First, during the tours of North and South Kanara which the Guru Swami undertook with His young Shishya, the local Grihasthas at various places suggested that a Car Festival be held at Shri Chitrapur Math as was done at several other religious centres. Second, about three years after the ordination, Pandurangashram Swami was very keen on attending the Car Festival in nearby Bhatkal but was dissuaded by His Guru as it was not befitting Their Order. However, the Guru was so impressed by the Shishya’s fervent desire to see the Car Festival that He promised to hold such a function at Chitrapur. Accordingly, arrangements were made for constructing a Rath (car). Carpenters and artisans were invited from Goa to execute the work and the car was built in due course. H.H. Shrimat Krishnashram Swami inaugurated the Car Festival at Shri Chitrapur Math, Shirali, on 14 April 1862 (Saka 1784, Dundubhi Samvatsara, Chaitra Sh 15). The festival was established according to Agamokta Vidhi followed by the ancient temples in South India.

== Infrastructure development ==
Pāndurangāshram collected vanitga (donations) from devotees and used it for developmental activities of the matha and the community in general. After becoming the Head of the community, he made a four-step plan of development.

- Reconstruction/Renovation of Samādhis
- Planned construction of Chitrāpur Village
- Development of the Chitrapur Math
- Renovation of Temples and mathas (monasteries)

=== Reconstruction/renovation of Samādhis ===
Renovation of the samādhis (shrines) of the previous Swamijis of the Guru Parampara was an important part of Pāndurangāshram's agenda of development. All the samādhis had so far been built with thatched roofs. Under the renovation drive, the thatched roofs were replaced by proper tiled roofs. The samadhi of each guru was reconstructed such that the guru was made seated in the Lotus position (Padmāsana or Tāmarashāsan).

=== Chitrapur village development ===
Swamiji had wanted Chitrapur village to be a model village. Its infrastructure was improved.

- A road was constructed from the main road up to the entrance of the Chitrapur Math which had street lights on either sides.
- Houses were built in files on the side of the roads. Gardens were made on either side of the central road. The roads were swept clean every day.
- Schools were constructed for the children.
  A Post Office was built with all facilities including staying quarters for the Post Master.
  Separate market was constructed with stalls for selling commodities. This allowed people to go only to one place to do their shopping.

=== Chitrapur Math development ===
The stable financial state allowed several changes to be brought about in and around the Chitrapur Math.

- A tank (Shiv-Ganga Sarōvar) was dug near the math premises.
- A bhojan shālā(Kitchen and eating place) was constructed.
- New living quarters were built at the premises where devotees who visited could stay for free.
- At the Govardhan Hill nearby, a building by name "Panchavati" was constructed.

=== Renovation of temples and Mathas ===
The mathas (monasteries) at Mallāpur, Gokarn and Mangalore were in a bad state. Under Pāndurangāshram's supervision, mathas were renovated. The temples that were in a dilapidated condition, were renovated. Temple renovation was done by the people in the respective villages (in a decentralized manner) where the temple existed. Trusts were established where people contributed to and this money was used by the trust to renovate that particular temple.

== Social reforms and controversy ==
=== Dharma: The way of life ===
Pāndurangāshram wanted all his devotees to strictly adhere to curtailing one's senses and not falling to temptations. He would reprimand those who would disobey to follow the Dharma.

=== Ban on foreign visits ===
The most important reform of his that caused a lot of tension within the community was a ban on foreign visits. The community members had migrated to greener pastures in Bombay and Madras during British rule that helped them gain important posts. This meant that people had to go abroad on duties. Pāndurangāshram excommunicated anyone who travelled abroad.

Pāndurangāshram believed that foreign visits would expose a man to temptations of other cultures which would blatantly oppose Dharma. A person's life would be filled with gross materialism and a new culture of forgetting ones roots and even neglecting aged parents, would creep into society. A person would readily forget his spiritualism for the sake of financial benefits.

Pāndurangāshram readily excommunicated anyone who went abroad. If anyone associated with a person excommunicated, then that person too would be excommunicated. This was much criticised.

== Miracles ==
=== The sick boy from Mangalore ===
There once lived a poor devotee in Mangalore whose son was dying from an illness that seemed to have no cure. Abject poverty prevented the boy from gaining access to top quality medical care. Usually when Pāndurangāshram visited a place, devotees would light up the streets with diyas and flowers. But this family could not afford this.

When Pāndurangāshram visited their household, he gave them sandalwood paste (Gāndh) which was smeared on the head of the boy. He also gave the dying child teerth (holy or blessed water) which he drank. It is said that the boy recovered immediately.

=== Legal cases ===
Swami Pāndurangāshram is said to have acted as the agency of Lord Bhavānishankara in helping devotees entangled in unfair legal cases to be freed from conviction by his sincere prayers. The most notable was the forgery case of Kallē Manjunāthaiya.

==== Forgery case of Kallē Manjunāthaya and Rām Rao ====
In the town on Bantwāl, there lived a document writer by the name of Kallē Manjunāthaiya who worked under the then Sub-Registrar Rām Rao. One day a Brahmin came to him to create a document regarding property. Manjunāthaiya created the document and got it registered by Rām Rao. But without the knowledge of Manjunāthaiya a forged document was placed at his table which was then registered. A case of forgery was later discovered. The two of them were called to the Sessions Court at Mangalore facing trail for forgery of important property documents. They were helpless as all the evidence pointed against them.

Rām Rao pleaded to Pāndurangāshram, who happened to be in Mangalore at that time, to pray for justice. Pāndurangāshram went to the samādhi (shrine) of Swami Vāmanāshram at the Mangalore matha (monastery) and prayed for justice to Lord Bhavānishankara.

This case had created quite a stir in Karnataka and soon the trial was nearing an end with the sessions court judge having the opinion that the accused were guilty. It was days before judgement that the Judge was suddenly transferred. His successor heard the entire case and then pronounced Kallē Manjunathaiya and Rām Rao innocent.

== Shishya Sweekar ==
As time passed by, the devotees got anxious about the continuation of the Guru Parampara and asked Pāndurangāshram to accept a shishya (disciple) who would succeed him as the Head of the community, but he did not. Pāndurangāshram was greatly perturbed by the disobedience of community members under his reign: The people who firmly abided by the Dharma and maintained the tradition of the ancestors, were few in number. The large number of excommunications that Pāndurangāshram carried out also played its part in his silence. The devotees had pleaded him to accept a disciple Eight times and each time he had remained silent. He would always pray to Lord Bhavānishankar (the community deity) to give him strength to hold firm in his decision.

But the Lord had ordained otherwise. In the month of Vaiśākha (around June) in 1915, Swamiji made a decision to accept a shishya. The son of a priest named Haridās Rāmchandra Bhat was the one anointed. His name was Shantamoorthy. He was ordained as Ānandāshram during the Shishya Sweekār ceremony (a ceremony where the guru accepts his disciple).

== Death ==
Eight days after the Shishya Sweekār of Ānandāshram, Swami Pāndurangāshram's health deteriorated and he died, on the second day of the month of Jyeshtha). He was 68.

His of 52 years was the longest ever on record. His samādhi (shrine) is located inside the Chitrapur Math premises and to the left to the samādhi of Swami Shankarāshram I.

| Preceded by Swami Krishnāshram | Guru of Sāraswats; 1863 – 1915 | Succeeded by Swami Ānandāshram |
