= Keshavashram =

Swami Keshavāshram

Personal life
- Born: Talgēri (family name) Kandlur(?), Karnataka
- Died: 1823 (9th day of the Mārghashīsha month) Shirali, Karnataka
- Honors: FIFTH Guru of Chitrapur Saraswat Brahmins

Religious life
- Religion: Hinduism
- Philosophy: Shaivism, Dharma

Religious career
- Teacher: Swami Sharkarāshram II

Swami Keshavashram (Devanagari: केशवाश्रम्, Ke.sha.vā.shram) was the fifth guru of the Chitrapur Saraswat Brahmin community, that is, the Fifth Mathādhipati (head of the Chitrāpur Matha) of the community. His reign was from 1785 to 1823, a period of 38 years (42 years including his period as disciple of Swami Shankarāshram II). He became the head of the community after his teacher (guru) Swami Shankarāshram died in 1785.

Under his administration, the Chitrapur Math acquired land and property. He was able to consolidate the Sāraswat Community both in numbers (increased the number of followers) and in faith (weaned away many from Dvaita Vaishnava practises). He died in 1823 at Shirali. His samādhi (shrine) is located at Shirali.

(Note: In this article Swamiji will refer only to Swami Keshavāshram)

== Taking charge ==
Swami Keshavāshram became the Fifth head of the community after his teacher (guru) Swami Shankarāshram II attained Mahā-samādhi in 1785 in the month of Maagha. The official taking over took place on the tenth day of the month. Swamiji had the advantage of being under his guru for 4 years and could hence could easily take charge of the administration of the Chitrāpur Matha and the community in general.

Swamiji was a very able administrator and he could acquire land and fixed property for the Chitrāpur Matha. This resulted in the expansion of the matha. He would personally supervise the administration and finance of the matha whenever he had the spare time. He was well versed with the scriptures but at the same time had a keen mathematical prowess. In the 42 years in charge with the matha administration (38 years as the Mathādhipati and 4 as disciple to his guru), he could consolidate the community as a whole.

He was considered as a good orator. The knowledge and the speaking skills were very convincing and devotees flocked to hear his discourses.

"Poojya Swamiji, truly a Jnāni
With Spiritual Knowledge did glow,
Discourses filled with wisdom,
So smoothly would flow!
Devotees flocked to listen to the words of wisdom,
Our beloved Sadguru they came to meet,
In abundance they received from Gurudev,
With reverence they prostrated at His Lotus Feet."

Swamiji could convince many devotees from getting rid of their Dvaita Vaishnava practices. Thus many devotees were united under the Guru Parampara and bore allegiance to the Chitrāpur Matha. The devotees never failed to pay a portion of their income to Swamiji and thus the financial stability, that the matha had lacked for so long, was achieved.

== Importance to education ==
During Swamiji's reign, the British got hold of the Canara Districts (Upper and Lower) (See: British control) where the community was primarily located. Knowing that changing times demanded changes in society, Swamiji encouraged English education. Thus the Sāraswats could occupy prestigious administrative posts during the British Raj.

== Miracles ==
Swami Keshavāshram is attributed to many miracles. Devotees in distress and in need had their problems redressed due to his divine powers. Two of them are listed below.

=== The Mute boy from Murdeshwar ===
There lived a pious devotee in the town of Murdershwar who had a son who was mute. This devotee and his wife tried all sorts of therapy and medication to get the boy to speak, but all that failed. When all hopes seemed to dim, his wife and neighbours asked him to take his son to seek Swamiji's blessings. But this devotee was so pious and considerate that he refused stating that he did not want his burdens to be transferred to Swamiji in any way.

One day both he and his wife had a dream where Swamiji had blessed their son and he was normal again. Since both of them had the same dream, they thought the message was too strong to ignore. So with hopes filled in their hearts, they went to Shirali to meet Swamiji. The entire family prayed in utmost humility to Swamiji. The boy was weeping bitterly but silently beside Swamiji. When Swamiji placed his hand on the boy's head, the boy miraculously got back his power of speech. The family was then blessed by Swamiji and they returned to Murdeshwar.

=== The Cripple from Mangalore ===
In the town of Mangalore lived a devotee of Swamiji whom was physically challenged (feet had a disability). He lived on the charity of people but was truly devout. He had an ardent desire to seek blessings of Swamiji. Despite not having any money or food with him, he started his journey to the Chitrapur Math on barefoot. Even though his clothes were tattered and poor, his heart was hopeful as he continued.

En route his feet got swollen and his knees became very tired. With all his energy sapped and the destination still far away, the poor man rested under a Banyan tree very dejected and doubtful of completing his journey. At night he had a dream where Swamiji came to him under the Banyan tree and was massaging his tired feet with oil. At dawn when he woke up, all the pain and agony had disappeared and he could walk normally. With his health and spirits re-energized, the devotee made his way to Swamiji at Shirali and fell at his feet with true devotion. The Swamiji blessed him and the devotee returned with content and happiness.

== Shishya Sweekār ==
When Swamiji's health started becoming frail and weak, the devotees requested Swamiji to accept a shishya (disciple). Swamiji graciously accepted the offer. So the search was on to find a suitable successor.

The suitable successor was found in a youngster from the Shukla Bhat family from Shirali. On the Shuddha Panchami (5th day) of the Ashādhā month in 1804, the new shishya was ordained as Vāmanāshram. He would be under the tutelage of Swami Keshavāshram for another 19 years. This long period of being under a guru helped Vāmanāshram attain high proficiency in the Sanskrit scriptures.

== Death ==
After being the head of the community for 38 long years, Swami Keshavāshram died on the Shīrsha Navami (9th day) of the Mārgha month in 1823. He died with his shishya by his side. His samādhi (shrine) is located at Shirali.

Preceded by Swami Shankarāshram II	Guru of Sāraswats; 1785 – 1823	Succeeded by Swami Vāmanāshram
