= Parijnanashram II =

Parijñānāshram II

Personal life
- Born: Pandit Kollur, Karnataka
- Died: 1770(Ekadashi day of the Bhadrapad month) Shirali, Karnataka
- Honors: Third Mathādhipati of Chitrāpur Sāraswats

Religious life
- Religion: Hinduism
- Philosophy: Shaivism

Religious career
- Teacher: Swami Shankarāshram I

Swami Parijnanashram II (Devanāgarī: परिज्ञानाश्रम, Pa.ri.jñā.nā.shram) was the third Guru and Mathādhipati of the Chitrāpur Sāraswats whose reign was between 1757 and 1770. He was ordained as the guru by the elders of the community after Swami Shankarāshram I died without selecting a shishya (disciple). Normally it is the shishya who ordained by the guru, who succeeds as the guru of the community.

Swami Parijnānāshram II was an ascetic by nature and did not like to wield power. He lived most of his life practising yoga at Kollur and only occasionally visited the Chitrāpur Matha, the head matha of the community. He left his shishya, Shankarashram discharge most of the administrative duties.

== Period of turmoil ==
The period between the death of Swami Shankarāshram and the ordainment of Swami Parijñānāshram II was a period of turmoil for the Sāraswat Community.

=== The demolition and retribution ===
When Swami Shankarāshram died suddenly without accepting a disciple or shishya, the community was left without a head. The situation was similar to that faced before the Guru Parampara was initiated. The King of Nagar seized the assets of the matha. The community was again issued a decree that unless they showed the King their Mathādhipati (Head Guru of the matha), they would have to face heavy penalties.

The King ordered his men to demolish the samādhi (shrine) of Swami Shankararāshram (See Samādhi of Swami Shankarāshram). The shrine had a Shiva Linga made of clay, which the King's men came to destroy. No matter how many torrents of water were poured on it or how many blows of the sledge-hammer fell upon it, the Shiva-linga did not suffer a single dent. The Guru's grace prevented such destruction. Eventually the men gave up trying to destroy the shrine and went back.

Within a matter of a few days, all the men who tried destroying the shrine ended up dying.

"Some of them threw up blood,
Some died a violent death,
Violence when men give
Violence is what they get

The Sadguru is gentle and loving,
But, when man willfully does attack,
The answer is swift retribution,
Pat! It comes back!"

=== Parijnanashram II ===
The elders of the community met to find out who the next Mathādhipati should be. It was during this meeting that they remembered a person from the Pandit family who dwelt at the small hamlet of Kollur and had been blessed by Swami Shankarāshram. He was a hermit who used to practise Yoga at Kollur. The devotees went and met this noble person and pleaded with him to be the guru of the Sāraswats. The sanyasi agreed to their pleas. Thus on the banks of the Tāribagil River, the devotees ordained him as Swami Parijnānāshram (Known as Swami Parijnānāshram II since the first guru of the community was Swami Parijñānāshram)

Once the news of the arrival of the new guru reached the ears of the King of Nagar, he took back the order and restored the Chitrāpur Matha back to the community. Thus the Sāraswats had got back their head matha and also had a guru to lead them.

== Shishya Sweekar ==
Swami Parijñānāshram II was reclusive by nature. So, once the period of turmoil for the community was over, he decided to accept a shishya (disciple) and then continue his life of an ascetic. He ordained a shishya from the Shukla Bhat family in Mallāpur village in Karnataka. He was ordained as Shankarāshram (Śan.ka.rā.shram). He is formally known as Swami Shankarāshram II as the second mathādhipati (Chief of the matha at Chitrapur) was Swami Shankarāshram.

After accepting a disciple, Swamiji continued with his ascetic life. He was mostly at Kollur and would visit the Chitrapur Matha frequently to check on his shishya as well as the administration.

== Ailing woman of Kumta ==
Swami Parijnānāshram II is known to have performed miracles for his devotees in their times of need. The best known is that of the ailing woman from the village of Kumta. She was the wife of a businessman. He tried the best of medications but she would not get better and would always end up worse.

This businessman was asked by his friend to seek the blessings of Swami Parijnānāshram at Shirali. The businessman from Kumta prayed with sincerity to Lord Bhavānishankara (presiding deity of the community) and with full devotion fell at the feet of swamiji. Swami Parijnānāshram offered him Phalmantrāksat – Phal.man.trā.kshat (rice smeared with vermilion or kumkum) as prasad ("holy offering").

The businessman offered this to his wife and upon placing it on her head, suddenly she recovered. She said that she had a dream of a sanyasi who assured her that everything will be all right and that she will be fine soon. When the couple went to seek blessings from Swami Parijnānāshram the woman was astonished to see that the sanyāsi who came to her in her dreams was none other than poojya swamiji himself. They prostrated in joy at His feet and sought his blessings.

== Mending of relations with Bhatkals ==
Under Swami Shankarāshram I the community had fallen out with the people from Bhatkal (See Fall-out with the Bhatkals). So Swami Parijnānāshram mended the strained relations with that clan.

This happened as a result of a Domino effect which was started by a wealthy businessman from Bhatkal. Initially he had no faith in the Guru Parampara. A friend of his persuaded him to go along with him to meet swamiji at Shirali. With a lot of persuasion, he agreed to go along. But the mere presence and touch of swamiji is said to have brought about a total transformation in him. He fell at Swamiji's feet and begged for apology on his behalf and also on those in his clan who were non-believers. This Sāraswat businessman spread the word about the divine grace of the Guru Parampara and thus the stand-off of sorts with the clan of Bhatkals was resolved.

Thus under Swami Parijñānāshram II Swamiji there was a "Spiritual Tide" that swept across the community and uniting it under one roof of the Chitrapur Math.

== Death ==
Parijñānāshram II Swamiji died on the Ekadashi day(11th day of the month according to the lunar calendar) in the month of Bhādrapad in 1770 at Shirali. His last word to his shishya, Shankarāshram were:(as roughly translated from Konkani to English)

"You have to now lead the community. Counsel them like how a mother would guide her child. Guide the people in this spiritual journey to lead a spiritual and chaste life. Remember, the soul is eternal and imperishable even though functions of the body do cease...."

The shrine (samādhi) of Swami Parijñānāshram II Swamiji is found at the Chitrapur Math at Shirali, to the left of the samādhi of his guru, Swami Shankarāshram I.

Preceded by Swami Shankarāshram I	Guru of Sāraswats; 1757–1770	Succeeded by Swami Shankarāshram II
