= Shripad Subrao Talmaki =

Rao Bahadur Shripad Subrao Talmaki
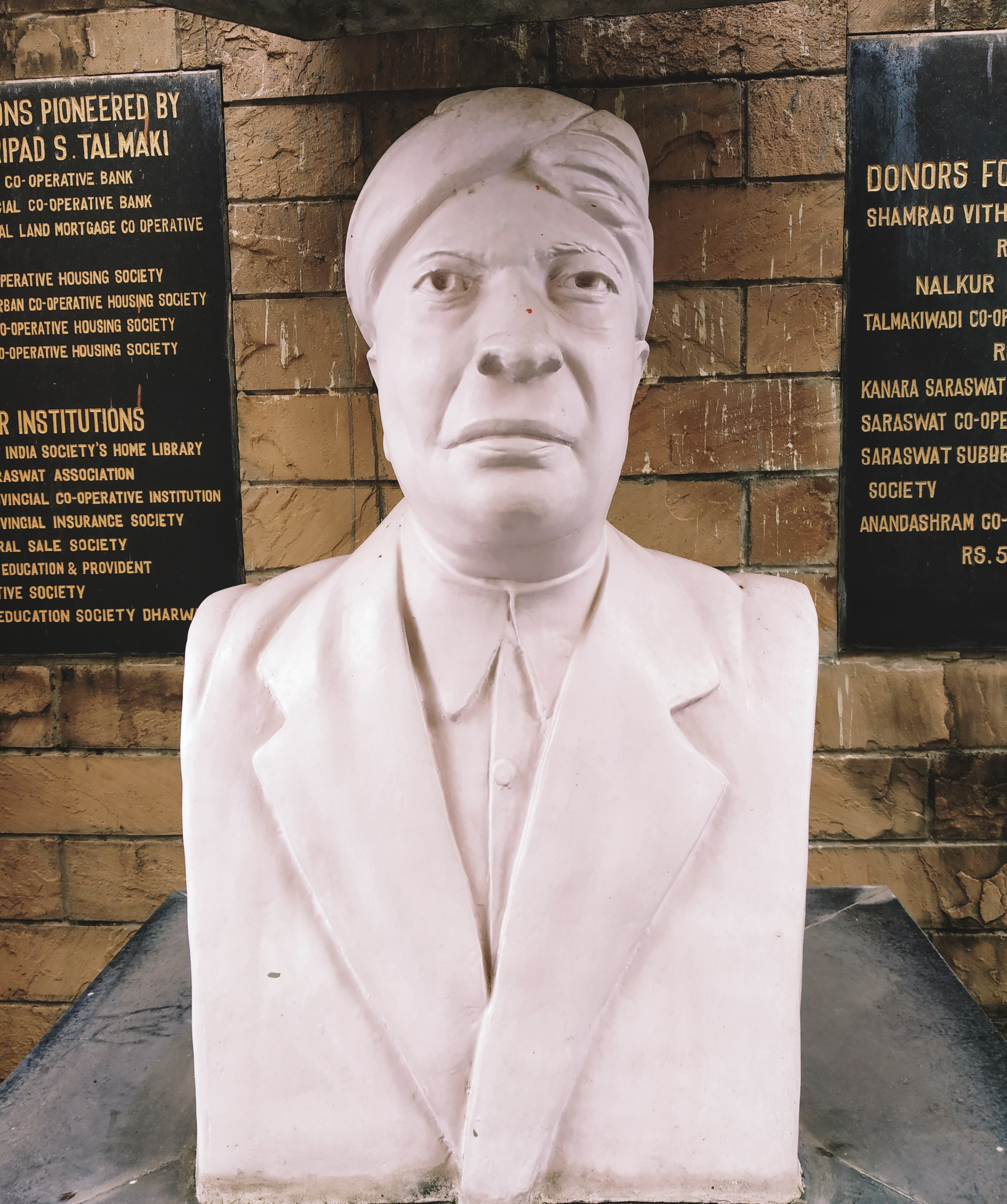
- Statue of Shripad Subrao Talmaki in Talmakiwadi, Mumbai
- Born: 25 December 1868; Manki, Honnavar, Madras Presidency
- Died: 28 January 1948 (aged 79); Dharwad, Karnataka
- Education: Wilson College, Mumbai
- Occupations: Social Reformer

Rao Bahadur Shripad Subrao Talmaki (25 December 1868 - 28 January 1948) was a social reformer and early pioneer of the Cooperative movement in India and is known as the father of India's cooperative movement. He was a member of the Chitrapur Saraswat community.

== Architect of Cooperative Movement ==
=== Cooperative banking ===
He was the main architect for the founding of The Shamrao Vithal Co-operative Bank Ltd (now known as SVC Cooperative Bank Limited), which was registered on 27 December 1906, and he named it after Late Shamrao Vithal Kaikini, who was his main guiding force and Guru. It was set up with the primary objective of assisting the less fortunate members of the community in its economic enterprises, to encourage savings and to create funds for providing financial aid to deserving members.

=== Cooperative housing ===
On 28 March 1915, he co-founded the Saraswat Cooperative Housing Society in Gamdevi, Bombay (Mumbai), Asia's first Cooperative Housing Society. This was followed up by cooperative housing societies for the Chitrapur Saraswat community in Santacruz and Tardeo Road, also in Bombay.

== Historian and Genealogist ==
Beyond his work in the cooperative movement, Talmaki was a dedicated researcher of his heritage. He conducted an exhaustive socio-cultural study of the Chitrapur Saraswats, documenting their history and lineages. He identified and recorded 504 distinct families within the community. His research was published in the seminal three-part book Saraswat Families, which remains the primary reference for Chitrapur Saraswat genealogy today.

In addition to his own community, he was sought after by others and was instrumental in the creation of the 'Hindu Co-operative Housing Society', 'Provincial Co-operative Institute, Bombay', a scheme of co-operative housing for the industrial workers of Bombay and a Housing Society for the Mahar community of Bandra.

== Literary Works ==
- Saraswat Families (3 volumes)
- Co-operation in India and Abroad
- Konkani proverbs and riddles, lullabies, and nursery songs
