= Shamrao Vithal Co-operative Bank =

Indian cooperative bank

SVC Cooperative Bank Limited
- Company type: Co-operative Bank
- Industry: Banking; Financial services
- Founded: 1906
- Founder: Late Shamrao Vithal Kaikini (1842-1905); Late Rao Bahadur Shripad Subbarao Talmaki (1868-1948)
- Headquarters: Mumbai, India
- Key people: Durgesh S Chandavarkar (Chairman); Ravinder Singh (Managing Director)
- Products: Commercial banking Retail banking Private banking Trade Finance; Asset management Mortgages; Foreign Exchange
- Revenue: Rs 33,480.61 crore
- Net income: Rs 176.31 crore
- Number of employees: 2302 (2023)
- Website: www.svcbank.com

The Shamrao Vithal Co-op. Bank Ltd. (SVC Bank) known as SVC Cooperative Bank Limited, is a scheduled bank in India that was established in 1906, being registered as a Co-operative Credit Society on 27 December 1906. Its main goals when it was established were to encourage saving, help the less fortunate people of the community with their economic endeavours, and to raise money to help deserving members.

== History ==
Late Rao Bahadur Shripad Subbarao Talmaki, the Maharshi of Co-operation, was the main architect of the Bank and he named it after Late Shamrao Vithal Kaikini, who was his main guiding force and Guru. The Bank was originally registered as a Co-operative Credit Society on 27 December 1906.

== Branches ==
The bank has 198 branches and is present in 11 States of India: Maharashtra, Karnataka, Tamil Nadu, Telangana, Delhi, Rajasthan, Haryana, Goa, Gujarat and Madhya Pradesh.

== See also ==
- Banking in India
