= Maha Ganapathi Mahammaya Temple =

Hindu Temple

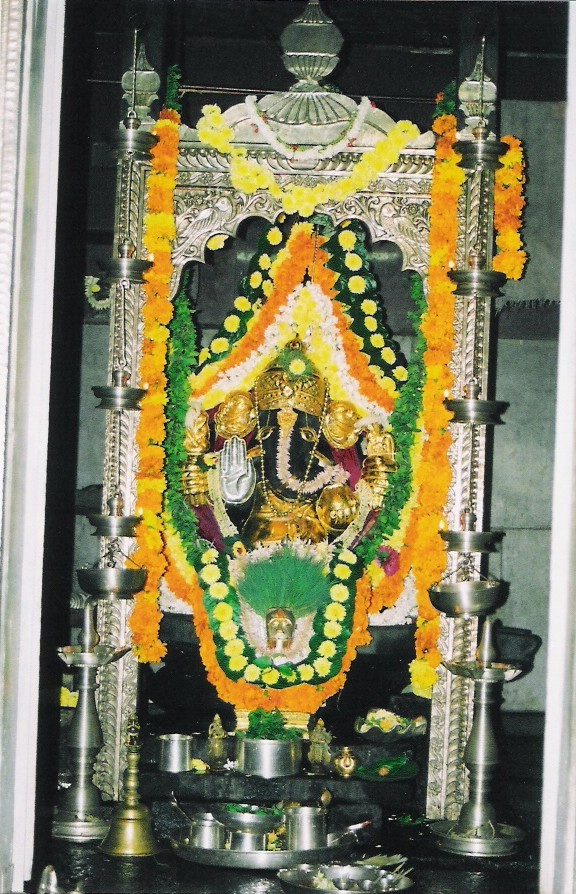

- Location in Karnataka

Religion
- Affiliation: Hinduism
- District: Uttara Kannada

Location
- Location: Shirali
- State: Karnataka
- Country: India
- Interactive map of Maha Ganapathi Mahammaya Temple
- Coordinates: 14.0317°N 74.5233°E

The Maha Ganapathi Mahammaya Temple is a Hindu temple in Shirali in the Uttar Kannada district of Karnataka state. The temple is dedicated to the god Ganesha as Mahaganapati (Maha Ganapathi) and the goddess Mahamaya (Shantadurga). The temple is the Kuladevata Temple (family temple) of the Goud Saraswat Brahmin community. The temple god is a Kuladevata (family deity) of the Kamaths, Bhats, Puraniks, Prabhus, Joishys, Mallyas, Kudvas and Nayak families from the Goud Saraswat Brahmin community. The Temple was built about 400 years ago. It was renovated in 1904.

== History ==
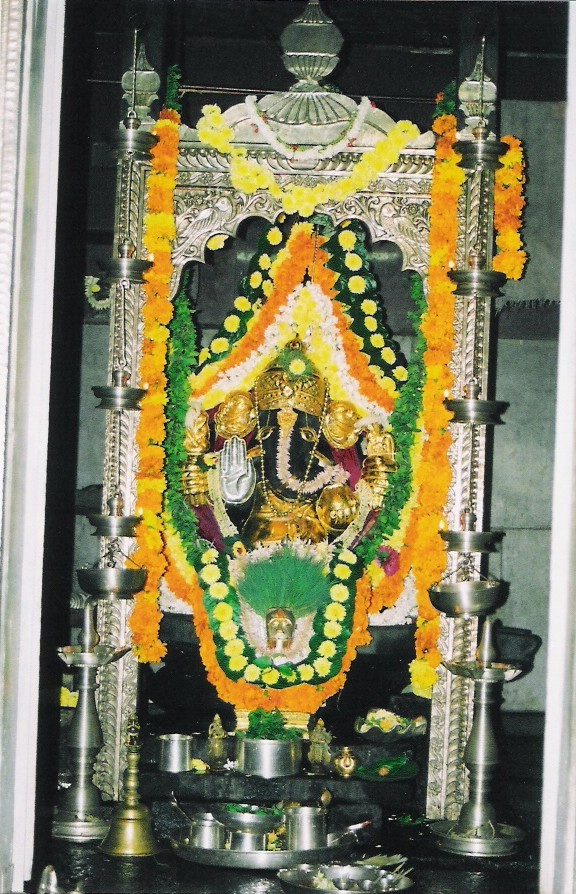
Maha Ganapathy at Shirali

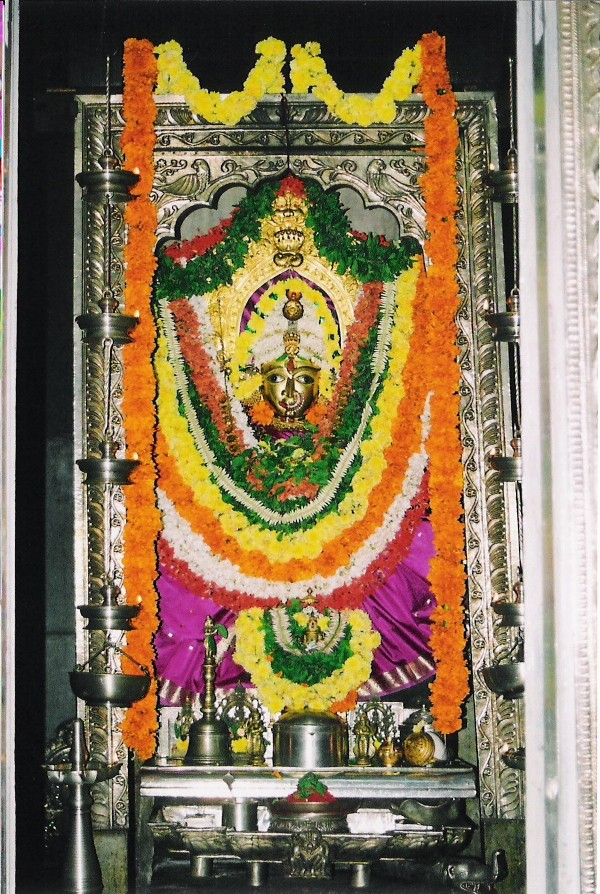
Mahammaya at Shirali

The idol of Mahaganapati (Ganesha, Vinayaka) and Mahamaya (also referred as Durgadevi and Shantadurga) were located in Ella, Tiswadi, Goa along with Gomanteshwar and its affiliates. During the Muslim invasion in Goa (13th century), the temple in Ella was destroyed and the idols were transferred to Goltim-Navelim (Golthi-Naveli) on Divar Island. Gomanteshwar and his affiliated deities still remain in Ella in Brahmapur. On account of the hostile religious policies pursued by the Portuguese rulers around 1560, the devotees left Goltim-Navelim after the destruction of the temple there. Unable to take the idols with them, they invoked the ‘saanidhya’ or the presence of the deities in the silver trunk of the elephant-headed Ganesha and the mask of Mahamaya. When they reached Bhatkal, they were unable to construct a temple immediately and kept the two symbols in a shop belonging to a devotee. Later on they constructed a temple in Shirali, a few miles north of Bhatkal, where it stands to this day. The deities are also called Pete Vinayaka and Shantadurga as they are located in a "pete", which means a town in Kannada. The temple has a unique darshan seva called, "mali".

Some other devotees also transferred the idols of Mahaganapati and Mahamaya from Goltim-Navelim to Khandepar and from there to Khandola.

== Rituals ==
Today, the temple at Shirali conducts various pujas including Shasraganayaga, Rathotsav, Ganahoma and Sahasrachandikahavana. The Rathotsav or the Car Festival is celebrated by the temple on Margashira Shudda Navami (in November or December.) The important events during rathotsava include pete utsava of Mahaganapathi on Margashira Shudda Chauthi and Mahamaya on Margashira Shudda Ashtami, ratri utsava every night and okuli on Margashira Shudda Dashami.

== Following ==
It is estimated that currently the Shirali Maha Ganapathi and Mahammaya temple has 125 Kulavis (family with specific kula devata), with a total of 6000 persons. Most Kulavis visit the temple annually, and many Kulavis living abroad visit the temple every time they visit India. The temple management has built spacious rooms to accommodate Kulavis who visit the temple and also provide food to the Kulavis during their stay at the temple.
