= Bhiksha =

Sanskrit term for the act of seeking alms

Bhiksha (Sanskrit: भिक्षा, bhikṣā; Pali: 𑀪𑀺𑀓𑁆𑀔𑀸, bhikkhā) is a term used in Indic religions, such as Jainism, Buddhism and Hinduism, to refer to the act of alms or asking. Commonly, it is also used to refer to food obtained by asking for alms.

== Buddhism ==
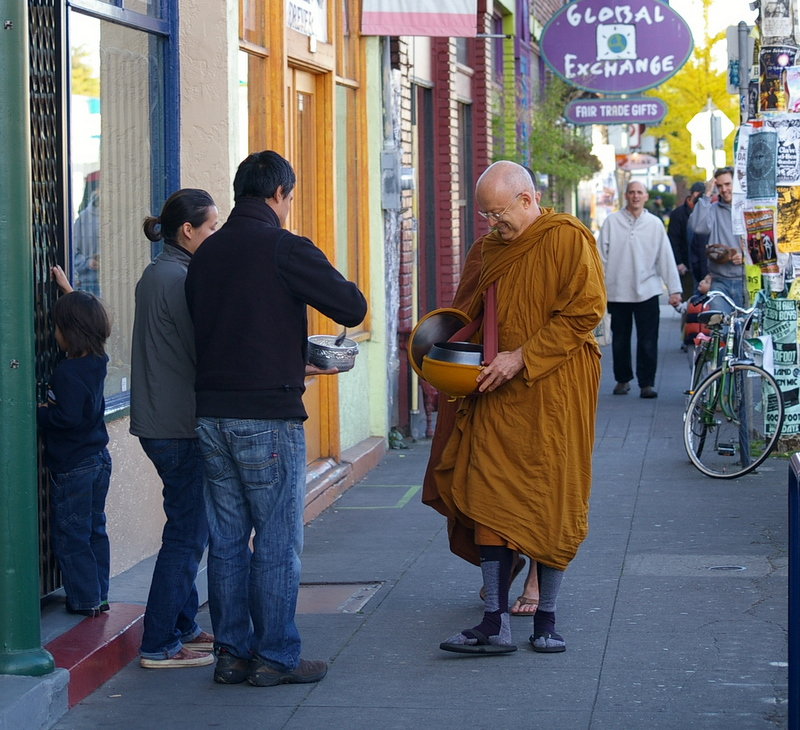
Ṭhānissaro on piṇḍacāra receiving piṇḍapāta

In Buddhism, bhiksha takes the form of the monastic almsround (Pali: 𑀧𑀺𑀡𑁆𑀟𑀘𑀸𑀭, piṇḍacāra), during which monks make themselves available to the laity to receive alms food (Pali: 𑀧𑀺𑀡𑁆𑀟𑀧𑀸𑀢, piṇḍapāta).

Buddhist monks are called bhikkhu (Pali) or bhikṣu (Sanskrit) while nuns are called bhikkhunī (Pali) or bhikṣunī (Sanskrit) which translates to 'almsman' and 'almswoman' respectively.

== Hinduism ==
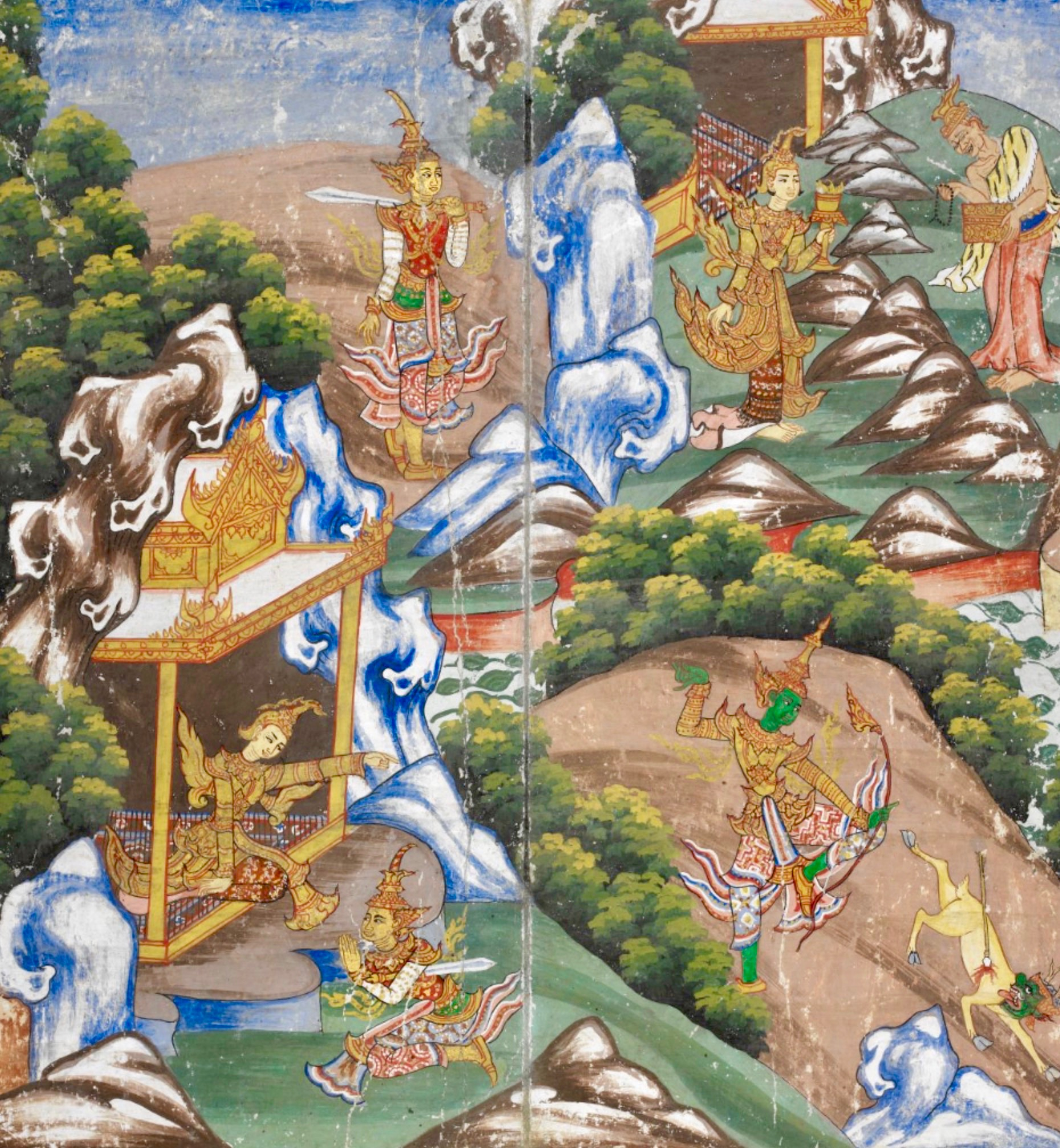
19th-century Ramayana manuscript of Ravana begging from Sita in the Ramayana.

Bhiksha signifies a Hindu tradition of asking for alms with the purpose of self-effacement or ego-conquering. Other forms of giving and asking include dakshina (offering a gift to the guru) and dāna (an unreciprocated gift to someone in need).

Usually, bhiksha is the meal served to a sadhu sanyasi or monk when that person visits a devout Hindu household. Occasionally, bhiksha has also referred to donations of gold, cattle, and even land, given to Brahmanas in exchange for karmakanda. It is given by disciples to a guru as an offering as well.

Bhiksha is incorporated into religious rituals as well, a prominent one being the bhikshacharanam, which includes begging for alms. In such a ritual, after thread ceremony must beg for alms, stating, "bhavati bhiksham dehi".

There are several instances of someone seeking bhiksha in Hindu literature. One noteworthy instance is found in the Ramayana. In this epic, in order to lure Sita out of her hermitage, Ravana disguises himself as a Parivrajaka begging for alms. When she subsequently offers him bhiksha, he abducts her to Lanka upon his pushpaka vimana. The abduction sets the stage for the rising action.

== See also ==
- Dakshina
- Dāna
