= Shankarashram I =

Shankarāshram I

Personal life
- Born: ShuklaBhat Harite(?), Karnataka
- Died: 1757(6th day of Ashwina month) Shirali, Karnataka
- Honors: Second Mathādhipati of Chitrāpur Sāraswats; Founded Chitrāpur Matha at Shirāli

Religious life
- Religion: Hinduism
- Philosophy: Shaivism

Religious career
- Teacher: Swami Parijñānāshram I

Swami Shankarashram I (Devanāgarī: शङकर्ाश्रम् or शंंकर्ाश्रम्,Śa.m.ka.rā.śram) was the second guru and Mathādhipati (Head of the community or Head of the matha ("Monastery")) of the Chitrāpur Sāraswats. He was ordained as the Mathādhipati in 1720 and served as the head till his death in 1757. He was the shishya (disciple) of Swami Parijñānāshram I.

Swami Shankarashram was responsible for the establishment of the Chitrapur Math at Shirali which is now the head matha of the Sāraswats. Under his reign, the matha got many land grants from the King of Nagar. There are many stories where Swami Shankarāshram is said to have performed miracles (See Miracles) for his devotees in their times of need. So devotees from different parts of Karnataka and beyond came to be his followers.

He died in 1757 at Shirali. His samādhi (shrine) is located inside the Chitrapur Math at Shirāli. He was succeeded by Swami Parijnanashram II as the Mathādhipati in the same year.

== Pattābhisheka (Crowning Ceremony) ==
Shankarāshram was the son of Krishnayya Kulkarni of the Shukla Bhat family before he was chosen as the shishya of Swami Parijñānāshram, the first Mathādhipati and guru of the Sāraswats. He belonged to the Kaundinya Gotra

Shankarāshram I was ordained as the second Guru of the Sāraswats after the Mahā-samadhi of his guru, Swami Parijñānāshram (On Krishna Chaturdashi day of the month of Chaitra in 1720). The ceremony was held at the Bhandikere Matha in Gokarn(See Ādi matha). He had been under Swami Parijñānāshram for only 14 days after which Swami Parijñānāshram diĄed.

At the time of Swami Shankarāshram ordination as the new Mathādhipati, his devotees gave a solemn promise in writing, that they would be faithful to him and would always follow his religious observances. The Swami's family henceforth was known as Shuklabhat (Shu.kla.bha.t).Shukla means "bright" or "new" in Sanskrit and Bhat is a generic surname for scholars. So Shuklabhat means "New scholars". (NOTE:Henceforth in this article, Swamiji will refer to Swami Shankarāshram I

== Expansion of Matha ==
During the reign of Swami Shankarāshram, the community and the matha received land grants from the King of Nagar. In 1739, Bāsappa Nayak II of Nagar made land grants to the Math by a gift deed. This helped in the development of the infrastructure of the matha.

Swami Shankarāshram was able to persuade several people from stopping their Vaishnavite customs and converted them to the Advaita Shaivism practised by the community.

== Miracles ==
Swamiji is attributed to many miracles which he is said to have performed for his highly devout followers when they were faced with difficulties. Two of them are listed below.

=== Brahmin from Bankikodla ===
Once there lived a Brahmin in the village of Bankikodla who was pious and devout. Every morning after finishing his pooja (prayers and offerings to the Lord), he would stand on the streets and try to find a hungry beggar. He would offer that needy person his hospitality and serve that person good meal. He did this out of true concern for the people in need in his village.

He had this desire of serving Swamiji but could not travel all the way to Gokarn to meet him. One day he happened to see a sanyāsi clad in saffron robes walking down his street. When the sanyāsi came closer, the Brahmin discovered that it was none other than Swami Shankarāshram. With great reverence he led Swamiji to his house and fed him a simple meal that his wife had prepared.

After the meal, when Swamiji was resting, the Brahmin left his house for an errand. When he came back he saw that the swami had left. He was utterly disappointed that he could not see the swami off. Some time later he called on the matha only to find that the swami had never left the matha at all that morning. So when the Brahmin next met Swami Shankarāshram, with teary eyes he fell at Swamiji's feet and thanked him for having fulfilled his ultimate desire.

=== Artist from Gokarn ===
Once there was an artist who lived in the town of Gokarn. He was a pious Brahmin who found it difficult to make ends meet since his paintings were not selling. He had an ardent desire to serve Swamiji at his home, but he could not afford it.

One night, both he and his wife had a dream where Swamiji assured them his grace. They were startled since both of them had had the same dream. So the next day they prepared a simple meal with much love and devotion anticipating the arrival of Swamiji. As the dream had proclaimed, Swamiji came to their home. He graciously accepted their bhikshā (meal) and a meagre amount of four Annāskānika (monetary offering). He blessed the couple and left for the matha.

Within a few days after Swamiji's visit, the artist received a huge assignment from a wealthy family for a portrait. The patron was very pleased by the work and rewarded the artist handsomely with a princely sum of Rupees One Thousand. The artist recognized this as the result of the blessings from Swamiji. He immediately rushed to Swamiji and placed the entire amount at his feet. Swamiji accepted a small portion of the money and gave back the rest and asked him to pursue his work with full devotion. The swamiji promised him that the grace of the Lord was always with him.

Things were never the same for the artist. His services were hired by many a patron who rewarded him generously for his works. This story is a popular tale among the people of the Sāraswat community.

== Fall-out with residents of Bhatkal ==
Even though the devotion of many people grew, not everybody "believed" in the divine grace of Swami Shankarāshram. The residents of the town of Bhatkal were among those who chose not to have faith in the Swamiji.

Once Swamiji travelled to Bhatkal to offer spiritual discourses to the residents there. It so happened that rumours about the Swamiji being a fake spread rapidly. So on the given day nobody was there to welcome him and perform Gurusēvā (Service to the Guru). This misunderstanding resulted in the Bhatkal clan being distanced from the Swamiji's followers.

== Chitrapur Math ==
After the "no-show" at Bhatkal (See above section) Swami Shankarāshram was deeply hurt. He decided to return to Gokarn. On the way back, at the village of Shirali, the devotees pleaded to Swamiji to stay there for sometime and to bless the people with his presence. The swamiji consented and he stayed at the residence of the Nāgarkattē family.

The Nāgarkattē family later donated their residence in honour of the Swamiji, after his death. This became the Chitrāpur Matha, the head matha of the community.

== Death ==
During his stay at Shirāli as the honoured guest of the Nāgarkattē family, Swami Shakarāshram's health failed rapidly. To the dismay of his devotees, his health took a turn for the worse and Swamiji became terminally ill.

"My children, the grace of Lord Bhavānishankara will always protect you. Follow all that has been taught without fear"
(-Translated from Konkani to Sanskrit).

With these words, Swami Shankarāshram died on the 6th day of the month of Ashwina in 1757. Swamiji's untimely death meant that he could not accept a shishya(disciple). This resulted in the community not having a guru to succeed Swami Shankarāshram. His samadhi is located in Shirali and is also called the Hodi Samādhi ('Big Samādhi' in Konkani)

Preceded by Swami Parijñānāshram I	Guru of Sāraswats; 1720 – 1757	Succeeded by Swami Parijñānāshram II
