= Vamanashram =

19th-century Hindu religious leader

Swami Vāmanāshram Swamiji

Personal life
- Born: Upesh Babu (Family name) Kochi, Kerala
- Honors: Eeighth guru of the VAISHYA SAMAJ community

Religious life
- Religion: Hinduism

Religious career
- Teacher: Bharathi Tirtha

Swami Vāmanāshram (Devanagari: वामनाश्रम्, Vā.ma.nā.śram), also called Swamiji, was the sixth guru of the Chitrapur Saraswat Brahmin community (6th in the Guru Parampara). He reigned for 16 years from 1823 to 1839.

He was considered a Bramha-jñāni (All knowing one).

== Life ==
Swami Vāmanāshram was from the Shukla Bhat family from Mangalore. He was ordained as the successor to Swami Keshavāshram in 1804 and was under the tutelage of his guru Swami Keshavāshram for a period of 19 years. During this time he gained mastery over the Vedas, Upanishads and other Sanskrit scriptures.

Swamiji was formally ordained as the Guru of the community after Swami Keshavāshram died on the 9th day of Mārgha month in 1823.

=== Shishya Sweekar ===
Upon the insistence of his devotees to accept a disciple to help him with the affairs of the community, Swamiji consented in accepting a shishya (disciple). His successor, Parameshwar Nagar, was found in the hamlet of Vitthal in Karnataka when Swamiji visited. The priest of the Shri Vishweshwar Vitthal temple had told Swamiji about Nagar, telling him the young boy radiated with energy and potential.

In the month of Jyēshta in 1836, Swamiji formally ordained his shishya as Krishnāshram.

=== Tyāga: The Sacrifice ===
Swamiji was a man who was deeply involved in spiritual pursuits, but the administration of the matha and its treasury was materialistic pleasures that the Swamiji denounced. Since he could not concentrate on both the administration affairs of the matha and the affairs of the community in general, he gave total responsibility of the administration to his shishya and the Shukla Bhat managers.

=== Death ===
Swamiji went to visit his devotees in Mangalore in 1839. It was during this visit that he became seriously ill. His health was rapidly deteriorating.

Swami Vāmanāshram died on the 9th day of the month of Kārtik in 1839. He was succeeded by his shishya Krishnashram.

The devotees of Swamiji constructed his samādhi (shrine) in the matha at Mangalore. Devotees offer seva (service) as Shiyala Abhisheka. Tender coconut water is poured on the shrine as abhisheka.

Preceded by Swami Keshavāshram	Guru of Sāraswats; 1823 – 1839	Succeeded by Swami Krishnāshram
