= Karli, India =

Karli Karla
- town
- Location in Maharashtra, India Karli (India)
- Coordinates: 18.785173°N 73.470554°E
- Country: India
- State: Maharashtra
- District: Pune
- Demonym: Karlikar

Languages
  - Official: Marathi
- Time zone: UTC+5:30 (IST)
- Nearest city: Pune

Karli (also Karla) is a town on the highway between Pune and Mumbai in the Mawal taluka of the Pune district in the southern Maharashtra of India. It is on a major trade route that runs from the Arabian Sea eastward, into the Deccan. Karli's location in Maharashtra places it in a region that is the division between North India and South India. It encompasses an area of 457 ha (1,129 acres).

The small town is most famous for the Karla Caves—a 1st-century BC Buddhist temple complex or chaityas cut out of stone. At 40 m (130 ft) long and 15 m (49 ft) in height, it is the largest such chaitya in India. The aisle of the temple is flanked by 37 pillars that are topped with kneeling elephants.

The outside facade is in bad repair due to stone breakage as well as the erosion of intricate details carved to imitate finished wood. The central motif is a large horseshoe arch. There is a lion column in front, with a closed stone facade and almost ruined torana in between. On one side there is a temple of Shree Ekvira devi (Ekveera Aai).

Three years later hostilities were resumed. The Bombay government now sent an army to the Konkan, with orders to march across the Western Ghauts on Poonah. An advanced party of under Captain Stewart first took possession of the Bhore Ghaut, where they were joined by the main army under Colonel Charles Egerton. Hartley had been offered the post of quartermaster general to the army, but he preferred to take his place at the head of his battalion.

On 4 January 1779, during the First Anglo-Maratha War, forces of the Maratha Empire confronted at Karli a force of six companies of grenadier sepoys in the British service, which set out from Bombay with the intention of reaching Puna. In the skirmish, the British commander, Captain Stewart, was killed.

== Administration ==
The village is administrated by a sarpanch, an elected representative who leads a gram panchayat. At the time of the 2011 Census of India, the village was a self-contained gram panchayat, meaning that there were no other constituent villages governed by the body.

== Demographics ==
At the 2011 census, the village comprised 624 households. The population of 2748 was split between 1439 males and 1309 females.

== See also ==
- List of villages in Mawal taluka

== Bibliography ==
- Lonely Planet India. Tenth edition pg 771.
