= Parijnanashram I =

Swami Parijnanashram I
- Died: 1720 (day of Krishna Chaturdashi, month of Chaitra) Gokarn
- Honors: First Guru of the Chitrapur Saraswat Brahmins; Established Adi-matha at Gokarn

Religious life
- Religion: Hinduism
- Philosophy: Shaivism; Dharma as the path to Moksha

Religious career
- Teacher: Lord Bhavanishankar

Swami Parijnanashram I, or Adi Parijnanashram, (Devanāgarī: आदि परिज्ञानाश्रम, Ādi Pari.jñān.āśram) was the first guru and Mathadhipati, or head of a matha (community monastery), of the Chitrapur Saraswat Brahmins. He is said to have been ordained by Lord Bhavanishankar (Bha.vā.ni.śan.kar) in 1708 to guide the Chitrapur Saraswat community.

Swami Parijnanashram I was a Sanyasi who was a Kashmiri Sāraswat Brahmin. Lord Bhavanishankar asked him in a dream to go to the banks of a kotiteerth (water tank) in Gokarn to lead the Chitrapur Saraswat community, which was facing an official decree from the King of Nagar imposing penalties unless the Saraswats showed him their guru.

Swami Parijnanashram I was renowned as a man of great spiritual grace, and was a scholar in the Sanskrit scriptures and the Vedanta. He established the community's first matha, at Gokarn. He was succeeded by his shishya (śi.śya; disciple), Shankarashram (Śankar.āśram). Parijnanashram I died in 1720. His shrine is located at Bhandikere in Gokarn, beside the Uma Maheshwar temple.

== Before Parijnanashram I ==
After the Chitrapur Saraswat Brahmin migration from Goa, the Saraswats had taken up prestigious administrative posts in the kingdom of Nagar (part of present-day Kanara), being regarded as more intelligent and efficient than the other people of the region. This caused jealousy, and led to complaints to the king that the Saraswats had no guru, and hence no independent spiritual existence. In response, the king issued a decree stating that unless the community presented their guru heavy penalties would be imposed on them. This included evicting them from their administrative posts.

The community elders, in despair, prayed to Lord Mahabaleshwar (Ma.hā.ba.le.śwar) at Gokarn. They had a dream that a sanyasi would appear on the banks of the Kotiteerth, the temple tank, the following day.

== Swamiji Arrives ==
At the appointed day and hour, a saffron-robed sanyasi with ash smeared on his forehead appeared on the banks of the Kotiteerth. A Kashmiri Saraswat Brahmin, he carried an idol of Lord Bhavanishankar in his cloth pouch, and had come guided by Lord Bhavanishankar in a dream. The sight of this saint bearing the idol of their Kuladevata (Ku.la De.va.ta) (the tutelary deity of the community) was met with joy.

The sanyasi was formally ordained as Swami Parijnanashram at the Sri Vishveshvar Vitthal (Vi.śve.śvar Vi.t.h.al) Temple at Gokarn, in 1708. This marked the start of the guru lineage, or Guru Parampara, of the Chitrapur Saraswats. The people of the community wrote to the King of Nagar announcing their new guru.

The Chitrapur Saraswat community's Chikarmane (Chi.kar.ma.ne) clan built a monument, the Belli Mantap ("Belli Hall, or Temple"), at the place where the community met Swami Parijnanashram at the Kotiteerth in Gokarn.

== Shringeri ==
The King of Nagar, unconvinced, asked the Saraswats to have their guru, or Mathadhipati, approved by the Jagadguru Shankaracharya, the head of the Sringeri Sharada Peetham, which is the Shringeri matha. This caused consternation, as the Shankaracharya's followers had been hostile towards the Saraswat community.

Swami Parijnanashram received the order calmly, and travelled from Gokarn to Shringeri to meet with the Shankaracharya. When the people of Shringeri locked the doors of the temple of the goddess Sharadamba (Śa.ra.dām.ba) on his arrival, the swamiji stood at the doorstep and prayed. The intensity of these prayers is said to have sparked a vision by the Jagadguru Shankaracharya of the goddess Sharadamba's annoyance at the callousness of the temple officials. When the Shankaracharya went to the temple, he saw that the idol had lost its lustre.

The Shankaracharya called Swami Parijnanashram into the temple, where they talked. The Jagadguru Shankaracharya was impressed by Swami Parijnanashram's detailed knowledge of the scriptures, his mysticism, and his yogic abilities. He gave his consent by offering Swami Parijnanashram the symbols of a Mathādhipati: the Adda Palaki (A.dd.a Pā.la.ki; a palanquin), Birdu, and Bavāli. The Jagadguru Shankaracharya's letter of consent officially proclaimed Swami Parijnanashram the Guru of the Saraswats.

The king of Nagar was informed, and rushed to greet Swami Parijnanashram. He apologized profusely for having questioned his authority, by falling at his feet. Swami Parijnanashramji is said to have maintained the same calm when the community was in despair and when he was celebrated by the king with honours and festivities. After the king had accepted the Saraswat community's guru, the decree was repealed.

== Adi-matha ==
Once the crisis was resolved, Swamiji wanted to return to his sannyasa, or ascetic life. But his devotees wanted him to remain, and after much pleading he graciously consented. Swami Parijnanashramji took up residence at the Sri Vishveshvar Vitthal Temple at Gokarn, where he performed his Anushthān (ceremony of foundation). The temple became known as the Adi-matha, or first community monastery, of the Chitrapur Saraswat community.

== Shishya Sweekar ("Accepting a Disciple") ==
As the community wanted the Guru parampara to continue, the devotees asked the ageing Swami Parijnanashram to accept a shishya (śi.śya), or disciple, to succeed him as Mathādhipati. The guruji responded by accepting a shishya, so allaying the community's concerns.

That disciple was the son of Krishna Kulkarni of the Haritekār family. His shishya sweekar, or acceptance ceremony, was performed on the day of Shudha Poornima (Śu.dha Pūr.ni.ma) in the month of Chaitra, 1720. Swami Parijnanashram ordained his new shishya as Shankarashram (Śankar.āśram).

== Death ==
With the news of Swami Parijnanashram's failing health over time, devotees came from far afield for Darshan (to see the Swami), and to receive his blessings. The swamiji died in 1720, on the day of Krishna Chaturdashi in the month of Chaitra, just 14 days after accepting Shankarashram as his disciple.

Swami Parijnanashram's last words to his disciple Shankarāshram were (translated to English from Konkani): "Lead the devotees on the spiritual path and unto the Lord's grace. Lord Bhavānishankar will always protect you when you face obstacles". Param Poojya Swami Shankarashram I was then ordained as the next Mathādhipati.

Preceded by (none)	Guru Of Sāraswats; 1708–1720	Succeeded by Swami Shankarāshram I
