= Shirali =

- village
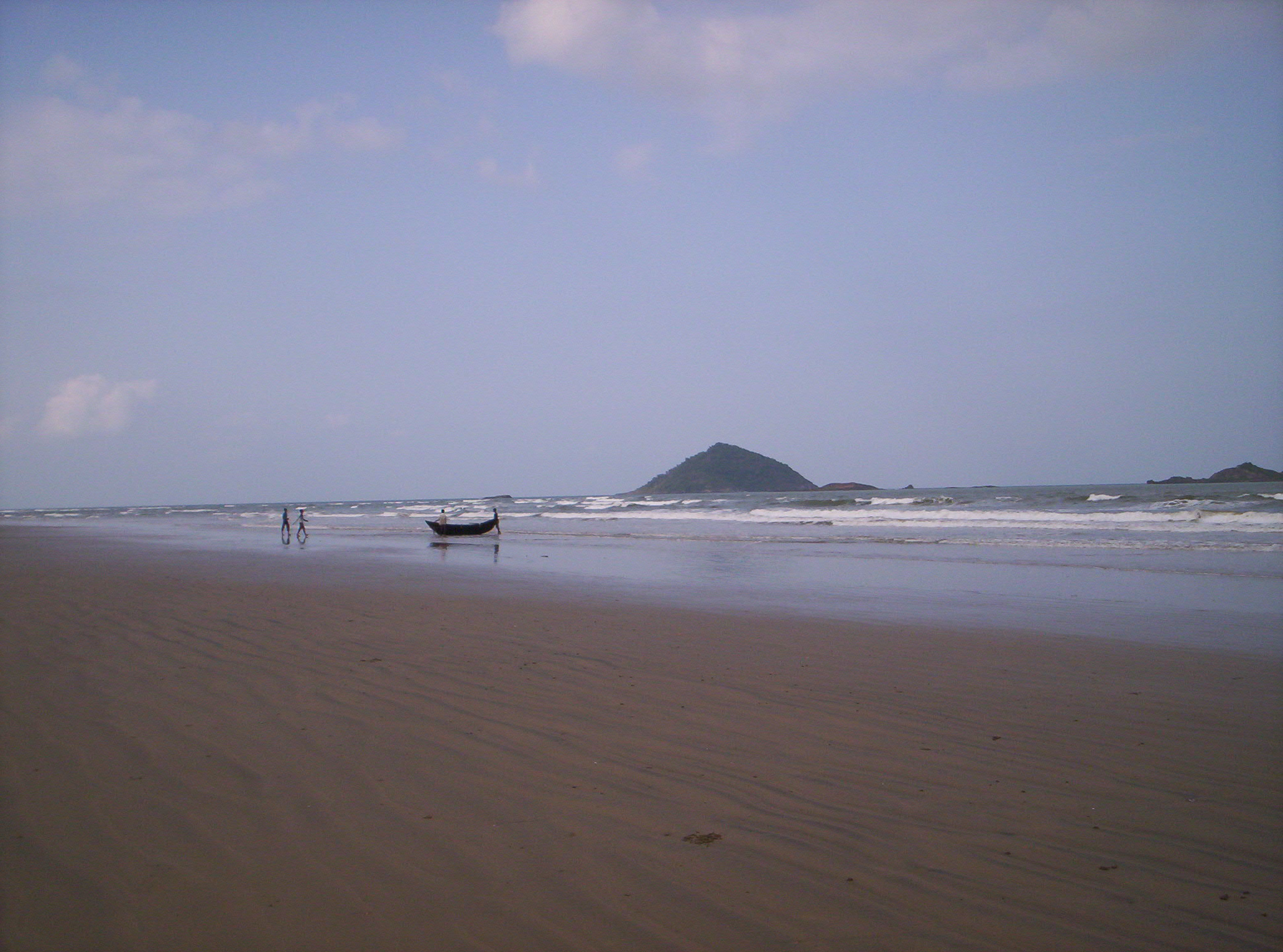
- Shirali Beach

- Location in Karnataka, India
- Coordinates: 14.0167°N 74.5167°E
- Country: India
- State: Karnataka
- District: Uttara Kannada

Area
  - Total: 13.16 km^{2} (5.08 sq mi)
- Elevation: 42 m (138 ft)

Population (2011)
  - Total: 23,000
  - Density: 1,700/km^{2} (4,500/sq mi)

Languages
  - Official: Kannada
  - regional: Konkani
- Time zone: UTC+5:30 (IST)
- PIN: 581 354
- Telephone code: 91-(0)8385
- Vehicle registration: KA-47

Shirali is a village in Bhatkal taluk of Uttara Kannada district in Karnataka. Shirali is home to two prominent temples: the Chitrapur Math and the Maha Ganapathi Mahammaya Temple. The Chitrapur Math is the holiest temple of the Chitrapur Saraswat Brahmin community, and the Maha Ganapathi Mahammaya temple is the Kuladev to the Kamaths, Bhats, Puraniks, Prabhus, Joishys, Mallyas, Kudvas and Nayak families from the Goud Saraswat Brahmin community.

== Etymology ==
The name Shirali is derived from Sanskrit Shrivalli, which means wealthy. The shrine of Shrivalli Bhuvaneshwari inside the premises of Chitrapur Math is the origin of the name Shirali.

== History ==
Shirali gained historical prominence following the mass migration of the Goud Saraswat Brahmin (GSB) and Chitrapur Saraswat Brahmin communities from Goa in the mid-16th century. This migration was a response to the hostile religious policies and the Goa Inquisition initiated by the Portuguese Empire around 1540–1560 AD.

The devotees initially moved to Bhatkal, but were unable to immediately establish a permanent temple. They carried the sacred symbols of their deities—a silver trunk representing Ganesha (Maha Ganapathi) and a mask representing Shantadurga (Mahamaya)—and kept them in a local shop (angadi) in the Shirali area, then known as "Shirali Pete".

=== Keladi Nayaka Period ===
Maha Ganapathi Mahammaya Temple: The current temple structure in Shirali was built approximately 400 years ago on land donated by the Shenoy and Mallya families. The temple was later renovated in 1904 in the traditional Gomantak architectural style.

Shri Chitrapur Math: The Chitrapur Math, the spiritual headquarters of the Chitrapur Saraswat Brahmins, was established in Shirali in 1757. It was built to consecrate the Samadhi (shrine) of the second Mathadhipati, Shrimad Shankarashram Swamiji I. It was built on land donated by the Nagarkattikar family, who had their house on this spot.

== Geography ==
Shirali is located at 14.0167°N 74.5167°E. It has an average elevation of 12 meters (42 ft). Nearest towns- On the South is Bhatkal and Baindur. On the North is another temple town, Murudeshwar .

== Climate ==
Climate data for Shirali (1991–2020, extremes 1974–2020)
Month	Jan	Feb	Mar	Apr	May	Jun	Jul	Aug	Sep	Oct	Nov	Dec	Year
Record high °C (°F)	36.9 (98.4)	38.6 (101.5)	37.6 (99.7)	38.3 (100.9)	38.2 (100.8)	37.1 (98.8)	33.9 (93.0)	32.6 (90.7)	34.3 (93.7)	36.2 (97.2)	36.9 (98.4)	37.1 (98.8)	38.3 (100.9)
Mean daily maximum °C (°F)	33.3 (91.9)	33.4 (92.1)	34.2 (93.6)	34.9 (94.8)	34.7 (94.5)	30.9 (87.6)	29.2 (84.6)	29.5 (85.1)	30.4 (86.7)	31.9 (89.4)	33.5 (92.3)	33.7 (92.7)	32.4 (90.3)
Mean daily minimum °C (°F)	20.5 (68.9)	20.9 (69.6)	22.9 (73.2)	25.0 (77.0)	25.6 (78.1)	24.0 (75.2)	23.5 (74.3)	23.5 (74.3)	23.6 (74.5)	23.6 (74.5)	22.9 (73.2)	21.7 (71.1)	23.1 (73.6)
Record low °C (°F)	14.8 (58.6)	16.7 (62.1)	18.3 (64.9)	19.8 (67.6)	20.3 (68.5)	14.3 (57.7)	18.3 (64.9)	21.3 (70.3)	20.8 (69.4)	15.8 (60.4)	17.1 (62.8)	14.8 (58.6)	14.3 (57.7)
Average rainfall mm (inches)	0.1 (0.00)	0.0 (0.0)	0.6 (0.02)	13.2 (0.52)	145.1 (5.71)	1,056 (41.57)	1,247.9 (49.13)	937.1 (36.89)	425.2 (16.74)	219.1 (8.63)	33.5 (1.32)	8.9 (0.35)	4,086.7 (160.89)
Average rainy days	0.1	0.0	0.1	1.1	5.7	23.1	28.4	26.6	16.4	8.9	2.0	0.4	112.9
Average relative humidity (%) (at 17:30 IST)	65	67	68	70	73	86	90	89	85	82	73	67	76
Source: India Meteorological Department

== See also ==
- Maha Ganapathi Mahammaya Temple
