= Chitrapur Saraswat Brahmin =

Brahmin sub-caste in Kokan region, India

Total population
- 25,000 (est.)

Languages
- Konkani

Religion
- Hinduism: Divisions based on Sampradaya: Smarthas; Divisions based on Veda: Rigvedi

Chitrapur Saraswats are a small Konkani-speaking community of Hindu Brahmins in India. They are traditionally found along the Kanara coast and call themselves Bhanaps in the Konkani language.

Susan Bayly says that they were formed from communities engaged in scribal work and commerce and were of "unclear status" until almost the end of the 18th century when they were "Brahmanised" into a caste by some touring Brahmins or gurus. Frank Conlon says they are originally from North India.

== Origin ==
Historian Susan Bayly states that the Ramanandis, who opened up to almost any background were responsible for "Brahmanising" groups of unclear status and Chitrapur Saraswats are one such example. Specifically, she states,

One such case in the Deccan was that of the mixed array of Konkani scribal and commercial specialists who came to be known as members of a single Brahman jati, the Chitrapur Saraswats. Well into the eighteenth century, this group was still in the process of developing a sense of castelike cohesion; this was achieved primarily through bonds of preceptoral affiliation to a line of Brahman renouncer-ascetics with a network of hospices and touring gurus based along the Kanara coast.

== History ==
=== Origins and migration ===
The history of the Chitrapur Saraswat Brahmins is characterised by a long-term migration from North India to the Kanara coast and their subsequent socio-economic evolution during the pre-colonial and colonial periods. According to community tradition and the Sahyadrikhanda of the Skanda Purana, the Saraswats originate from the banks of the now-extinct Sarasvati River in North India. Following the progressive desiccation of the river around 1700 BCE, the community migrated in waves in different directions.

One significant group settled in the Goa region (specifically in Salcette, Tiswadi, and Bardez), where they became known as Gaud Saraswat Brahmins (GSB). During the 16th century, the Goa Inquisition and Portuguese colonial pressure triggered a further southward migration into the Kanara regions of modern-day Karnataka.

=== Formation of the Chitrapur identity ===
The specific identity of the "Chitrapur" Saraswats emerged in the early 18th century. Unlike other Saraswat groups who adopted Vaishnavism under the influence of Madhvacharya, this group remained adherents of the Smarta tradition and the Advaita Vedanta philosophy of Adi Shankara.

In 1708, the first spiritual head, H.H. Parijnanashram I Swamiji, was ordained at Gokarna, marking the formalisation of the community as a distinct administrative and religious unit. In 1757, the community established the Shri Chitrapur Math in Shirali to provide a central religious authority and preceptoral lineage (Guru parampara).

=== Colonial and post independence era ===
Historian Frank Conlon notes that the community successfully navigated the British colonial administration by excelling in English education and administrative services, particularly in cities like Bombay and Mangalore. This period saw the rise of the "Kanara Saraswat Association" (1911) and a significant focus on social reform and cooperative movements led by figures such as Shripad Subrao Talmaki.

Today, the community from India is spread the world over. They have taken names of villages in Karnataka as surnames. So, their recent history is associated with the State of Karnataka. The estimated population of this community is roughly 25,000. The community members refer to themselves as "Bhanaps". The community also has a magazine published every month called Kanara Saraswat from Mumbai which carries articles by members and other news concerning the community.

== Notable people ==
- Shyam Benegal, film director and screenwriter
- Narayan Ganesh Chandavarkar, Indian National Congress politician and Hindu reformer.
- Guru Dutt, film director, producer and actor.
- Suman Kalyanpur, playback singer most notable for her work in Hindi cinema
- Girish Karnad, actor, film director, Kannada-language writer
- Radhika Pandit, actress who primarily works in Kannada cinema.
- Amrita Rao, Bollywood actress
- Karnad Sadashiva Rao, Indian freedom fighter
- Benegal Narsing Rau, Indian civil servant, jurist, diplomat, and statesman known for his key role in drafting the Constitution of India
- Benegal Rama Rau, Indian diplomat, civil servant and the fourth Governor of the Reserve Bank of India.
- Benegal Shiva Rao, Indian journalist and politician who was a member of the Constituent Assembly of India, Lok Sabha and Rajya Sabha.
- Shripad Subrao Talmaki, social reformer and early pioneer of the cooperative movement in India and known as the father of India's cooperative movement.

== See also ==
- Saraswat cuisine
