= Martial race =

British Indian colonial military recruitment theory

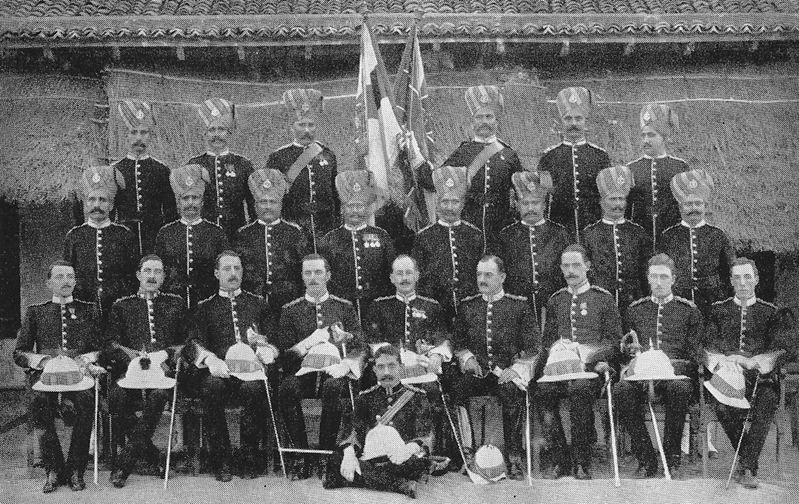
British and Indian officers of the 1st Brahmans, 1912.

Martial race was a designation which was created by army officials in British India after the Indian Rebellion of 1857, in which they classified each caste as belonging to one of two categories, the 'martial' castes and the 'non-martial' castes. The ostensible reason for this system of classification was the belief that a 'martial race' was typically brave and well-built for fighting, while the 'non-martial races' were those races which the British considered unfit for battle because of their sedentary lifestyles. The British had a policy of recruiting the martial Indians from those who has less access to education as they were easier to control.

According to modern historian Jeffrey Greenhut on military history, "The Martial Race theory had an elegant symmetry. Indians who were intelligent and educated were defined as cowards, while those defined as brave were uneducated and backward". According to Amiya Samanta, the martial race was chosen from people of 'mercenary spirit' (a soldier who fights for any group or country that will pay him), as these groups lacked nationalism as a trait. British-trained Indian soldiers were among those who had rebelled in 1857 and thereafter, the Bengal Army abandoned or diminished its recruitment of soldiers who came from the traditional recruiting areas and enacted a new recruitment policy which favored castes whose members had remained loyal to the British Empire.

The concept already had a precedent in Indian culture as one of the four orders (varnas) in the Vedic social system of Hinduism is known as the Kshatriya, literally "warriors". Brahmins were described as 'the oldest martial community', in the past having two of the oldest British Indian regiments, the 1st Brahmans and 3rd Brahmans. Following Indian independence, the Indian government in February 1949 abolished the official application of "martial race" principles with regard to military recruitment, although it continued to be applied formally and informally in certain circumstances. In Pakistan, such principles, although no longer rigidly enforced, have continued to hold considerable sway and have had major consequences for the nation's political life—the most extreme case being the Bangladesh Liberation War, following decades of continued Bengali exclusion from the armed forces.

== Criteria ==
In their attempts to assert control after the Indian Rebellion of 1857, the British faced fierce resistance in some regions while easily subduing others. British officials sought 'martial races' accustomed to hunting, or from agricultural cultures from hilly or mountainous regions with a history of conflict. Others were excluded due to their 'ease of living' or branded as seditious agitators. The doctrine of 'martial races' postulated that the qualities that make a useful soldier are inherited in certain races by birth, and that the rest of the Indian races did not have the requisite traits that would make them warriors.

British general and scholar Lieutenant-General George MacMunn (1869–1952) noted in his writings "It is only necessary for a feeling to arise that it is impious and disgraceful to serve the British, for the whole of our fabric to tumble like a house of cards without a shot being fired or a sword unsheathed". To this end, it became British policy to recruit only from those tribes whom they classified as members of the 'martial races', and the practice became an integral part of the recruitment manuals for the Army in the British Raj.

The British regarded the 'martial races' as valiant and strong but also intellectually inferior, lacking the initiative or leadership qualities to command large military formations and regarded as politically subservient or docile to authority. For these reasons, the martial races theory did not lead to officers being recruited from them; recruitment was based on social class and loyalty to the British Raj. One source calls this a "pseudo-ethnological" construction, which was popularised by Frederick Sleigh Roberts, and created serious deficiencies in troop levels during the World Wars, compelling them to recruit from 'non-martial races'. Winston Churchill was reportedly concerned that the theory was abandoned during the war and wrote to the Commander-in-Chief, India that he must, "rely as much as possible on the martial races".

Critics of the theory state that the Indian rebellion of 1857 may have played a role in reinforcing the British belief in it. During this event the sepoy troops from the Bengal Native Infantry, led by Mangal Pandey, mutinied against the British. Similarly, the Revolt of Rajab Ali from Chittagong also caused trouble with British forces. However, the loyal Rajputs, Jats, Pashtuns, Sikhs, Gurkhas, Kumaunis and Garhwalis did not join the mutiny, and fought on the side of the British Army. From then on, this theory was used to the hilt to accelerate recruitment from among these 'races', while discouraging enlistment of 'disloyal' troops and high-caste Hindus who had sided with the rebel army during the war.

Some authors, such as Heather Streets, argue that the military authorities puffed up the images of the martial soldiers by writing regimental histories, and by extolling the kilted Scots, kukri-wielding Gurkhas and turbaned Sikhs in numerous paintings. Richard Schultz, an American author, has claimed the martial race concept as a supposedly clever British effort to divide and rule the people of India for their own political ends.

== Tribes and groups designated as martial races ==
=== In British colonial times ===
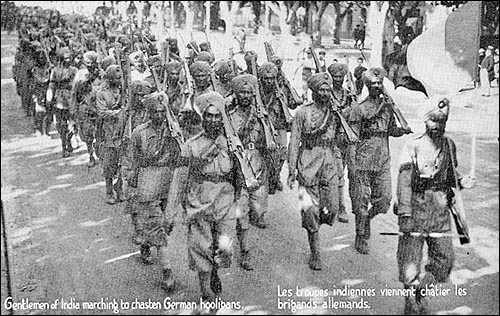
French postcard depicting the arrival of 15th Sikh Regiment in France during World War I. The post card reads, "Gentlemen of India marching to chasten the German hooligans"

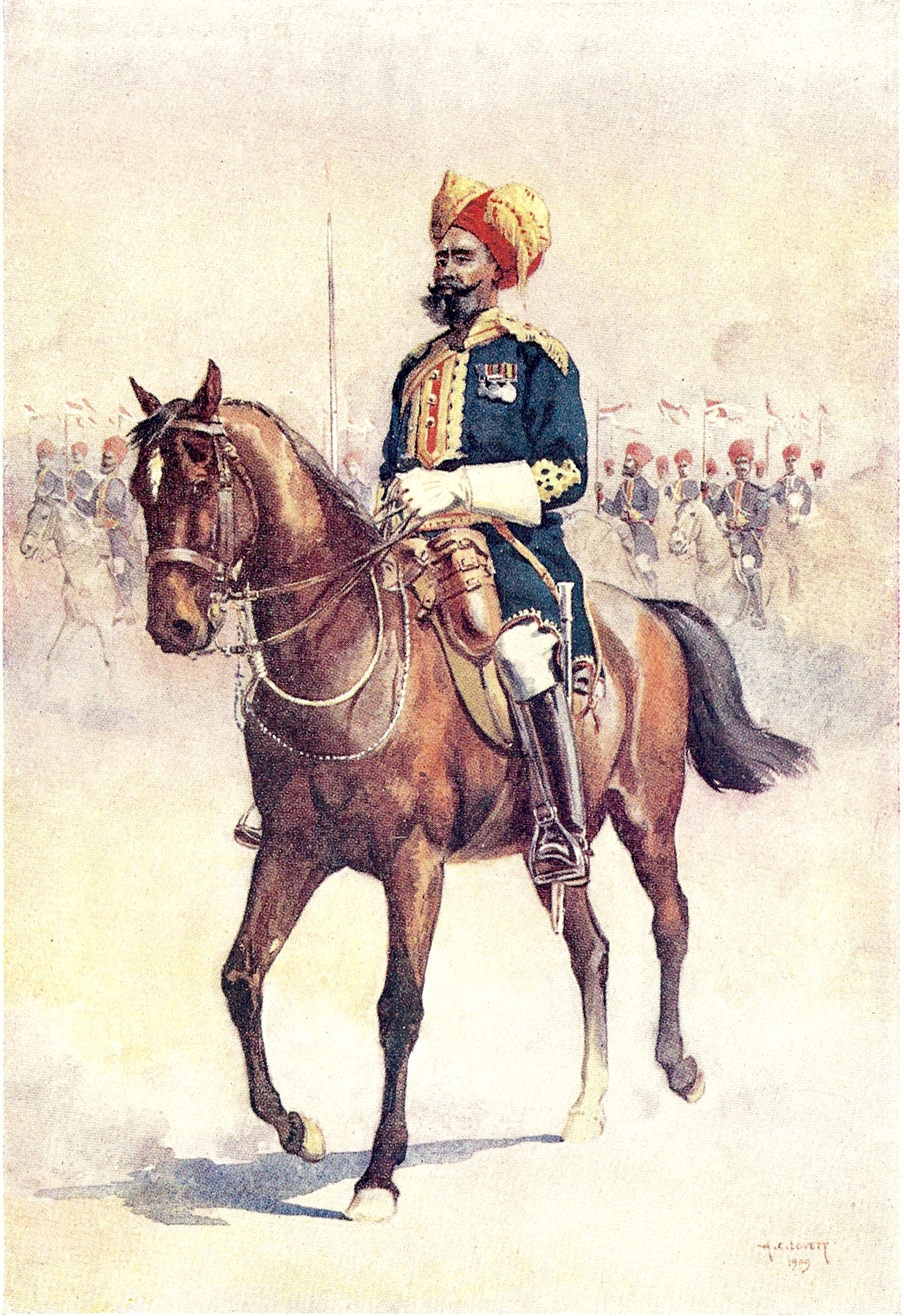
14th Murray's Jat Lancers (Risaldar Major), c. 1909, by AC Lovett (1862–1919)

British-declared martial races in the Indian subcontinent included some groups that were officially designated instead as "agricultural tribes" under the provisions of the Punjab Land Alienation Act of 1900. These terms were considered to be synonymous when the administration compiled a list in 1925. Among the communities listed as martial were:

- Ahir
- Arain
- Awan
- Baloch
- Dogra
- Gakhar
- Gaur Brahmins
- Gurjars
- Janjua
- Jat
- Kamboh
- Kodava
- Khokhar
- Labana
- Mahton
- Mughal
- Saini
- Pathan
- Rajputs
- Rona/Ranas
- Rowthers
- Qureshi
- Sial
- Syed

Communities that were at various times classified as martial races include:

- Sudhan
- Bhumihars
- Garhwali
- Gowdas
- Gurkhas
- Kumaoni
- Marathas
- Mohyal Brahmin
- Agricultural Brahmins of Oudh
- Nairs
- Vellalar
- Kurmi^{[34]}

== Post-colonial period ==
=== India ===
India was quick to formally disclaim the martial races theory after gaining independence. The largest single source of recruitment for the British Indian Army had come from Punjab, with Sikhs and Punjabi Muslims particularly preferred, with the result that at independence over 90% of the new Indian Armed Forces' senior officers came from East Punjab despite the fact that it made up just 5% of the new country's population. Recognizing the destabilising potential of an unrepresentative armed forces, Prime Minister Jawaharlal Nehru soon urged the Commander-in-Chief, India and Defence Secretary to undertake "large scale reform to the armed forces”.

However, while most caste or tribal bars on recruitment were lifted, recruitment in regions populated by the former "martial races" was progressively intensified, with the result that by the beginning of the 1970s, India had more than doubled the number of "martial class" units. The Punjab Regiment, which recruits mainly Sikhs and Dogras, had gone from five to 29 battalions since independence, while the Rajputana Rifles, which is mainly composed of Jats and Rajputs, increased from six to 21 battalions over the same time period. The three states that comprised the former East Punjab—Haryana, Himachal Pradesh, and Punjab—remain substantially over-represented in the contemporary Indian Armed Forces. In the 1968-1971 period, Haryana, which accounted for 2.2% of India's population, accounted for 7.82% of the armed forces' headcount; the figures for Himachal Pradesh were 0.6% of the population, and 4.68% of the armed forces, and for Punjab, 2.6% of the population and 15.3% of the armed forces. By the 1996-97 period, the proportion of the armed forces coming from each state had fallen from 4.7% to 4.4% to Himachal Pradesh, from 7.8% to 5.1% in Haryana, and from 15.3% to 7.6% in Punjab.

=== Pakistan ===
At independence, the new Pakistan Armed Forces likewise reflected the institutional legacy of the "martial races" theory, although it was no longer formally applied there as well. The British preference of Punjabis, combined with the fact that Bengalis (who were the single largest group in the new nation) had been disfavored ever since the Revolt of 1857, led to an even more ethnically lopsided army corps than in India. At the Pakistan Army's establishment in 1947, Punjab, with 25% of the new nation's population, accounted for 72% of the Army's headcount, while East Bengal, with 55% of the total population, was virtually unrepresented. In the Armoured Corps, there was not a single Muslim member from Sindh, Balochistan or Bengal, which together comprised 70% of Pakistan's total population.

This imbalance created tensions, particularly among the Bengalis of East Pakistan, who felt humiliated by the continued belief in the theory which continued to hold sway in West Pakistan, that they were not 'martially inclined' compared to the Punjabis and Pashtuns. Pakistani author Hasan-Askari Rizvi notes that the limited recruitment of Bengali personnel in the Pakistan Army was because the West Pakistanis "could not overcome the hangover of the martial race theory". As a result, in 1955, out of the Pakistan Army's 908-strong officer corps, 894 hailed from West Pakistan and a mere 14 from East Pakistan. Thus, following the coup d'état of 1958, the exclusion of East Pakistani Bengalis from military leadership translated into their exclusion from the nation's political leadership. This deepened the alienation of East Pakistanis from the Pakistani government, which would eventually lead to the independence of Bangladesh.

Furthermore, it has been alleged that the continued influence of the theory among the command of the Pakistan Armed Forces, whose rank and file had largely drawn from the martial races, contributed to an otherwise unjustified confidence that they would easily defeat India in a war, especially prior to the Indo-Pakistani War of 1965. Based on this belief in martial supremacy numerical superiority of the foe could be overcome. Defence writers in Pakistan have noted that the 1971 defeat was partially attributable to the flawed 'martial races' theory which led to wishful thinking that it was possible to defeat the Bengali Rebel Forces based on the theory alone. Author Stephen P. Cohen notes that "Elevating the 'martial races' theory to the level of an absolute truth had domestic implications for Pakistani politics and contributed to the neglect of other aspects of security.".

In contemporary Pakistan, army recruitment still reflects the biases of "martial races" theory, with a considerable over-representation of ethnic Pashtuns and Punjabis, particularly from the Salt Range, and under-representation of Balochis and Sindhis. In the past few decades there have been some efforts to rectify these imbalances and make the Armed Forces more representative, in part by relaxing recruitment standards in Sindh and Balochistan. In 2007 a report published by the Inter-Services Public Relations claimed success bringing the army's composition closer to national demographics; the proportion of Punjabis in the army had fallen from 71% in 2001 to 57% in 2007, and was expected to reach 54% by 2011. In turn, the proportion of Sindhis was expected to increase from 15% to 17%, and Balochis from 3.2% in 2007 to 4% in 2011. The report also projected an increase in the soldiers from Azad Kashmir and Gilgit-Baltistan from 0% to 9% by 2011. However, noting that, for instance, a disproportionately large share of new recruits from Sindh are ethnic Pathans (Pashtuns) rather than Sindhis, critics have alleged that such figures, in measuring provincial origin rather than ethnicity per se, mask continued biases in recruiting.

== See also ==
- Criminal Tribes Act
- Historical definitions of races in India
