= 21st Bengal Native Infantry =

21st Bengal Native Infantry can refer to the

- 1st Battalion, 21st Bengal Native Infantry which became the 1st Brahmans
- 2nd Battalion, 21st Bengal Native Infantry which became the 5th Light Infantry
