= 66th Punjabis =

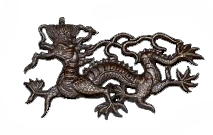
- Active: 1761 - 1922
- Country: British India (East India Company) India
- Branch: British Indian Army; Madras Army
- Type: Infantry
- Size: 2 Battalions
- Nickname: Mackenzie ki Paltan
- Uniform: Red; faced green
- Engagements: First Mysore War 1767-69; Second Mysore War 1780-84; Third Mysore War 1789-92; Fourth Mysore War 1798-99; Bourbon Island 1810; Mauritius 1810; First Anglo-Chinese War 1839-42; Upper Burma 1888-91; First World War 1914-18; Third Afghan War 1919

The 66th Punjabis was an infantry regiment of the British Indian Army. It was raised in 1761 as the 7th Battalion of Coast Sepoys. It was designated as the 66th Punjabis in 1903 and became 2nd Battalion 1st Punjab Regiment in 1922. In 1947, it was allocated to the Pakistan Army, where it continues to exist as 2nd Battalion The Punjab Regiment.

== Early history ==
The regiment had its antecedents in the old Madras Army of the British East India Company, which was largely responsible for the British conquest of south and central India. It was raised by Captain Cowper at Trichonopoly in July 1761, as the 7th Battalion of Coast Sepoys. The men were mostly enlisted from South India and consisted of Muslims and Hindus. For the next forty years, the regiment was engaged in constant warfare against the Sultans of Mysore. In 1810, it took part in the expeditions to Bourbon Island and Mauritius in the Indian Ocean. In 1840, the regiment took part in the First Anglo-Chinese War, where as a reward for its excellent performance, it was authorized to bear a golden dragon wearing the imperial crown upon its regimental colours. In the latter part of the 19th century, the regiment did not see much action except for a stint in Burma during 1888–91.

== 66th Punjabis ==
In 1902, the regiment, now designated as the 6th Madras Infantry, was reconstituted with Punjabi Brahmins, Sikhs and Rajputs. Next year, as a result of the reforms brought about in the Indian Army by Lord Kitchener, all Madras units had 60 added to their numbers, and the regiment's designation was changed to 66th Punjabis. During World War I the 66th Punjabis were dispatched to Mesopotamia as part of the 12th Indian Division in 1915. After taking part in the Battle of Shaiba, where the Turkish counter-attack was repulsed, the regiment participated in the operations in Persian Arabistan. In October, the 66th Punjabis joined Major General Charles Townshend's 6th Indian Division in its advance towards Baghdad. It fought in the Battle of Ctesiphon and then retired towards Kut al Amara, where it was besieged by the Turks with the rest of the 6th Division. The regiment resolutely resisted all Turkish attempts to overwhelm the defences of Kut al Amara for 150 days, but after the failure of the British to relieve them, the starving garrison of Kut was forced to surrender on 29 April 1916. The 66th Punjabis became prisoners of war and suffered terrible privations during their long captivity. Out of the 538 officers and men present in the regiment on 14 March, only about a quarter returned home after the war. The 66th Punjabis were re-formed at Jhelum on 31 December 1916. They served on the North West Frontier of India and took part in the Third Afghan War of 1919. On 5 October 1918, the regiment raised a second battalion at Sitapur, which was disbanded in 1921.

== Subsequent history ==
After the First World War, the 66th Punjabis were grouped with the 62nd, 76th, 82nd and 84th Punjabis, and the 1st Brahmans to form the 1st Punjab Regiment in 1922. The battalion was redesignated as 2nd Battalion 1st Punjab Regiment. During the Second World War, 2/1st Punjab served in Burma, fighting with great gallantry in the First and Second Arakan Campaigns and in numerous actions during the Reconquest of Burma. The battalion received more gallantry awards than any other Indian Army unit. These included a posthumous Victoria Cross to Subedar Ram Sarup Singh for gallantry in action on Kennedy Peak in 1944. After the war, 2/1st Punjab served in the Dutch East Indies as part of the Allied occupation forces. In 1947, the battalion was allocated to Pakistan Army. During the 1948 war with India in Kashmir, the battalion again distinguished itself and Captain Muhammad Sarwar became the first recipient of Nishan-i-Haider, Pakistan's highest gallantry award. In 1956, the 1st Punjab Regiment was merged with the 14th, 15th and 16th Punjab Regiments to form one large Punjab Regiment, and 2/1st Punjab was redesignated as 2 Punjab. The battalion's remarkable record of service was maintained in the Indo-Pakistan War of 1965, where it fought with great gallantry in the Battle of Chawinda. In the Indo-Pakistan War of 1971, it served in Kasur Sector.

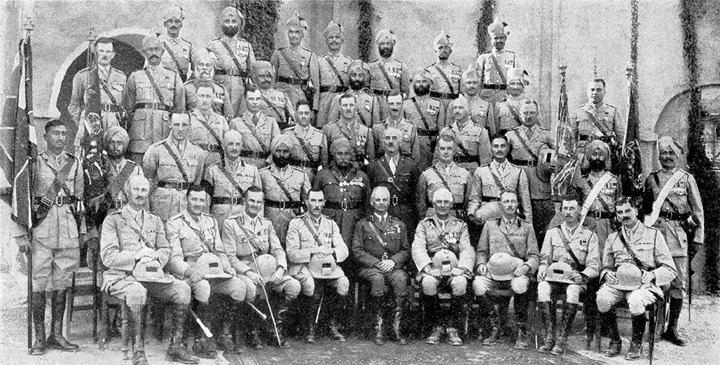
Group photograph with Field Marshal Sir William Birdwood, C-in-C in India, on occasion of Colour Presentation to the 2nd Battalion 1st Punjab Regiment, Kohat, November 1931.

== Genealogy ==
- 1761 7th Battalion of Coast Sepoys
- 1769 7th Carnatic Battalion
- 1770 6th Carnatic Battalion
- 1784 6th Madras Battalion
- 1796 1st Battalion 6th Regiment of Madras Native Infantry
- 1824 6th Regiment of Madras Native Infantry
- 1885 6th Regiment of Madras Infantry
- 1901 6th Madras Infantry
- 1903 66th Punjabis
- 1922 2nd Battalion 1st Punjab Regiment
- 1956 2nd Battalion The Punjab Regiment

== See also ==
- 1st Punjab Regiment
- Punjab Regiment
