= 82nd Punjabis =

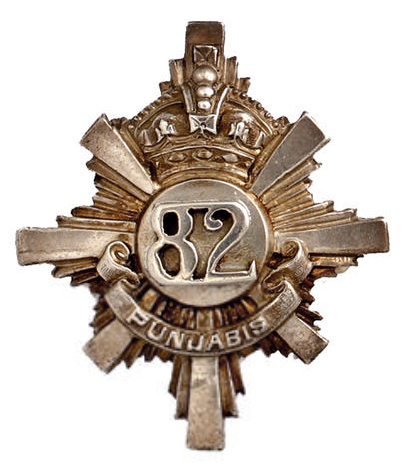
- Active: 1903 – 1922
- Country: British India
- Branch: Army
- Type: Infantry
- Size: 1 Battalion
- Nickname(s): Dalrymple ki Paltan
- Uniform: Red; faced emerald green
- Engagements: Third Mysore War 1789-92; Fourth Mysore War 1798-99; Second Mahratta War 1803-06; First Burma War 1824-26; Upper Burma 1890-93; First World War 1914-18; Third Afghan War 1919

The 82nd Punjabis was an infantry regiment of the British Indian Army. It was raised in 1788, as the 29th Madras Battalion. It was designated as the 82nd Punjabis in 1903 and became the 5th Battalion 1st Punjab Regiment in 1922. In 1947, it was allocated to the Pakistan Army, where it continues to exist as 4th Battalion The Punjab Regiment.

== Early history ==
The regiment had its antecedents in the old Madras Army of the British East India Company, which was largely responsible for the British conquest of south and central India. Captain James Dalrymple at Ellore in November 1788, as the 29th Madras Battalion. Next year, it took part in the Third Mysore War. In 1799, it took part in the Seringapatam. Four years later, it was engaged in the Second Mahratta War, while in 1824, it moved to Burma to take part in the First Burma War. It returned to Burma in 1890, and was engaged in the pacification of Upper Burma following the Third Anglo-Burmese War.

== 82nd Punjabis ==
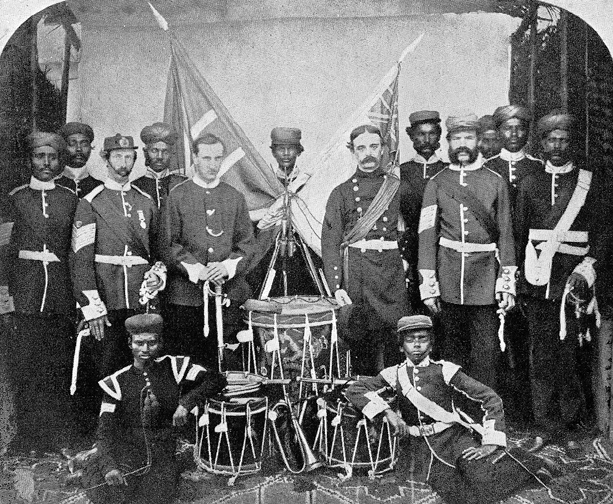
22nd Regiment of Madras Native Infantry, 1861.

In 1903, the regiment, now designated as the 22nd Madras Infantry, was reconstituted with Punjabi Muslims, Hazarawals, Sikhs and Hindu Jats. As a result of the reforms brought about in the Indian Army by Lord Kitchener, all Madras units had 60 added to their numbers, and the regiment's designation was changed to 82nd Punjabis. On the outbreak of the First World War in 1914, the 82nd Punjabis were serving on the North West Frontier of India. In January 1916, they were dispatched to Mesopotamia, where they were engaged in the desperate British efforts to relieve the besieged garrison at Kut al Amara. The regiment suffered 223 casualties in the Battle of Dujaila Redoubt in March 1916. In January 1917, it fought in the Battle of the Hai Salient and then took part in the British advance towards Baghdad. In the fierce fighting at Shumran, while crossing the River Tigris, the regiment again suffered heavy casualties. After capture of Baghdad on 15 March, the 82nd Punjabis remained employed on guard duties, first at Baghdad, and then on the Persian frontier. They returned home in February 1919, and later that year, participated in the Third Afghan War.

== Subsequent History ==
After the First World War, the 82nd Punjabis were grouped with the 62nd, 66th, 76th and 84th Punjabis, and the 1st Brahmans to form the 1st Punjab Regiment in 1922. The battalion was redesignated as 5th Battalion 1st Punjab Regiment. During the Second World War, 5/1st Punjab fought in the Burmese Campaign. After the Japanese invasion of Burma, the battalion fought in a number of rear-guard actions, as the British retreated a thousand miles to India. In 1944, it fought in the Second Arakan Campaign, and then took part in the Reconquest of Burma. After the war, the battalion was sent to Japan as part of the British Commonwealth Occupation Force. In 1947, the 1st Punjab Regiment was allocated to Pakistan Army. In 1956, it was merged with the 14th, 15th and 16th Punjab Regiments to form one large Punjab Regiment, and 5/1st Punjab was redesignated as 4 Punjab. During the 1965 Indo-Pakistan War, the battalion fought at Suleimanki, while in the 1971 war, it again distinguished itself in the Battle of Chhamb.

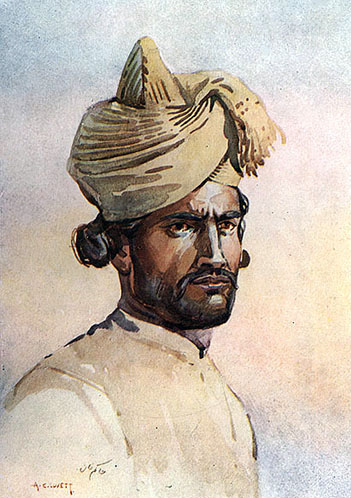
Sepoy 82nd Punjabis. Watercolour by Major AC Lovett, 1910.

== Genealogy ==
- 1788 29th Madras Battalion
- 1796 2nd Battalion 11th Regiment of Madras Native Infantry
- 1824 22nd Regiment of Madras Native Infantry
- 1885 22nd Regiment of Madras Infantry
- 1901 22nd Madras Infantry
- 1903 82nd Punjabis
- 1922 5th Battalion 1st Punjab Regiment
- 1956 4th Battalion The Punjab Regiment

== See also ==
- 1st Punjab Regiment
- Punjab Regiment
