= 76th Punjabis =

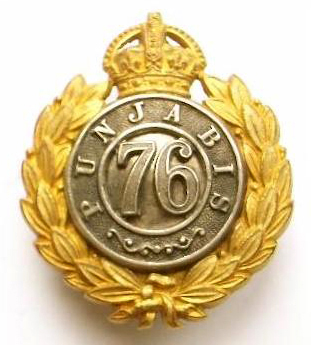
- Active: 1903–1922
- Country: British India
- Branch: Army
- Type: Infantry
- Size: 2 Battalions
- Nickname(s): Lane ki Paltan
- Uniform: Red; faced emerald green
- Engagements: Pondicherry 1778; Second Mysore War 1780–84; Third Mysore War 1789–92; Fourth Mysore War 1798–99; First Burma War 1824–26; Third Burma War 1885–87; First World War 1914–18; Third Afghan War 1919

Commanders
- Colonel of the Regiment: Major General Henry S Elton

The 76th Punjabis was an infantry regiment of the British Indian Army. It was raised by Captain Thomas Lane at Trichonopoly on 16 December 1776, as the 16th Carnatic Battalion. It was designated as the 76th Punjabis in 1903 and became the 3rd Battalion 1st Punjab Regiment in 1922. In 1947, it was allocated to the Pakistan Army, where it continues to exist as 3rd Battalion The Punjab Regiment.

== Early history ==
The regiment had its antecedents in the old Madras Army of the British East India Company, which was largely responsible for the British conquest of south and central India. It was raised by Captain Thomas Lane at Trichonopoly on 16 December 1776, as the 16th Carnatic Battalion. The regiment's first action was in 1778, when it took part in the capture of the French enclave of Pondicherry. During the next twenty years, the regiment was engaged in constant warfare against the Sultans of Mysore, fighting in the Battles of Pollilur, Porto Novo, Sholinghur and Seringapatam. In the nineteenth century, it fought in the First and Third Anglo-Burmese Wars.

== 76th Punjabis ==
In 1903, the regiment, now designated as the 16th Madras Infantry, was reconstituted with Punjabi Muslims, Sikhs and Hindu Brahmins. As a result of the reforms brought about in the Indian Army by Lord Kitchener, all Madras units had 60 added to their numbers, and the regiment's designation was changed to 76th Punjabis. On the outbreak of the First World War in 1914, the 76th Punjabis were dispatched to Egypt to protect the Suez Canal. In March 1915, they arrived in Mesopotamia to join the 12th Indian Division. After taking part in the Battle of Shaiba, where the Turkish counter-attack was repulsed, the regiment participated in the operations in Persian Arabistan. In June and July, the 76th Punjabis took part in the operations along the River Euphrates, which led to the capture of Nasiriyah. In August, the regiment joined Major General Charles Townshend's 6th Indian Division in its advance towards Baghdad. It fought in the Battle of Ctesiphon and then retired towards Kut al Amara, where it was besieged by the Turks with the rest of the 6th Division. The regiment resolutely resisted all Turkish attempts to overwhelm the defences of Kut al Amara, suffering 171 casualties during the 150 days long siege. But after the failure of the British to relieve them, the starving garrison of Kut was forced to surrender on 29 April 1916. The 76th Punjabis became prisoners of war and suffered terrible privations during their long captivity. Out of the 341 officers men present with the regiment at the commencement of the siege in December 1915, 72 died during the siege, while another 101 died during the captivity. The 76th Punjabis were re-formed on 1 January 1917 and moved to Chaman on the North West Frontier. On 16 October 1917, the regiment raised a second battalion at Nasirabad. In December 1918, 208 Kut prisoners returned to the battalion after their release from Turkish captivity. The 1st Battalion 76th Punjabis took part in the Third Afghan War of 1919, while the 2nd Battalion served in Waziristan during 1919–20. It was disbanded in 1922.

== Subsequent History ==
In 1922, the 76th Punjabis were grouped with the 62nd, 66th, 82nd and 84th Punjabis, and the 1st Brahmans to form the 1st Punjab Regiment, and were redesignated as 3rd Battalion 1st Punjab Regiment. On the outbreak of the Second World War, 3/1st Punjab was dispatched to North Africa in September 1939. In December 1940, the battalion fought in the Battle of Sidi Barani against the invading Italians. It then fought in Eritrea and Syria, before returning to North Africa to take part in a gallant attack on Libyan Omar on 30 November 1941. The battalion arrived in Italy in March 1944, where it remained engaged in intense fighting until the final Allied victory in 1945. The battalion suffered 1651 casualties during the war, including four Commanding Officers, who fell leading their men in battle. In 1947, the 1st Punjab Regiment was allocated to Pakistan Army. In 1956, it was merged with the 14th, 15th and 16th Punjab Regiments to form one large Punjab Regiment, and 3/1st Punjab was redesignated as 3 Punjab. During the 1965 Indo-Pakistan War, the battalion fought at Jassar in the Sialkot Sector, while in the 1971 war, it took part in capture of the Indian fortress of Qaisar-i-Hind in the Hussainiwala Sector.

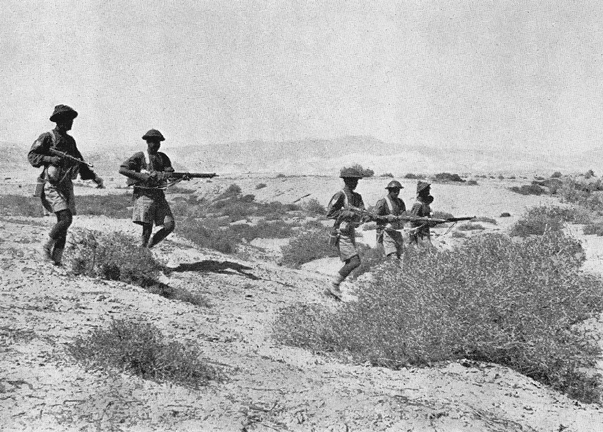
3/1st Punjab in the Libyan Desert, 1942.

== Genealogy ==
- 1776 16th Carnatic Battalion
- 1784 16th Madras Battalion
- 1796 2nd Battalion 5th Regiment of Madras Native Infantry
- 1824 16th Regiment of Madras Native Infantry
- 1885 16th Regiment of Madras Infantry
- 1901 16th Madras Infantry
- 1903 76th Punjabis
- 1917 1st Battalion 76th Punjabis
- 1922 3rd Battalion 1st Punjab Regiment
- 1956 3rd Battalion The Punjab Regiment

== See also ==
- 1st Punjab Regiment
- Punjab Regiment
