= 33rd Bengal Native Infantry =

The 33rd Bengal Native Infantry could refer to:

- 4th Prince Albert Victor's Rajputs in 1824
- 33rd Punjabis in 1861
