= 4th Regiment of Bengal Native Infantry =

Regiment of Bengal

The 4th Regiment of Bengal Native Infantry was formed under that name in 1824. It took part in the Indian Rebellion of 1857.

== Chronology ==
- 1759 raised in Midnapore - name unknown
- 1763 ranked the 16th Battalion of Bengal Native Infantry
- 1764 became the 14th Battalion of Bengal Native Infantry under Captain Hampton
- 1765 posted to the 3rd Brigade
- 1773 became known as the 14th (Blane) Battalion of Bengal Native Infantry under Captain Blane
- 1775 became the 19th Battalion of Bengal Native Infantry
- 1781 became the 13th Regiment of Bengal Native Infantry under Major Blane
- 1796 became the 2nd Battalion 1st Regiment of Bengal Native Infantry
- 1824 became the 4th Regiment of Bengal Native Infantry
- 1857 mutinied at Phillour 26 May

In 1861, after the mutiny, the title was given to the 33rd Bengal Native Infantry which later became the 4th Bengal Regiment of Bengal Native Infantry.
