= 12th Madras Native Infantry =

The 12th Madras Native Infantry may refer to:

- 84th Punjabis which was the 2nd Battalion, 12th Madras Native Infantry in 1797
- 72nd Punjabis which was called the 12th Madras Native Infantry in 1824
