= 3rd Regiment of Bengal Native Infantry =

Regiment of Bengal

The 3rd Regiment of the Bengal Native Infantry was a unit in the Bengal Native Infantry that was formed in 1758 and mutinied in 1857 before being disbanded.

== Chronology ==
- 1758 raised - name unknown ranked as 10th Battalion
- 1763 known as the Swinton Battalion after Captain Swinton
- 1764 became the 13th Battalion of Bengal Native Infantry
- 1765 posted to the 1st Brigade
- 1775 became the 6th Battalion of Bengal Native Infantry
- 1781 became the 6th Regiment of Bombay Native Infantry
- 1784 became the 6th Regiment of Bengal Native Infantry
- 1786 became the 6th Battalion of Bengal Native Infantry
- 1796 became the 1st Battalion 6th Regiment of Bengal Native Infantry
- 1824 became the 3rd Regiment of Bengal Native Infantry
- 1857 mutinied at Phillour 26 May but loyal portion formed part of the Loyal Purbeah Regiment

In 1861, after the mutiny, the title was given to the 32nd Regiment of Bengal Native Infantry which later became the 3rd Regiment of Bengal Native Infantry.
