= 7th Carnatic Battalion =

7th Carnatic Battalion could refer to:

- 66th Punjabis in 1769
- 67th Punjabis in 1770
