= 1st Punjab Regiment =

Former infantry regiment of the armies of British India and Pakistan

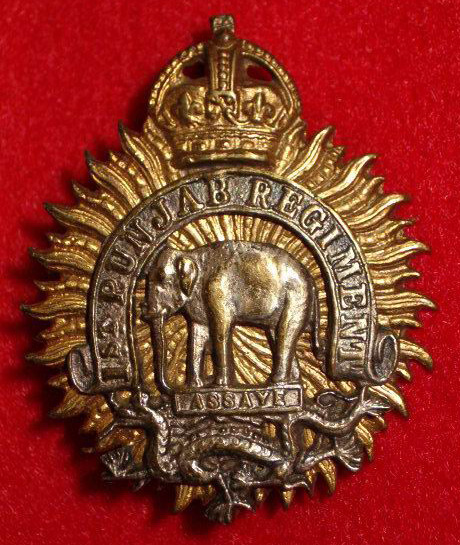
- Regimental cap badge of the 1st
- Active: 1922–1956
- Country: British India (1922–1947); Pakistan (1947–1956)
- Branch: British Indian Army; Pakistan Army
- Type: Infantry
- Regimental Centre: Jhelum
- Uniform colours: Scarlet, green
- Engagements: Battle of Wandiwash; 1763 Siege of Madura; First Anglo−Mysore War; 1778 Siege of Pondicherry; Second Anglo−Mysore War; Third Anglo−Mysore War; Fourth Anglo−Mysore War; Second Anglo−Maratha War; Travancore Rebellion of 1808–1809; 1810 Invasion of Île Bonaparte; 1810 Invasion of Isle de France; Anglo−Nepalese War; Third Anglo−Maratha War; First Anglo−Burmese War; 1826 Siege of Bharatpur; Coorg War of 1834; First Anglo−Afghan War; First Opium War; Indian Rebellion of 1857; Second Anglo−Afghan War; Third Anglo−Burmese War; Lushai Expedition; World War I; Third Anglo−Afghan War; World War II; First Indo−Pakistani War

Commanders
- Colonel of the Regiment: Field Marshal Sir Claude Auchinleck (GCB, GCIE, CSI, DSO, OBE)

The 1st Punjab Regiment was an infantry regiment of the British Indian Army from 1922 to 1947. Upon the Partition of India, it was transferred to the newly raised Pakistan Army. It ceased to exist in this form in 1956, when it was amalgamated with the 14th, 15th and 16th Punjab regiments to form the Punjab Regiment, a still existing infantry regiment of the Pakistan Army.

== History ==
=== Madras Army ===
The 1st Punjab Regiment had its antecedents in the old Madras Army of the British East India Company, which was largely responsible for the establishment of British rule in south and central India. Its senior battalion was raised as the 3rd Battalion of Coast Sepoys in 1759, making it the senior-most surviving infantry battalion of the British Indian Army. The 2nd Battalion was raised in 1761 as the 7th Battalion of Coast Sepoys, while the 3rd Battalion was raised in 1776 as the 16th Carnatic Battalion. This was followed by the 5th Battalion in 1788 as 29th Madras Battalion and the 10th Battalion in 1794 as 34th Madras Battalion. These battalions underwent several changes in nomenclature until 1824, when they were designated as the 2nd, 6th, 16th, 22nd and 24th Regiments of Madras Native Infantry. Their men were mostly enlisted from South India and consisted of Muslims and Hindus. The 4th Battalion was an oddity as being a survivor of the Bengal Army, most of whose units were disbanded following the Indian Rebellion of 1857–58. It was raised in 1776 as the 30th Battalion of Bengal Sepoys. In 1861, it was designated as the 1st Regiment of Bengal Native Infantry. It mostly recruited Hindu Brahmans from Oudh.

All the battalions of the regiment played an important role in the early military campaigns of the East India Company and were actively engaged in the wars against the French, Mysore and the Marathas. Their first major engagement was the decisive Battle of Wandiwash in 1760, which ended French colonial ambitions in India. This was followed by forty years of constant warfare against the Sultans of Mysore, and then the Marathas chieftains. In the Second Maratha War of 1803–05, the 1st and 10th Battalions fought in the Battle of Assaye under General Arthur Wellesley, the future Duke of Wellington, while the 4th Battalion fought in the Battles of Laswari and Agra in 1803, and Bhurtpore in 1805. The performance of the 1st and 10th at Assaye was much appreciated and they were permitted the word "Assaye" with the device of an elephant on their colours and appointments. The two battalions were again engaged against the Marathas during the Third Maratha War of 1817–19, which decisively broke the Maratha power in India.

The regiment also made overseas forays, when the 2nd and 10th Battalions took part in the expeditions to Bourbon Island and Mauritius in the Indian Ocean in 1810, and the 3rd and 5th served in the First Anglo-Burmese War of 1824–26. In 1840, the 1st and 2nd Battalions took part in the First Anglo-Chinese War. Their performance was much appreciated and as a reward, they were the only two battalions of the Indian Army authorized to bear a golden dragon wearing the imperial crown upon their regimental colours along with the battle honour of "China". In the latter part of the 19th century, the regiment did not see much action, although all of its battalions served in Burma.

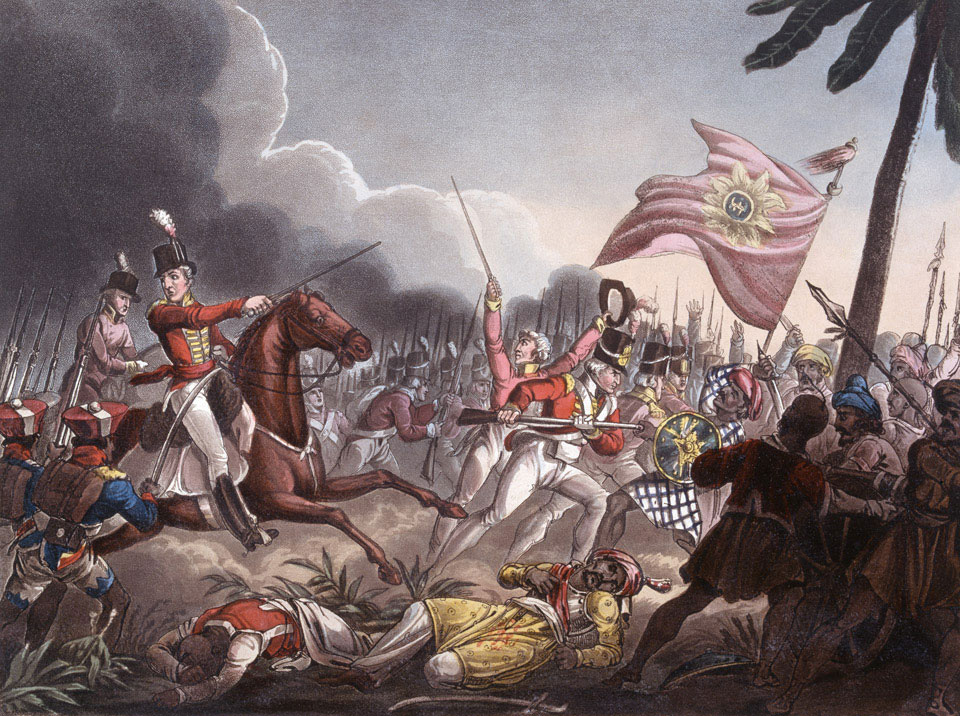
General Arthur Wellesley, later Duke of Wellington, directing the 2/12th Madras Native Infantry (10/1st Punjab), at the Battle of Assaye, 1803. Painting by JC Stadler c. 1815.

After the conquest of Sindh and the Punjab in the 1840s, British focus shifted towards the northwest and the Madras Army was largely reduced to garrison duties. This greatly affected its morale and efficiency. By the turn of the century, the reputation of Madrassi units had suffered considerably and they were either disbanded or reconstituted with northerners. Among the latter were the five battalions, which would go on to form the 1st Punjab Regiment in 1922. In 1902, the South Indians were mustered out and replaced with Punjabi Muslims, Jat Sikhs and Rajputs in the 1st, 2nd and 10th Battalions. Next year, the 3rd and 5th Battalions were also reconstituted with Punjabi Muslims, Sikh Jats and Hindu Jats. Under the Kitchener Reforms of 1903, these battalions were redesignated as the 62nd, 66th, 76th, 82nd and 84th Punjabis; thus severing almost a hundred and fifty years of association with Madras. Meanwhile, the 1st Bengal Infantry was redesignated as the 1st Brahmans.

=== First World War ===
During the First World War, except for the 1st Brahmans, all battalions of the regiment served in the Mesopotamian Campaign, while the 62nd and 76th Punjabis also served at Suez Canal during the Turkish offensive of 1915. Captain Claude Auchinleck, later Field Marshal and the last Commander-in-Chief of the British Indian Army, served with the 62nd Punjabis in Egypt and Mesopotamia.

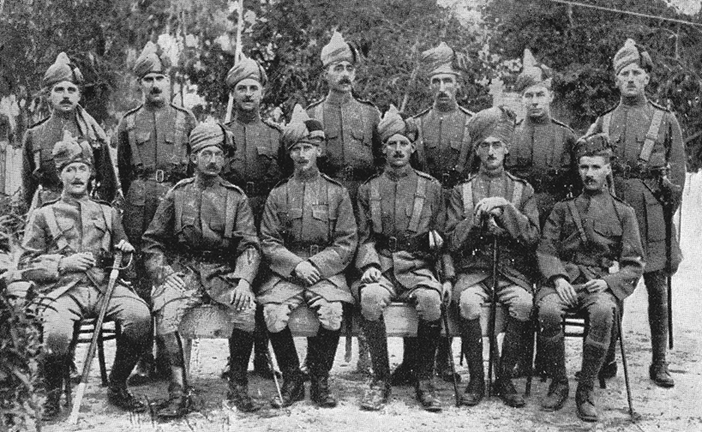
Officers of the 62nd Punjabis (1/1st Punjab), Ismailia, Egypt, 1914. Captain Claude Auchinleck is standing on far right.

- 62nd Punjabis – Egypt, Mesopotamia, Aden.
- 66th Punjabis – Mesopotamia. Captured by the Turks at Kut al Amara in 1915. Re-formed 1916.
- 2/66th Punjabis – Raised in 1918 – India. Disbanded 1921.
- 76th Punjabis – Egypt, Mesopotamia. Captured by the Turks at Kut al Amara in 1915. Re-formed 1917.
- 2/76th Punjabis – Raised in 1917 – India. Disbanded 1922.
- 1st Brahmans – North West Frontier of India, Aden.
- 2/1st Brahmans – Raised in 1917 – India. Disbanded.
- 82nd Punjabis – North West Frontier of India, Mesopotamia.
- 84th Punjabis – North West Frontier of India, Mesopotamia, Salonika, Russia, Turkey.

In 1919, the 66th, 76th and 82nd Punjabis participated in the Third Afghan War. In 1921–22 a major reorganization was undertaken in the British Indian Army leading to the formation of large infantry groups of four to six battalions in 1922. Among these was the 1st Punjab Regiment; most senior among the infantry regiments of the Indian Army. The line-up of battalions for the 1st Punjabis was:

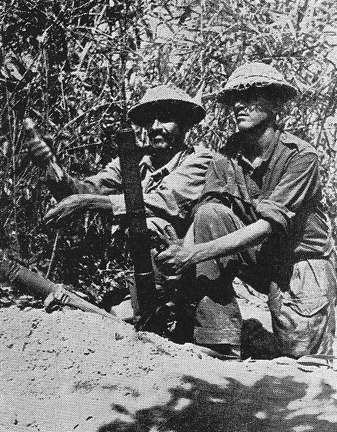
Mortar of 2/1st Punjab in action. The Arakan, Burma, 1944.

- 62nd Punjabis – 1st Battalion 1st Punjab Regiment
- 66th Punjabis – 2nd Battalion 1st Punjab Regiment
- 76th Punjabis – 3rd Battalion 1st Punjab Regiment
- 1st Brahmans – 4th Battalion 1st Punjab Regiment
- 82nd Punjabis – 5th Battalion 1st Punjab Regiment
- 84th Punjabis – 10th (Training) Battalion 1st Punjab Regiment
- 1st (Territorial) Battalion 62nd Punjabis – 11th (Territorial) Battalion 1st Punjab Regiment

The new class composition of the 1st Punjab Regiment, based at Jhelum, was Punjabi Muslims, Rajputs, Muslims from Hazara and Sikhs. The Elephant of Assaye and the Imperial Dragon superimposed over the Star of India were chosen as its new emblem. The regiment's uniform was scarlet with green facings. In the inter-war period, the 1st Punjab Regiment saw extensive service on the North West Frontier of India. In 1931, the 4th Battalion was disbanded due to retrenchment in the Indian Army. In 1937, King George VI was gazetted as the Colonel-in-Chief of the 1st Punjab Regiment.

=== Second World War ===
- 1st Battalion – India, Iraq, North Africa, Burma, Singapore, Dutch East Indies.
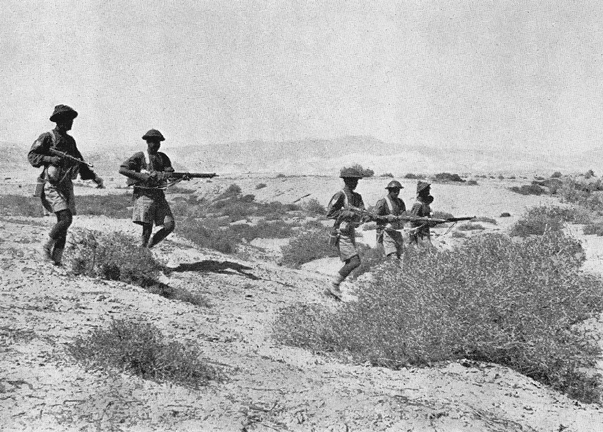
  3/1st Punjab in the Libyan Desert, 1942.
- 2nd Battalion – India, Burma, Dutch East Indies.
- 3rd Battalion – India, North Africa, Eritrea, Syria, Italy.
- 5th Battalion – India, Burma, Occupation of Japan 1945 - 1947.
- 6th Battalion – Raised in 1940. Captured at Singapore by the Japanese in February 1942.
- 7th Battalion – Raised in 1941. India, Andamans, Singapore.
- 8th Battalion – Raised 1941. Converted into 6th (1st Punjab) Light Anti Aircraft Regiment. India. Redesignated as the 28th (Punjab) Para Light Anti Aircraft Regiment in 1947. Disbanded later that year.
- 9th Battalion – Redesignation of the 11th (Territorial) Battalion on regularization in 1941. Transferred to the Royal Indian Navy in 1943.
- 10th (Training) Battalion – Redesignated as the 1st Punjab Regimental Centre in 1943.
- 11th (Territorial) Battalion – Converted to active status and redesignated as 9/1st Punjab in June 1941.
- 14th Battalion – Raised in 1942. India. Disbanded 1947. Re-raised 1948.
- 15th Battalion – Raised in 1942. India. Disbanded 1946.
- 16th Battalion – Raised as the 25th Garrison Battalion in 1941. Redesignated as 16/1st Punjab in 1943 and converted into a training battalion. Disbanded 1946.
- 25th (Garrison) Battalion – Raised in 1942. India. Redesignated as 16/1st Punjab in 1943.
- 26th (Garrison) Battalion – Raised in 1942. India. Disbanded 1943.

During the Second World War, the 1st Punjab Regiment suffered a total of 5510 casualties, including 1291 killed. The 2nd Battalion received more gallantry awards than any other unit of the Indian Army. These included a posthumous Victoria Cross to Subedar Ram Sarup Singh for gallantry in action on Kennedy Peak in Burma in 1944, and a Distinguished Service Order to Lieutenant Colonel Sarbjit Singh Kalha for his actions on the Ngakyedauk Pass in Burma in 1944. The 3rd Battalion was nominated for parachute training in June 1946 to join the 2nd Indian Airborne Division. However, soon after completing its training in 1947, the 3rd (Para) Battalion 1st Punjab Regiment was engaged in quelling communal riots and in July, was detailed to join the Punjab Boundary Force, formed to keep the peace on the new East-West Punjab border. The 5th Battalion was sent to Japan as part of the British Commonwealth Occupation Force.

=== Post-independence history ===
On the independence of Pakistan in 1947, the 1st Punjab Regiment was allotted to Pakistan Army. At the time, the active battalions were 1st, 2nd, 3rd, 5th and 7th. Sikhs and Rajputs were transferred to the Indian Army and the regiment's new class composition was fixed as Punjabis and Pathans. In November, Field Marshal Sir Claude Auchinleck, Supreme Commander of the Indian and Pakistan Armies was appointed Colonel of the 1st Punjab Regiment and the regiment was authorized to wear a grass-green hackle with regimental berets. In 1948, the 14th Battalion was re-raised in response to the war with India in Kashmir, where the 2nd Battalion again distinguished itself and Captain Muhammad Sarwar became the first recipient of Nishan-i-Haider, Pakistan's highest gallantry award. In 1956, a major reorganization was undertaken in the Pakistan Army and larger infantry groups were created by amalgamating the existing infantry regiments. As a result, the 1st Punjab Regiment was amalgamated with the 14th, 15th and 16th Punjab Regiments to form one large Punjab Regiment. The four regimental centres were also merged and the combined centre moved to Mardan. The line up of the new regiment was:

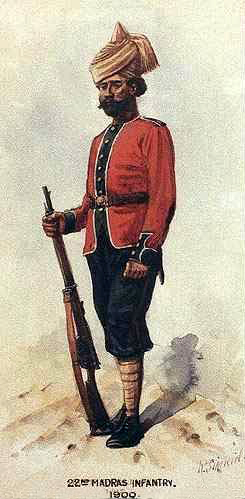
Sepoy, 22nd Madras Infantry (5/1st Punjab), 1900. Painting by Richard Simkin.

- 1 Punjab – 1/1st Punjab
- 2 Punjab – 2/1st Punjab
- 3 Punjab – 3/1st Punjab
- 4 Punjab – 5/1st Punjab
- 5 Punjab – 1/14th Punjab
- 6 Punjab – 2/14th Punjab (Duke of Cambridge's Own)
- 7 Punjab – 3/14th Punjab
- 8 Punjab – 4/14th Punjab
- 9 Punjab – 1/15th Punjab
- 10 Punjab – 2/15th Punjab
- 11 Punjab – 3/15th Punjab
- 12 Punjab – 4/15th Punjab
- 13 Punjab – 1/16th Punjab
- 14 Punjab – 2/16th Punjab
- 15 Punjab – 3/16th Punjab
- 16 Punjab – 5/14th Punjab (Pathans)
- 17 Punjab – 4/16th Punjab (Bhopal)
- 18 Punjab – 7/1st Punjab (The Desert Hawks)
- 19 Punjab – 7/16th Punjab
- 20 Punjab – 14/1st Punjab

== Battle honours ==
Sholinghur, Carnatic, Mysore, Seringapatam, Assaye, Leswarree, Bourbon, Nagpore, Ava, Bhurtpore, China, Burma 1885–87, Suez Canal, Egypt 1915, Shaiba, Kut al Amara 1915, Ctesiphon, Defence of Kut al Amara, Tigris 1916, Kut al Amara 1917, Baghdad, Mesopotamia 1915–18, Aden, NW Frontier India 1915, Afghanistan 1919, Agordat, Keren, Abyssinia 1940–41, Damascus, Syria 1941, Sidi Barrani, Omars, Benghazi, Gazala, Defence of Alamein Line, El Alamein, North Africa 1940–43, Arezzo, Advance to Florence, Gothic Line, The Senio, Italy 1943–45, Pyuntaza-Shwegyin, Yenengyaung 1942, Monywa 1942, Donbaik, Htizwe, North Arakan, Buthidaung, Razabil, Mayu Tunnels, Maungdaw, Ngakyedauk Pass, Imphal, Tamu Road, Litan, Kanglatongbi, Kohima, Defence of Kohima, Relief of Kohima, Jail Hill, Ukhrul, Kennedy Peak, Kalewa, Meiktila, Defence of Meiktila, Taungtha, The Irrawaddy, Rangoon Road, Pyawbwe, Shwemyo Bluff, Pyinmana, Toungoo, Pegu 1945, Sittang 1945, Ramree, Burma 1942–45, Kashmir 1948.

== See also ==
- Punjab Regiment
