= 1st Regiment of Bengal Native Infantry =

Regiment of Bengal

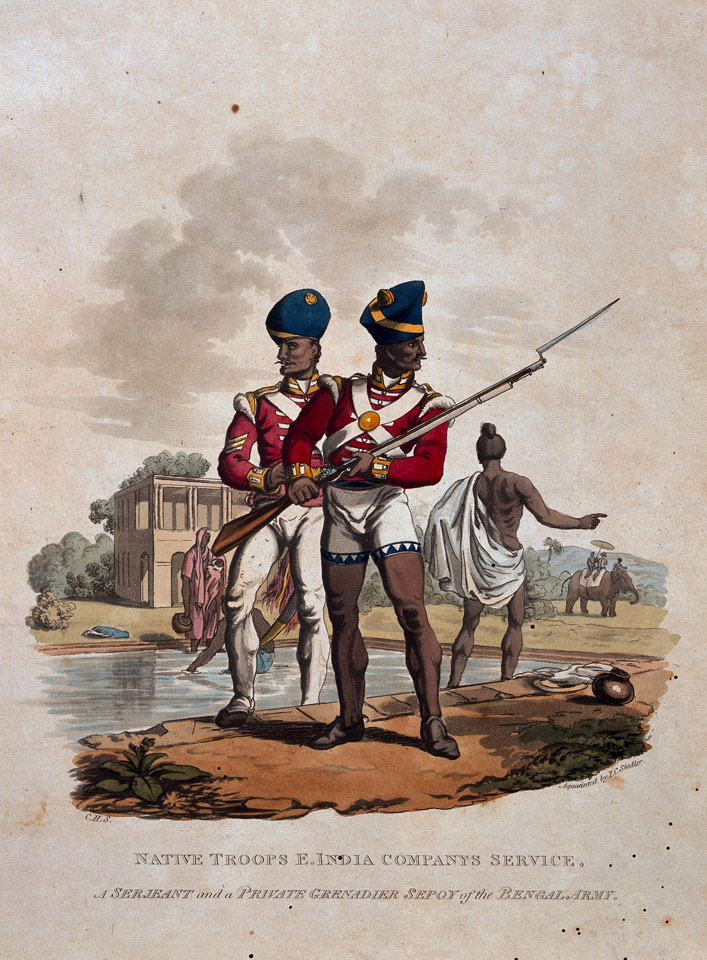
1812 engraving of a havildar and sepoy of a Bengal Native Infantry grenadier company

The 1st Regiment of Bengal Native Infantry was a line infantry regiment of the Bengal Army. Organisationally part of the Bengal Native Infantry, the regiment was raised in Calcutta in 1757 as a battalion-sized unit for service in the Seven Years' War. In 1763 it was named the Galliez Battalion and ranked as the 9th (Galliez) Battalion in the next year. The battalion was officially redesignated as a regiment in 1781 and renamed the 10th Regiment of Bengal Native Infantry, being re-ranked as the 17th Regiment of Bengal Native Infantry in 1784.

In 1786 the regiment was reverted to a battalion and renamed the 17th Battalion of Bengal Native Infantry, being absorbed into the 12th Regiment of Bengal Native Infantry as its second battalion in 1796. The battalion became its own regiment in 1824 as the "1st Regiment of Bengal Native Infantry" and mutinied at Cawnpore during the Indian Rebellion of 1857, resulting in its disbandment.

== Chronology ==
- 1757 formed at Calcutta as the "Lal Pultan" (Red Battalion) ranked as 1st Battalion
- 1763 named Galliez Battalion after Captain Primrose Galliez
- 1764 Patna Mutiny
- 1764 ranked 9th (Galliez) Battalion
- 1765 posted to the 3rd Brigade
- 1775 became 16th Battalion
- 1781 became 10th Regiment of Bengal Native Infantry
- 1784 became 17th Regiment of Bengal Native Infantry
- 1786 became 17th Battalion of Bengal Native Infantry
- 1796 became 2nd Battalion 12th Regiment of Bengal Native Infantry
- 1824 became 1st Regiment of Bengal Native Infantry
- 1857 mutinied at Cawnpore

In 1861, after the mutiny, the title was given to the 21st Regiment of Bengal Native Infantry which later became the 1st Regiment of Brahman Infantry.
