= 62nd Punjabis =

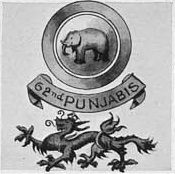
- Active: 1903–1922
- Country: (East India Company) Company-ruled India; British India
- Branch: Madras Army; British Indian Army
- Type: Infantry
- Size: 1 Battalion
- Nickname: Mootoo Naik ki Paltan
- Uniform: Red; faced green
- Engagements: Battle of Wandiwash 1860; Siege of Madura 1763; First Anglo-Mysore War 1767–69; Capture of Pondicherry 1778; Second Anglo-Mysore War 1780–84; Third Anglo-Mysore War 1789–92; Second Mahratta War 1803–06; Travancore War 1809; Third Mahratta War 1817–19; Coorg War 1834; First China War 1839–42; Chin Lushai Expedition 1889–90; First World War 1914–18

Commanders
- Colonel of the Regiment: Field Marshal Sir Claude Auchinleck, GCB, GCIE, CSI, DSO, OBE

The 62nd Punjabis was an infantry regiment of the British Indian Army. It was raised in 1759 as the 3rd Battalion of Coast Sepoys, and formed part of the Madras Army. It was designated as the 62nd Punjabis in 1903 and became 1st Battalion 1st Punjab Regiment in 1922. In 1947, it was allocated to the Pakistan Army, where it continues to exist as 1st battalion, Punjab Regiment. It is the senior-most surviving infantry battalion of the British Indian Army.

== History ==
=== Early history ===
The regiment had its antecedents in the old Madras Army of the British East India Company, which was largely responsible for the British conquest of south and central India. It was raised at Madras in September 1759, as the 3rd Battalion of Coast Sepoys from existing companies of sepoys that had been raised a year earlier. The men were mostly enlisted from South India and consisted of Muslims and Hindus. The regiment was actively engaged in the wars against the French, Mysore and the Marathas. Their first major engagement was the decisive Battle of Wandiwash in 1760, which ended French colonial ambitions in India. This was followed by forty years of constant warfare against the Sultans of Mysore, and then the Marathas chieftains. In the Second Maratha War of 1803–05, the regiment fought in the Battle of Assaye under General Arthur Wellesley, the future Duke of Wellington. Its performance at Assaye was much appreciated and it was permitted to display the word "Assaye" with the device of an elephant on their colours and appointments. It was again engaged against the Marathas during the Third Maratha War of 1817–19, which decisively broke the Maratha power in India. In 1840, the regiment took part in the First Anglo-Chinese War, where it again performed well and as a reward, was authorized to bear a golden dragon wearing the imperial crown upon its regimental colours. In the latter part of the 19th century, the regiment did not see much action, although it saw active service in Burma.

=== 62nd Punjabis ===
In 1902, the regiment, now designated as the 2nd Madras Infantry, was reconstituted with Punjabi Muslims, Sikhs and Rajputs. Next year, as a result of the reforms brought about in the Indian Army by Lord Kitchener, all Madras units had 60 added to their numbers, and the regiment's designation was changed to 62nd Punjabis. During the First World War, the 62nd Punjabis were sent to Egypt as part of the 10th Indian Division to protect the Suez Canal. The regiment played a major role in repulsing the Turkish offensive of 1915. After operating in the British colony of Aden later that year, they arrived in Mesopotamia on 31 December 1915. Here, they were engaged in fierce fighting on the Tigris Front, as the British made desperate efforts to raise the Siege of Kut al Amara, and later, during the British advance northwards. The regiment took part in the Battles of Hanna, Dujaila Redoubt and the Hai Salient. After serving on the Persian frontier for the rest of the war, the regiment returned to India in 1920. It suffered a total of 840 casualties during the war. Captain Claude Auchinleck, later Field Marshal and the last Commander-in-Chief of the British Indian Army, served with the 62nd Punjabis in Egypt and Mesopotamia.

=== Subsequent history ===
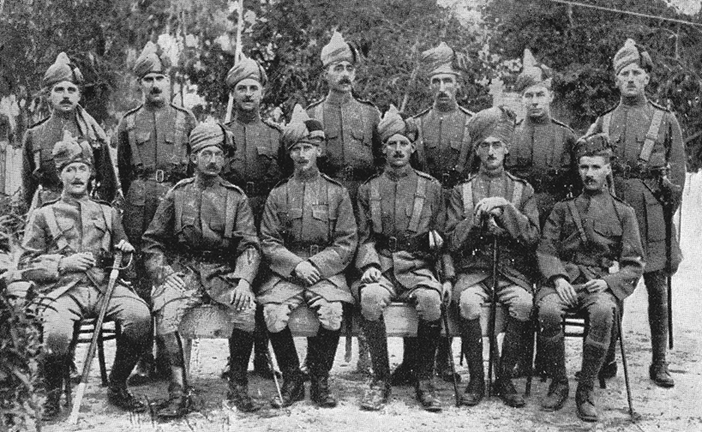
Officers of the 62nd Punjabis, Ismailia, Egypt, 1914. Captain Claude Auchinleck is standing on far right.

After the First World War, the 62nd Punjabis were grouped with the 66th, 76th, 82nd and 84th Punjabis, and the 1st Brahmans to form the 1st Punjab Regiment in 1922. The battalion was redesignated as 1st Battalion 1st Punjab Regiment.

During the Second World War, 1/1st Punjab initially served in Iraq and then moved to North Africa in November 1941 to join the 5th Indian Division, only to take part in the British withdrawal following Rommel's offensive in January 1942. The battalion was converted into motorized infantry and deployed at Ruweisat Ridge, where in July, it took part in halting Rommel's final offensive in North Africa at El Alamein by the Eighth Army led by General Claude Auchinleck. It then participated in the British counter-attack in October, which turned the tide of war in North Africa. In October 1943, 1/1st Punjab arrived in Burma, where it fought in the Second Arakan Campaign and took part in the Reconquest of Burma. It fought in the Battles of Kohima, Tiddim Road and numerous actions in the Irrawaddy Basin until the final Allied victory in August 1945. It then served in the Dutch East Indies as part of the Allied occupation forces.

In 1947, 1/1st Punjab was allocated to Pakistan Army. During the 1948 Kashmir War with India, it served at Chakothi. In 1956, the 1st Punjab Regiment was merged with the 14th, 15th and 16th Punjab Regiments to form one large Punjab Regiment, and 1/1st Punjab was redesignated as 1 Punjab. During the 1965 Indo-Pakistan War, the battalion fought in the Battle of Chawinda, while in the 1971 war, it served in the Rajasthan Sector.

== Lineage ==
- 1759: 3rd Battalion of Coast Sepoys
- 1769: 2nd Carnatic Battalion
- 1784: 2nd Madras Battalion
- 1796: 1st Battalion 2nd Regiment of Madras Native Infantry
- 1824: 2nd Regiment of Madras Native Infantry
- 1885: 2nd Regiment of Madras Infantry
- 1901: 2nd Madras Infantry
- 1903: 62nd Punjabis
- 1922: 1st Battalion 1st Punjab Regiment
- 1956: 1st Battalion The Punjab Regiment

== See also ==
- 1st Punjab Regiment
- Punjab Regiment
