= 49th Regiment of Bengal Native Infantry =

The Bengal Native Infantry was part of the organisation of the East India Company's Bengal Army before the Indian rebellion of 1857.

The infantry regiments underwent frequent changes of numbering during their period of existence. The traditional formation of British and Presidency armies' regiments was by a hierarchy in which the "1st Regiment" was the oldest and the highest number was given to the youngest. In 1764, the Bengal Native Infantry regiments were renumbered in the order of the seniority of their captain.

The vast majority of the Bengal Native Infantry regiments rebelled in the Indian Rebellion of 1857.

== Chronology ==
Notes

Sources

- 1804 raised as 1st Btn 25th Regiment of Bengal Native Infantry following 1796 reorganisation when previous 25th became the 2nd Btn 2nd Regiment
- 1824 1st Battalion became 49th Regiment of Bengal Native Infantry under Major J Tod
- 1857 disarmed at Meean Meer 13 May
