= Revolt of Rajab Ali =

Soldier of the Bengal Regiment

Havildar Rajab Ali Khan
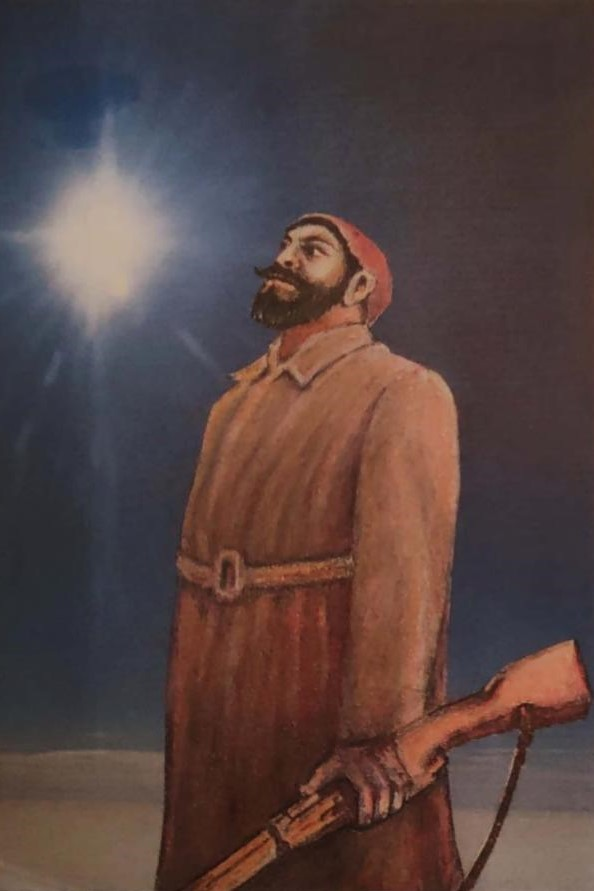
- Idealized portrait of Rajab Ali painted in 1930's
- Born: Sandwip
- Disappeared: 9 January 1858; Karimganj, Sylhet district, North-East Frontier
- Occupation: Military
- Movement: Sepoy Mutiny

Rajab Ali Khan, also known as Havildar Rajab Ali, was a soldier of the Bengal Regiment who defected during the Sepoy Revolt of 1857. He commanded the rebels at Chittagong and was chased by British forces as far as Sylhet and Manipur.

== Description ==
The identity of Havildar Rajab Ali is quite unclear. Many historians and researchers consider him to be a resident of Sandwip, an island off the coast of Chittagong. At a young age, he joined the Bengal Regiment as a sepoy and was later promoted to a 4th Company Havildar. The 34th Regiment of Bengal Native Infantry had 120 havildars only. At that time, he was living at the Parade Ground army camp near Pahartali, which was under the charge of Captain PHK Dewaal.

== Rebellion ==
On 12 November 1857, four hundred sepoys of the 34th Regiment of Bengal Native Infantry called for rebellion against the British East India Company. Among the sepoys of Chittagong, the sepoys of Barrackpore were also present. It is thought that it was the latter who arrived in Chittagong to spread the revolt. The sepoys attacked the armoury and treasury, collecting weapons and equipment. After attacking the British jail, they freed all the prisoners. Rajab Ali Khan commanded the 2nd, 3rd and 4th regiments along with sepoy Jamal Khan. At that time, many officers faced casualties. In panic, the British soldiers took shelter in the ships at sea. Chittagong was independent of British rule for thirty hours. After attacking the barracks, the rebels left Chittagong with elephants, ammunition and other necessary supplies though at one point they did become weak due to lack of supplies.

The rebels decided to take refuge in a safe area of independent Tripura. Havildar Rajab Ali Khan took over the management of the rebel sepoys. A report by Captain PHK Dewaal of the Bengal Regiment quoted local sources as saying that Rajab Ali had crossed the Feni River with the rebel forces towards the Tripura border. But before that, the British commissioner of Chittagong sent a message to the Maharaja of Tripura Ishan Chandra Manikya to repel the rebel sepoys. The king of Tripura joined hands with the British and made preparations to stop the rebels. The rebels reached the gateway of independent Tripura on 2 December via Sitakunda. They saw that many armed soldiers were waiting there to stop them. The rebels were forced to move towards the hilly areas of British Tripura (Comilla), though the army of Tripura chased them.

The rebels then crossed the inaccessible road and reached Sylhet near the British protectorate of Manipur. Major Baing of the Sylhet Light Infantry in the border area attacked the rebels there. In a fierce battle Major Baing was killed and the British forces under him were defeated. Even then the British and the local forces fought side by side. Many people died on their side in a few battles. Survivors of the attack eventually had to seek refuge in the nearby mountains.

== Defeat ==
Finally, on 9 January 1858, Rajab Ali Khan fought his last battle against British forces at Malegarh in Karimganj. His forces had crossed the hills near the Kachari Kingdom and took up position at Sabashpur near Mohanpur Tea Garden. The British forces were notified of this through the local zamindars and launched a surprise attack led by Lieutenant Ross. Rajab Ali Khan fought with a small number of his troops but was defeated in the face of heavy casualties. 70 sepoys were killed in the battle and many more were injured. Along with Rajab Ali Khan, three or four survived by the end of the battle. In the face of continued pursuit by British forces, they went into hiding hid in the deep hilly forests near Manipur. The final report of the British forces said that they could not be found. Havildar Rajab Ali Khan's life came to an end in the public eye.
