= 18th Regiment of Bengal Native Infantry =

Regiment of Bengal

The 18th Regiment of the Bengal Native Infantry was a unit of the Bengal Native Infantry that was formed in 1776, then mutinied in 1857 and was disbanded.

== Chronology ==
- 1776 raised for the Vizier of Oude
- 1777 incorporated in HEIC service as the 23rd Battalion of Bengal Native Infantry
- 1781 became the 16th Regiment of Bengal Native Infantry
- 1784 became the 16th Regiment of Bengal Native Infantry
- 1786 became the 20th Battalion of Bengal Native Infantry
- 1796 became the 2nd Battalion 6th Regiment of Bengal Native Infantry
- 1824 became the 18th Regiment of Bengal Native Infantry
- 1857 mutinied at Bareilly 31 May

In 1861, after the mutiny, the title was given to the Alipore Regiment which later became the 18th Infantry.
