= Sarbjit Singh Kalha =

British Indian military officer

Lieutenant Colonel Sarbjit Singh Kalha DSO
- Born: 1914-15; Nawanpind, Gurdaspur district, Punjab Province, British India
- Died: 11 January 1946; Surabaya, Java, Dutch East Indies
- Alma mater: Khalsa College, Amritsar; Indian Military Academy; Staff College, Camberley
- Military career
- Allegiance: British India
- Branch: British Indian Army
- Service years: 1936-1946
- Service number: IO.66
- Units: Argyll and Sutherland Highlanders; 2/1Punjab Regiment
- Commands: 2/1Punjab Regiment
- Conflicts: Waziristan Campaign; World War II; Burma campaign; British Occupation of the Dutch East Indies (1945-46)
- Awards: Distinguished Service Order

Lieutenant Colonel Sarbjit Singh Kalha, DSO (1914 or 1915 - 11 January 1946) was an officer of the British Indian Army, who saw action in the Burma Campaign during World War II, and later in the British Occupation of the Dutch East Indies. He was the first Sikh officer to be awarded the Distinguished Service Order (DSO), the first Sikh officer to attend the Staff College, Camberley, and the first Indian officer to lead a battalion of the 1st Punjab Regiment.

== Personal life ==
Kalha hailed from Nawanpind, district Gurdaspur, Punjab Province, British India. His father, Rai Sahib Sunder Singh, was an executive engineer in the Burma Railways, and had supervised the laying down of the first railway line from Maungdaw to Buthitdaung. Three of Sarbjit Kalha's brother also served in the British Indian Army.

Kalha graduated from the Khalsa College, Amritsar. His wife was Mrs. Sarbjit Singh Kalha from Sarguja, Central Provinces, British India.

== Military career ==
Kalha was commissioned in 1935 at the Indian Military Academy, Dehradun. His service number was IO. 66. He gained his first combat experience in the 1936-37 Waziristan Operations. He was posted to the 2nd battalion of the 1st Punjab Regiment, after serving a year with the Argyll and Sutherland Highlanders.

=== World War II ===
Kalha then served in the Burma Campaign of World War II. In 1944, Kalha became the first Indian officer to command a battalion of the 1st Punjab Regiment. His battalion, the 2/1 Punjab Regiment, was a part of the 5th Indian Division in Burma.

In 1944, while holding the rank of a Major, Kalha was awarded the DSO for his actions in the Battle of the Ngakyedauk Pass in Arakan, during the Burma Campaign. His 'skilful planning and bold execution' against the Japanese, for which he won the DSO, opened up the Ngakyedauk Pass to the besieged 7th Indian Infantry Division. His DSO was announced in the London Gazette on 22 June 1944. A short clip of him just after receiving his DSO from King George VI is available from British Pathe. He was the first Sikh officer in the British Indian Army to be awarded the DSO.

In May 1944, Kalha became the first Sikh Officer to attend the Staff College at Camberley. He returned to India in January 1945.

=== Post-war ===
Kalha again became the commanding officer of 2/1st Punjab Regiment in August 1945. With this unit, he went to Singapore as part of the 123rd Brigade of the 5th Indian Division, which led the reoccupation of Singapore by the British. He then got posted in the British Occupation of the Dutch East Indies (1945–46).

==== Death ====
On 11 January 1946, Lt. Col. Kalha was killed in an ambush on a convoy he was moving in through Soerabaja/Surabaya in Java, Dutch East Indies.
