= 84th Punjabis =

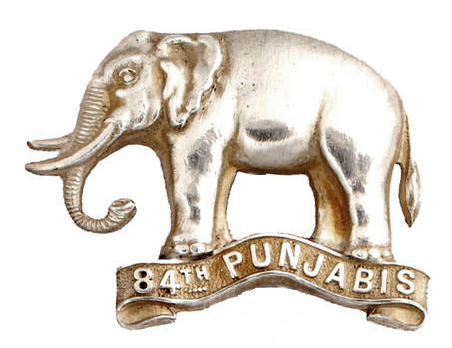
- Active: 1903–1922
- Country: British India
- Branch: British Indian Army
- Type: Infantry
- Size: 1 Battalion
- Nickname: Macdonald ki Paltan
- Uniform: Red; faced green
- Engagements: Fourth Mysore War 1798–99; Second Mahratta War 1803–06; Bourbon Island 1810; Mauritius 1810; Third Mahratta War 1817–19; Coorg War 1834; Upper Burma 1889–93; First World War 1914–18

The 84th Punjabis was an infantry regiment of the British Indian Army. It was raised by Captain Donald Macdonald at Vellore on 12 August 1794, as the 34th Battalion of Madras Native Infantry. It was designated as the 84th Punjabis in 1903 and became the 10th (Training) Battalion, 1st Punjab Regiment in 1922. In 1943, it was converted into the 1st Punjab Regimental Centre. In 1947, the 1st Punjab Regiment was allocated to the Pakistan Army. In 1956, the 1st, 14th, 15th and 16th Punjab Regimental Centres where amalgamated to form the Punjab Regimental Centre.

== Early history ==
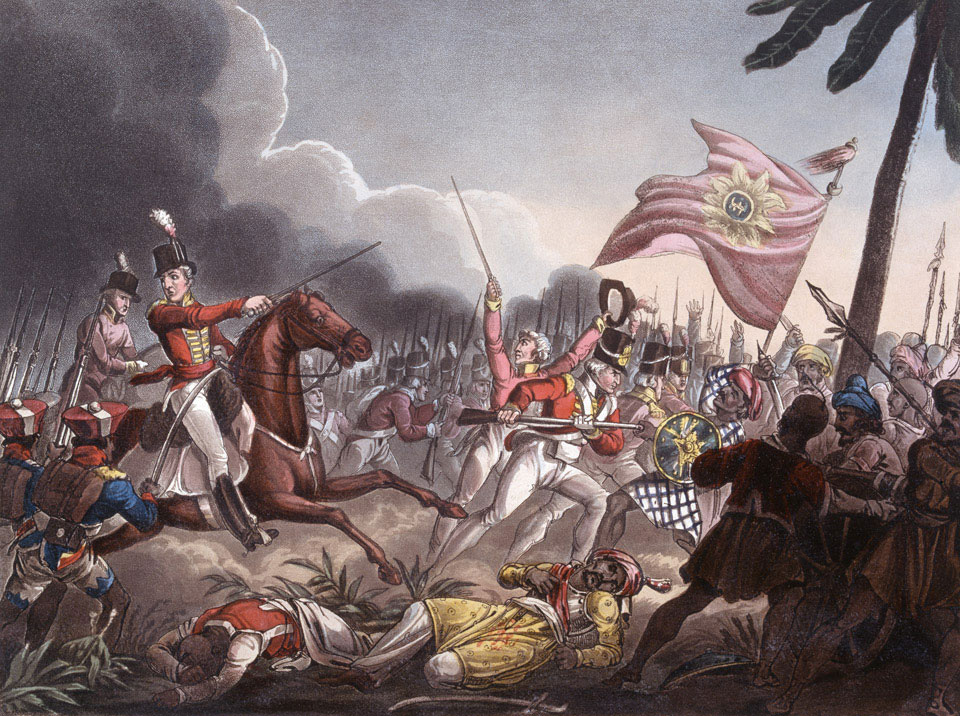
The regiment (left) at the Battle of Assaye

The regiment had its antecedents in the Madras Army of the East India Company, which was largely responsible for the British conquest of south and central India. It was raised at Vellore in August 1794, as the 34th Madras Battalion. The regiment's first action was during the Fourth Anglo-Mysore War near Mallavelly on 27 March 1799. On 4 May, it fought in the Battle of Seringapatam, where Tipu Sultan made his last stand. The regiment's next major action was in the Second Anglo-Maratha War, where it fought in the Battle of Assaye on 3 September 1803, under General Arthur Wellesley, the future Duke of Wellington. The regiment's performance was much appreciated during the day's fierce fighting, where it suffered 228 casualties. As a reward, it was permitted to display the word "Assaye" with the device of an elephant on their colours and appointments. In 1810, it took part in the expeditions to Bourbon Island and Mauritius in the Indian Ocean. It was again engaged against the Marathas during the Third Maratha War of 1817–19, which decisively broke the Maratha power in India. In the latter part of the 19th century, the regiment did not see much action, although it saw active service in Burma.

== 84th Punjabis ==
In 1902, the regiment, now designated as the 24th Madras Infantry, was reconstituted with Punjabi Muslims, Sikhs and Jats. Next year, as a result of the reforms brought about in the Indian Army by Lord Kitchener, all Madras units had 60 added to their numbers, and the regiment's designation was changed to 84th Punjabis. During the first three years of the First World War, the 84th Punjabis remained deployed on the North West Frontier of India. In March 1917, they were dispatched to Mesopotamia, where it operated on the Euphrates Line. By now, the Turkish Army in Mesopotamia had been largely defeated and the regiment did not see any significant fighting. In November 1918, it moved to Salonika in Greece and then six weeks later to the Russian Transcaucasia in support of the White Russian forces fighting the Bolsheviks. After spending 1919–20 in Turkey as part of the Allied occupation forces, it returned home in October 1920.

== Subsequent history ==
After the First World War, the 84th Punjabis were grouped with the 62nd, 66th, 76th and 82nd Punjabis, and the 1st Brahmans to form the 1st Punjab Regiment in 1922. The battalion was redesignated as 10th Battalion, 1st Punjab Regiment and became the Training Battalion of the regiment, based at Jhelum. During the Second World War, 10/1st Punjab was converted into the 1st Punjab Regimental Centre. In 1947, the 1st Punjab Regiment was allocated to Pakistan Army, and in 1956, it was merged with the 14th, 15th and 16th Punjab Regiments to form one large Punjab Regiment. The 1st Punjab Regimental Centre was merged with the 14th, 15th and 16th Punjab Regimental Centres to form the Punjab Regimental Centre. It is based at Mardan.

== Lineage ==
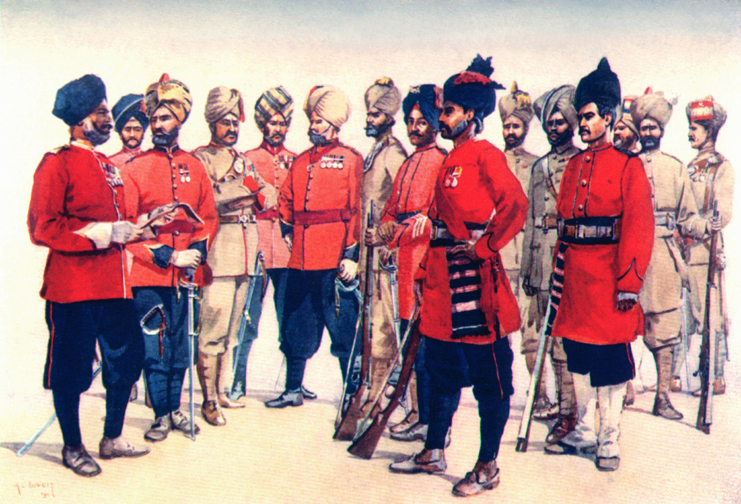
"Punjab Regiments." Watercolour by Alfred Crowdy Lovett, 1910. Sepoy 84th Punjabis fourth from right.

- 1794: 34th Battalion of Madras Native Infantry
- 1797: 2nd Battalion 12th Regiment of Madras Native Infantry
- 1824: 24th Regiment of Madras Native Infantry
- 1885: 24th Regiment of Madras Infantry
- 1901: 24th Madras Infantry
- 1903: 84th Punjabis
- 1922: 10th (Training) Battalion 1st Punjab Regiment
- 1942: 10/1st Punjab Regimental Training Centre
- 1943: 1st Punjab Regimental Centre
- 1956: Punjab Regimental Centre

== See also ==
- 1st Punjab Regiment
- Punjab Regiment
