= Mahton =

Indian caste

Mahton is a caste in India. According to W. H. McLeod, they are small in number and found mostly in the Doaba region, where some have converted to Sikhism. Although they claim to have descended from Rajputs, this belief is disputed by other communities.
