= 5th Light Infantry =

- Active: 1803–1922
- Country: Indian Empire
- Branch: Army
- Type: Infantry (Indian)
- Part of: Bengal Army (to 1895); Bengal Command
- Uniform: Red; faced yellow
- Engagements: Arracan; 1838 – 42 Afghanistan; Kandahar; Ghaznee; 1842 Cabul; Moodhee; Ferozeshah; Sobraon; 1878 – 80 Afghanistan; 1885 – 87 Burma

Commanders
- Coleridgeonel-in-Chief: King Edward VII (1904)

The 5th Light Infantry was an infantry regiment of the Bengal Army and later of the raj-period British Indian Army. It could trace its lineage back to 1803, when it was raised as the 2nd Battalion, 21st Bengal Native Infantry. The regiment was known by a number of different names: the 42nd Bengal Native Infantry 1824–1842, the 42nd Bengal Native (Light) Infantry 1842–1861, the 5th Bengal Native (Light) Infantry 1861–1885 and the 5th Bengal (Light) Infantry 1885–1903. Its final designation 5th Light Infantry was a result of the Kitchener Reforms of the Indian Army, when all the old presidency titles (Bengal) were removed. During World War I the regiment was stationed in Singapore and became notorious for its involvement in the 1915 Singapore Mutiny. The regiment was disbanded in 1922, after another set of reforms of the post World War I Indian Army.

== History ==
=== Early history ===
First raised in 1803, the regiment was awarded the distinction of becoming light infantry in 1843.

As the 42nd Bengal Native (Light) Infantry the regiment carried as battle honours "Arakan, Afghanistan and Kandahar 1842", "Ghunze 1842", and "Kabul and Moodkee, Ferozeshah and Sobroan 1857". The 42nd BNI was one of only twelve infantry regiments of the old Bengal Army to remain fully loyal to the British East India Company and to escape mutiny or disbandment during the Indian Mutiny of 1857–58. It was then renumbered as the 5th Bengal Native (Light) Infantry.

As noted above the regimental title underwent several subsequent changes until it became the 5th Light Infantry in 1903. Throughout its history the 5th LI was known to its Indian soldiers as "Jansen-ki-Paltan" or Johnson's Regiment after its first commander (Captain Jeremiah). After serving in the Second Afghan War of 1879–80 and the Third Burmese War of 1885–87, the regiment saw only garrison duty until World War I. In 1914 the regiment was stationed at Nowgong in the Central Provinces. From there they were posted to Singapore in October to replace a British battalion. The regimental centre was at Benares and for enlistment and training purposes the 5th LI was linked with the 17th Infantry and the 18th Infantry.

Unusually for Indian Army regiments of the period, the 5th Light Infantry was an entirely Muslim unit. The regiment comprised Ranghars (Muslims of Rajput origin) making up the Right Wing, and Pathans making up the Left Wing. Numbering 800 men at full strength, the regiment was commanded by both British and Indian officers.

=== Singapore Mutiny ===
Following the entry of Turkey into the War in October 1914 the loyalty of the Muslim troops who made up a large proportion of the Indian Army came under some strain. In most regiments this did not cause major problems. However the 5th Light Infantry had, since its arrival in Singapore, been plagued by internal discord and there were intelligence reports that agents of the Indian revolutionary group Ghadr were trying to foment rebellion amongst Muslim soldiers from Bengal, Delhi and UP areas. Also, Colonel Martin, newly promoted to command, was unpopular with his officers and there was further discord between factions amongst the sepoys focusing on issues of promotion, pay and other conditions of service. Garrison duties in Singapore included guarding German internees who attempted with some success to persuade the Indian soldiers that Britain was losing the War. Some of the sepoys attended a mosque where the resident local Maulvi preached that Turkey was the seat of the Khalifa of Islam and that no Muslim should fight against him. Finally, in mid-February 1915 the regiment received orders to embark for further garrison duty in Hong Kong. With poor communication between British officers and sepoys, and morale already low, the rumour that they were being sent to fight the Turks spread amongst the sepoys.

On 15 February while final preparations were being made for departure, mutiny broke out amongst four companies of the eight comprising the 5th LI. During the hours that followed 39 British, local soldiers and civilians were killed by the mutineers, including two officers of the regiment. About half of the Indian personnel of the regiment did not take part in the mutiny but scattered in confusion and could not be brought to act against their fellow sepoys. Sepoys who rallied to their officers at Colonel Martin's bungalow overlooking the barracks, were registered and ordered to disperse "to a safe place" to avoid nighttime confusion between mutineers and loyalists.

On the 17 and 18 February local volunteer units together with sailors and marines from Russian, Japanese and French warships operating near Singapore moved to disperse the mutineers, who after the first day of violence had broken up into small groups seeking to escape from Singapore. The Sultan of Johore provided units of the Johore Military Forces to round up mutineers who had escaped to the Malaya mainland.

Following suppression of the mutiny, more than two hundred men were brought to court martial. Forty-seven mutineers were executed, some in public. Amongst those shot by firing squad were two Indian officers accused of leading the mutiny. A further 184 sepoys were sentenced to terms of imprisonment of up to life. Colonel Martin was the subject of severe criticism by a subsequent court of inquiry and retired from the Army.

=== Post mutiny ===
On 3 July 1915 the remnants of the 5th LI – seven British and Indian officers and 588 other ranks – sailed from Singapore to West Africa where they arrived in time to see active service in the German Cameroons. Following the German surrender the regiment was transferred to German East Africa (modern Tanzania) where it saw further action in the Lindi area. In 1917 the 5th LI was moved to Aden, then under threat by Turkish forces. Finally it returned to its cantonments in India during 1918. Following the departure of the regiment from Singapore members of the Ahir community were recruited to replace the Ranghars who had formerly comprised the Right Wing. A second wartime battalion was raised but spent the war in India, providing drafts for the overseas 1st Battalion, before being disbanded in 1919.

In spite of its credible performance in Africa during 1915–17, the 5th Light Infantry was amongst those regiments disbanded after the war as part of a general restructuring of the Indian Army. The date of disbandment for the 5th LI was 12 January 1922.

== Campaigns ==
- First Afghan War
- Second Afghan War
- Third Anglo-Burmese War
- World War I

== See also ==
- Sumner, Ian (2001). The Indian Army 1914–1947. Osprey Publishing. ISBN 1-84176-196-6.
