= Ram Sarup Singh =

- Victoria Cross Medal
- Born: 12 April 1919; Kheri, Mahender Gar district, Haryana, India
- Died: 25 October 1944 (aged 25); Kennedy Peak, British Burma
- Military career
- Allegiance: British India
- Branch: British Indian Army
- Rank: Acting Subadar
- Units: 1st Punjab Regiment
- Conflicts: World War II; Pacific War; Burma campaign; Burma campaign (1944–1945) (DOW)
- Awards: Victoria Cross

Ram Sarup Singh VC (12 April 1919 – 25 October 1944) was an Indian recipient of the Victoria Cross, the highest and most prestigious award for gallantry in the face of the enemy that can be awarded to British and Commonwealth forces.

== Details ==
He was 25 years old, born in a Rajput Tunwar family at Village Kheri Talwana, Mahendergarh and a Jemadar (acting Subadar) in the 2nd Battalion, 1st Punjab Regiment, in the British Indian Army when the following deed took place for which he was awarded the VC.

On 25 October 1944 at Kennedy Peak in the Tiddim area, Burma (now Myanmar), two platoons were ordered to attack a strong Japanese position. The platoon commanded by Subadar Singh attained its objective and although Singh was wounded in both legs he insisted on carrying on. Later, the enemy's counter-attack was halted by Subadar Singh's dashing counter-charge in which he killed four of the enemy himself. He was again wounded, but continued to lead his men, killing two more of the enemy, before he was mortally wounded.

The citation reads:

In Burma on the 25th October, 1944, two platoons of the 1st Punjab Regiment were ordered to put in a diversionary attack on the flank of an enemy position. This feature was of exceptional natural strength and was defended by a large force of fresh Japanese troops who had turned the hill into a fortress. Every approach was covered by medium and light machine guns sited in bunkers. The platoon of Subadar Ram Sarup Singh at once charged the position with another section. This instantaneous action completely bewildered the enemy, who fled from the bunkered positions suffering casualties in their retreat. The Subadar was wounded in the legs but took no notice of his wounds. While he was consolidating his position, the enemy opened heavy fire with grenade dischargers, and at the same time put in a strong counter-attack in three waves of twenty each from a flank. It seemed that the platoon must be overwhelmed, but Subadar Ram Sarup Singh got another light machine gun into position and led a charge against the advancing enemy, bayonetting four himself, and checking them. Although badly wounded in the thigh, he got up and, ignoring his wound, again went for the enemy shouting encouragement to his men. He bayonetted another Japanese and shot a further one, but was mortally wounded by a burst of medium machine gun fire in the chest and neck.

It would be difficult to find a finer example of cool bravery, cheerfulness, leadership and determination. His action had a profound effect on the rest of the Company, and when volunteers were called for to bring in his body, under the heaviest fire, the entire Company volunteered.

Subadar Ram Sarup Singh's gallantry will inspire the Regiment for all time.

— London Gazette, 8 February 1945

His medals now form part of the Lord Ashcroft VC collection in the Imperial War Museum in London.

== Awards and decorations ==

Victoria Cross	1939–1945 Star	Burma Star	War Medal 1939–1945
