= Bengal Native Infantry =

Component of the Bengal Army in British India

- Flag of the British East India Company
- Active: 1757–1858 (as part of the East India Company's Bengal Army); 1858–1895 (as part of the Bengal Army of the British Raj); 1895–1903 (under the Bengal command of the British Indian Army)
- Allegiance: East India Company; United Kingdom
- Branch: Bengal Army
- Role: Infantry
- Size: 19 Battalions (1764); 74 Regiments (1857); 45 Regiments (1861)
- Conflicts: Battle of Plassey; Third Carnatic War; First Anglo-Mysore War; Second Anglo-Mysore War; Third Anglo-Mysore War; First Anglo-Maratha War; Cotiote War; Fourth Anglo-Mysore War; Second Anglo-Maratha War; Invasion of Java; Anglo-Nepalese War; Third Anglo-Maratha War; First Anglo-Burmese War; First Opium War; First Anglo-Afghan War; First Anglo-Sikh War; Second Anglo-Sikh War; Second Anglo-Burmese War; Indian Mutiny; Second Opium War; Second Anglo-Afghan War; Suakin Expedition; Third Anglo-Burmese War

The regiments of Bengal Native Infantry, alongside the regiments of Bengal European Infantry, were the regular infantry components of the East India Company's Bengal Army from the raising of the first Native battalion in 1757 to the passing into law of the Government of India Act 1858 (as a direct result of the Indian Mutiny). At this latter point control of the East India Company's Bengal Presidency passed to the British Government. The first locally recruited battalion was raised by the East India Company in 1757 and by the start of 1857 there were 74 regiments of Bengal Native Infantry in the Bengal Army. Following the Mutiny the Presidency armies came under the direct control of the United Kingdom Government and there was a widespread reorganisation of the Bengal Army that saw the Bengal Native Infantry regiments reduced to 45.

The title "Bengal Native Infantry" fell out of use in 1885 and the Bengal Infantry regiments ceased to exist when the three separate Presidency armies were absorbed into the British Indian Army in 1903. There are units currently serving in the armies of India, Pakistan and the United Kingdom who can trace their lineage directly to units of the Bengal Native Infantry, for example the Jat Regiment in the Indian Army, the Royal Gurkha Rifles in the British Army and 6th Battalion, The Punjab Regiment in the Army of Pakistan.

== Numbering of regiments, unit designations and nomenclature ==
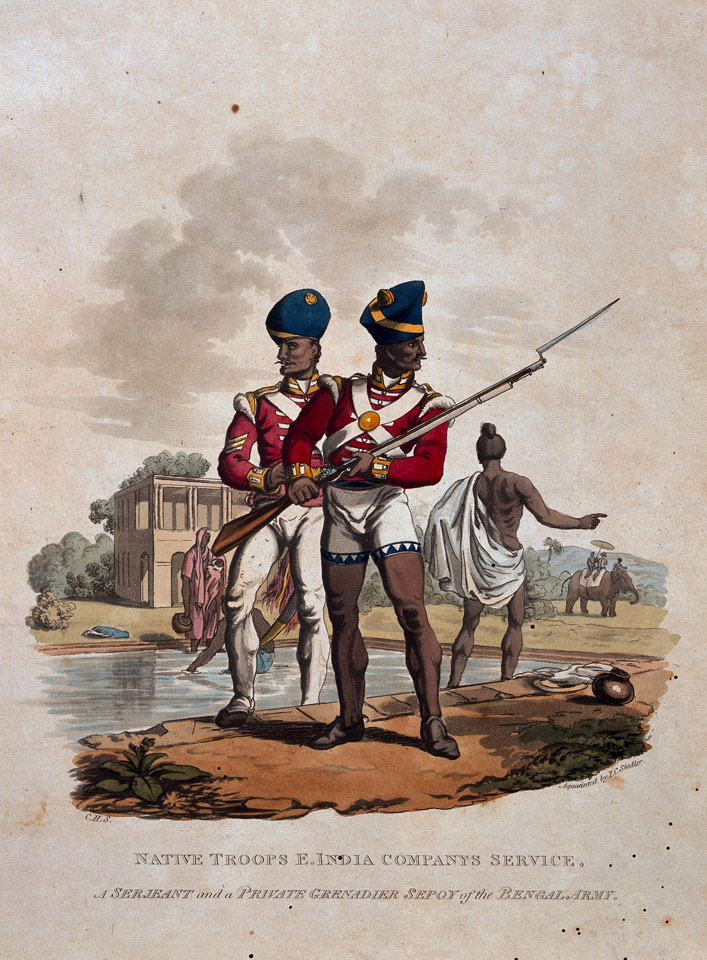
1812 engraving of a havildar and sepoy of a Bengal Native Infantry grenadier company

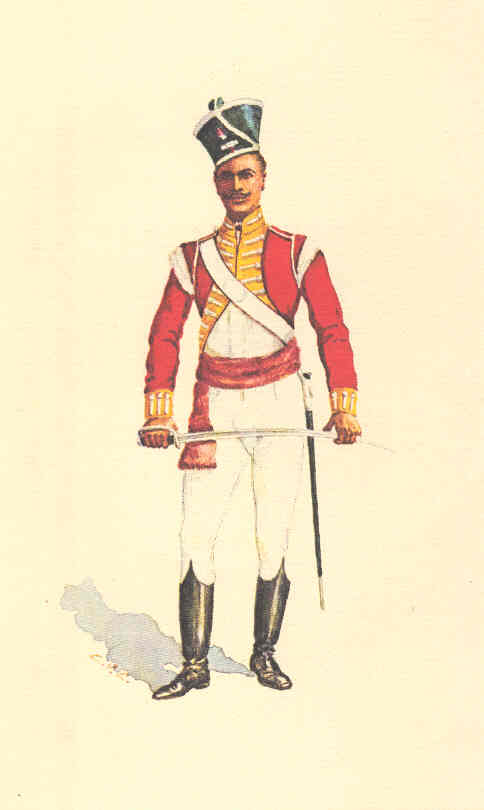
A 21st Bengal Native Infantry subadar in 1819

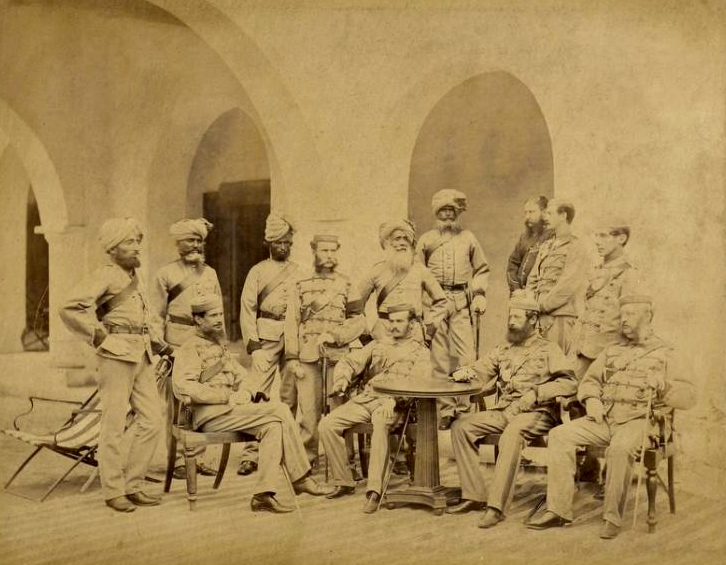
A group photograph of 21st (Punjab) Regiment of Bengal Native Infantry, 1866

The first locally recruited unit of the East India Company's forces in Bengal, raised in 1757 and present at the Battle of Plassey, was known as the Galliez Battalion (named after one of its first Captains) and called the Lal Pultan (Red Battalion) by its locally recruited members. The Bengal Native Infantry regiments underwent frequent changes of numbering during their existence, with the numbers assigned following a reorganisation bearing little or no connection to the regiments that held the pre-existing numbers. The traditional formation of British and Presidency armies' regiments was by a hierarchy in which the "1st Regiment" was the oldest and the highest number was given to the youngest. In 1764 however, the Bengal Native Infantry regiments were renumbered in the order of the individual seniority of their commanding officers. The regiments were reorganised and renumbered (or renamed) twice in 1861, in 1864, again in 1885 and finally in 1903 the Bengal Army was absorbed into the British Indian Army and the Bengal Infantry ceased to exist.

The inclusion of the word "Native" in the titles of the Bengal Native Infantry regiments and throughout the Bengal, Bombay and Madras Armies indicated that the troops were locally recruited in India (or neighbouring areas), in contrast with the Bengal European Infantry which recruited personnel in the United Kingdom. In 1885, the word "Native" was dropped from the titles of all military units in the Bengal Army.

== Recruitment and demographics ==
The 1st Brahmans was the first infantry regiment of the British Indian Army. It was raised at Oudh by Captain T Naylor in 1776

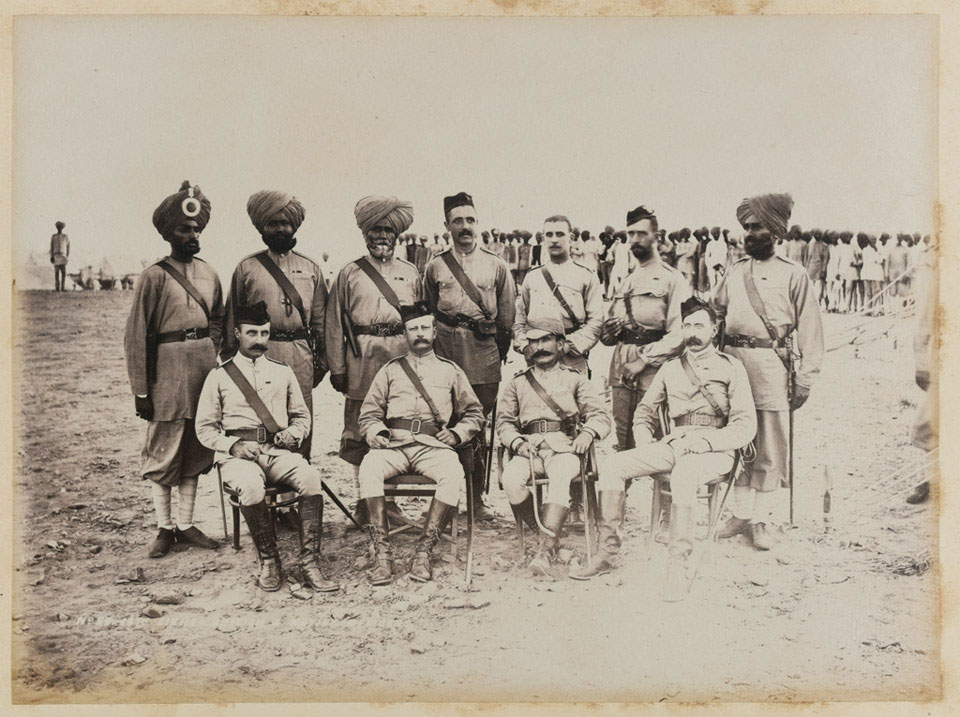
British and native officers, 15th (Ludhiana) Regiment of Bengal Native infantry. Photograph taken by the Royal Engineers during the 1884 Suakin Expedition

The Bengal army mostly recruited upper-caste elements like Kanyakubja Brahmins, Rajputs, from Awadh.

Bengal Native Infantry regiments typically consisted of 800 privates (sepoys), 120 non-commissioned officers (havildars and naiks), 20 native commissioned officers (subedars and jemadars), 2 British sergeants and 26 British commissioned officers. Regiments were commanded by a lieutenant-colonel and were divided into 10 companies, each assigned 2 British officers and 2 native officers. Each regiment was assigned an adjutant, an interpreter and a quartermaster. The majority of recruits for the Bengal Native Infantry in the years leading up to the Mutiny were from the districts of Bengal, Oudh (Awadh) and the surrounding areas – around three quarters of the total numbers.

Mutinying regiments officially ceased to exist following the Mutiny and in 1861 the twelve surviving Bengal Native Infantry regiments (units that did not mutiny, units that were disarmed and later considered to be free of mutineers or units that were disbanded peacefully & were later reformed) were joined by a mix of hastily raised units (for example, the Allahabad Levy became the 33rd Bengal Native Infantry) or newly created units from the Punjab (for example, the 7th Regiment of Punjab Infantry became the 19th Bengal Native Infantry). In addition, soldiers who did not mutiny when the rest of their regiment did so joined units such as The Lucknow Regiment or The Loyal Purbiah Regiment.

== Pre-1857 list of Bengal Native Infantry Regiments ==
Pre-1857 list of Bengal Native Infantry Regiments
Pre-1857 full regiment title.	Status after the Mutiny.
1st Regiment of Bengal Native Infantry	Mutinied at Cawnpore
2nd (Grenadiers) Regiment of Bengal Native Infantry	Disarmed at Barrackpore
3rd Regiment of Bengal Native Infantry	Mutinied at Phillour – loyal portion joined The Loyal Purbiah Regiment
4th Regiment of Bengal Native Infantry	Disarmed at Kangra and Noorpore
5th Regiment of Bengal Native Infantry	Mutinied at Umballah
6th Regiment of Bengal Native Infantry	Mutinied at Allahabad and Futtehpore
7th Regiment of Bengal Native Infantry	Mutinied at Dinapore
8th Regiment of Bengal Native Infantry	Mutinied at Dinapore
9th Regiment of Bengal Native Infantry	Mutinied at Allygurh, Boolunshuhur, Etawah and Mynpoorie
10th Regiment of Bengal Native Infantry	Mutinied at Futtehgurh
11th Regiment of Bengal Native Infantry	Mutinied at Meerut
12th Regiment of Bengal Native Infantry	Mutinied at Jhansi and Nowgong
13th Regiment of Bengal Native Infantry	Mutinied at Lucknow
14th Regiment of Bengal Native Infantry	Mutinied at Jhelum
15th Regiment of Bengal Native Infantry	Mutinied at Nusseerabad
16th (Grenadiers) Regiment of Bengal Native Infantry	Disarmed at Goojerat and Lahore
17th Regiment of Bengal Native Infantry	Mutinied at Azimghur
18th Regiment of Bengal Native Infantry	Mutinied at Bareilly
19th Regiment of Bengal Native Infantry	Disbanded at Barrackpore
20th Regiment of Bengal Native Infantry	Mutinied at Meerut
21st Regiment of Bengal Native Infantry	Did not mutiny – became 1st Bengal Native Infantry
22nd Regiment of Bengal Native Infantry	Mutinied at Fyzabad and Oude
23rd Regiment of Bengal Native Infantry	Mutinied at Mhow
24th Regiment of Bengal Native Infantry	Disarmed at Peshawur
25th Regiment of Bengal Native Infantry (Volunteers)	Disarmed at Benares
26th Regiment of Bengal Native (Light) Infantry	Mutinied at Lahore
27th Regiment of Bengal Native Infantry	Disarmed at Peshawur
28th Regiment of Bengal Native Infantry	Mutinied at Shahjehanpore
29th Regiment of Bengal Native Infantry	Mutinied at Moradabad
30th Regiment of Bengal Native Infantry	Mutinied at Ajmer, Jeypore and Nusseerabad
31st Regiment of Bengal Native (Light) Infantry	Did not mutiny – became 2nd Bengal Native Light Infantry
32nd Regiment of Bengal Native Infantry	Mutinied at Deogurh – loyal portion became 3rd Bengal Native Infantry
33rd Regiment of Bengal Native Infantry	Disarmed at Phillour – loyal portion became 4th Bengal Native Infantry
34th Regiment of Bengal Native Infantry	Disbanded at Barrackpore
35th Regiment of Bengal Native (Light) Infantry	Disarmed at Phillour
36th Regiment of Bengal Native Infantry (Bengal Volunteers)	Mutinied at Jullundur – loyal portion joined The Loyal Purbiah Regiment
37th Regiment of Bengal Native Infantry (Bengal Volunteers)	Mutinied at Benares
38th Regiment of Bengal Native Light Infantry (Bengal Volunteers)	Mutinied at Delhi
39th Regiment of Bengal Native Infantry (Bengal Volunteers)	Disarmed at Dera Ishmael Khan
40th Regiment of Bengal Native Infantry (Volunteers)	Mutinied at Dinapore
41st Regiment of Bengal Native Infantry	Mutinied at Seetapore
42nd Regiment of Bengal Native (Light) Infantry	Mutinied at Saugor – loyal portion formed 5th Bengal Native (Light) Infantry
43rd Regiment of Bengal Native (Light) Infantry	Disarmed at Barrackpore – loyal portion formed 6th Bengal Native (Light) Infantry
44th Regiment of Bengal Native Infantry	Disarmed and dispersed at Agra and Muttra
45th Regiment of Bengal Native Infantry	Mutinied at Ferozepore
46th Regiment of Bengal Native Infantry	Mutinied at Sealkote
47th Regiment of Bengal Native Infantry (Volunteers)	Disarmed at Mirzapore – loyal portion formed the 7th Bengal Native Infantry
48th Regiment of Bengal Native Infantry	Mutinied at Lucknow
49th Regiment of Bengal Native Infantry	Disarmed at Lahore
50th Regiment of Bengal Native Infantry	Mutinied at Nagode
51st Regiment of Bengal Native Infantry	Mutinied at Peshawur
52nd Regiment of Bengal Native Infantry	Mutinied at Jubbulpore
53rd Regiment of Bengal Native Infantry	Mutinied at Cawnpore and Oorie
54th Regiment of Bengal Native Infantry	Mutinied at Delhi
55th Regiment of Bengal Native Infantry	Mutinied at Nowshera
56th Regiment of Bengal Native Infantry	Mutinied at Banda and Cawnpore
57th Regiment of Bengal Native Infantry	Mutinied at Ferozepore
58th Regiment of Bengal Native Infantry	Disarmed at Rawul Pindee
59th Regiment of Bengal Native Infantry	Disarmed at Umritsur – loyal portion formed 8th Bengal Native Infantry
60th Regiment of Bengal Native Infantry	Mutinied at Rohtuck
61st Regiment of Bengal Native Infantry	Mutinied at Jullundur – loyal portion joined The Loyal Purbiah Regiment
62nd Regiment of Bengal Native Infantry	Mutinied at Mooltan
63rd Regiment of Bengal Native Infantry	Disarmed at Berhampore – loyal portion formed 9th Bengal Native Infantry
64th Regiment of Bengal Native Infantry	Disarmed at Barrah, Fort Mackeson and Peshawur
65th Regiment of Bengal Native Infantry (Volunteers)	Disarmed at Ghazeepore – loyal portion formed 10th Bengal Native Infantry
66th (Goorkha) Regiment of Bengal Native Infantry	Did not mutiny – became 1st Goorkha Regiment
67th Regiment of Bengal Native Infantry (Volunteers)	Disarmed and dispersed at Agra and Muttra
68th Regiment of Bengal Native Infantry (Volunteers)	Mutinied at Bareilly
69th Regiment of Bengal Native Infantry	Disarmed at Mooltan
70th Regiment of Bengal Native Infantry	Disarmed at Barrackpore – loyal portion formed 11th Bengal Native Infantry
71st Regiment of Bengal Native Infantry	Mutinied at Lucknow
72nd Regiment of Bengal Native Infantry	raised in 1825 as 4th Extra Regiment. In 1857 mutinied at Neemuch. Disbanded
73rd Regiment of Bengal Native Infantry	Mutinied at Dacca
74th Regiment of Bengal Native Infantry	Mutinied at Delhi

== The Mutiny and its aftermath ==
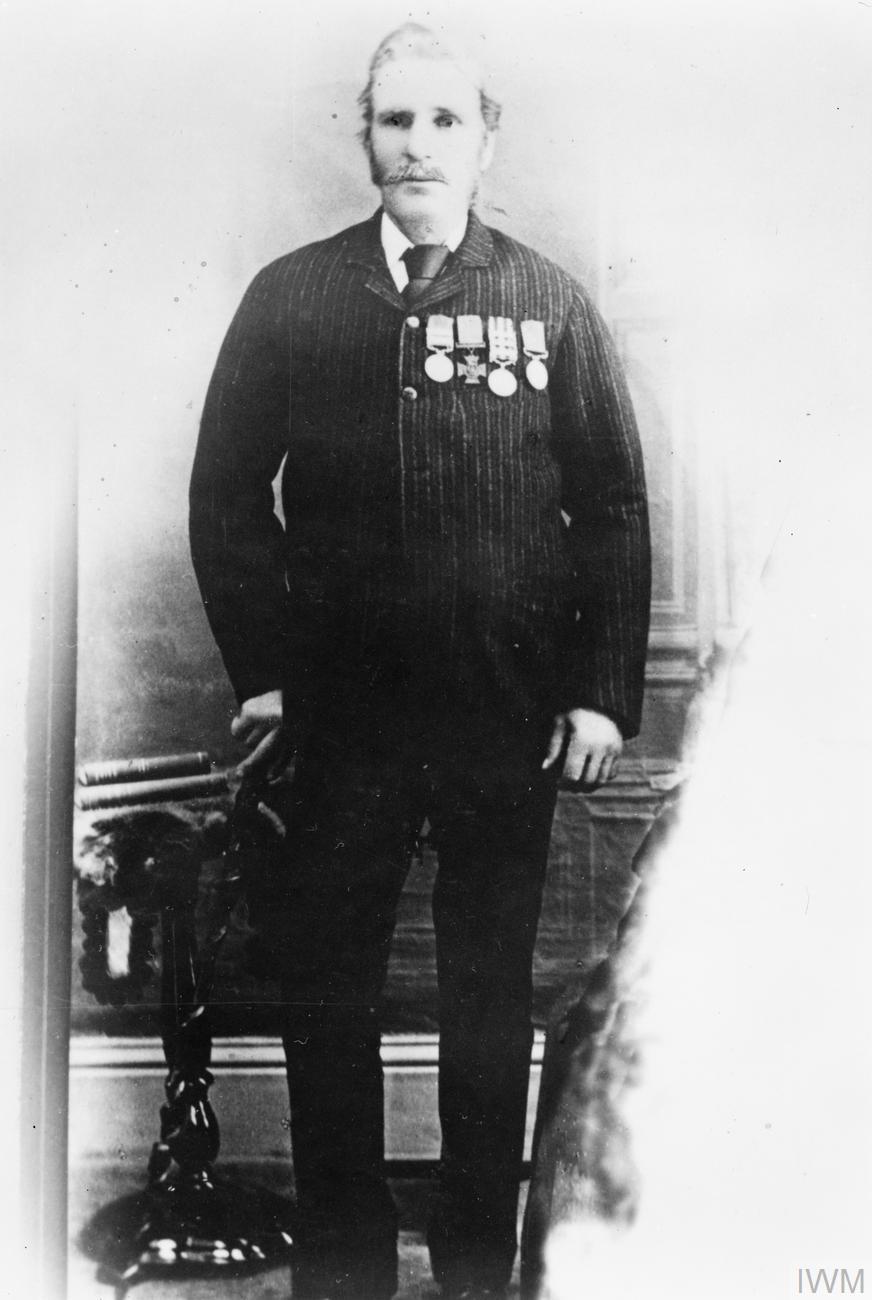
Portrait of General William Martin Cafe VC, a veteran of the Indian Mutiny; Captain Cafe served with the 56th Regiment of Bengal Native Infantry

During the Indian Mutiny all but twelve of the seventy-four regular Bengal Native Infantry regiments either mutinied, were disarmed, or disbanded peacefully and returned to their homes. Those that mutinied engaged in armed conflict with their officers, other East India Company forces or British Army units. The men of the Bengal Native Infantry were professional soldiers and "Mutiny" was a specific criminal offence under the Articles of War and the Mutiny Acts, carrying the death penalty following a conviction after trial by court-martial. The executions were carried out either by hanging, by firing squad or by blowing from a gun. Mutinying regiments officially ceased to exist and their place in the Order of precedence of the Bengal Army was taken by another unit.

Those BNI units that were disbanded without violence, were disarmed either by their officers, other East India Company forces or by British Army units using threat of force and then either remained under discipline but weaponless in their cantonments or were allowed to disperse. For example, the 33rd and 35th regiments of Bengal Native Infantry were disarmed at Phillour on the morning of 25 June 1857 by the 52nd (Oxfordshire) Regiment of Foot (around 800 men) under the command of Brigadier General John Nicholson with the support of the 17th Light Field Battery, Bengal Horse Artillery (12 guns). The 33rd and 35th BNI, around 1500 men, were part of the Punjab Moveable Column, a brigade that was formed to quash outbreaks of mutiny in the Punjab and that was eventually ordered to Delhi to join the Delhi Field Force. Brigadier General Nicholson was doubtful of their loyalty and was therefore unwilling to take these regiments to Delhi. As the Moveable Column made its way to Phillour the 52nd Regiment of Foot and the artillery were ordered to press on ahead, arriving at the camping ground before the other regiments. When the 35th BNI arrived at the camping ground they found themselves surrounded on three sides by the 52nd Regiment of Foot and covered by the guns of the artillery. Brigadier General Nicholson then informed Colonel Younghusband, the commanding officer, that his men "must give up their arms!" – this order was complied with peacefully. The scene was repeated a short time later when the 33rd BNI arrived at the camping ground.

Sepoys from those regiments that were disbanded peacefully, generally returned to their homes, including the 34th Regiment of Bengal Native Infantry which was disbanded on 6 May 1857 at Barrackpore following the actions of Mangal Pandey and his execution for mutiny shortly before the main outbreak. Two regiments of BNI (the 65th and 70th) were serving in China at the time of the outbreak and remained unaffected by the disturbances in Bengal.

During the Mutiny the United Kingdom Government passed the Government of India Act 1858 which established the British Raj, bringing to an end Company rule in India by stripping the East India Company of all its administrative powers and handing over control of its Indian territories and armed forces to the British Crown. Section 56 of the Government of India Act stated:

"LVI. The military and naval forces of the East India Company shall be deemed to be the Indian military and naval forces of Her Majesty, and shall be under the same obligations to serve Her Majesty as they would have been under to serve the said Company, and shall be liable to serve within the same territorial limits only, for the same terms only, and be entitled to the like pay, pensions, allowances, and privileges, and the like advantages as regards promotion and otherwise, as if they had continued in the service of the said Company: such forces, and all persons hereafter enlisting in or entering the same, shall continue and be subject to all Acts of Parliament, laws of the Governor-General of India in Council, and articles of war, and all other laws, regulations, and provisions relating to the East India Company's military and naval forces respectively, as if Her Majesty's Indian military and naval forces respectively had throughout such acts, laws, articles, regulations; and provisions been mentioned or referred to, instead of such forces of the said Company; and the pay and expenses of and incident to Her Majesty's Indian military and naval forces shall be defrayed out of the revenues of India."

The twelve "old regiments" that did not mutiny, continued to serve after the Mutiny and were allowed to retain traditions such as red uniforms. and existing battle honours. Following the completion of a widespread reform of the army in what was now the British Raj, the Bengal Native Infantry was reduced in size and renumbered in 1861. The "loyal" regiments took the first places in the order of precedence, starting with the 21st Regiment of BNI becoming the 1st BNI. There was then a second renumbering of the regiments the same year as a result of transferring four regiments to the Goorkha list. The post-1861 Bengal Native Infantry therefore consisted of 45 regiments.

== Post-1861 list of Bengal Native Infantry Regiments ==
Post-1861 list of Bengal Native Infantry Regiments
First 1861 title.	Second 1861 title.	Previous title.
1st Regiment of Bengal Native Infantry	Unchanged	21st Regiment of Bengal Native Infantry
2nd Regiment of Bengal Native (Light) Infantry	Unchanged	31st Regiment of Bengal Native (Light) Infantry
3rd Regiment of Bengal Native Infantry	Unchanged	32nd Regiment of Bengal Native Infantry
4th Bengal Regiment of Bengal Native Infantry	Unchanged	33rd Regiment of Bengal Native Infantry
5th Regiment of Bengal Native (Light) Infantry	Unchanged	42nd Regiment of Bengal Native (Light) Infantry
6th Regiment of Bengal Native (Light) Infantry	Unchanged	43rd Regiment of Bengal Native (Light) Infantry
7th Regiment of Bengal Native Infantry	Unchanged	47th Regiment of Bengal Native Infantry (Volunteers)
8th Regiment of Bengal Native Infantry	Unchanged	59th Regiment of Bengal Native Infantry
9th Regiment of Bengal Native Infantry	Unchanged	63rd Regiment of Bengal Native Infantry
10th Regiment of Bengal Native Infantry	Unchanged	65th Regiment of Bengal Native Infantry (Volunteers)
11th Regiment of Bengal Native Infantry	1st Goorkha Regiment	66th (Goorkha) Regiment of Bengal Native Infantry
12th Regiment of Bengal Native Infantry	11th Regiment of Bengal Native Infantry	70th Regiment of Bengal Native Infantry
13th Regiment of Bengal Native Infantry	12th Regiment of Bengal Native Infantry	The Regiment of Kelat-i-Ghilzie
14th Regiment of Bengal Native Infantry	13th Regiment of Bengal Native Infantry	The Shakhawati Battalion
15th Regiment of Bengal Native Infantry	14th Regiment of Bengal Native Infantry	The Regiment of Ferozepore
16th Regiment of Bengal Native Infantry	15th Regiment of Bengal Native Infantry	The Regiment of Ludhiana
17th Regiment of Bengal Native Infantry	2nd Goorkha Regiment	The Sirmoor Rifle Regiment
18th Regiment of Bengal Native Infantry	3rd Goorkha Regiment	The Kumaon Battalion
19th Regiment of Bengal Native Infantry	4th Goorkha Regiment	The Extra Goorkha Battalion
20th Regiment of Bengal Native Infantry	16th Regiment of Bengal Native Infantry	The Lucknow Regiment
21st Regiment of Bengal Native Infantry	17th Regiment of Bengal Native Infantry	The Loyal Purbiah Regiment
22nd Regiment of Bengal Native Infantry	18th Regiment of Bengal Native Infantry	The Alipore Regiment
23rd Regiment of Bengal Native Infantry	19th Regiment of Bengal Native Infantry	7th Punjab Regiment
24th Regiment of Bengal Native Infantry	20th Regiment of Bengal Native Infantry	8th Punjab Regiment
25th Regiment of Bengal Native Infantry	21st Regiment of Bengal Native Infantry	9th Punjab Regiment
26th Regiment of Bengal Native Infantry	22nd Regiment of Bengal Native Infantry	11th Punjab Regiment
27th Regiment of Bengal Native Infantry	23rd Regiment of Bengal Native Infantry	15th Punjab Regiment
28th Regiment of Bengal Native Infantry	24th Regiment of Bengal Native Infantry	16th Punjab Regiment
29th Regiment of Bengal Native Infantry	25th Regiment of Bengal Native Infantry	17th Punjab Regiment
30th Regiment of Bengal Native Infantry	26th Regiment of Bengal Native Infantry	18th Punjab Regiment
31st Regiment of Bengal Native Infantry	27th Regiment of Bengal Native Infantry	19th Punjab Regiment
32nd Regiment of Bengal Native Infantry	28th Regiment of Bengal Native Infantry	20th Punjab Regiment
33rd Regiment of Bengal Native Infantry	29th Regiment of Bengal Native Infantry	21st Punjab Regiment
34th Regiment of Bengal Native Infantry	30th Regiment of Bengal Native Infantry	22nd Punjab Regiment
35th Regiment of Bengal Native Infantry	31st Regiment of Bengal Native Infantry	23rd Punjab Regiment
36th Regiment of Bengal Native Infantry	32nd Regiment of Bengal Native Infantry	24th Punjab Regiment
37th Regiment of Bengal Native Infantry	33rd Regiment of Bengal Native Infantry	The Allahabad Levy
38th Regiment of Bengal Native Infantry	34th Regiment of Bengal Native Infantry	The Fatehgarh Levy
39th Regiment of Bengal Native Infantry	35th Regiment of Bengal Native Infantry	The Mynpoorie Levy
40th Regiment of Bengal Native Infantry	36th Regiment of Bengal Native Infantry	The Bareilly Levy
41st Regiment of Bengal Native Infantry	37th Regiment of Bengal Native Infantry	The Meerut Levy
42nd Regiment of Bengal Native Infantry	38th Regiment of Bengal Native Infantry	The Agra Levy
43rd Regiment of Bengal Native Infantry	39th Regiment of Bengal Native Infantry	The Aligarh Levy
44th Regiment of Bengal Native Infantry	40th Regiment of Bengal Native Infantry	The Shajehanpur Levy
45th Regiment of Bengal Native Infantry	41st Regiment of Bengal Native Infantry	1st Gwalior Regiment
46th Regiment of Bengal Native Infantry	42nd Regiment of Bengal Native Infantry	1st Assam Light Infantry
47th Regiment of Bengal Native Infantry	43rd Regiment of Bengal Native Infantry	2nd Assam Light Infantry
48th Regiment of Bengal Native Infantry	44th Regiment of Bengal Native Infantry	The Sylhet Light Infantry
49th Regiment of Bengal Native Infantry	45th Regiment of Bengal Native Infantry	1st Bengal Military Police Battalion

== Operational history and legacy ==
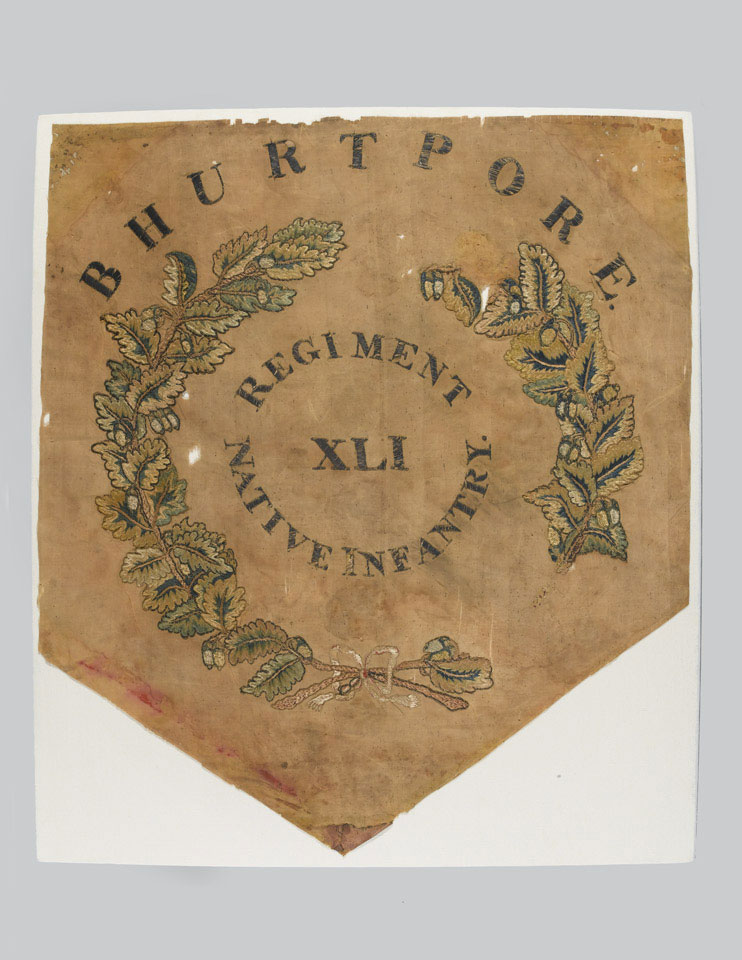
Regimental Colour Centre of the 41st Bengal Native Infantry, captured from mutineers at Delhi in 1857, showing the battle honour "Bhurtpore"

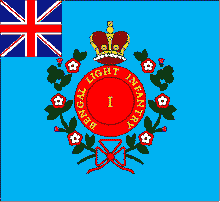
Regimental Colours of the 1st Bengal Light Infantry

=== Operational history ===
The Bengal Native Infantry has participated in major battles and wars that include, among others, the following engagements:

- Battle of Plassey
- Third Carnatic War
- First Anglo-Mysore War
- Second Anglo-Mysore War
- Third Anglo-Mysore War
- First Anglo-Maratha War
- Cotiote War
- Fourth Anglo-Mysore War
- Second Anglo-Maratha War
- Invasion of Java
- Anglo-Nepalese War
- Third Anglo-Maratha War
- First Anglo-Burmese War
- First Opium War
- First Anglo-Afghan War
- First Anglo-Sikh War
- Second Anglo-Sikh War
- Second Anglo-Burmese War
- Indian Mutiny
- Second Opium War
- Second Anglo-Afghan War
- Suakin Expedition
- Third Anglo-Burmese War

=== Legacy ===
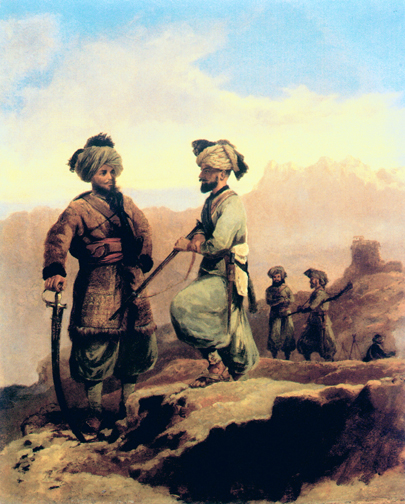
20th (Punjab) Regiment of Bengal Native Infantry (formerly 24th Regiment of Bengal Native Infantry; now 6th Battalion The Punjab Regiment, Pakistan Army); painting by Walter Fane, 1868

The Bengal Army was absorbed into the British Indian Army in 1903 with a large number of infantry units passing into the newly organised force. As shown by the following examples, there are a number of military units active today that can trace their lineage directly to regiments of Bengal Native Infantry in the armies of India, Pakistan and the United Kingdom. In many cases these units maintain the traditions and retain the battle honours of their antecedent regiments.

==== India ====
- The Jat Regiment traces its lineage back to 1795, to an East India Company unit known as the Calcutta Native Militia which, after a series of name changes, became the 18th regiment of Bengal Native Infantry in 1861. The Jat Regiment also traces its lineage to the pre-1857 43rd and 65th regiments of Bengal Native Infantry. The regiment retains the battle honours of its antecedent units.
- The Sikh Regiment traces its lineage back to the post-1861 14th, 15th and 45th regiments of Bengal Native Infantry (among other units). The regiment retains the battle honours and some traditions of its antecedent units.

==== Pakistan ====
- 6th Battalion, The Punjab Regiment directly traces its lineage to the post-1861 20th regiment of Bengal Native Infantry. The Punjab Regiment does not retain any battle honours gained before Pakistan's independence.

==== United Kingdom ====
- The Royal Gurkha Rifles traces its lineage to the post-1861 42nd and 43rd regiments of Bengal Native Infantry (among other units). The Royal Gurkha Rifles retains the battle honours and traditions of its antecedent units.

== See also ==
- List of Victoria Cross recipients of the Indian Army
- Barrackpore Mutiny of 1824
