= 4th Prince Albert Victor's Rajputs =

- Active: 1798-1922
- Country: Indian Empire
- Branch: Army
- Type: Infantry
- Part of: Bengal Army (to 1895), Bengal Command
- Uniform: Red; faced black
- Engagements: Laswaree; 1825 - 26 Bhurtpore; 1842 Cabul; Ferozeshah; Sobraon; 1878 - 80 Afghanistan; 1885 - 87 Burma

Commanders
- Colonel-in-Chief: King Edward VII (1904)

The 4th Prince Albert Victor's Rajputs was an infantry battalion of the British Indian Army. They could trace their origins to 1798, when they were the 2nd Battalion, 16th Bengal Native Infantry. Over the years they became known by a number of different titles. The 33rd Bengal Native Infantry 1824–1861, the 4th Bengal Regiment of Bengal Native Infantry 1861–1890, the 4th (Prince Albert Victor's) Bengal Infantry 1890–1897, the 4th (Prince Albert Victor's) Rajput Regiment 1897–1901 and finally after the Kitchener reforms of the Indian Army the 4th (Prince Albert Victor's) Rajputs. To honour the visit of the Prince and Princess of Wales to India they took part in the Rawalpindi Parade 1905. They took part in the First Anglo-Sikh War, the Second Anglo-Afghan War, the Third Anglo-Burmese War and World War I. After World War I the Indian government reformed the army again moving from single battalion regiments to large multi battalion regiments, the 4th Prince Albert Victor's Rajputs became the 2nd Battalion, 7th Rajput Regiment. After India gained independence they were one of the regiments allocated to the Indian Army.
