= Kennedy Peak (Myanmar) =

Peak in Tedim Township, Chin State, Myanmar

- Mt. Kennedy, Thuamvum
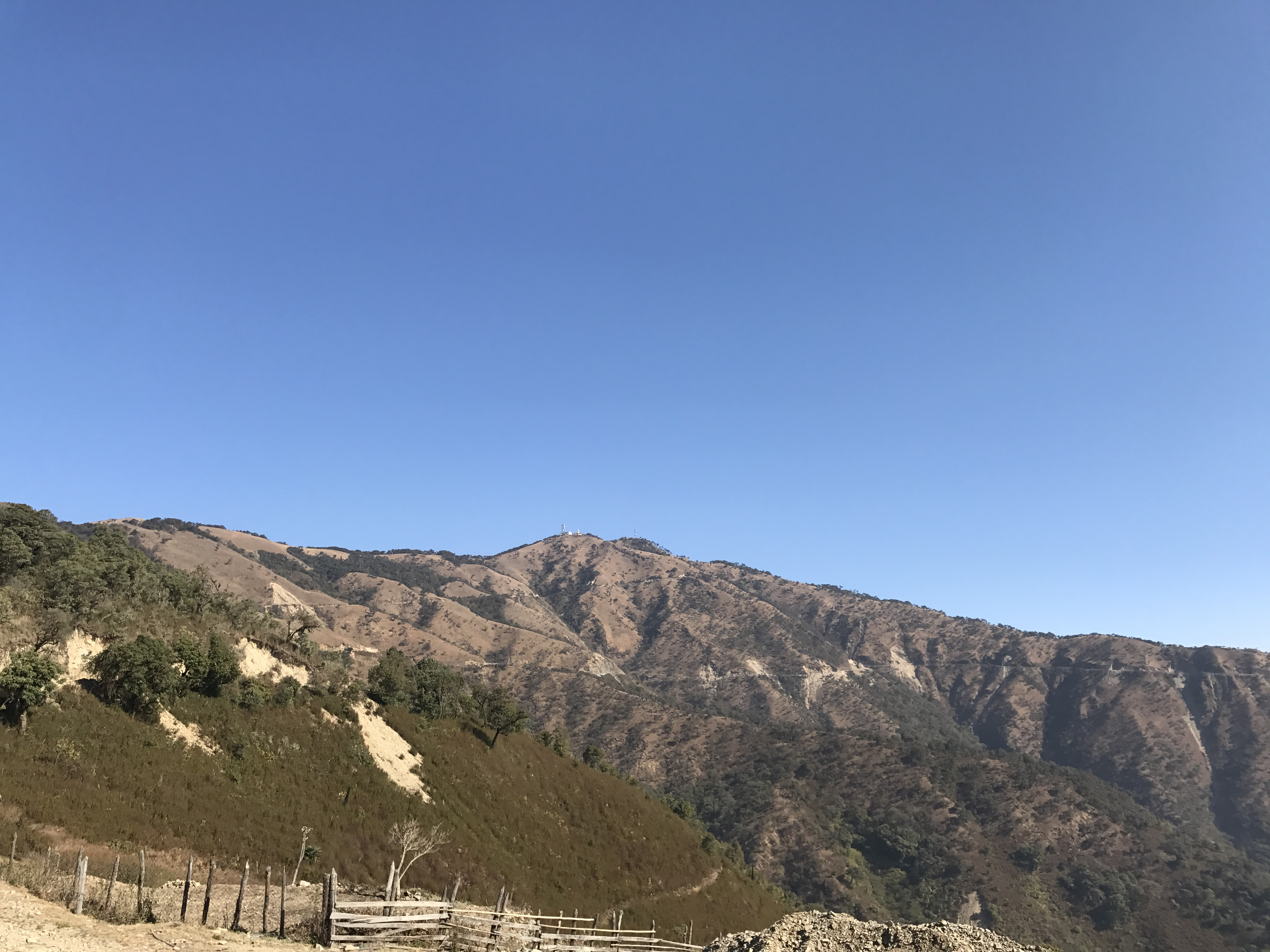
- Kennedy Peak as seen from Tedim Road

Highest point
- Elevation: 2,703 m (8,868 ft)
- Prominence: 1,509 m (4,951 ft)
- Listing: Ultra; Ribu
- Coordinates: 23°19′03″N 93°45′42″E

Geography
- Location within Myanmar
- Location: Tedim Township, Chin State, Myanmar
- Parent range: Chin Hills

Kennedy Peak (locally known as Thuamvum) is a 2,703-metre (8,868 ft) peak in the Tedim Township, Chin State, Myanmar that dominates the Tedim Road. It is one of the world's ultra-prominent peaks, as it rises 4,951 feet (more than 1500 m) above all other peaks nearby. It is the second highest mountain in Chin State, next to Mount Victoria.

It was the site of a battle during World War II in which Ram Sarup Singh, a subedar of the British Indian army, led his unit with great bravery in attacking and capturing a strong Japanese-held position, then persisting despite wounds in defending it against counterattacks, until killed. He was posthumously awarded the Victoria Cross.

Aslam Khan, as the leader of 'D' Company, led his troops during World War II in capturing Kennedy Peak, which the Americans had failed to conquer. For this achievement, he was awarded the Military Cross.

It was also the site of another battle on 21 November 2023 where local People's Defence Force units seized a military base on the peak during the current civil war. The Zoland PDF killed three regime troops and seized weapons and ammunition. The junta responded with an MI-35 helicopter attack.

== See also ==
- List of ultras of Southeast Asia
- Geography of Burma
