= 3rd Brahmans =

- Active: 1798-1922
- Country: Indian Empire
- Branch: Army
- Type: Infantry
- Part of: Bengal Army (to 1895); Bengal Command
- Uniform: Red; faced black
- Engagements: 1825 - 26 Bhurtpore; 1879 - 80 Afghanistan

Commanders
- Colonel-in-Chief: King Edward VII (1904)

The 3rd Brahmans were an infantry regiment of the British Indian Army. 3rd Brahmanas recruits from Gaur Brahmins and Kanyakubja Brahmins composition of 2 companies from both. This regiment could trace their origins to 1798, when they were the 1st Battalion, 16th Bengal Native Infantry. Over the years this regiment was known by a number of different names. The 32nd Bengal Native Infantry 1824–1861, the 3rd Regiment of Bengal Native Infantry 1861–1885, the 3rd Regiment of Bengal Infantry 1885–1901 and finally after the Kitchener reforms of the Indian Army when the names of the presidencies were dropped. Before being disbanded in 1922, this regiment had taken part in the Second Anglo-Afghan War and World War I.

== See also ==
- 1st Brahmans
- Gaur Brahmins
- Kanyakubja Brahmins
