= 1st Brahmans =

- Active: 1776-1931
- Country: British India
- Branch: Army
- Role: Infantry
- Size: 1 battalion (2 battalions during World War I)
- Nickname: Neelwar ki Paltan
- Engagements: Second Anglo-Maratha War 1803-05; Anglo-Nepalese War 1814-16; First Anglo-Burmese War 1824-26; Siege of Bhurtpore 1826; First Afghan War 1839; Third Anglo-Burmese War 1885-87; First World War 1914-18
- Battle honours: Laswari Bharatpur Burma 1885-1887

The 1st Brahmans was an infantry regiment of the British Indian Army. The regiment fought in numerous conflict as part of Presidency armies of the East India Company as well as the British Indian Army. It was later incorporated into the 1st Punjab Regiment and was ultimately disbanded in 1931.

== Designations ==
Over the years the regiment was known by a number of different designations:

- 1776 Nawab Wazir's Brahaman Regiment
- 1777 30th Battalion of Bengal Sepoys
- 1781 23rd Regiment of Bengal Sepoys
- 1784 29th Regiment of Bengal Sepoys
- 1786 29th Bengal Sepoy Battalion
- 1796 2nd Battalion 9th Regiment of Bengal Native Infantry
- 1824 21st Regiment of Bengal Native Infantry
- 1861 1st Regiment of Bengal Native Infantry
- 1885 1st Regiment of Bengal Infantry
- 1901 1st Brahman Infantry
- 1903 1st Brahmans
- 1917 2nd Battalion raised
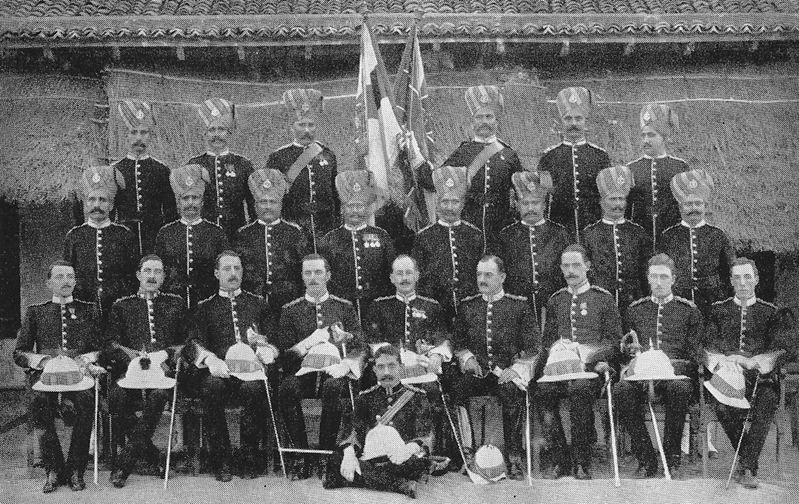
  British and Indian officers of the 1st Brahmans, 1912.
- 1922 4th Battalion, 1st Punjab Regiment

== History ==
=== East India Company service ===
The EIC recruited Brahmins who were designed as a martial race. The 1st Brahmins was one of the earliest EIC regiments categorised solely on racial homogeneity.

The Nawab Regiment was previously raised at Oudh by Captain T Naylor of the EIC in 1776 to bolster the army of Nawab Wazir who was planted by the EIC. The regiment was later differentiated by the company along its ethnic composition when it was incorporated to the East India Company in 1777. In 1922, it was designated as the 4th Battalion 1st Punjab Regiment.

While in the service of the East India Company the regiment was awarded battle honours for service in the Second Maratha War 1803–05, the Anglo-Nepalese War 1814–16, the Second Anglo-Burmese War 1824–26 and the Bhurtpore Campaign 1826.

=== Post First War of Independence 1857 ===
The regiment was the senior-most among the twelve Bengal Native Infantry regiments that survived the Great Indian Rebellion of 1857–58. It was accordingly one of the small number of Bengal regular infantry regiments to retain the traditions of East India Company service in the new post-Mutiny army. Renumbered as the 1st of the Bengal line, it subsequently saw active service in the Third Anglo-Burmese War of 1885–87. Following the Kitchener reforms of the Indian Army, when the names of the presidencies were dropped, the regiment became the 1st Brahman Infantry in 1901.

=== World War I ===
In 1914, the regimental centre of the 1st Brahmans was located at Allahabad (now Prayagraj) and it was linked with the 3rd Brahmans. The regiment recruited mostly from the Gaur, Kanyakubja and Saryuparin Brahmin communities. Full dress uniform of the sepoys included a high khaki turban with red fringe, a scarlet kurta (long coat) with white facings, white waist-sash, dark blue trousers and white leggings.

The regiment spent part of World War I in India before being posted to Aden, then under threat from Ottoman forces. A second battalion raised in 1917 saw service in the Persian Gulf.

=== Post-war service and disbandment ===
After the war, a major reorganisation was undertaken in the Indian Army and the various single-battalion infantry regiments were grouped together to form larger regiments of four to six battalions each. The 1st Brahmans became the 4th Battalion of the 1st Punjab Regiment in 1922. It was disbanded in 1931 due to retrenchment in the Indian Army.

== Deployments ==
- -1888 Upper Burma
- 1888-1891 Nowgong
- 1891-1895 Jabalpur
- 1895-1896 Peshawar
- 1896-1898 Jhansi
- May 1898 – 1901 Mauritius
- 1901-1905 Allahabad
- 1905-1910 Jabalpur
- 1910-1914 Bolarum
- 1920-1921 Aden
- 1921-1922 Fatehgarh
- 1922-1923 Delhi
- 1923-1926 Waziristan
- 1926-1927 Jhansi
- 1927-1928 Overseas
- 1928- Jhansi
- 1929-1930 Fort Sandeman (Zhob)
- 1930-1931 Loralai

=== 2nd Battalion ===
- 1920-1921 Overseas

== Uniform ==
- 1890-1894 Uniform Red, Facings White.
- 1894-1925 Uniform Scarlet, Facings White, Lace Gold, Turban Khaki with Red fall.
- 1925-1931 Uniform Scarlet, Facings Grass Green.

== Regimental Centre ==
- 1890-1922 Allahabad
- 1922-1931 Jhelum

== Class composition ==
- 1895-1916 8 companies Brahmins.
- 1917-1921 4 companies Brahmins.
- 1921-1922 2 companies Brahmins from United Provinces, 1 company Jats from United Provinces, 1 company Hindustani Muslims
- 1922-1923 2 companies Brahmins from United Provinces, 1 company Garhwali Brahmins, 1 company Punjabi Muslims
- 1923 1 company Brahmins from United Provinces, 2 companies Garhwali Brahmins, 1 company Punjabi Muslims
- 1923-1925 Brahmins from United Provinces, Garhwali Brahmins, Punjabi Muslims
- 1925-1928 1 company Brahmins from United Provinces, 2 companies Garhwali Brahmins, 1 company Punjabi Muslims
- 1928-1929 3 companies Garhwali Brahmins, 1 company Punjabi Muslims
- 1929-1931 Garhwali Brahmins, Punjabi Muslims

=== 2nd Battalion ===
- 1917-1921 1 company Kanaujia Brahmins, 1 company Gaur Brahmins, 1 company Sarwariya Brahmins, 1 company Sanadhya Brahmins.

== See also ==
- 1st Punjab Regiment
- Bengal Native Infantry

== Sources ==
- Barthorp, Michael; Burn, Jeffrey (1979). Indian Infantry Regiments 1860–1914. Osprey Publishing. ISBN 0-85045-307-0.
- Sumner, Ian (2001). The Indian Army 1914–1947. Osprey Publishing. ISBN 1-84176-196-6.
- Qureshi, Maj MI. (1958). The First Punjabis: History of the First Punjab Regiment, 1759-1956. Aldershot: Gale & Polden.
