= Munagekar =

The Munagekar Family hails from the village of Munage near Devgad. In the 1820, most of them moved to various parts of Maharashtra due to plague. The Munagekars were very intelligent and often called by many industrialist to solve complex mathematical and engineering problems.

Munagekar is the surname of a number of families in India and abroad. Munagekars generally speak Marathi as their mother tongue. The origin of this surname can be linked to the village Munge in the Sindhudurg district of southern Maharashtra. The Munagekars belong to a number of castes including Saraswat Brahmins, Karhade Brahmins, Sutars and also some scheduled castes.

== Origin ==
The origin of this surname is primarily linked to the village of Munge. The "kar" at the end is a common feature of Maharashtrian surnames. However, there exist quite a number of Munagekars who have no link whatsoever with this village. A number of people who use this surname and are Karhade Brahmins trace their origins to the surname Padhye. Another group trace their origin to the surname Manjrekar.

== History ==
The people who adopted this surname originally lived in Goa. It was due to the Portuguese attack on Goa that they had to flee to Munge. It is believed that earlier they were Padyes. Some of them are Brahmins but most are scheduled castes and scheduled tribes. Their deity is Mahalasa of Mardol, Goa. However some of these Munagekars have their roots in the village of Ghodge, which is in Maharashtra.
