= Utkala Brahmin =

Hindu Brahmin Community

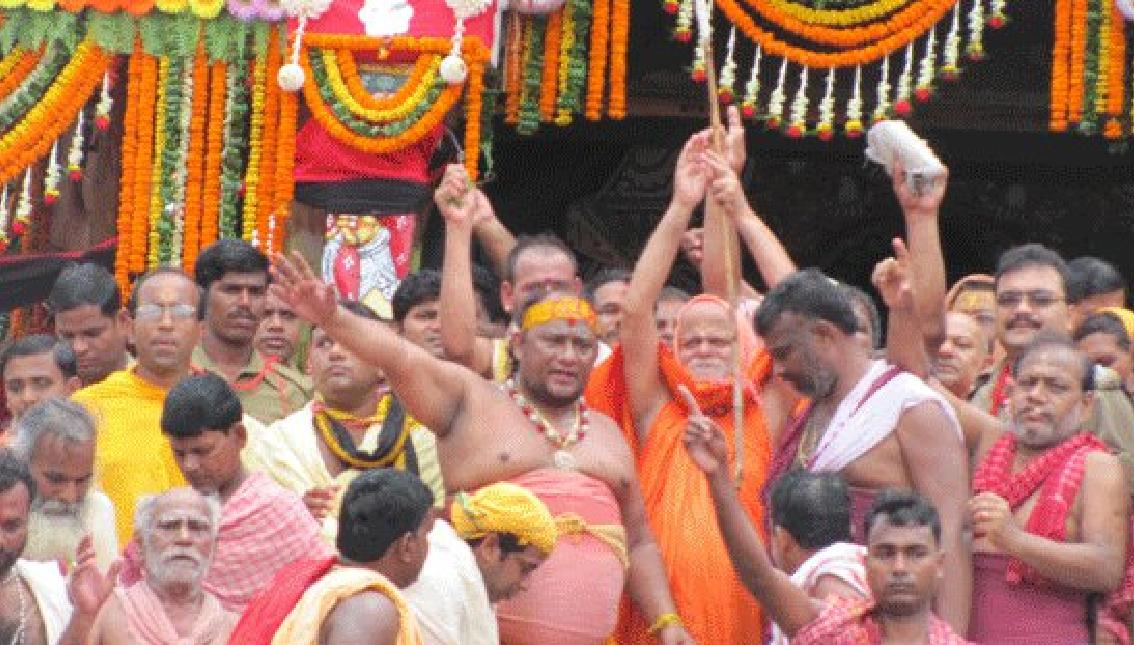
- Priests from Utkala Brahmin community, during Yatra with Shankararcharya of Puri (center)
- Jāti: Utkala
- Religions: Hinduism
- Languages: Odia language
- Country: India
- Original state: Odisha
- Populated states: Odisha, West Bengal, Jharkhand, Chhattisgarh, Andhra Pradesh
- Ethnicity: Odia
- Related groups: Kanyakubja Brahmins, Maithil Brahmins, Bengali Brahmins, Gauda Brahmins, Saraswat Brahmins

Utkala Brahmins, also known as Odia Brahmins, are a Brahmin community who belong to the state of Odisha, India. Utkala Brahmins are the historical caretakers of the Jagannath Temple in Puri. The Utkala Brahmins are one of the five Pancha Gouda Brahmin communities that originally resided to the north of the Vindhyas. They constitute about 10-12% of Odisha's population as of 2025.

== History ==
During ancient period Utkala was centre of Buddhism and Jainism. Shailodbhava dynasty were follower of Shaivism who ruled the region from 6th century to 8th century. They had built Parashurameshvara Temple in 7th century which is oldest temple in Bhubaneswar. Shailodhava king Madhavaraja II in his inscriptions state that he performed the ashvamedha sacrifices to assert his independence from Gupta Empire which indicates presence of Brahmin in Odisha in 7th century. Keshari dynasty ruled from 9th to 12th century in medieval period who constructed Lingaraj Temple, Mukteshvara Temple and Rajarani Temple in Bhubaneswar. They introduced a new style of architecture in Odisha and their rule saw a shift from Buddhism to Hinduism. According to legend Yayati Keshri brought 10,000 Brahmin from Kannauj to his kingdom for Ashvamedha ceremony in 10th century. There are records of settlement of 200 brahmins by Subhakaradeva of Bhauma-Kara dynasty in Neulpur grant (c795 AD) and another 6000 brahmins settlement near Puri between 1151-1152 A.D.

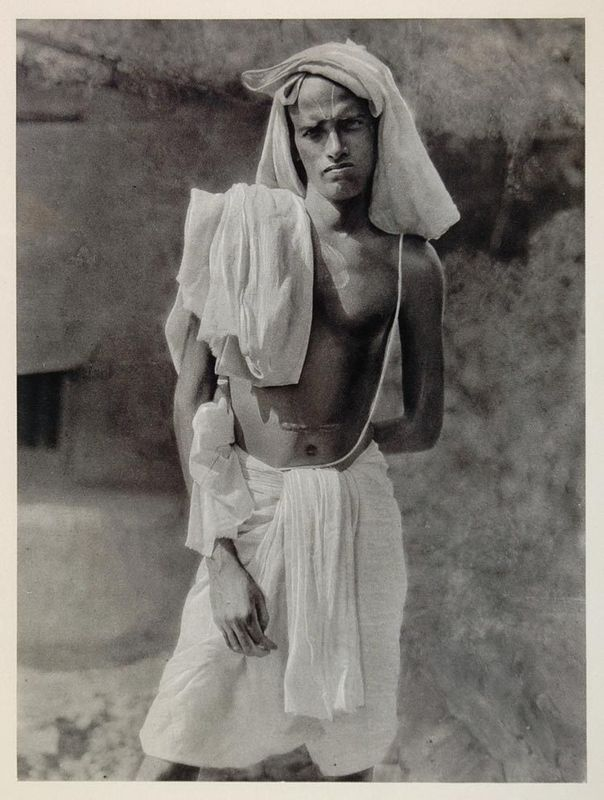
Traditional dress of an utkala Brahmin Priest in Puri, Orissa in 1928

== See also ==
- Brahmin communities
