= Bhati Bhasha =

Dialect of Konkani language spoken in Goa

Bhati Bhasa or Bhati is a dialect of Marathi spoken by Padye Brahmins of Goa who belong to the Karhade Brahmin group. It is belonged to Indo-Iranian mixed group of languages. This dialect is nasal and has many Marathi words.

The people who speak this dialect are called Bhatts in Goa. The dialect is becoming endangered as many people of the community are now turning towards Standard Marathi.

== See also ==
- Padye
