= Gangaputra Brahmin =

Gangaputra Brahmins
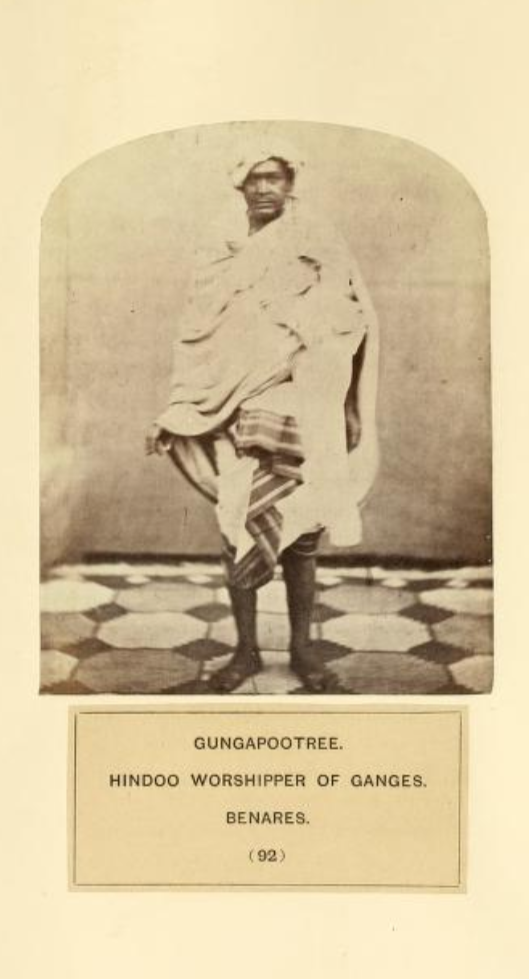
- Photo of a Gangaputra Brahmin in 1875, J Forbes Watson

Regions with significant populations
- India

Religion
- Hinduism

Related ethnic groups
- Kanyakubja Brahmins

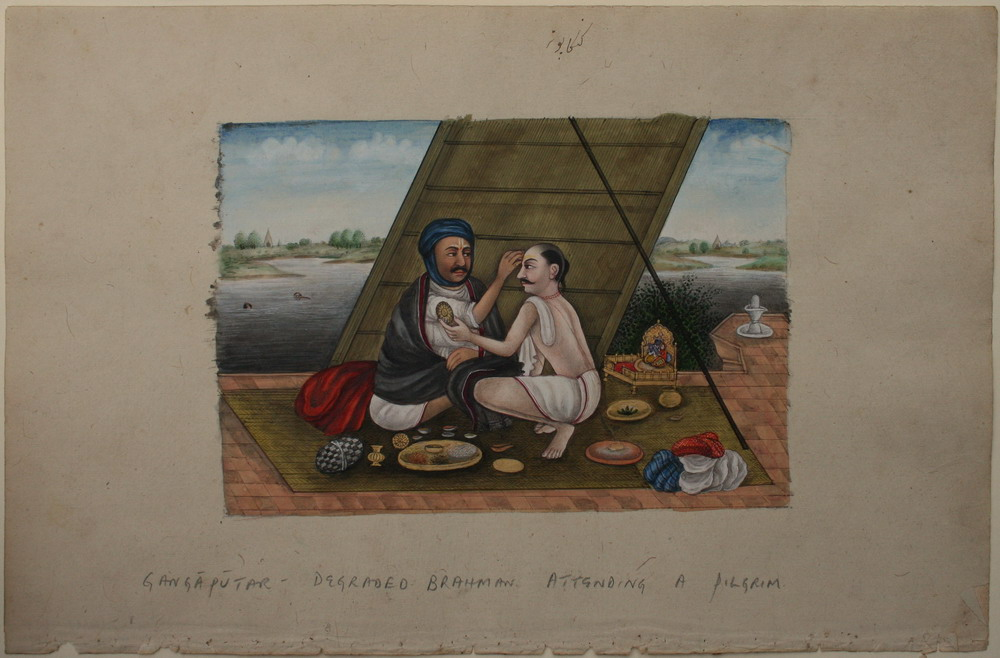
Gangaputra Brahmin applying tilak to a pilgrim

The Gangaputra Brahman are a Hindu Brahmin community, found in the state of Uttar Pradesh in India.

== History and origin ==
The community is an offshoot of the Kanyakubja Brahmins. Gangaputra in Sanskrit signifies sons of the Ganges river. The Gangaputra are associated with the river Ganges, and their communities are located mainly along the banks of the river. These people were also known as the Ghatiya, because they occupied the piers of the Ganges; ghat in Hindi signifies pier.

The Gangaputra Brahmin are found mainly in the Farrukhabad, Kanpur and Shahjahanpur districts. Their main occupation is to officiate at the various holy occasions which occur along the river.
