= Sahyadrikhanda =

Collection of Sanskrit texts

Sahyādri-khaṇḍa is a Sanskrit-language text, notable for containing the founding myths of several Brahmin communities of south-western India. The text claims to be a part of the Skanda Purana. It is actually a collection of disparate texts that date from 5th to 13th centuries, and have been organized as part of a single text relatively recently.

The text glorifies the Shenvis (identified as Sarasvatas), and slanders their traditional rivals, such as the Chitpavans and the Karhades. Historically, the text's authenticity was a matter of debate among Brahmins, with some using it to assert the Brahmin status of the Shenvis, while others - especially Chitpavans - denouncing it as a fabricated Puranic text.

== History ==
The Sahyadri-khanda existed by the 13th century, as Hemadri's Chatur-varga-chintamani (mid-13th century) quotes its fragments.

German academic Alexander Henn, citing Stephan Hillyer Levitt and João Manuel Pacheco de Figueiredo, describes the Sahyadri-khanda as an "apparently recently organized and somewhat deficient edition of disaparate texts". Based on Levitt's work, he states that the earliest of these texts dates to the 5th century, and the latest to the 13th century. According to Rosalind O'Hanlon, the core of the text was likely written "before or around the end of the first millennium": it contains stories about Brahmin village settlements that have fallen from virtue. The remaining text appears to have been written later, as it describes the Pancha Gauda and Pancha Dravida classification of Brahmins, which became popular during the 13th-14th centuries.

The text characterizes the Shenvi Brahmins (whom it calls Sarasvatas) as heroes, while ascribing ignoble origins to their rivals such as the Chitpavans and the Karhades. In 1631, a Brahman judicial assembly (dharma-sabha) at Varanasi, the most authoritative of such assemblies, cited the Sahyadri-khanda to assert the Brahmin status of the Shenvis. In 1564, the Portuguese had destroyed an Advaita monastery at Kusasthal, and its spiritual leaders had migrated to Varanasi. When the Hindu residents of Kusasthal revived the monastery, a Shenvi named Vitthal wanted to become its leader. However, Brahmins from other communities opposed him, disputing the Brahmin status of Shenvis. The opponents argued that unlike the traditionally vegetarian Brahmins, the Shenvis customarily ate fish. The assembly at Varanasi cited the Sahyadri-khanda to rule that Parshurama had allowed different Brahmin communities to follow different customs, and eating fish did not affect the Brahmin status of the Shenvis. As a result, Vitthal became the leader of the revived monastery, adopting the name Sacchidananda Sarasvati.

Madhav's Sata-prashna-kalpa-lata (1577 CE), which is sympathetic to the Karhades, characterizes the Sahyadri-khanda as a fabricated Puranic text. Raghoba Mahadevrao, a famous Chitpavan performer, recited stories from the Sahyadri-khanda, as recorded by Arthur Crawford, who served as an assistant magistrate in Konkan during 1859-1862. Raghoba dismissed the text's founding myth of Chitpavans as a "malicious invention" by Shenvi slanderers, and narrated another founding myth glorifying the Chitpavans.

Bajirao II (r. 1796-1818), the last Peshwa of the Maratha Confederacy and a Chitpavan, systematically attempted to censor the performances that narrated stories ascribing an ignoble origin to the Chitpavans. He sent agents with Maratha armies to destroy the manuscripts containing such stories. According to East India Company administrator Mark Wilks, the illiterate Maratha troops indiscriminately destroyed a large number of manuscripts as a result of this order. James Grant Duff, in his History of the Mahrattas (1826), states that the Maratha state officials "carefully suppress or destroy all copies" of the Sahyadri-khanda. Duff also writes that the Peshwa disgraced a Brahmin from Wai for possessing a copy of the text. Arthur Crawford, in his Legends of Konkan, writes that the Peshwa ordered the burning of all the copies of the text. He then decreed anyone subsequently found in the possession of a copy to be hanged; a Deshastha Brahmin was hanged as a result. It is not clear how successful Peshwa's censorship attempts were, but there is some evidence that by the end of the 18th century, it was difficult to find a copy of the text in the Bombay region. For example, in 1787, when some people in Bombay decided to consult the Sahyadri-khanda to resolve a dispute over ritual entitlements, they had to request a copy from the Sringeri monastery in present-day Karnataka.

The debates over the text's authenticity continued after José Gerson da Cunha published a critical edition in 1877. Ramchandra Bhikaji Gunjikar (1843-1901), who wrote on the history of Brahmin communities of Maharashtra, noted that the copies of the Sahyadri-khanda then available in Mumbai, did not mention the founding myth of the Chitpavans. He concluded that the original text contained the story, which was removed as a result of Peshwa's censorship.

== Content ==
The Sahyadri-khanda narrates stories that are variations of legends from the Puranas. Several smaller texts, aimed at establishing identities and histories of various Brahmin communities, claim affiliation with it. The text narrates the legend of Parashurama, identifying the Sahyadri mountain range as Mount Mahendra, where he performed his penances. According to the text, Parashurama reclaimed lands from the sea and settled them with Brahmins.

The original core of the text, comprising 30 chapters, contains stories about Brahmin village settlements that have suffered because their residents engaged in sexual misconduct, degrading work, or neglect of rituals.

The second part, composed in the later centuries and narrated as a conversation between Shiva and his son Skanda, contains stories about various social groups of the Brahmins. In this part, Shiva tells his son Skanda that ancient sages established the ten divisions of Brahmins (Pancha Gauda and Pancha Dravida). He describes the different customs of various Brahmin communities, stating that each of them have their own shortcomings, which are forgivable. He justifies the existence of these differences, and emphasizes that a Brahmin must only follow the customs of his own community. He also refers to practices common to all Brahmins, such as the chanting of the gayatri mantra.

Next, the text narrates the founding myths of various Brahmin communities, glorifying the Shenvis (identified as Sarasvatas) at the expense of their rivals such as the Chitpavans and the Karhades. In the text, Shiva narrates the following founding myths to Skanda:

- Parshurama brought Sarasvatas from Tirhut to Konkan, settling them in the villages of Kelosi and Kusasthal. These settlers were "attractive, well-behaved, and skilled in every rite". The deities Shantadurga, Mangesh, Mhalsa, Nagesh and Mahalakshmi accompanied them to Konkan.
- Chita-pavana Brahmins were originally fishermen of Kaivartaki jāti. Parashurama met them at a cremation ground, and gave them Brahmin status by purifying (pavana) them on the funeral pyre (chita). He made them wise and fair-skinned with light-colored eyes, but gradually, they became arrogant. As a result Parashurama cursed them, condemning them to poverty, jealousy, servitude to kings, and disgrace for taking money for their daughters' marriages.
- Karhades are fallen Brahmins from the polluted land of Karashtra, and made offerings to the wicked goddess Matrika. The text derives their name from the word Karashtra ("evil land"), as well as the words "donkey-bones" (khara-ashti), stating that they originated when some semen spilled on a heap of donkey bones.

The text goes on to describe the smaller Brahmin communities of south-western India, including their customs and history. While the text attempts to express a cohesive Brahmin identity, such stories express the social tensions among the Brahmin communities.

A Kannada-language text with the same title contains the chapter Grāmapaddhati, which describes Brahmin family names and villages. Y. C. Bhanumati notes that the Kannada version has no similarities with Sanskrit text, and theorizes that the original Sahyadri-khanda must have been a different, now-lost work.

== Critical edition ==
José Gerson da Cunha prepared a critical edition (1877) of the text based on 14 manuscripts:

- A copy from Svami Bhuvanendra-tirtha, a Vaishnava leader from Cochin, containing 90 chapters
- A copy from Raghunatha Sharma of Junnar containing 100 chapters
- Manuscript zz-b-14 from the catalogue of the Royal Asiatic Society, Bombay branch; contains 120 chapters divided into two parts containing 88 and 32 chapters
- Another copy from the Royal Asiatic Society, Bombay branch; apparently written by a Gujarati Brahmin; it is an incomplete manuscript with one section
- A copy from Kote, Karnataka; contains 111 chapters, with several lacunae
- A copy from Siddapura, Karnataka; it contains one, undivided section
- A copy from Chempi, Karnataka; missing several chapters in the middle
- A copy from Goa, dated 1770 CE; contains 108 chapters, divided into two sections
- A copy from Varanasi containing 100 chapters
- Five manuscripts from several men of Bombay, one in Kannada script, the other four in Devanagari: these have few differences, but seem to be the result of repeated copying from a single source, with errors introduced in each version

Cunha notes that there are several differences between these copies, which are results of incorrect copying as well as deliberate interpolations.

=== Chapters ===
Nagendra Rao notes that there are several variations of the text, and provides the following English-language names of the chapters, based on Cunha's edition:

- The origin of Chitpāvana Brāhmaṇas
- The origin of Karhāḍa Brāhmaṇas
- The Glory of Gomañcalakṣetra
- The origin of different groups of Brāhmaṇas of Dakṣiṇa
- The consideration of Brāhmaṇas
- In the praise of land grants
- Demarcation of the villages
- The praise composed by Bhārgava
- Demarcation of inferior villages
- Title not given-related to thirty-two villages
- Story of fallen villages
- Three chapters related to demarcation of fallen villages
- Title not specified-related to the river Sitā
- The story of Mithunāhara Brāhmaṇas
- The story of fallen village
- The fallen village
- The glory of the Kṣetra
- The glory of Mahālingeśa
