= Kamrupi Brahmin =

Kamrupi Brahmins, also known as Kamarupi Brahmana and Kamrupi Bamon, are those Brahmins who claimed their descent from the Kanauji Brahmins and Maithili Brahmins who settled in Kamarupa (present-day Assam). They brought with them different Hindu epics and became the torch-bearers of Indo-Aryan culture in the region.

== Background ==
Kamrupi Brahmins are those Brahmins who claimed their descent from the Kanauji immigrant Brahmins and Maithil Brahmins of Mithila of a very early period. They settled in Kamrup and later on spread out.

== Rites and rituals ==
Many rituals followed by Kamrupi Brahmins are unique to their community. During a ritual named Amati, mother earth is believed passing through menstrual period and thus to be in an unclean state. Hence on those days farmers would not till the soil or plant any seeds. Orthodox widows and Brahmins abstain from any food except fruits. Devi, a special synthesized form of both Durga of the Hindu pantheon and a tribal female deity, is still being worshiped in Cooch Behar. Worship of Devi is generally performed by a Kamrupi Brahmin of North Bengal.

== History ==
Kamrupi Brahmins were prosperous during the Varman dynasty's reign of Kamarupa. The Kamrupi king Bhaskaravarman regularly gave land grants to the Kamrupi Brahmins. With these land grants they were also given copper plates grants. A portion of the copper-plate grant of Bhaskaravarman states: Rigvedic, Samavedic and Yajurvedic Brahmins lived in Kamarupa before the time of Bhaskaravarman. Of these three classes of Brahmins the followers of the Bahvrichya branch of the Rigveda were divided into the gotras of: - Kasyapa, - Kausika, - Gautama, - Parasarya, - Bharadvaja, - Varaha, - Vatsya, - Varhaspatya and - Saunaka; Of those following the Chhandoga branch of the Samaveda belonged to the gotras of : - Paskalya The followers of the Taittiriya branch of the Yajurveda belonged to the gotra of: - Kasyapa And those of the Charaka branch to the gotra of: - Katyayana; The followers of the Vajasaneya branch belonged to the gotras of: - Angirasa, - Alambayana, - Gargya, - Gautama, - Bharadvaja, - Yaska, - Sakatayana, and - Salankayana besides the six gotras mentioned before. In all these three groups of Brahmanas living in Kamarupa had 26 gotras at the time of their greatest power and standing. In later ages any traces of the Samavedic and Rigvedic Brahmanas disappeared . Most probably they had changed their residence or their lines came to an end. The following lines occur in Raja Harendra Narayan's Raja vansabali -

The Brahmanas living on the northern bank of the Lauhitya were all followers of the Yajurveda. They were all saddcharis and ritvijas (Vedic sacrificers).
