= Saraswat Brahmin =

Brahmin sub-caste of India

Saraswat Brahmins are a community of several Brahman castes spread over widely separated regions of the Indian subcontinent, spanning from Kashmir and Punjab in North India to Konkan and Malabar in South India, with Sindh and Gujarat in between. In places such as western and southern India, the claim of Brahminhood of some communities who claim to be Saraswat Brahmins is disputed. The word Saraswat is derived from the Rigvedic Sarasvati River.

== Classification ==
Saraswats Brahmins are classified under the Pancha Gauda Brahmin classification of the Brahmin community in India.

In Western and South India, along with the Chitpavan, Karhades (including Padhyes, Bhatt Prabhus), and Konkani-speaking Saraswat Brahmins are referred to as Konkani Brahmins, which denotes those Brahmin sub-castes of the Konkan coast which have a regional significance in Maharashtra and Goa.

=== Based on Veda and Vedanta ===
In Karnataka and Kerala, Majority of Gaud Saraswat Brahmins are followers of Madhvacharya, while the Chitrapur Saraswat Brahmins are Smarthas, followers of Adi Shankara. Writer Chandrakant Keni and former I.C.S officer V. N. Kudva say, "The majority of the Saraswats, including those in Goa, are now Vaishnavas".

== Origin ==
The Saraswat Brahmins originating in Balochistan were called sindhur and were considered a low caste. They have a legend of origin related to Lord Ramachandra (not the same as Parashurama), who could not find a priest in Balochistan and applied a Tilaka on the head of some Mleccha. Jürgen Schaflechner cites the historian Rowe who states that such "low ranking Brahmins" formed a symbiotic relationship with Vaishya castes such as Khatris, Lohanas, etc. who were trying to raise their varna status - which in turn would benefit the Saraswats as well. For this purpose, certain religious texts were written during the British Raj era.

Saraswats of western India claim to be part of the Saraswat brahmin community of the north based on the Sahyadri Khanda of Skanda Purana. As per the Purana, Parshurama brought Saraswats to Konkan. However, Sanskrit scholar Madhav Deshpande, Indologist and Sanskrit Scholar Stephan Hillyer Levitt and historian O'Hanlon consider the portion of the Sahyādrikhaṇḍa that describes Saraswats to be corrupted and recently interpolated by Saraswats themselves in order to improve their status.

The southward migration of Saraswat Brahmins is explained in the Skanda Purana. The Sayhadrikhand of Skandapurana narrates the founding myths of various Brahmin communities.In the text, Shiva narrates the following founding myths to Skanda: Parshurama brought Saraswatas from Tirhut to Konkan, settling them in the villages of Kelosi and Kusasthal. These settlers were "attractive, well-behaved, and skilled in every rite". The deities Shantadurga, Mangesh, Mhalsa, Nagesh and Mahalakshmi accompanied them to Konkan.

=== Scholarly interpretation ===
According to Rosalind O'Hanlon, the core of the text was likely written around the end of the 1st millennium, it contains stories about Brahmin village settlements that have fallen from virtue. The remaining text appears to have been written later, as it describes the Pancha Gauda and Pancha Dravida classification of Brahmins, which became popular during the 13th-14th centuries.

== History ==
=== Migration ===
Saraswats were spread over a wide area in northern part of the Indian subcontinent. One group lived in coastal Sindh and Gujarat, this group migrated to Bombay State after the partition of India in 1947. One group was found in pre-partition Punjab and Kashmir, these also have tended to migrate away from the part of Punjab located in Pakistan after 1947. Another branch known as Dakshinatraya Saraswat Brahmin are now found along the western coast of India.

=== Philosophy and literature ===
Saraswats have contributed to the fields of Sanskrit, Konkani, Marathi and Kannada literature and philosophy. All the mathadhipathis of Kashi Math, Gokarna Math, Kavale Math and Chitrapur Math without a single exception are from the Saraswat Brahmin community. The 17th-century Madhva Saraswat scholar, Sagara Ramacharya, authored the Konkanabhyudhaya.

Advaita saints such as Gaudapada, grand-teacher of the philosopher Shankaracharya; Narayana Tirtha, the first peetadhipathi of Gokarna Math and Yadavendra Tirtha, the first peetadhipathi of Kashi Math, are some of the prominent saints from the Saraswat Brahmin community.

== Society and culture ==
=== Northern India ===
==== Kashmir ====
In Kalhana's Rajatarangini (12th century CE), the Saraswats are mentioned as one of the five Pancha Gauda Brahmin communities residing to the north of the Vindhyas.

According to M. K. Kaw (2001), Kashmiri Pandits, a part of the larger Saraswat Brahmin community hold the highest social status in Kashmir. Based on the calendar used, they divided into two groups-Malmasi (who remained in the valley despite religious persecution) and Banmasi (who are said to have immigrated or re-immigrated under King Zain ul Abidin in the fifteenth century) The former follow the lunar calendar while latter who are in the majority follow the solar calendar. Walter Lawrence states that the Kashmiri Pandit community to be divided into the following classes - the Jotish (astrologer), the priestly class Guru or Bachabat and the Karkun (working class) that was employed in government service. Philosophers like Sureśvara, the first peetadhipathi of Sringeri Sharada Peetham, Mandana Mishra, were Kashmiri Saraswat Brahmins. and Parijnanashram I, was the first peetadhipathi of Chitrapur Math.

==== Punjab and Sindh ====
Mohyal Brahmins are a sub-caste of Saraswat Brahmins from the Punjab region, who are sometimes referred to as 'Warrior Brahmins'. Mohyal Brahmins stopped practising priestly duties.

A small minority of Mohyals also have an association with Shia Muslims because they helped Imam Hussain in the Battle of Karbala, these Mohyal Brahmnins are called Hussaini Brahmins.

=== Eastern India ===
In Gangetic belt mainly in Uttar Pradesh and Bihar, Saraswat Brahmins were landlords and priests. They follow Shakta tradition, Vaishnavism and Shaivism.

=== Western and Southern India ===
Here the Saraswat Brahmins are divided into three sub-groups, they are, Gaud Saraswat Brahmins, Chitrapur Saraswat Brahmins and Rajapur Saraswat Brahmins. Vaishnavas among them are followers of Kashi Math and Gokarna Math, while the Smarthas are followers of Kavale Math and Chitrapur Math.

==== Western India ====
The majority of Saraswats speak Konkani, one of the languages of the Indo-Aryan language family. The major dialects of Konkani used by Saraswats are Goan Konkani, Maharashtrian Konkani and Canarese Konkani.

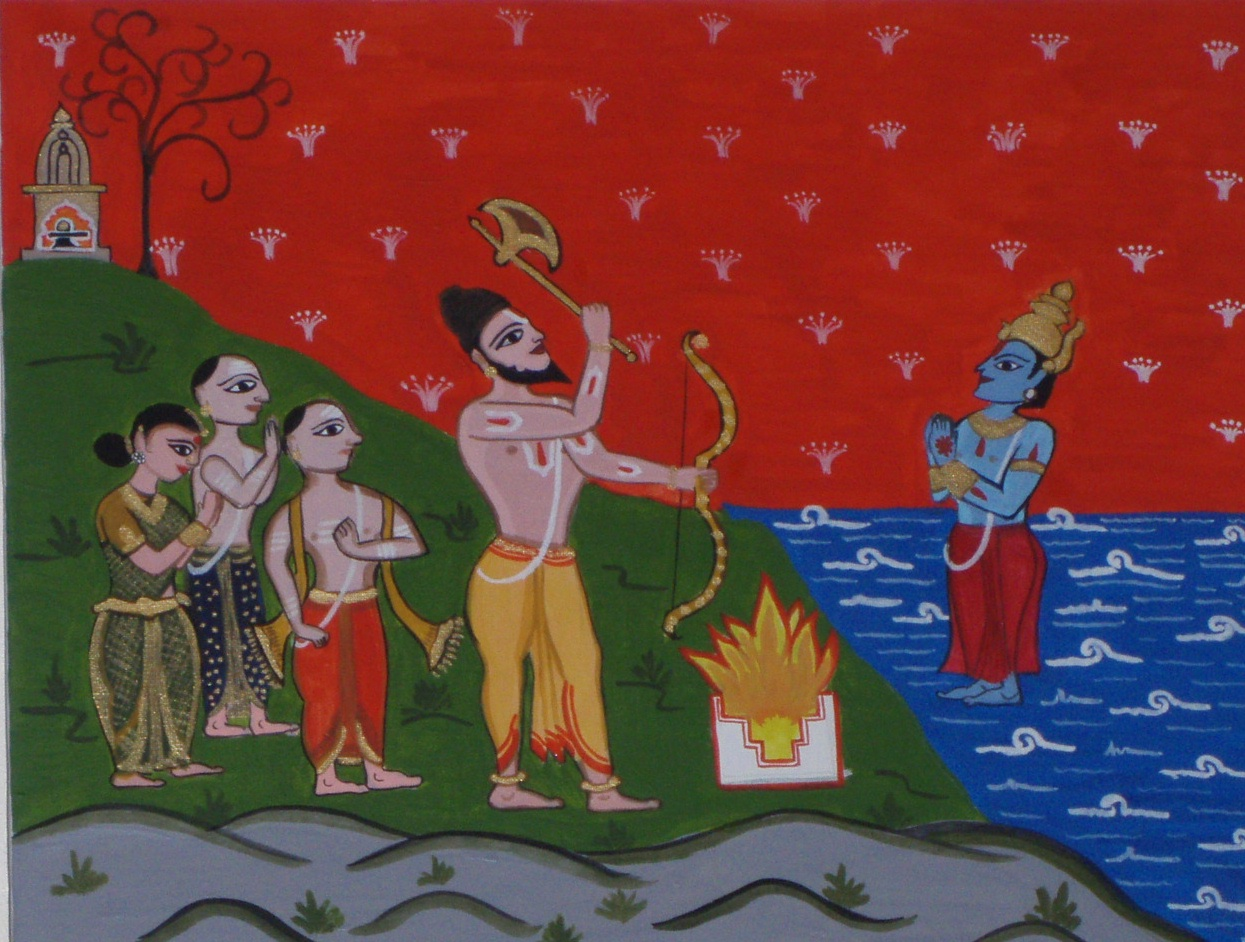
Parashurama with Saraswat Brahmin, commanding Varuna to make the seas recede in order to create the Konkan Region

Historian Sanjay Subrahmanyam states that Saraswats at "Basrur on the Kanara coast south of Goa" were a "caste of open status", which sometimes claimed to be Brahmins although they were associated with mercantile activity and called as "Chatins" from Chetti by the Portuguese. Moroccan explorer Ibn Battuta had also visited Basrur, which was considered "the great center of Saraswat trade", two centuries earlier than the Portuguese, but it did not interest him as much as it did the Portuguese.Chatins de Barcelor was the term used for the Saraswat community of merchants at Basrur in the time of Diogo do Couto, but the term Chatin acquired a pejorative meaning later. It is likely derived from the Tamil 'Chati', which is a suffix for many trading castes that were present on the southern side of the Godavari river.

The Saraswats and Gujarati Vanias in Goa, were involved not only in trade but also in tax related income. After the 1540s discrimination against non-Christians in Goa increased and there were mass conversions to Christianity. Despite this, between 1600 and 1670, about 80% of the tax farms or rendas were held by the Hindus, especially Saraswats. The prominent Saraswat merchants mentioned at this time, that is, early 1600s are Govinda, Pondya as well as the Kini and Nayaks. The rendas were on various items such as spices(pepper), cotton and silk cloths, food shops and duties on gold. Michael Pearson has given an example of members and relatives of a Saraswat Naik family to show that when a person successfully did a bidding for a renda from the government, he had to name some guarantors - who were usually his relatives or caste members.

The Saraswats also traded at the Vengurla and Raybag ports and acted as suppliers of rice and pepper that they imported from Kanara. In this context, they also dealt with the Dutch who has established a factory in the port of Vengurla. Scholars mention a certain P. Nayak who was a notable merchant in the 1670s.

Saraswat merchant families during the Portuguese rule of Goa also were involved in trade with Portuguese colonies around the globe including in the African slave trade. In the 19th century also, French slave merchants came to Goa and contacted the Portuguese and Saraswat Brahmins who sold them African slaves.

In Konkan, the Saraswat as well as the fishermen communities were traditionally traders as well as sailors. The reason for seafaring was that the land of Konkan suffered due to salinisation and unpredictable rains. This caused the Saraswats to look for livelihood outside of Konkan and they would often use the Arabian Sea for travelling for trade. Dabhol was the main Konkan port in 1600 to Hormutz and the traders traded with Socotra and Yemen but by 1700 Dabhol was ruined due to silting and sandbanks. Moreover, the cities with which the trading occurred had also declined.

During Shivaji's coronation, the ritual status of the Saraswats to be Brahmins was supported by Gaga Bhatt, a leading Brahmin from Benares.

Historically, in Maharashtra, Saraswats had served as low and medium level administrators under the Deccan Sultanates for generations. In the 18th century, the quasi-independent Shinde and the Holkar rulers of Malwa recruited Saraswats to fill their administrative positions. This made them wealthy holder of rights both in Maharashtra and Malwa during the eighteenth century. During the same period in Peshwa ruled areas, there was a continuation of filling of small number of administration post by the Saraswats. During the rule of the Chitpavan Brahmin Peshwas in the 18th century, Saraswat Brahmins was one of the communities against whom the Chitpavans conducted a social war which led to Gramanya (inter-caste dispute).

After the liberation of Goa from the Portuguese colonial rule in 1961, many Goan Saraswats opposed merger of Goa into Maharashtra.

The 19th century Konkani scholar Shenoi Goembab, and the 20th century multi-faceted Marathi scholar Purushottam Laxman Deshpande are some of the prominent scholars from the Saraswat Brahmin community.

==== Southern India ====
According to Nagendra Rao, the trading communities of Saraswats, Jews, Arabs, Komatis, Nawayath, etc. were active in south Kanara when the Portuguese arrived for trading in the 1500s. The items of trade were rice, pepper, ginger, etc. International trade already existed at the time in South Kanara and business existed with Malabar, Maldives, ports of the Red Sea. In Mangalore, Saraswats were part of the trading community when the Portuguese arrived to import saltpetre. The items from Mangalore were exported to Malabar, Goa, Surat, Bengal, Malacca, Maldives, Mecca, Aden, Congo, Hormuz and Ceylon.

Studies show that between 1500 and 1650, in Kanara, Saraswats and Nawayath were dominant in commerce with ports outside India but it was Mappila Muslims and Middle Eastern Muslims who dominated in Malabar.

The rulers in India encouraged Tobacco production from the mid-1600s because chewing, smoking and sniffing Tobacco gathered momentum in India. The Dutch extended cultivation in Kerala. Some towns in Kerala received support from the King of Cochin for tobacco cultivation. Here, the Saraswat Brahmin merchants such as Nayak, Kamat, etc. took up tobacco farming in the latter half of the seventeenth century and this resulted in major income for the King of Cochin.

According to some socialists due to the pescatarian diet of saraswats the claim of satkarmi brahminhood of saraswats was contested by local Brahmins but majority of saraswat Brahmins were Vegetarians, this was discussed during the coronation of shivaji where Gagabhatt gave verdict in favour of saraswat Brahmins, further during British era this matter reached court which resulted in court declaring saraswat Brahmins as Satkarmi Brahmins Sociologist and researcher Ramesh Bairy writes that "Saraswat claim to Brahminhood is still strongly under dispute, particularly in the coastal districts of Karnataka".

According to the sociologist, Gopa Sabharwal (2006), in Belgaum, Karnataka, "marriages between Saraswat and non-Saraswat Brahmins are on the increase though they were unheard of before, mainly because the Saraswats eat fish and occasionally meat, while all other Brahmins are vegetarians". According to sociologist Ramesh Bairy, even in 2010, in Karnataka, "at the level of the community as a whole, Brahmins may not be incensed at the Saraswat claim to Brahminhood. But a non-Saraswat Brahmin will not be keen on proposing marriage with a Saraswat family".

== Marriages ==
The Saraswat Brahmins are divided into various territorial endogamous groups, who did not intermarry.

== Diet ==
=== Kashmir valley ===
Kashmiri Pandits eat mutton and fish, but obey restrictions laid down by the shastras of not eating the meat of forbidden animals. Professor Frederick J. Simoons says according to some reports, Saraswat Brahmins from northern India also consume fish as part of their diet.

=== Maharashtra and Goa ===
In Goa and Konkan region, Saraswat Brahmins have both vegetarians and pescetarians among them, while in Maharashtra they are pescetarians.

=== Gujarat ===
In Gujarat, Saraswat Brahmins are pure vegetarians and do not even consume masur dal and garlic. They chiefly live on Bajri (millet), wheat roti (unleavened bread) with rice during lunch, and Khichdi (a mixture of rice and pulse) in the Dinner.

=== Southern India ===
In Karnataka, Saraswat Brahmins are mainly concentrated in the coastal Kanara region. The sub-groups among Saraswats are Gaud Saraswat Brahmins, Chitrapur Saraswat Brahmins and Rajapur Saraswat Brahmins are largely vegetarians. In Kerala, Rajapur Saraswat Brahmins and Gaud Saraswat Brahmins are chiefly vegetarians, but there are also pescetarians among them.

== See also ==
- Gaur Brahmins
