= Viswa Brahmin Diwas =

Annual event for the unity of Brahmin community

Vishwa Brahman Diwas विश्व ब्राह्मण दिवस
- Nickname: Brahman Gaurav Diwas
- Date: 1 June
- Frequency: Annually
- Country: International
- Inaugurated: 1 June 2021
- Participants: Brahmins community
- Leader: Acharya Chanakya
- Chanakya Jayanti ( Symbolic )

Viswa Brahmin Diwas is a Hindu celebration to commemorate the pride of Brahmin communities in the Hindu tradition. The translation of Viswa Brahmin Diwas is World Brahmin Day. It is celebrated on the occasion of the birth anniversary of the Indian philosopher cum diplomat Acharya Chanakya.

The celebration of the Viswa Brahmin Diwas symbolises the honouring the legacy of spiritual seekers, knowledge-bearers, and cultural custodians in the Indian subcontinent. They are considered as architects who have shaped the moral and intellectual fabric of the subcontinent. The celebration is seen as a tribute to the spiritual heritage of India.

== Background ==
In 2021, the Brahmin community organizations all over the world decided to celebrate the birth anniversary of Acharya Chanakya on the 1st June every year in the name of "Vishwa Brahman Diwas" to remember the contributions of the Brahmin community. The actual birth date of Acharya Chanakya is unknown so all the Brahmin organizations decided to organise Chanakya Janmotsav on 1 June as his symbolic birth anniversary. Acharya Chanakya is considered as the pride and ideal of Brahmin communities. He was an accomplished politician, diplomat and strategist as well as the author of Indian text Arthashastra. He is also called Kautilya because of his deep understanding of various subjects.

== Observances ==
On this day, the Brahmin community pays homage to their ancestors in their respective homes and remembers the Sanatana Culture and its importance and takes pledge that to maintain the ideals and greatness of the Sanatana Culture. Besides that, Parshuram Chalisa, Havan Yajna and Deepmala are performed in the houses of Brahmin families. Similarly, Hanuman Chalisa is recited collectively at community places.

Various Brahmin organizations on this day organize discussions on the policies of Acharya Chanakya, uniting the disintegrating India, saving humanity and ensuring welfare of all sections of society. Similarly, books of Chanakya Niti is gifted and distributed among respected personalities of the society. Some temples organize huge Mahabhandaras, in which devotees from other classes besides Brahmins receive offerings. Some people also celebrate International Brahmin Day by cutting a cake. Similarly some Brahmin organizations celebrate the day by organizing blood donations at hospitals or community health centres.
