= Pancha-Gauda =

One of the two major groupings of Brahmins

Pancha Gauda is one of the two major groupings of Brahmins in Hinduism, of which the other is Pancha-Dravida.

== In Rajatarangini ==
According to Kalhana's Rajatarangini (c. 12th century CE), the Pancha Gauda group includes the following five Brahmin communities, which according to the text, reside to the north of the Vindhyas in west-central India:

- Sarasvata
- Kanyakubja
- Gauda
- Utkala
- Maithila

== In the Sahyadri-khanda ==
The Sahyadri-khanda, considered a part of the Skanda Purana, also mentions the same classification as the Rajatarangini. For example, fragments of the Sahyadri-khanda, featured in Hemadri's Chatur-varga-chintamani (13th century), quote Shiva to provide this classification. The text identifies its heroes, the Shenvis, as Sarasvatas. In the text, Shiva also provides an alternative classification of Pancha Gaudas, stating that the ancient sages made these divisions:

- Trihotras
- Agnivaisyas
- Kanyakubjas
- Kanojyas
- Maitrayanas

== In the kaifiyats ==
The Maratha-era kaifiyats (bureaucratic records) of Deccan, which give an account of the society in the southern Maratha country, mention the following Brahmin communities as Pancha-Gaudas

- Kanoji Brahmins
- Kamrupi Brahmins
- Utkala Brahmins
- Maithil Brahmins
- Gurjara Brahmins

According to the kaifiyats, the Pancha Gaudas could be either Smarta, Vaishnavas or Bhagavats.
