= Kannada Brahmin =

Kannada-speaking Brahmin communities

Kannada Brahmins
ಕನ್ನಡ ಬ್ರಾಹ್ಮಣ

Regions with significant populations
- Karnataka; Tamil Nadu; Telangana; Kerala; Andhra Pradesh

Languages
- Kannada

Religion
- Hinduism

Related ethnic groups
- Kannadigas; Pancha-Dravida Brahmins

Kannada Brahmins or Carnatic Brahmins are Kannada-speaking Brahmins, primarily living in Karnataka, and also present in the states of Telangana, Andhra Pradesh, Kerala, and Tamil Nadu. They belong to one of three traditions: Smartism, Sadh Vaishnavism (Madhva Sampradaya), and Sri Vaishnavism, and are followers of Adi Shankara, Madhvacharya, and Ramanuja, respectively.

== Classification ==
Kannada Brahmins fall under the Pancha Dravida Brahmin classification of the Brahmin community in India. These Brahmins generally are further sub-divided into a number of gotras and the Veda Shakha, which professes to subscribe to the performance of the yajna and other rites. Another sub-division divides them those who follow the Apastamba Dharmasutra and Asvalayana Sutra. Adherents of the latter preponderate in the state.
