= Kanyakubja Brahmin =

Brahmin community

Regions with significant populations
- Uttar Pradesh • Madhya Pradesh • West Bengal • Chhattisgarh • Jharkhand • Bihar • Assam • Tripura

Languages
- Hindi • Kannauji • Awadhi • Bhojpuri • Bengali • other Indo-Aryan languages

Religion
- Hinduism

Related ethnic groups
- Saraswat Brahmins • Gauda Brahmins • Maithil Brahmins • Bengali Brahmins • Utkala Brahmins

Kanyakubja Brahmins are an endogamous Brahmin community mainly found in northern India. They are classified as one of the Pancha Gauda Brahmin communities.

== Origins ==
According to André Wink, the Kanyakubja Brahmins emerged as the highest ranking subcaste of Brahmins and are known to have migrated to and colonized many areas outside their homeland in Kannauj. In the process, they created a hierarchy of subdivisions and exceedingly complex rank differentiations that correlated their ritual purity and standing with their position within the emerging sacred landscape of early medieval India inversely to the distance separating them from their homeland.

The majority of the interviewees assert that the designation of the caste originates from the city of Kannauj, emphasizing that this name signifies a geographical association. The etymology of this caste is solely preserved through genealogies, oral traditions, mythical narratives, and proverbial accounts.

== Occupation ==
Some of the Kanyakubja Brahmins were priests, astronomers, astrologers, or teachers, while others chose the career of soldier. They formed the best fighting element in Awadh next only to Rajputs.

== Social status ==
They are considered to be the highest class of Brahmins throughout India since the rule of Pratihara dynasty over Kanauj, migrating to Bengal, Gujarat and other northern regions.

== Notable people ==
- Ravishankar Shukla, first chief minister of Madhya Pradesh
- Shyama Charan Shukla, former chief minister of Madhya Pradesh
- Suryakant Tripathi, Indian poet and novelist.
- Atal Bihari Vajpayee, former Prime Minister of India
