= Bhatt Prabhu =

Parabhu people
Total population
- Few hundreds

Regions with significant populations
- Primary populations in: Goa

Languages
- Konkani

Religion
- Hinduism

Related ethnic groups
- Konkani people, Brahmins, Indo-Aryans, Karhade, Padye, Chitpavan, Goud Saraswat Brahmin, Daivajna

The Bhatt Prabhu community belongs to the Panch Darvida category of Brahmins, and claims to be a sub-caste of the Karhade Brahmin community.

== History ==
It is said that certain Padye families were excommunicated for some reason during the 14th or 15th century, which led to the formation of a new community known as the Bhatt Prabhus. But unlike Padyes they did not migrate to any other state and chose to remain in Goa.

== Intercaste dispute and ritual status ==
Karhade and Chitpavan were regarded as inferior by Rigvedi Deshasthas, who refrained from interdining with them due to their perceived lower ritual status.Karhades who settled in Desh considered Padhyes, a subsection of Karhades as inferior.Padhyes were farmers and Khots.Deshasthas considered Chitpavans as inferior due to their menial origin.
