= Padye =

Brahmin community from Goa, India

Padhye people पाध्ये किंवा भट
Total population
- Few thousands (approx)

Regions with significant populations
- Primary populations in: Goa; Karnataka; Kerala; Populations in: United Kingdom; United States; Arab States

Languages
- Konkani, Marathi

Religion
- Hinduism

Related ethnic groups
- Konkani people, Brahmin, Indo-Aryans: Karhade; Bhatt Prabhu; Chitpavan; Goud Saraswat Brahmin; Daivajna

Padhye Brahmin community hails from Goa, they speak a unique dialect of Marathi known as "Bhati Bhasha".

== Origin and early history ==
Skanda Purana (Sahyadri Khanda) as well as Brahmanda Purana are very harsh towards Karhade Brahmins. According to Sahyadrikhanda, Karhades are fallen Brahmins from the polluted land of Karashtra, and made offerings to the wicked goddess Matrika. The text derives their name from the word Karashtra ("evil land"), as well as the words "donkey-bones" (khara-ashti), stating that they originated when some semen spilled on a heap of donkey bones.

The reference to Padye Brahmins is found in the section of Karahastrabrahmanotpatti of Sahyadrikhanda. It is commonly believed that Padye Brahmins are not different from the Karhades and are a section of Karhade Brahmins. However, even now Padye Brahmins have retained their identity.

== Origin of the word Padye ==
The name Padye is supposed to have its origin in the Sumerian word Patesi. Comparing Padye with some Sumerian word patesi was a hypothetical theory by Mr. Dhume , that he forgot that Upadhyaya , Chattopadhyay exist similar is Padhye . With due course of time, they seem to have undergone thorough Sanskritisation and have been included into Brahminic fourfold system and attained status that of a Brahmin (i.e. during the rule of Yadavas and Kadambas in Goa when they were given lands by the monarchs and the title of Deshapati (now corrupted as Dessai) was bestowed upon many of them).

== Later history and migration ==
The Padyes are from Goa and are believed to have migrated to Maharashtra, then returned to Goa a few centuries later. It is believed that the name Karhade comes from the place Karhatak (present day Karhad) in Maharashtra, where they lived. The Shiledars of Kolhapur conquered south Konkan and got these priests with them back to Goa.

== Later Brahminic classification ==
Padhyes later were included in to the Pancha Dravida group of Brahmins and are now commonly considered a sub-caste of the Karhade Brahmin community, though not historically. Padhyes belong to 13 Gotras and are predominantly Smarthas and worship different aspects of Shakti and Shiva.

== Intercaste dispute and ritual status ==
Karhade and Chitpavan were regarded as inferior by Rigvedi Deshasthas, who refrained from interdining with them due to their perceived lower ritual status.Karhades who settled in Desh considered Padhyes, a subsection of Karhades as inferior. Padhyes were farmers and Khots. Deshasthas considered Chitpavans as inferior due to their menial origin.

== Kuldevatas ==
Padhyes worship following deities as their Kuldevta

- Navadurga
- Vijayadurga
- Aryadurga
- Mahalasa
- Kamakshi
- Mahalakshmi
- Santeri
- Bhagavati

== See also ==
- Bhati Bhasha
- Bhatt Prabhu
