= Pancha-Dravida =

One of the two major groupings of Brahmins

Pancha Dravida (lit. 'Five Dravida' from Sanskrit: पंच pancha) is one of the two major groupings of Brahmins in Hinduism, of which the other is Pancha-Gauda.

== In Rajatarangini ==
Kalhana, in his Rajatarangini (c. 12th century CE), classifies the following five Brahmin communities as Pancha Dravida, stating that they reside to the south of the Vindhyas:

- Karnataka (Karnataka Brahmins)
- Tailanga (Telugu Brahmins)
- Dravida (Brahmins of Tamil Nadu and Kerala)
- Maharashtraka (Maharashtrian Brahmins)
- Gurjara (Gujarati, Marwari and Mewari Brahmins)

== In the Sahyādrikhaṇḍa ==
A fragment of the Sahyādrikhaṇḍa, featured in Hemadri's Chatur-varga-chintamani (13th century), quotes Shiva to name the following divisions of the Pancha Dravidas:

- Drāviḍa
- Tailaṅga
- Karnāṭa
- Madhyadeśa (identified with Mahārāṣṭra in variant readings)
- Gurjara

== In the kaifiyats ==
The Maratha-era kaifiyats (bureaucratic records) of Deccan, which give an account of the society in the southern Maratha country, mention the following Brahmin communities as Pancha Dravida:

- Andhra-Purva Desastha
- Dravida Desastha
- Karnataka Brahmins
- Desastha

The kafiyats classify the Gurjara Brahmins as Pancha Gauda. They also mention the following 16 sub-castes of the Pancha-Dravidas:

- Smarta
- Konkanastha
- Karhade
- Varkari
- Madhyandin
- Vanas
- Karnataka
- Shashtika
- Nandavamshika
- Srivaishnava Telanga
- Srivaishnava
- Pratham-Shakhikanva
- Kirvant
- Sihavasai
- Nurcher
- Shenavi
- Govalkonde
