= Karhade Brahmin =

Brahmin sub-caste from Maharashtra, India

Karhade Brahmins
Regions with significant populations
- Primary populations in Maharashtra

Languages
- Marathi and Konkani (Karhadi dialect)

Karhaḍe Brahmins (also spelled as Karada Brahmins or Karad Brahmins) are a Hindu Brahmin sub-caste mainly from the Indian state of Maharashtra, but are also distributed in the states of Goa, Karnataka and Madhya Pradesh.

== Based on Veda and Vedanta ==
Karhade Brahmins are essentially Rigvedi Brahmins who follow the Ashwalayana Sutra and belong to Shakala Shakha. Karhade Brahmins are divided into two groups based on the Vedanta they follow, the first of which follows the Advaita Vedanta of Adi Shankara and the second of which follows the Dvaita Vedanta of Madhvacharya. Hence, Karhade Brahmins have both Smarthas and Madhvas (also known as Bhagvats or Vaishnavas) among them. Like their Deshastha counterparts, traditionally the karhade allowed cross-cousin marriages.

Sub-division and other claims

There are three divisions of Karhade Brahmins - Karhade (from Desh), Padye and Bhatt Prabhu (from Konkan). "Padhye" was a further division of "Padye" - and were Khots or farmers. There are three sub-castes in Karhade Brahmans 1. Karhade 2. Padye and 3. Bhatt Prabhu. Padyes were found mostly in Ambuj province of Konkan . According to author Pran Nath Chopra, The Karhade Brahmins who were appointed as the priests came to be called as "Upadhyayas" which in due course became Padhye. Rosalind O’Hanlon mentions Padhye as a separate individual caste and denies it being a subcaste of Karhade.

== Origin ==
=== Origin and history ===
Skanda Purana (Sahyadri Khanda) as well as Brahmanda Purana are very harsh towards Karhade Brahmins. According to Sahyadri Khanda, Karhades are fallen Brahmins from the polluted land of Karashtra, and made offerings to the wicked goddess Matrika. The text derives their name from the word Karashtra ("evil land"), as well as the words "donkey-bones" (khara-ashti), stating that they originated when some semen spilled on a heap of donkey bones.

==== Scholarly interpretation ====
According to Rosalind O'Hanlon, the core of the text was likely written "before or around the end of the first millennium": it contains stories about Brahmin village settlements that have fallen from virtue. The remaining text appears to have been written later, as it describes the Pancha Gauda and Pancha Dravida classification of Brahmins, which became popular during the 13th-14th centuries.

German academic Alexander Henn, citing Stephan Hillyer Levitt and João Manuel Pacheco de Figueiredo, describes the Sahyadri-khanda as an apparently recently organised. Based on Levitt's work, he states that the earliest of these texts dates to the 5th century, and the latest to the 13th century. Madhav Deshpande believes that the motivation in writing this negative account in Sahyadri Khanda is suspect because it is a "pro-saraswat" text and the Brahmins of Maharashtra, i.e. Deshastha, Chitpavan and Karhade were unanimous in the rejection of the Brahmin claim of the Gaud Saraswat Brahmins. Deshpande considers it a "virulent anti-Karhāḍe tirade". Lewitt suggests that the transmission of the text was recently in Saraswat hands for some time. (Note: Although the quote uses the word 'saraswat', the context of the paper shows that he refers to Gaud Saraswat only and the source referred by the source for the cases is The History and Social Organization of the Gauḍa Sārasvata Brāhmanas of the West Coast of India(1970) by Wagle)

The Karhade Brahmins take their name from the town of Karad in Satara district, the sacred junction of the Koyna and Krishna. They migrated to the region between Malvan and Sangameshwar near the Konkan coast and made it their homeland. The Karhade section, though it takes its name from Karad, a place in the Deccan region, is found chiefly in the Konkan coast. Author Sandhya Gokhale says, "Karhade Brahmins are generally thought to be a branch of the Deshastha Rigvedis who immigrated from their home in Satara district to the southern part of Ratnagiri on the Konkan Coast, where they were principally settled".

== Demographics ==
Most Karhade Brahmins live in Maharashtra though a significant population exist in Goa, Karnataka, and cities outside Maharashtra such as Sagar and Indore, Gwalior and Jabalpur in present-day state of Madhya Pradesh. Ancestors of these people moved to these places during 18th century during the Maratha Empire period. A southern branch of the Karhade settled around the Udupi - Mangalore - Kasargod region of the Malabar coast and they are called the "Karadas” and share their traditions with Kerala Brahmins and the Brahmins of South Karnataka.

== Culture ==
=== Language ===
Marathi is the mother tongue of most of the Karhade Brahmins in Maharashtra.

=== Diet ===
Karhade Brahmins generally follow a vegetarian diet.

== Notable people ==
- Moropant Ramachandra Paradkar (1729–1794), Marathi poet who was the last among those classified by Marathi literary scholars as pandit (पंडित) poets.
- Balshastri Jambhekar (1810–1846), journalist and founder of Darpan, the first newspaper in the Marathi language.
- Govind Ballal Kher (Govind Pant Bundela) (1710 - 1760), general and trustee of Peshwa Bajirao I 's territories in Bundelkhand.
- Visaji Krushna Biniwale, Visaji Krushna Chinchalkar, popularly known as Visaji Pant Biniwale, was one of the leading generals of Peshwas in Northern India during 1759 to 1772. Peshwa Madhavrao I mainly sought his assistance in his attempt to restore Maratha Empire in the North after the defeat in the Battle of Panipat (1761).
- Rani Lakshmibai of Jhansi (1828–1858), one of the leaders of the Indian Rebellion of 1857.
- The Newalkars - military leaders under the Peshwa and later rulers of Jhansi.
- Govind Sakharam Sardesai (1865–1959), historian.
- Bhaskar Ramchandra Tambe (1874–1941), Marathi-language poet.
- Govind Ballabh Pant (10 September 1887 – 7 March 1961), Indian freedom fighter, one of the architects of modern India and first Chief Minister of Uttar Pradesh. Recipient of Bharat Ratna. His ancestors migrated from the coastal Konkan region centuries ago to Kumaon region in present-day Uttarakhand state.
- B. G. Kher (1888–1957), first Chief Minister of Bombay Presidency.
- Laxmanrao Kirloskar (1869 – 1956) was an Indian businessman. He is the founder of the Kirloskar Group.
- Shantanurao Laxmanrao Kirloskar (1903–1991), Kirloskar Group son of noted industrialist Laxmanrao Kirloskar.
- M. S. Golwalkar (1906–1973), Sarsanghachalak of the Hindu nationalist Rashtriya Swayamsevak Sangh.
- Jitendra Abhisheki (1929–1997) was an Indian vocalist, composer and scholar of Indian classical, semi-classical, and devotional music for in a Padye Karhade Brahmin family. While he distinguished himself in Hindustani music, he is also credited for the revival of the Marathi musical theatre in the 1960s.

== See also ==
- Deshastha Brahmin
- Chitpawan Brahmin
- Marathi people
