= Gaur Brahmins =

Group of Brahmin communities in India

Gaur Brahmin
Regions with significant populations
- Haryana • Rajasthan • Western Uttar Pradesh • Madhya Pradesh • Delhi

Languages
- Haryanvi • Rajasthani • Western Hindi

Religion
- Hinduism

Related ethnic groups
- Brahmins • Pancha Gauda • Garha

Gaur Brahmins (IPA: [ɡɔːɽ], also spelled Gor, Gour, Gaud or Gauda) are a community of Brahmins in India. They are one of the five Pancha Gauda Brahmin communities that live north of the Vindhyas.

== Demographics ==
Gaur Brahmins are most numerous in the western half of Northern India, particularly in the states of Haryana, Rajasthan, and western parts of Uttar Pradesh and Madhya Pradesh, but a significant number are present in other northern states of India also.

Brahmins, mostly Gaurs, have a significant population in Delhi, around 12% - 14%, larger than the combined population of Jats and Gujjars. They play a dominant role in the region's politics.

== Military ==
During World War I, Gaur Brahmins were recruited to regiments and companies of the British Indian Army, notably the 1st Brahmans and 3rd Brahmans.

== Social status ==
In places where Gaur Brahmins reside, Brahmins who are not of the Gaur community are often considered to have an inferior status.

== Notable people ==
=== Historical figures ===
- Bhai Almast – 16th-century religious figure
- Bhai Balu Hasna – 16th-century religious figure
- Khushal Singh Jamadar – 19th-century military and administrative officer
- Tej Singh – 19th-century military and politically leader
- Madan Mohan Malaviya – educationist and Indian independence activist

=== Artists ===
- Lakhmi Chand – poet, founder of Haryanvi Saang culture

== See also ==
- Forward Castes
- Gabr
