= Brahmin =

Varna in Hinduism, one of four castes

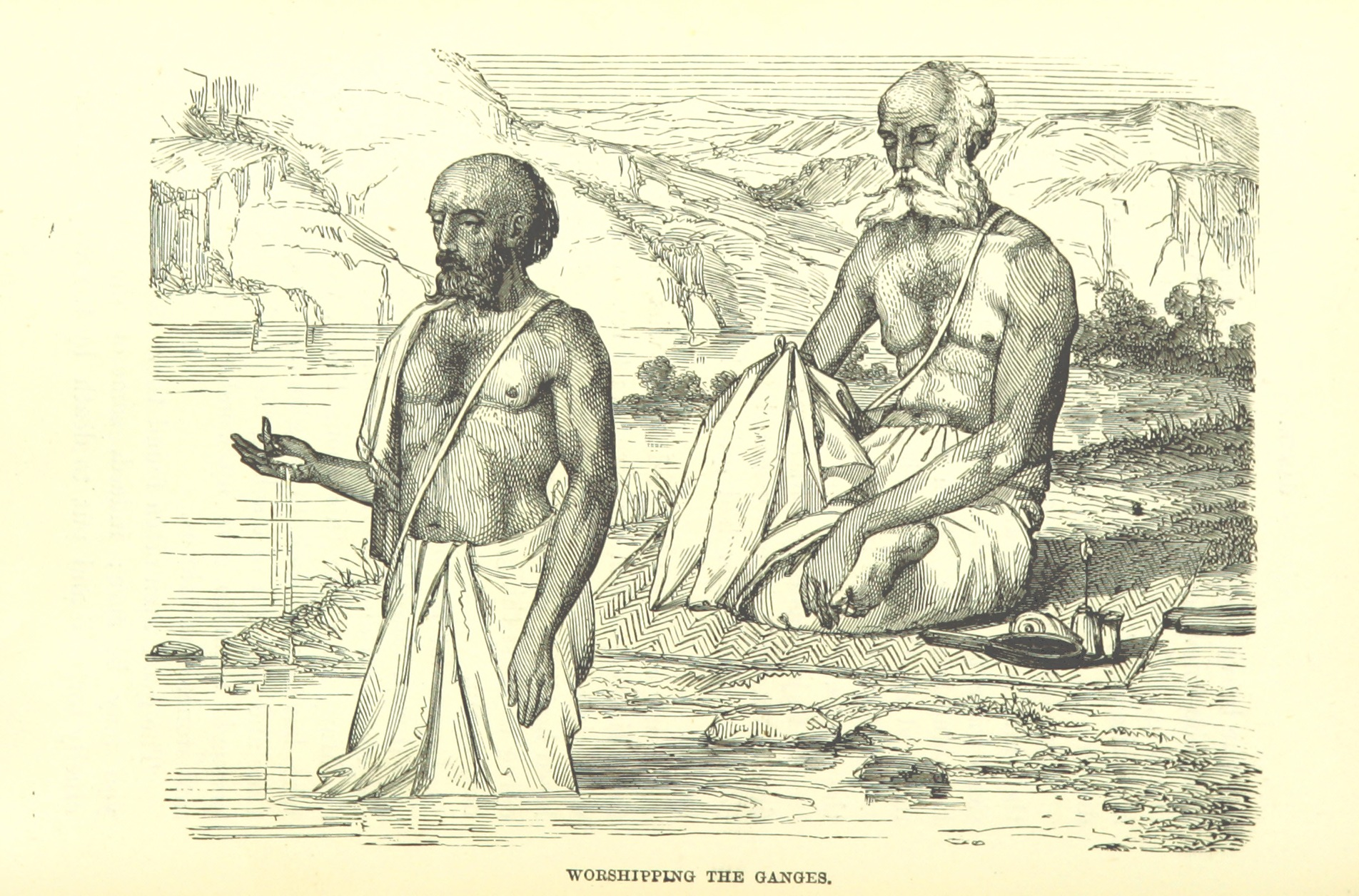
Brahmins worshipping river Ganges, The Land of Temples (India), 1882

Brahmin (/ˈbrɑːmɪn/; Sanskrit: ब्राह्मण, romanized: brāhmaṇa) is a varna (social class) within Hindu society. The other three varnas are the Kshatriya (rulers and warriors), Vaishya (traders, merchants, and farmers), and Shudra (labourers). The traditional occupation of Brahmins is that of priesthood (purohit, pandit, or pujari) at Hindu temples or at socio-religious ceremonies, and the performing of rite of passage rituals, such as solemnising a wedding with hymns and prayers. In the Bhagavad Gita, Varna is connected with a person's qualities, conduct and occupation rather than being defined by birth.

Traditionally, Brahmins are accorded the supreme ritual status of the four social classes, and they also served as spiritual teachers (guru or acharya). In practice, Indian texts suggest that some Brahmins historically also became agriculturalists, warriors, traders, and had also held other occupations in the Indian subcontinent. Within the jati (caste) system, Brahmins similarly occupy the highest position, though that is complicated by strict stratification even among Brahmins and historical attempts by other castes and sub-castes to challenge Brahminical dominance.

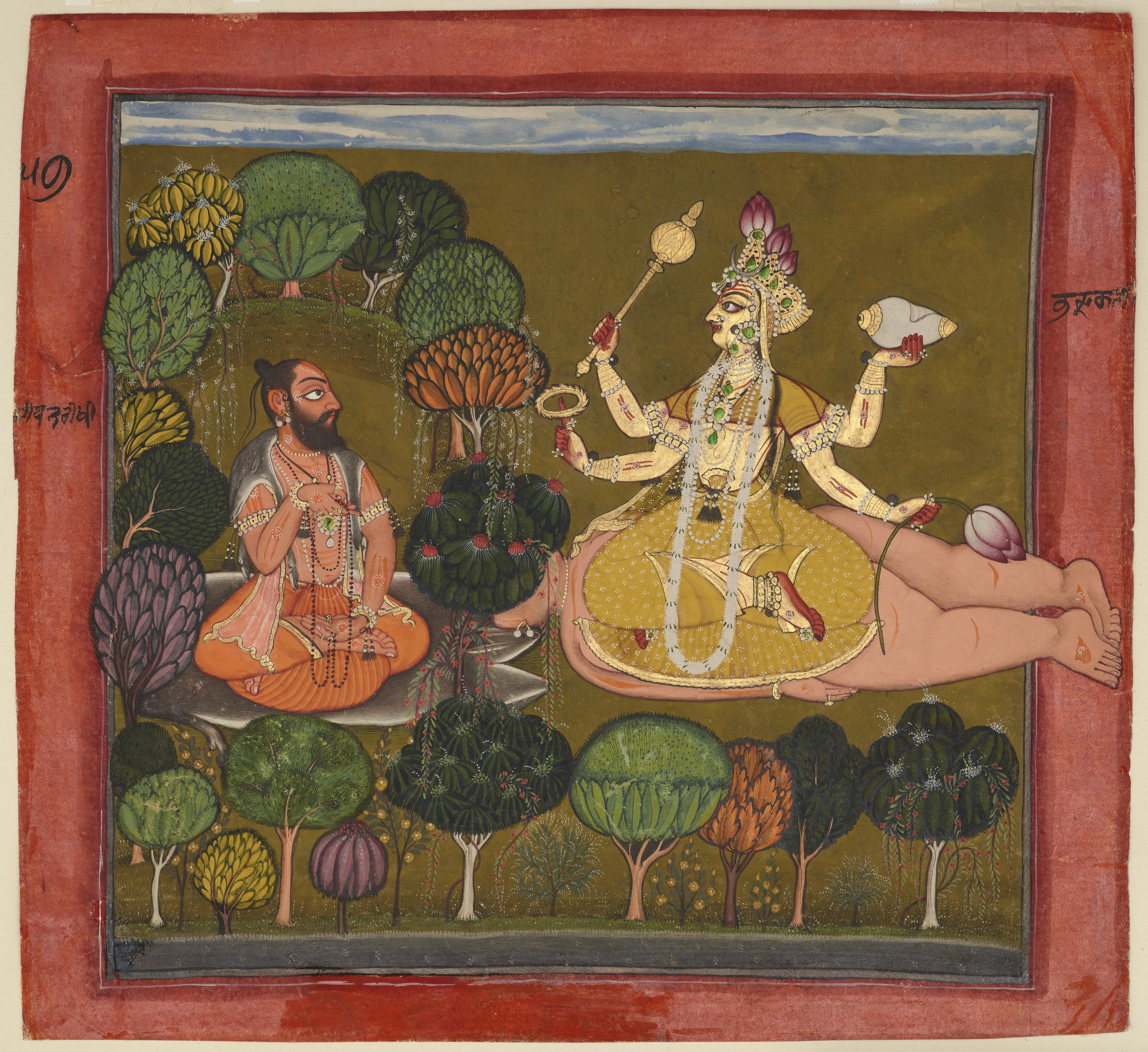
Vedic Brahmin Rishi worshipping Shakti

== Origin and history ==
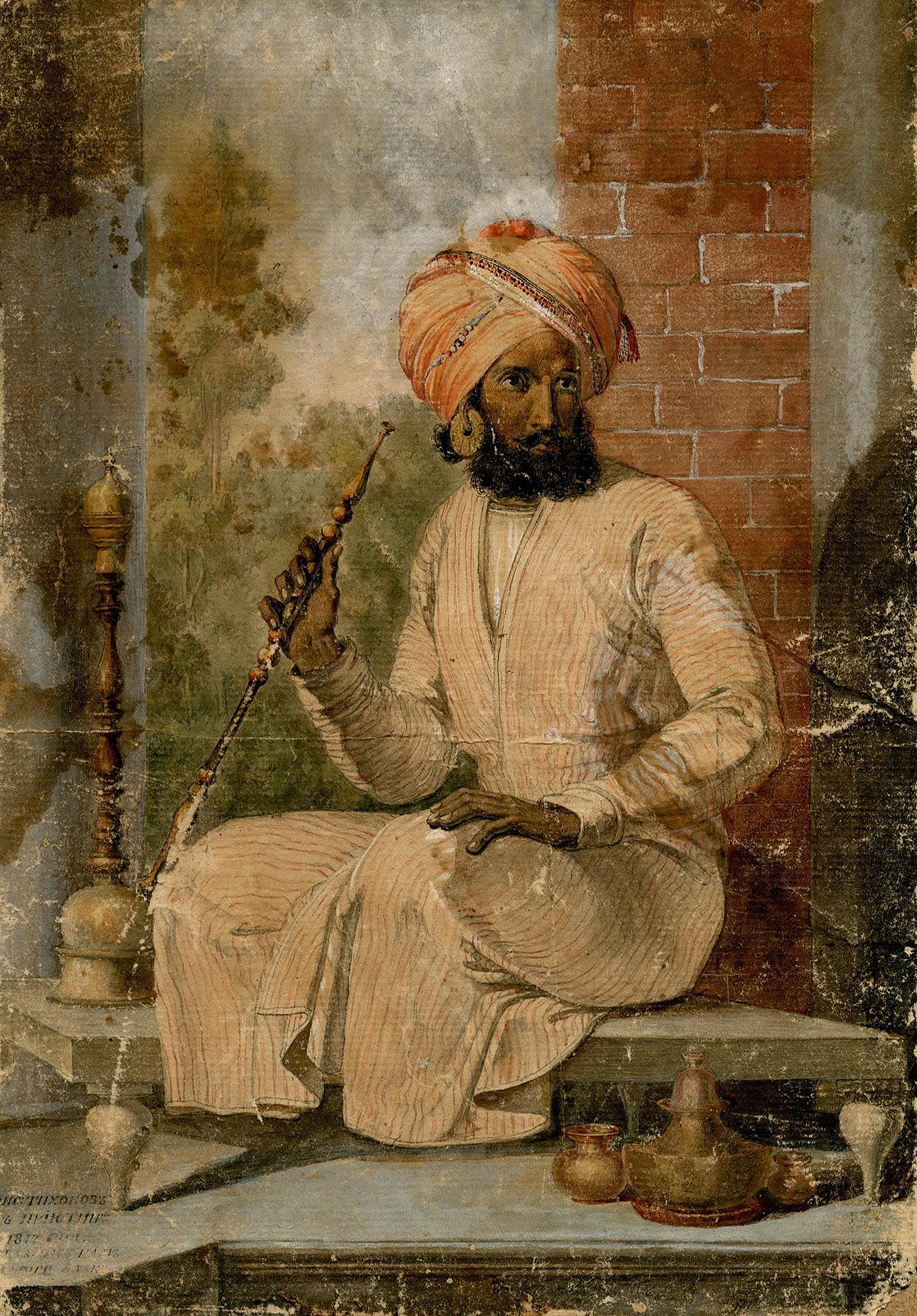
A Brahmin soldier

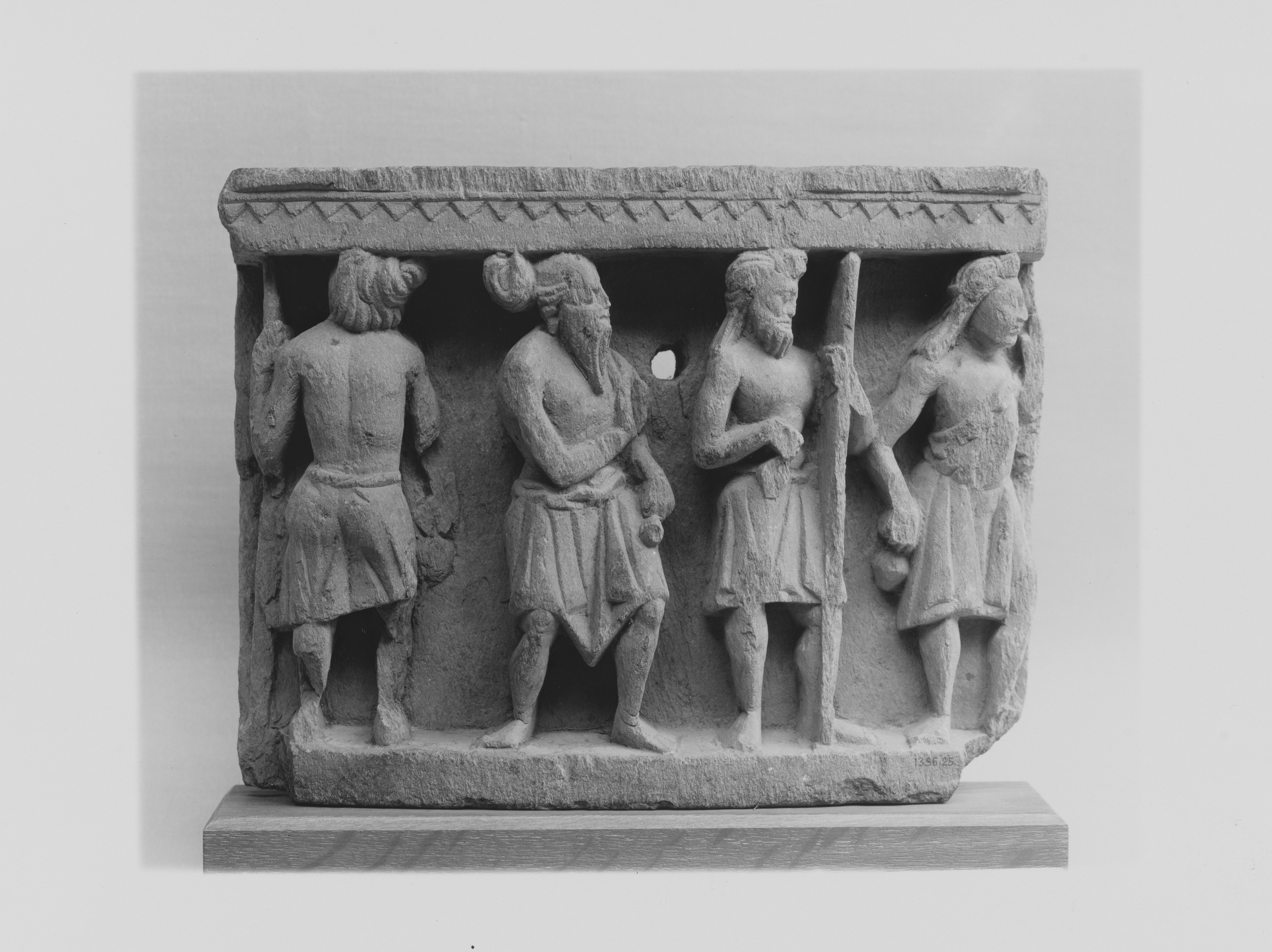
Four ascetic Brahmins from Gandhara, 2nd century

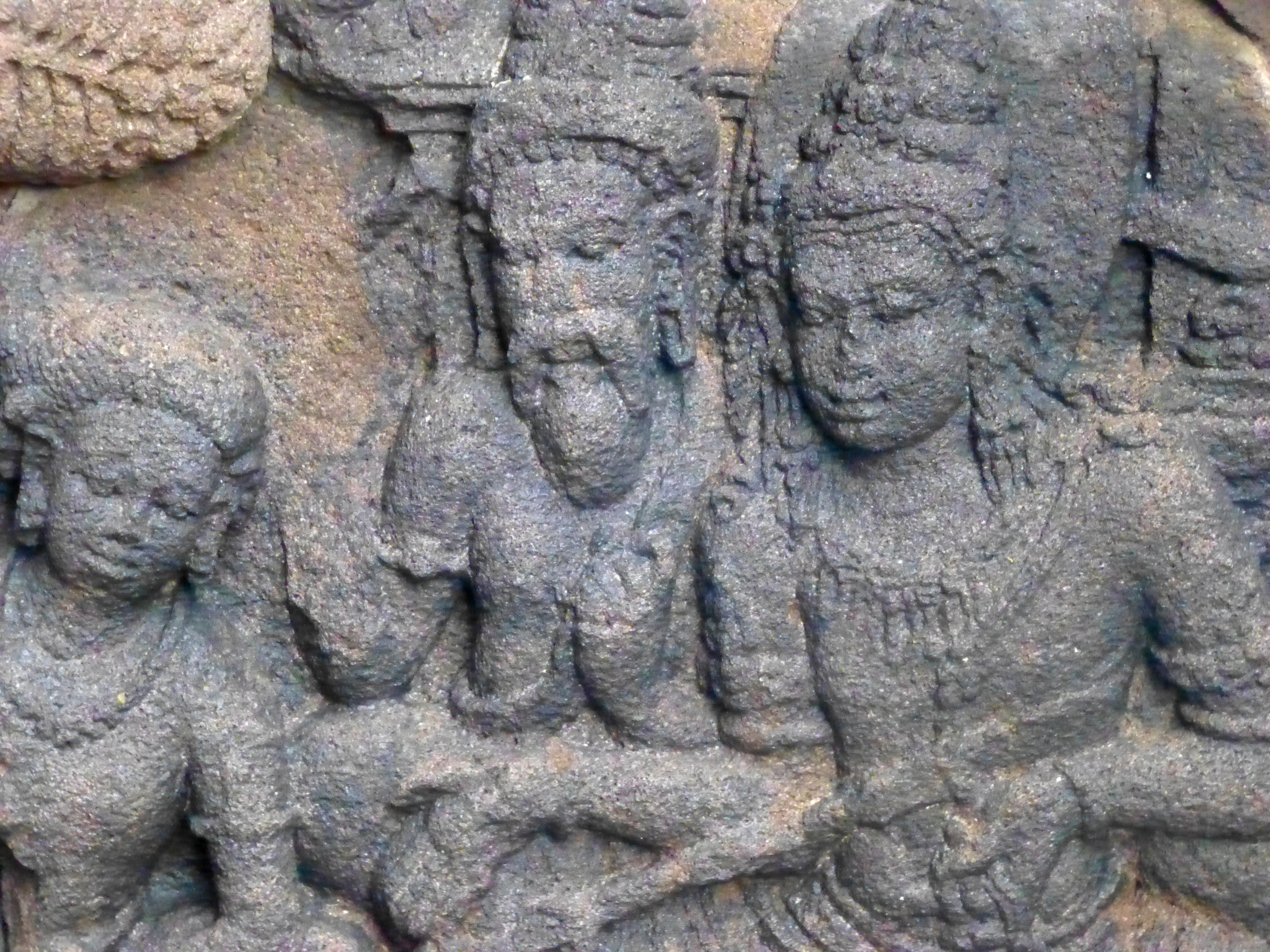
A Brahmin family, 9th century. Prambanan, Indonesia.

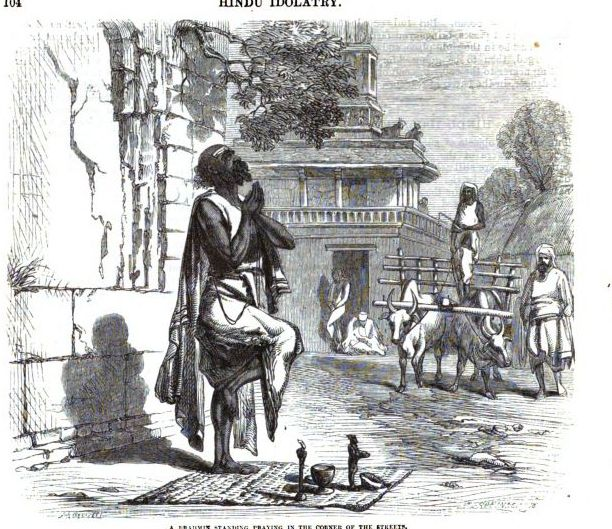
A Brahmin standing praying in the corner of the streets. India, 1863.

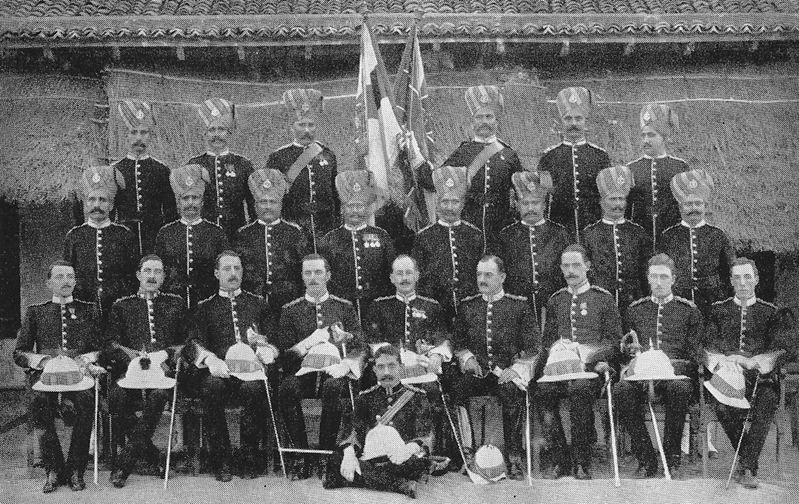
Brahmin Officers from 1st Brahmans Infantry Regiment

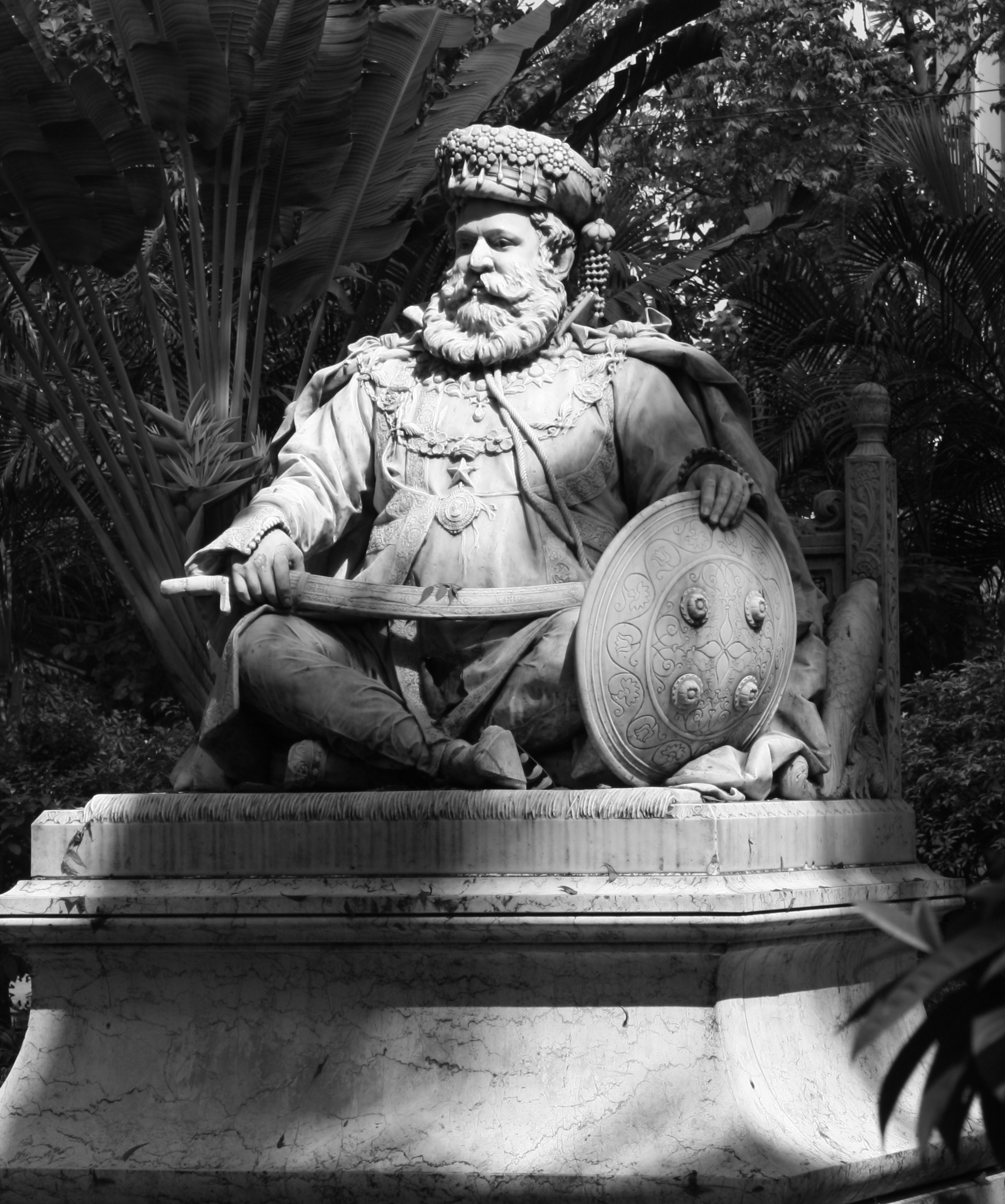
Maharaja Lakhmeshwar Singh statue

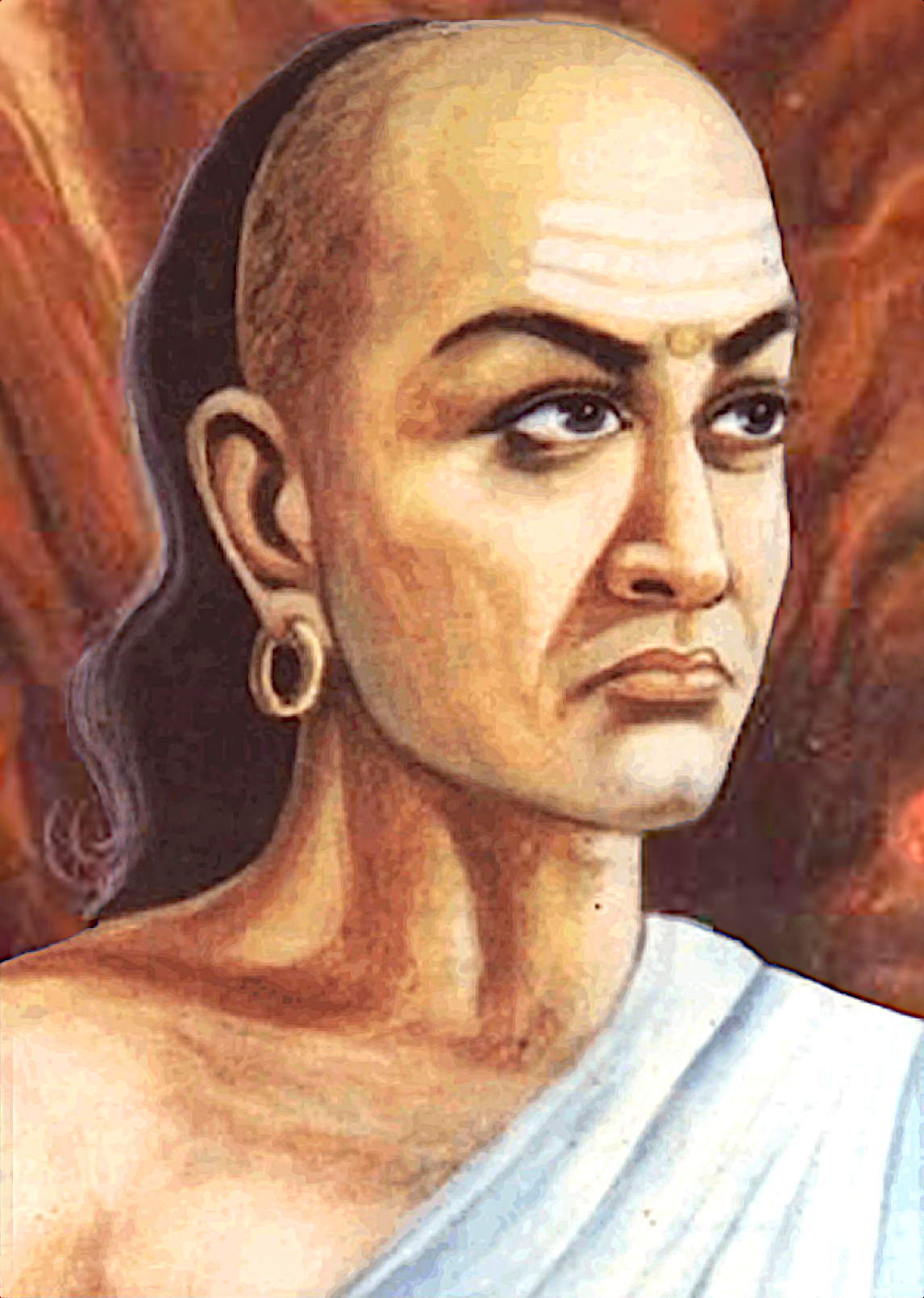
1915 depiction of ancient Indian economist and military strategist Chanakya

It seems likely that Kannauj and Madhyadesha was the place of origin of the majority of migrating Brahmins throughout the medieval centuries. Coming from Kannauj is a frequent claim among Brahmins in areas distant from Madhyadesha or the Ganges heartland.

=== Generic meaning of the term "Brahmin" ===
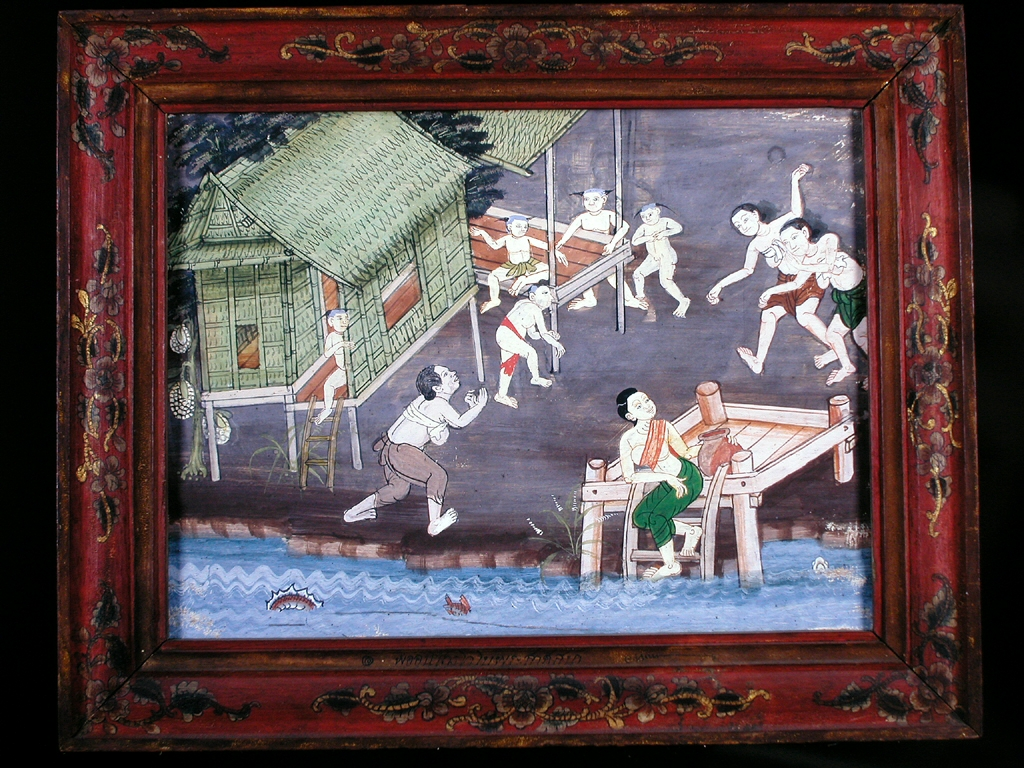
Buddhist painting of Brahmins from the 1800s, Thailand

The term Brahmin appears extensively in ancient and medieval sutras and commentary texts of Buddhism and Jainism. Modern scholars state that such usage of the term Brahmin in ancient texts does not imply a caste, but simply "masters" (experts), guardian, recluse, preacher or guide of any tradition. An alternate synonym for Brahmin in the Buddhist and other non-Hindu tradition is Mahano.

Strabo cites Megasthenes, highlighting two Indian philosophical schools Sramana and Brahmin:

Megasthenes makes a different division of the philosophers, saying that they are of two kinds, one of which he calls the Brachmanes, and the other the Sarmanes...

— Strabo XV. 1. 58-60

Patrick Olivelle states that both Buddhist and Brahmanical literature repeatedly define "Brahmin" not in terms of family of birth, but in terms of personal qualities. These virtues and characteristics mirror the values cherished in Hinduism during the Sannyasa stage of life, or the life of renunciation for spiritual pursuits. Brahmins, states Olivelle, were the social class from which most ascetics came. The term Brahmin in Indian texts has also signified someone who is good and virtuous, not just someone of priestly class.

=== Purusha sukta ===
The earliest inferred reference to "Brahmin" as a possible social class is in the Rigveda, occurs once, and the hymn is called Purusha Sukta. According to a hymn in Mandala 10, Rigveda 10.90.11-2, Brahmins are described as having emerged from the mouth of Purusha, being that part of the body from which words emerge.

The Purusha Sukta varna verse is now generally considered to have been inserted at a later date into the Vedic text, possibly as a charter myth. Stephanie Jamison and Joel Brereton, a professor of Sanskrit and Religious studies, state, "there is no evidence in the Rigveda for an elaborate, much-subdivided and overarching caste system", and "the varna system seems to be embryonic in the Rigveda and, both then and later, a social ideal rather than a social reality".

According to Vijay Nath, in the Markandeya Purana (250 CE), there are references to Brahmins who were born into the families of Raksasas. He posits that this is an indication that some Brahmins are immigrants and some are also mixed.

=== Gupta era ===
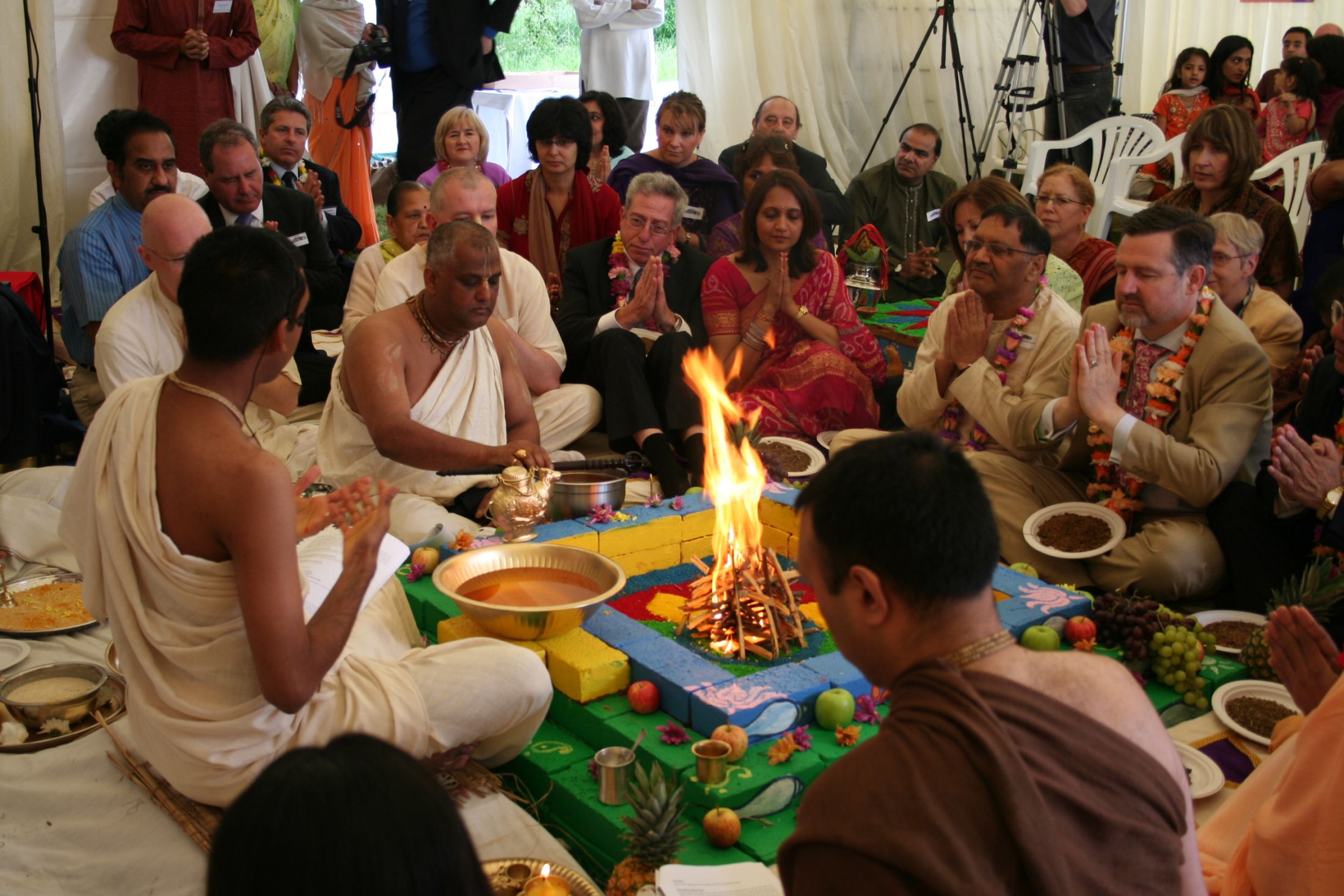
Brahmins in North West London, joined by Brent and Harrow politicians, in white dress performing the Bhumi Puja ritual yajna around fire

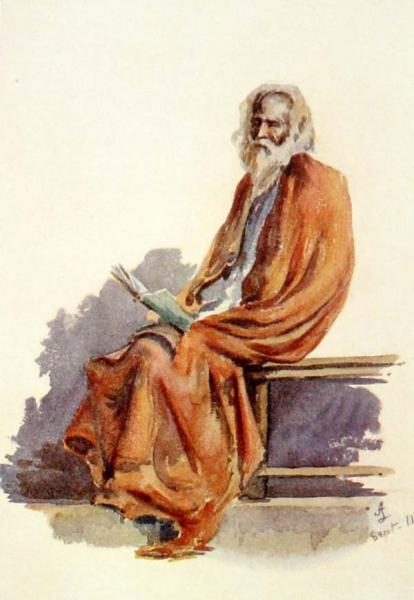
An ascetic from renunciation tradition (1914)

According to Abraham Eraly, "Brahmin as a varna hardly had any presence in historical records before the Gupta Empire era" (3rd century to 6th century CE), when Buddhism dominated the land. "No Brahmin, no sacrifice, no ritualistic act of any kind ever, even once, is referred to" in any Indian texts between third century BCE and the late first century CE. He also states that "The absence of literary and material evidence, however, does not mean that Brahmanical culture did not exist at that time, but only that it had no elite patronage and was largely confined to rural folk, and therefore went unrecorded in history". Their role as priests and repository of sacred knowledge, as well as their importance in the practice of Vedic Shrauta rituals, grew during the Gupta Empire era and thereafter.

However, the knowledge about actual history of Brahmins or other varnas of Hinduism in and after the first millennium is fragmentary and preliminary, with little that is from verifiable records or archaeological evidence, and much that is constructed from ahistorical Sanskrit works and fiction. Michael Witzel writes:

Current research in the area is fragmentary. The state of our knowledge of this fundamental subject is preliminary, at best. Most Sanskrit works are a-historic or, at least, not especially interested in presenting a chronological account of India's history. When we actually encounter history, such as in Rajatarangini or in the Gopalavamsavali of Nepal, the texts do not deal with brahmins in great detail.

=== Role in the bhakti movement and involvement in social reform ===
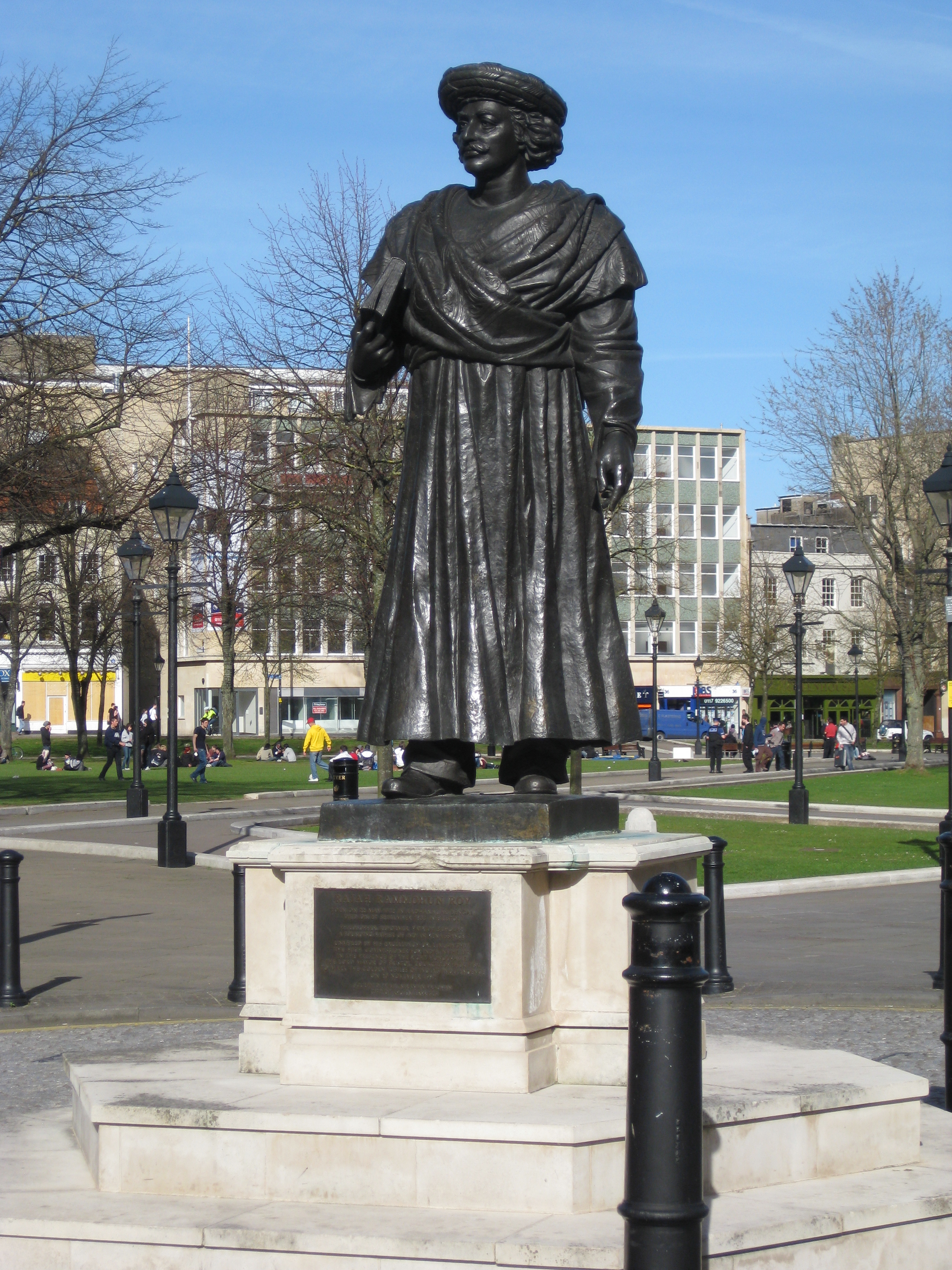
Raja Ram Mohan Roy, a Brahmin, who founded Brahmo Samaj

Many of the prominent thinkers and earliest champions of the Bhakti movement were Brahmins, a movement that encouraged a direct relationship of an individual with a personal god. Among the many Brahmins who nurtured the Bhakti movement were Ramanuja, Nimbarka, Vallabha and Madhvacharya of Vaishnavism, Ramananda, another devotional poet sant. Born in a Brahmin family, Ramananda welcomed everyone to spiritual pursuits without discriminating anyone by gender, class, caste or religion (such as Muslims). He composed his spiritual message in poems, using widely spoken vernacular language rather than Sanskrit, to make it widely accessible. The Hindu tradition recognises him as the founder of the Hindu Ramanandi Sampradaya, the largest monastic renunciant community in Asia in modern times.

Other medieval era Brahmins who led spiritual movements without social or gender discrimination included Andal (9th-century female poet), Basava (12th-century Lingayatism), Dnyaneshwar (13th-century Bhakti poet), Vallabha Acharya (16th-century Vaishnava poet), Chaitanya Mahaprabhu (14th-century Vaishnava saint) were among others.

Many 18th and 19th century Brahmins are credited with religious movements that criticised idolatry. For example, the Brahmins Raja Ram Mohan Roy led Brahmo Samaj and Dayananda Saraswati led the Arya Samaj.

== Role in society ==
=== Vedic duties ===
The Dharmasutra and Dharmashastra texts of Hinduism describe the expectations, duties and role of Brahmins.

According to Kulkarni, the Grhya-sutras state that Yajna, Adhyayana (studying the vedas and teaching), dana pratigraha (accepting and giving gifts) are the "peculiar duties and privileges of brahmins". John Bussanich states that the ethical precepts set for Brahmins, in ancient Indian texts, are similar to Greek virtue-ethics, that "Manu's dharmic Brahmin can be compared to Aristotle's man of practical wisdom", and that "the virtuous Brahmin is not unlike the Platonic-Aristotelian philosopher" with the difference that the latter was not sacerdotal.

The Brahmins were expected to perform all six Vedic duties as opposed to other twice-borns who performed three.

Vedic duties of twice-born Varnas
	Adhyayana (Study Vedas)	Yajana (performing sacrifice for one's own benefit)	Dāna (Giving Gifts)	Adhyāpana (Teaching Vedas)	Yājana (Acting as Priest for sacrifice)	Pratigraha (accepting gifts)
Brāhmaṇa	✓	✓	✓	✓	✓	✓
Kṣatriya	✓	✓	✓	No	No	No
Vaiśya	✓	✓	✓	No	No	No

=== Actual occupations ===
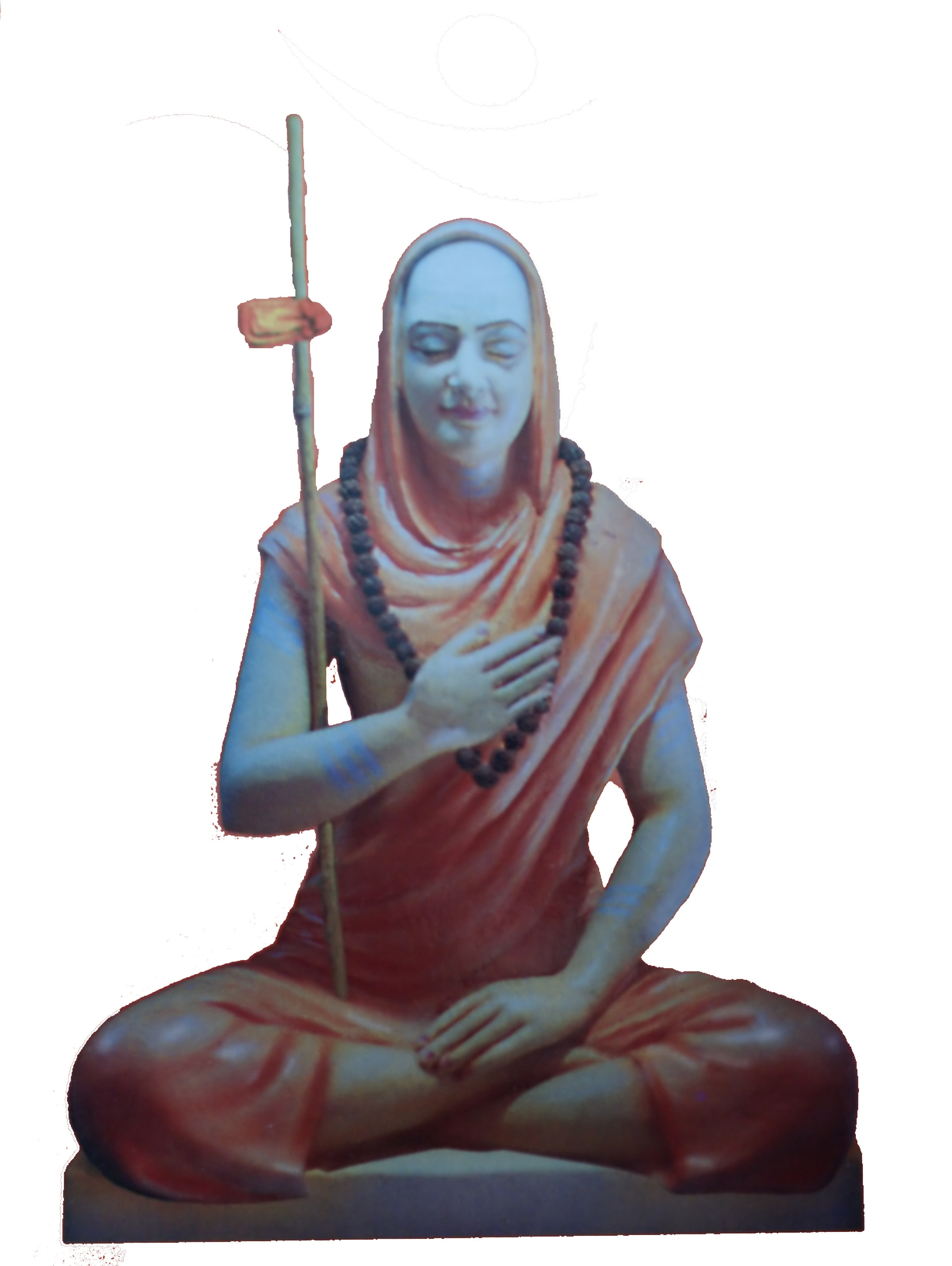
Gaudapadacharya, a proponent of Advaita Vedanta, was born into a Brahmin family. His disciple, Adi Shankara, is credited with unifying and establishing the main currents of thought in Hinduism.

Historical records, state scholars, suggest that Brahmin varna was not limited to a particular status or priest and the teaching profession. Chanakya, a Brahmin born in 375 BCE, was an ancient Indian polymath who was active as a teacher, author, strategist, philosopher, economist, jurist, and royal advisor, who assisted the first Mauryan emperor Chandragupta Maurya in his rise to power and is widely credited for having played an important role in the establishment of the Maurya Empire. Historical records from mid 1st millennium CE and later, suggest Brahmins were agriculturalists and warriors in medieval India, quite often instead of as exception. Donkin and other scholars state that Hoysala Empire records frequently mention Brahmin merchants who "carried on trade in horses, elephants and pearls" and transported goods throughout medieval India before the 14th-century.

The Pāli Canon depicts Brahmins as the most prestigious and elite non-Buddhist figures. They mention them parading their learning. The Pali Canon and other Buddhist texts such as the Jataka Tales also record the livelihood of Brahmins to have included being farmers, handicraft workers and artisans such as carpentry and architecture. Buddhist sources extensively attest, state Greg Bailey and Ian Mabbett, that Brahmins were "supporting themselves not by religious practice, but employment in all manner of secular occupations", in the classical period of India. Some of the Brahmin occupations mentioned in the Buddhist texts such as Jatakas and Sutta Nipata are very lowly. The Dharmasutras too mention Brahmin farmers.

According to Haidar and Sardar, unlike the Mughal Empire in Northern India, Brahmins figured prominently in the administration of Deccan sultanates. Under Golconda Sultanate Telugu Niyogi Brahmins served in many different roles such as accountants, ministers, in the revenue administration, and in the judicial service. The Deccan sultanates also heavily recruited Marathi Brahmins at different levels of their administration. During the days of Maratha Empire in the 17th and 18th century, the occupation of Marathi Brahmins ranged from being state administrators, being warriors to being de facto rulers as Peshwa. After the collapse of Maratha empire, Brahmins in Maharashtra region were quick to take advantage of opportunities opened up by the new British rulers. They were the first community to take up Western education and therefore dominated lower level of British administration in the 19th century. Similarly, the Tamil Brahmins were also quick to take up English education during British colonial rule and dominate government service and law.

Eric Bellman states that during the Islamic Mughal Empire era Brahmins served as advisers to the Mughals, later to the British Raj. The East India Company also recruited sepoys (soldiers) from the Brahmin communities of Bihar and Awadh (in the present day Uttar Pradesh) for the Bengal army. Many Brahmins, in other parts of South Asia lived like other varna, engaged in all sorts of professions. Among Nepalese Hindus, for example, Niels Gutschow and Axel Michaels report the actual observed professions of Brahmins from 18th- to early 20th-century included being temple priests, ministers, merchants, farmers, potters, masons, carpenters, coppersmiths, stone workers, barbers, and gardeners, among others.

Other 20th-century surveys, such as in the state of Uttar Pradesh, recorded that the primary occupation of almost all Brahmin families surveyed was neither priestly nor Vedas-related, but like other varnas, ranged from crop farming (80 per cent of Brahmins), dairy, service, labour such as cooking, and other occupations. The survey reported that the Brahmin families involved in agriculture as their primary occupation in modern times plough the land themselves, many supplementing their income by selling their labour services to other farmers.

== Stratification among Brahmins ==
According to Kalhana's Rajatarangini (12th cent. CE) and Sahyadrikhanda (5th–13th cent. CE) of Skandapurana, Brahmins are broadly classified into two groups based on geography. The northern Pancha Gauda group comprises five Brahmin communities, as mentioned in the text, residing north of the Vindhya mountain range. Historically, the Vindhya mountain range formed the southern boundary of the Āryāvarta, the territory of the ancient Indo-Aryan peoples, and Gauda has territorial, ethnographic and linguistic connotations. Linguistically, the term "Gauda" refers to the Sanskrit-derived languages of northern India. The Pancha Gauda Brahmins are:

- Sarasvata
- Kanyakubja
- Gauda
- Utkala
- Maithila

Subcastes of Gaur Brahmins are:

- Sanadhya
- Paliwal

Subcastes of Kanyakubja Brahmins are:

- Jujhatiya Brahmin
- Saryupareen Brahmin
- Bengali Kulin Brahmin
- Anavil Brahmins ( Though they are generally not accepted as Brahmins)
- Khas Brahmins – Nepali Bahuns

The Pancha Dravida Brahmins reside to the south of the Vindhya mountain range. The term "Dravida" too has territorial, linguistic and ethnological connotations, referring to southern India, the Dravidian people, and to the Dravidian languages of southern India. The Pancha Dravida Brahmins are:

- Karnataka (Karnataka Brahmins)
- Tailanga (Telugu Brahmins)
- Dravida (Brahmins of Tamil Nadu and Kerala)
- Maharashtraka (Maharashtrian Brahmins)
- Gurjara (Gujarati)

== Outside the Indian subcontinent ==
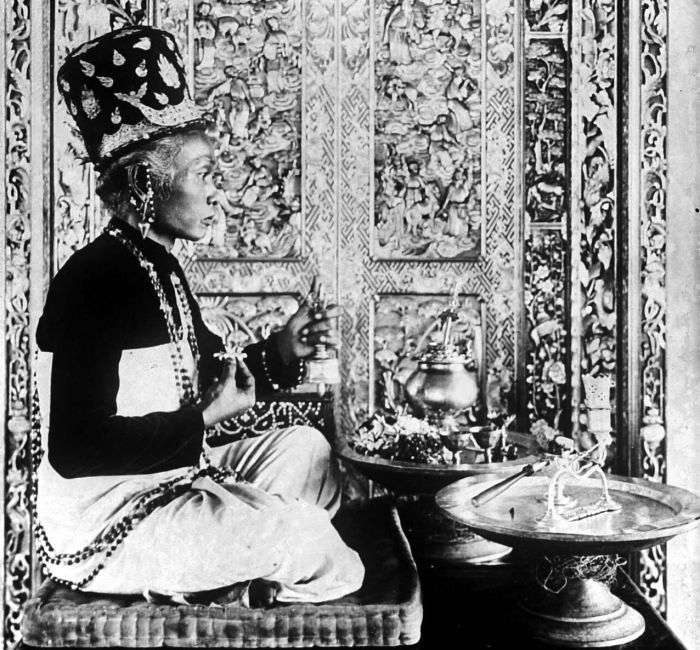
Among the Hindus of Bali, Indonesia, Brahmins are called Pedandas. The role of Brahmin priests, called Sulinggih, has been open to both genders since medieval times. A Hindu Brahmin priestess is shown above.

Some Brahmins formed an influential group in Burmese Buddhist kingdoms in 18th- and 19th-century. The court Brahmins were locally called Punna. During the Konbaung dynasty, Buddhist kings relied on their court Brahmins to consecrate them to kingship in elaborate ceremonies, and to help resolve political questions. This role of Hindu Brahmins in a Buddhist kingdom, states Leider, may have been because Hindu texts provide guidelines for such social rituals and political ceremonies, while Buddhist texts do not.

The Brahmins were also consulted in the transmission, development and maintenance of law and justice system outside India. Hindu Dharmasastras, particularly Manusmriti written by the Prajapati Manu, states Anthony Reid, were "greatly honored in Burma (Myanmar), Siam (Thailand), Cambodia and Java-Bali (Indonesia) as the defining documents of law and order, which kings were obliged to uphold. They were copied, translated and incorporated into local law code, with strict adherence to the original text in Burma and Siam, and a stronger tendency to adapt to local needs in Java (Indonesia)".

The mythical origins of Cambodia are credited to a Brahmin prince named Kaundinya, who arrived by sea, married a Naga princess living in the flooded lands. Kaudinya founded Kambuja-desa, or Kambuja (transliterated to Kampuchea or Cambodia). Kaundinya introduced Hinduism, particularly Brahma, Vishnu, Shiva and Harihara (half Vishnu, half Shiva), and these ideas grew in southeast Asia in the 1st millennium CE.

The Chams Balamon (Hindu Brahmin Chams) form a majority of the Cham population in Vietnam.

Brahmins have been part of the Royal tradition of Thailand, particularly for the consecration and to mark annual land fertility rituals of Buddhist kings. A small Brahmanical temple Devasathan, established in 1784 by King Rama I of Thailand, has been managed by ethnically Thai Brahmins ever since. The temple hosts Phra Phikhanesuan (Ganesha), Phra Narai (Narayana, Vishnu), Phra Itsuan (Shiva), Uma, Brahma, Indra (Sakka) and other Hindu deities. The tradition asserts that the Thai Brahmins have roots in Hindu holy city of Varanasi and southern state of Tamil Nadu, go by the title Pandita, and the various annual rites and state ceremonies they conduct has been a blend of Buddhist and Hindu rituals. The coronation ceremony of the Thai king is almost entirely conducted by the royal Brahmins.

== Demographics ==
Percentage of Brahmins in each state. Data is from recent caste censuses. 16–20% 12–16% 9–12% 4–8% 1–4% 0–1%

The last caste census, conducted by the government of British Raj, was in the year 1931. Out of the total population 27 crores (270 millions) of the undivided India, Brahmins were over 1.5 crores (15 millions) in population.

According to 2007 reports, Brahmins in India are about 5% of its total population, and back then were numbering 56 million.

The Himalayan states of Uttarakhand (20%) and Himachal Pradesh (14%) have the highest percentage of Brahmin population relative to respective state's total Hindus, followed by Delhi (12%), Jammu and Kashmir (11%), Uttar Pradesh (10%), in other states the Brahmins being less than 10% of the population, the lowest being in the southern states of Andhra Pradesh, Tamil Nadu and Kerala, where they form 1%.

According to the Center for the Study of Developing Societies, in 2004 about 65% of Brahmin households in India earned less than $100 a month compared to 89% of Scheduled Tribes, 91% of Scheduled Castes and 86% of Muslims.

== See also ==
- Viswa Brahman Diwas
- Vedic priesthood
- Brahmavarta
- List of Brahmins
- List of Brahmin dynasties and states
- 1st Brahman Regiment and 3rd Brahman Regiment
- Brahmin Tamil
- Historical Vedic religion

== Sources ==
- Narasimhacharya, Ramanujapuram (1999). The Buddha-Dhamma, Or, the Life and Teachings of the Buddha. Asian Educational Services.
