= British Colonial Auxiliary Forces =

Non-army military forces of the British Empire

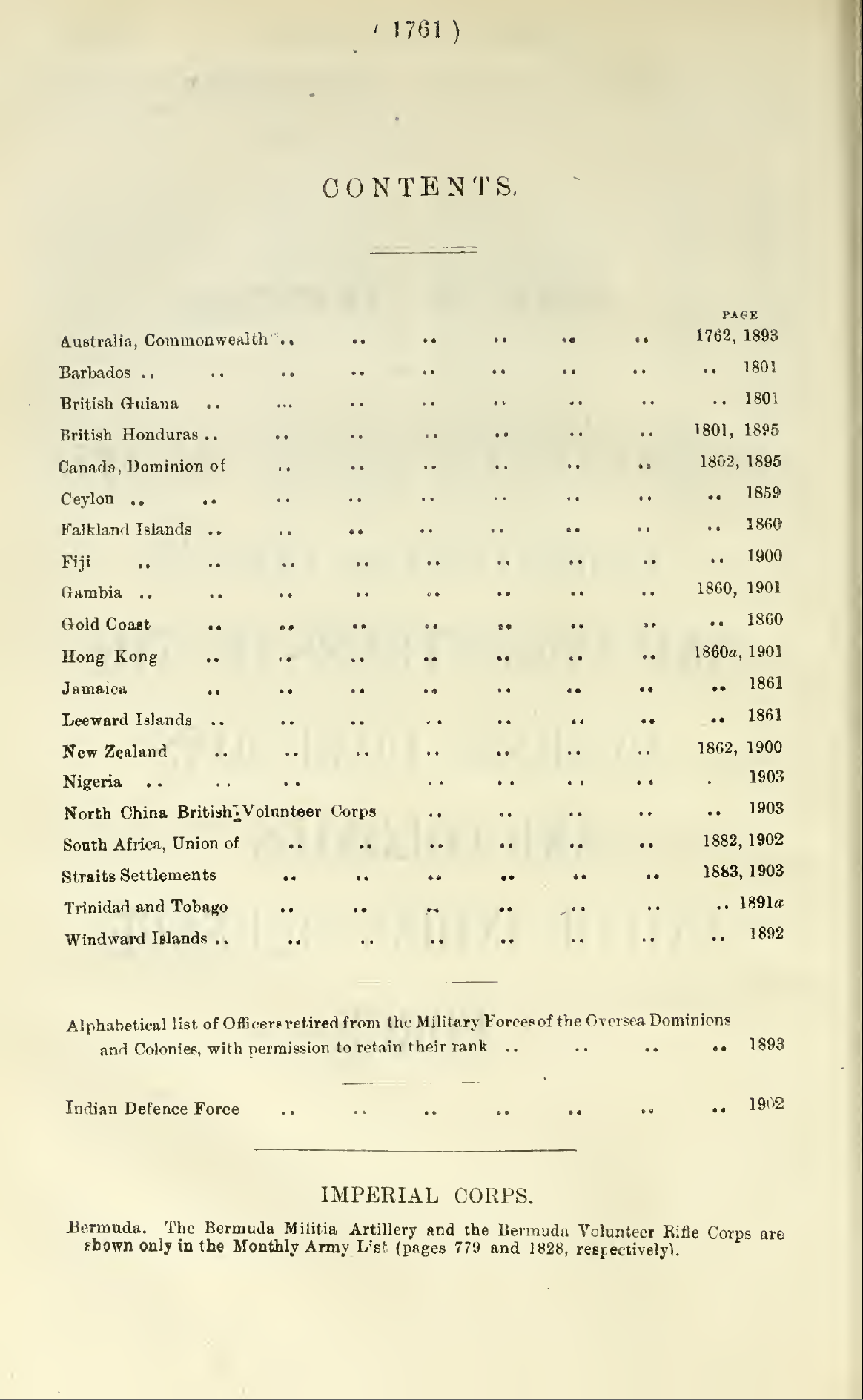
1919 Quarter Four "Army List" Contents page for Oversea Forces

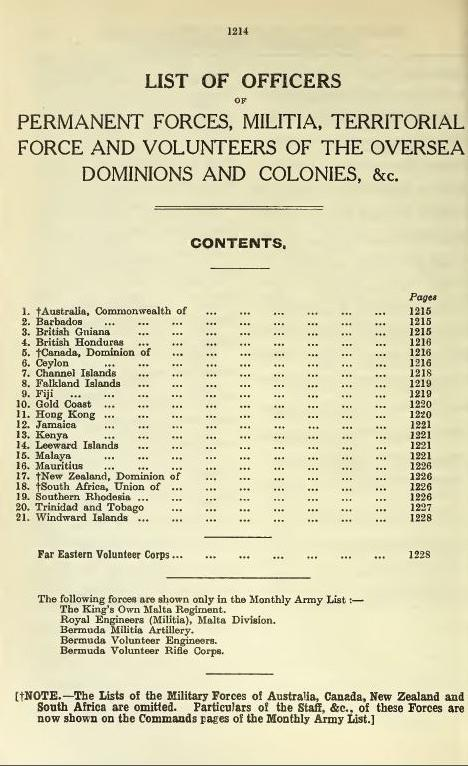
1939 Army List, Dominion and Colonial Regiments index

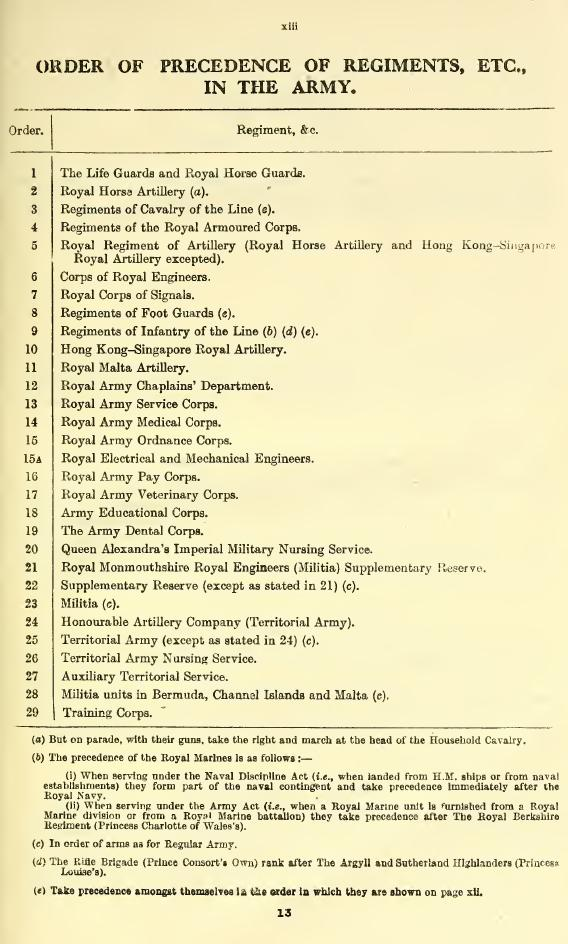
1945 Army List, Order of Precedence of the British Army, with auxiliary units omitted

The British Colonial Auxiliary Forces were the various military forces (each composed of one or more units or corps) of Britain's colonial empire which were not considered part of the British Army proper. Most were part-time units, and they were the colonial equivalents of the "Home" (ie., "British Isles") Auxiliary Forces. Both Colonial and Home Auxiliary Forces were originally referred to as "Reserve Forces" (until the formation of the Regular Reserve of the British Army caused confusion) and (due to their being tasked purely with home defence, so that their personnel could not be sent overseas on expeditionary service unless they specially volunteered for this) as "Local Forces" and "Home Defence Forces" or "Defence Forces". A small number of colonial reserve units (such as the Militia, Volunteer and Territorial units of Bermuda) were funded by the War Office as parts of the British Army and hence were not auxiliary forces. A small number of regular military units (such as the Royal West African Frontier Force) were also raised in the colonies and not funded by the War Office (and were organised under the Colonial Office), and these were also considered auxiliary to the British Army. Other regular colonial units, notably the West India Regiment, were funded by the War Office as parts of the British Army. The Corps of Colonial Marines was funded by the Admiralty as part of the regular naval service, and was not an auxiliary.

== Definition ==
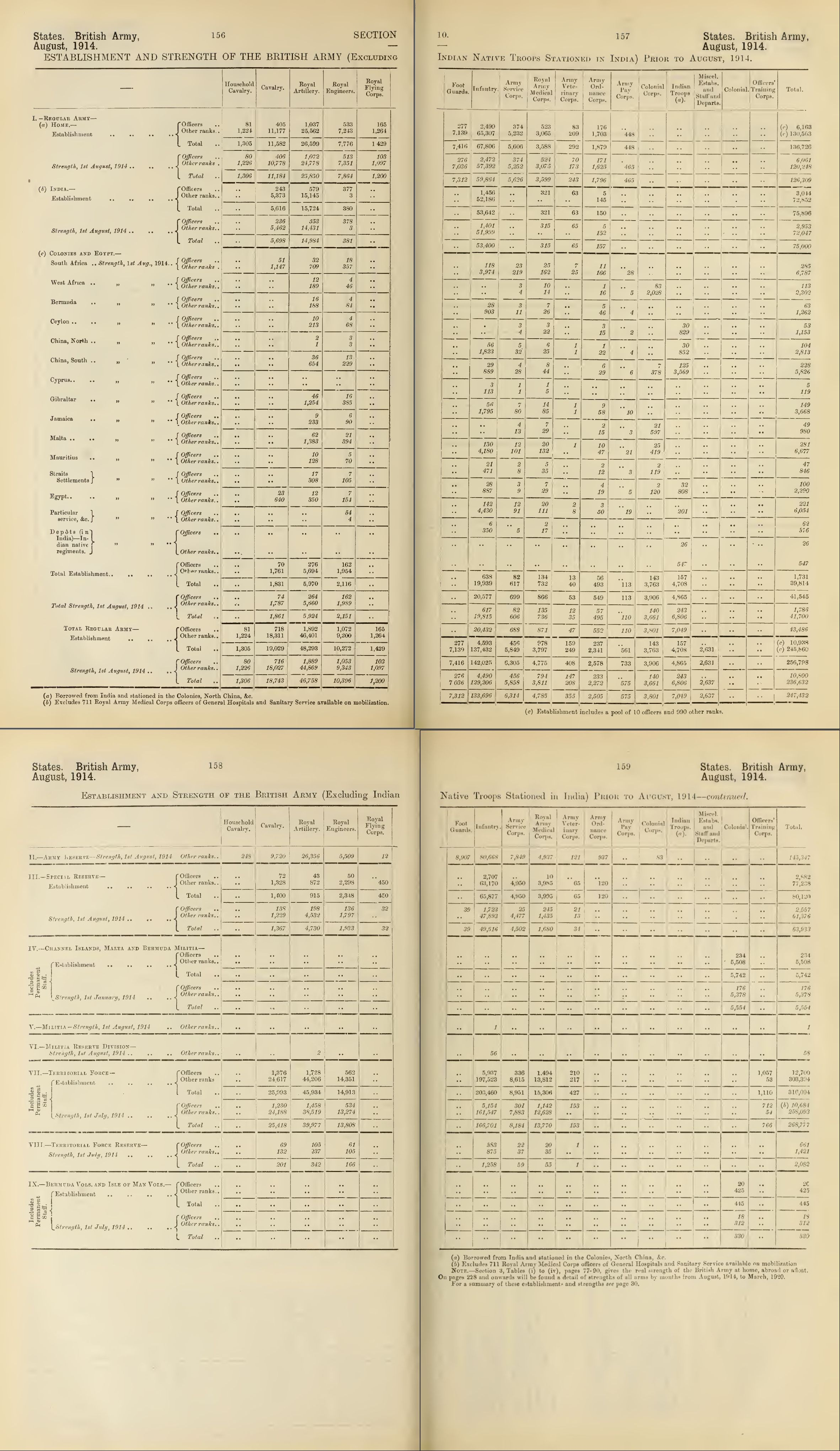
Establishment and Strength of the British Army (excluding Indian native troops stationed in India) prior to August, 1914.

Whether a British ("Home" or "Colonial") military unit or corps was considered part of the British Army was ultimately decided by whether it received Army funds from the War Office. Within and without the British Isles, the British military (referring to land, rather than naval, components of the British armed forces) by the end of the Napoleonic Wars included two regular forces (employed in the garrisoning and defence of the British Isles, other parts of the British Empire, and deploying to foreign countries as required): the Ordnance Military Corps (including the Royal Artillery, Royal Engineers, and Royal Sappers and Miners), administered and funded under the Board of Ordnance, and the British Army (mostly composed of cavalry and infantry regiments), administered and funded under the War Office.

Most were Home corps and units (i.e. those depoted and recruited in the British Isles, wherever they might be deployed), though some were raised in colonies. The regular forces also included at various times, usually in particular locations, invalid, fencible, and other units, utilised primarily for garrison or defensive duties. Some regular forces raised in colonies, such as those grouped in the Royal West African Frontier Force, were funded only by the Colonial Office or local governments and were therefore not considered part of the British Army. Additional to the regular military forces, the British military also included various reserve forces. The main ones by the time of the Napoleonic Wars included the Militia (or Constitutional Force, composed of infantry regiments), mounted Yeomanry, and the Volunteer Force, although there were various others at different times and places.

The Militia system was duplicated in many colonies, many of which would also raise volunteer units. These reserve forces were under the control of local authorities (the lords lieutenant in the British Isles and the governors in the colonies, in their separate offices of commanders-in-chief; normally, neither lords lieutenant nor colonial governors had any authority over regular forces in their territories) and were locally funded. After the conclusion of the Napoleonic Wars and the American War of 1812, the British Government slashed defence spending and downsized the regular forces, disbanding the fencibles (most of which units had been raised in Scotland due to the lack of Militia there in the 18th century, as a result of fears of rebellion), disbanding the Volunteer Force in the British Isles, and allowing the Militia there to become a paper tiger. The Yeomanry was maintained as a back-up to the constabulary in maintaining law and order.

In the 1850s, the Crimean War highlighted the problems of British military organisation, leading to the abolishment of the Board of Ordnance, with its military corps and previously civilian departments of transportation, stores, etc. being absorbed by the British Army. The Indian Mutiny led to the abolishment of the East India Company, with the India Office taking over administration of India. The company's military forces were split, the white units being absorbed into the British Army and the native ones forming the Indian Army.

The British Army saw significant change through the latter half of the century. The British Army Regular Reserve was formed in the 1850s, following which, to avoid confusion, the Reserve Forces were generally referred to as the Auxiliary Forces (i.e., auxiliary to, but not part of, the British Army) or as the Local Forces (as they were originally all for home defence). With the threat of invasion by France, the Reserve Forces in the British Isles were also re-organised throughout the latter half of the 19th century, into the first decade of the 20th century. The Militia was re-organised as a voluntary force from the 1850s, and the Volunteer Force restored as a permanent part of the peacetime military establishment. Both now included units other than infantry. These changes were copied to some degree in the colonial Reserve Forces. From the 1870s, administration and funding of the Auxiliary Forces in the British Isles passed from the lords lieutenant to the War Office and their units were increasingly integrated into British Army units (new infantry regiments, for example, being formed to include two regular battalions, with one or more Militia battalions and one or more Volunteer Force battalions, all bearing the same regimental name). Although the Auxiliary forces remained organised as, and nominally, separate forces (until the Territorial Army was renamed the British Army Reserve in 2014), their being funded by the War Office meant they were also considered parts of the British Army. Outside the British Isles, the funding of auxiliary forces remained largely with the local governments.

The first colonial units established in the British Empire were militia formations in England's American colonies (specifically in the Colony of Virginia, settled in 1607, and Bermuda, which was settled by the shipwreck of the Sea Venture in 1609, becoming an extension of Virginia in 1612). By the Victorian era, the colonial auxiliary military forces generally followed the pattern of the auxiliary military forces of the British Isles. There were also British military units, separate from those of the British Army (such as the West India Regiments and the Canadian Regiment of Fencible Infantry) that were raised and recruited in colonies, such as the Permanent Active Militia of the Province of Canada. These units consisted of professional soldiers. They supplied a reserve force either to be called up in wartime to reinforce regular British Army garrisons for home defence, or in some cases were entirely responsible for home defence. Many units, however, took part in active campaigns outside of the role of home defence in various conflicts the British Empire was involved in, including the two world wars.

Some of the reserve colonial units, especially in the strategically important imperial fortress colonies (consisting of Halifax, Gibraltar, Bermuda and Malta), were funded by the War Department out of Army Funds and considered part of the British Army (for example, the Bermuda Militia Artillery was grouped with the Royal Artillery and the Bermuda Volunteer Engineers with the Royal Engineers in the official Army Lists, which also listed the Bermuda Volunteer Rifle Corps and Bermuda Militia Infantry officers as part of the British Army, whereas most colonial units were listed separately or did not appear at all), whereas others that did not receive Army Funds were considered auxiliaries (British military units, but not part of the British Army).

Many colonial units started out as auxiliaries and later became regular units and forerunners to the current militaries of those colonies which have become politically independent. While most of the units listed here were army units, colonial marines were raised at various times, as were colonial naval and air force reserve units.

n 2020, the Cayman Islands Regiment and Turks and Caicos Islands Regiment were raised, joining the four already extant British Overseas Territories regiments (not including cadet corps): the Royal Bermuda Regiment (not an auxiliary); the Royal Gibraltar Regiment (not an auxiliary); the Falkland Islands Defence Force; and the Royal Montserrat Defence Force.

== In Africa ==
=== Africa ===
- King's African Rifles garrisoned the East African colonies of Nyasaland, Kenya, Uganda and British Somaliland.
- Royal West African Frontier Force garrisoned the West African colonies of Nigeria, Gold Coast, Sierra Leone and Gambia.

=== High Commission Territories ===
- African Auxiliary Pioneer Corps (1941–1946)

=== Kenya ===
- Kenya Regiment

=== Gold Coast ===
- Gold Coast Constabulary

=== Rhodesia/Nyasaland ===
- British South Africa Police
- Northern Rhodesia Police
- Nyasaland Police
- Nyasaland Volunteer Reserve
- Royal Rhodesia Regiment
- Northern Rhodesia Regiment
- Rhodesian Native Regiment
- 1st (Nyasaland) Battalion, King's African Rifles
- 2nd (Nyasaland) Battalion, King's African Rifles
- 22nd (Nyasaland) Battalion, King's African Rifles
- Southern Rhodesian Reconnaissance Regiment
- ’C’ Squadron, Special Air Service Regiment
- Rhodesian Light Infantry

=== Sudan ===
- Sudan DF

=== Uganda ===
- Uganda Volunteer Reserve

=== Zanzibar ===
- Zanzibar Volunteer DF

== In America ==
=== America ===
- Provincial troops in the French and Indian Wars
- Corps of Colonial Marines
- American Legion (1780–1783)
- De Lancey's Brigade (1776–1783)
- Diemar's Troop of Black Hussars (also, known as Diemar's Hussars and Black Hussars, hussars, (light cavalry) (1779–1781)
- Emmerich's Chasseurs (chasseurs / light cavalry) (1777–1779)
- Georgia Loyalists (1779–1782)
- Guides and Pioneers (absorbed the Black Coy. of Pioneers in 1778) (1778–1783)
- Hierlihy's Corps
- Loyal Foresters
- Loyal New Englanders
- Loyal Rhode Islanders
- McAlpin's Corps (also, known as McAlpin's Corps of Royalists, absorbed the American Volunteers, King’s Loyal Americans, Queen’s Loyal Rangers, and Adams' Rangers)
- Nassau Blues
- North Carolina Highlanders
- Pennsylvania Loyalists
- Provincial Light Infantry
- Royal American Reformers
- Royal Fencible Americans
- Royal Highland Emigrants (placed on British establishment in 1779 as 84th Foot)
- South Carolina Royalists
- West Florida Royal Foresters

==== Units placed on the American establishment ====
- Queen's Rangers (placed on American establishment, in 1779, as 1st American Regiment, descended from Rogers' Rangers)
- Volunteers of Ireland (absorbed the Roman Catholic Volunteers and New Jersey Volunteers and placed on American establishment, in 1779, as 2nd American Regiment, part of the regular, British Army) (1778–1782)
- New York Volunteers (placed on American establishment, as 3rd American Regiment in 1779)
- King's American Regiment (placed on American establishment, in 1781, as 4th American Regiment, part of the regular, British Army) (1776–1783)
- British Legion (placed on American establishment in 1781 as 5th American Regiment) (1777–1778)

==== Regiments ====
- Duke of Cumberland's Regiment (1781–1783)
- King's Royal Regiment of New York
- Loyal American Regiment
- Newfoundland Regiment (placed on British establishment in 1782)

==== Battalions ====
- Maryland Loyalists Bn.
- Royal Garrison Bn. (placed on British establishment in 178

==== Companies ====
- Armed Boat Company (Coy.) (1781–1783)
- Black Coy. of Pioneers (aka. the Black Pioneers, later merged into the Guides and Pioneers in 1778), (pioneers, another name for military construction engineers) (1777–1778)
- Canadian Companies (1777–1783)
- Duchess County Coy. (1776–1777)
- Harkimer's Batteau Coy. (1780–1783)
- Van Alstine's Batteau Coy.
- Newport Artillery Coy. (Rhode Island) 1741

===== Independent Companies =====
- Collett's Independent Coy. (1777)
- Forshner's Independent Coy. (1780–1781)
- North Carolina Independent Coy.
- Locke's Independent Coy.

===== Rangers =====
- Butler's Rangers (1777–1784)
- Claus' Rangers (1775–1783)
- King's Rangers
- King's (Carolina) Rangers
- King's Orange Rangers
- Loyal Rangers
- Loyal American Rangers (1780–1783)
- South Carolina Rangers

==== Volunteers ====
- American Volunteers (1779–1780)
- Caledonian Volunteers (formed part of the British Legion in 1778) (1777–1778)
- Detroit Volunteers (claimed descent from Rogers' Rangers, later became 1st Bn., 119th Field Artillery Regiment, Michigan National Guard) (1778–1783)
- Governor Wentworth's Volunteers (1777–1781)
- New Hampshire Volunteers
- New Jersey Volunteers (Skinner's Greens)
- Prince of Wales's American Volunteers
- Roman Catholic Volunteers (1777–1778)
- Royal Georgia Volunteers
- Royal Nova Scotia Volunteer Regiment
- Saint John's Volunteers
- Volunteers of New England
- West Jersey Volunteers

==== Dragoons ====
- Bucks County Dragoons (absorbed by British Legion in 1780) (1778–1780)
- Campbell's Dragoons (South Carolina Dragoons) (1781)
- Fenwick's Dragoons (South Carolina Dragoons) (1781)
- King's American Dragoons
- North Carolina Independent Dragoons
- Starkloff's Dragoons (South Carolina Dragoons) (1781)

===== Light Dragoons =====
- Georgia Light Dragoons (there was also, a Local Volunteer Corps unit, of the same name) (1779–1781)
- James Island Light Dragoons
- Kinloch's Light Dragoons (formed part of the British Legion in 1778)
- Philadelphia Light Dragoons (formed part of the British Legion in 1778)
- Stewart's Troop of Light Dragoons

=== British Guiana ===
- British Guiana Volunteer Force (BGVF)

=== British Honduras ===
- Prince Regent's Royal Militia (1817–1866)
- Belize Volunteer Force (1866–1868)
- Belize Volunteer Corps (1868–1883)
- Belize Light Infantry Volunteer Force (1897–1905)
- British Honduras (BH) Volunteers (1905–1916)
- BH Territorial Force (1916–1928)
- BH Defense Force (1928–1944)
- BH Home Guard (1942–1943)
- BH Volunteer Guard (1943–1973)
- Belize Volunteer Guard (1973–1977)

=== Canada ===
- Provincial Marine

=== Newfoundland ===
- Newfoundland Royal Naval Reserve

=== Falkland Islands ===
- Falkland Islands DF (1892–Present)

== In Asia ==
=== Aden ===
- Aden Protectorate Levies

=== Burma ===
- Burma Royal Navy Volunteer Reserve

=== Ceylon ===
- Ceylon Volunteers (1881–1910)
- Ceylon Defence Force (DF) (1910–1948)
- Ceylon Royal Naval Volunteer Reserve

=== Iraq ===
- Iraq Levies

=== Malaya ===
- Malay States Volunteer Rifles (1915–1936)
- Malayan Naval Volunteer Reserve

=== Singapore ===
- Singapore Volunteer Corps
- Singapore Naval Volunteer Force

=== Hong Kong ===
- Royal Hong Kong Regiment (1854–1997)

=== India ===
==== Cavalry ====
===== Light Horse =====
- Allahabad Light Horse (LH)
- Assam Valley LH
- Bihar LH
- Bombay LH
- Calcutta LH
- Cawnpore LH
- Ghazipur LH
- Gorakhpur LH
- Oudh LH
- Punjab LH
- Surma Valley LH

===== Mounted Rifles =====
- Northern Bengal Mounted Rifles
- Dehra Dun Mounted Rifles

==== Infantry ====
- Bangalore Contingent
- Calcutta and Presidency Bn.
- Calcutta Presidency Bn.
- Chota Nagpur Regiment
- Coorg and Mysore Coy.
- East Coast Bn.
- Eastern Bengal Coy.
- Kolar Goldfields Bn.
- Madras Guards
- Malwah Bheel Corps
- Meywa Bheel Corps
- Mussourie Bn.
- Nilgiri Malabar Bn.

===== Rifles =====
- Allahabad Rifles
- Cawnpore Rifles
- Coorg and Mysore Rifles
- Hyderabad Rifles
- Nagpur Rifles
- Poona Rifles
- Simla Rifles

====== Volunteer Rifles ======
- Malabar Volunteer Rifles
- Naini Tal Volunteer Rifles
- Shillong Volunteer Rifles

====== Volunteer Rifle Corps ======
- Agra Volunteer Rifle Corps
- Baluchistan Volunteer Rifle Corps
- Bombay Volunteer Rifles Corps
- Lucknow Volunteer Rifle Corps
- Midlands Volunteer Rifle Corps
- Moulmein Volunteer Rifle Corps
- South Andaman Volunteer Rifles Corps
- Yercaud Volunteer Rifle Corps

===== Railway =====
- Madras and Southern Mahratta Railway Rifles

====== Regiments ======
- Bombay, Baroda and Central India Railway Regiment
- East Indian Railway Regiment
- Great Indian Peninsula Railway Regiment

====== Battalions ======
- Assam Bengal Railway Bn.
- Bengal and North West Railway Bn.
- Bengal Nagpur Railway Bn.
- Eastern Bengal Railway Bn.
- Oudh and Rohilkhand Railway Bn.
- North West Railway Bn.
- South Indian Railway Bn.

== In Australia, New Zealand and the Pacific Ocean ==
=== Fiji ===
- Fiji DF

=== New Zealand ===
- Volunteer Force
- Waikato Mounted Rifles
- Hauraki Regiment

== In Caribbean ==
=== Barbados ===
- Barbados Volunteer Force

=== Bermuda ===
- Bermuda Militia (1612–1815) and the Bermuda Militia (1813–1815)
- Bermuda Volunteer Rifle Corps (1894–1965)
- Bermuda Militia Artillery (1895–1965)
- Bermuda Volunteer Engineers (1931–1946)
- Bermuda Militia Infantry (1939–1946)
- Bermuda Home Guard
- Royal Bermuda Regiment (1965–Present)
- Bermuda Cadet Corps (1901–2012)
- Air Training Corps
- Bermuda Sea Cadet Corps (1968–Present)

=== Cayman Islands ===
- Cayman Islands Division of the Jamaica Home Guard (1942–1945)

=== Dominica ===
- Dominica Defence Force

=== Grenada ===
- Grenada DF

=== Leeward Island ===
- Leewards Islands Battalion (1943–1945)
- Leewards Home Guard

=== Mauritius ===
- Mauritius Territorial Force
- Mauritius DF
- Mauritius Regiment

=== Montserrat ===
- Royal Montserrat DF

=== St Christopher Nevis ===
- Saint Kitts and Nevis DF

=== St Lucia ===
- St. Lucia Volunteer Corps

=== Trinidad/Tobago ===
- Trinidad Volunteers (expanded during WWII to form:)
- Trinidad Regiment
- Trinidad Volunteer Artillery
- Trinidad Home Guard

=== West Indies ===
- West India Regiments

=== Jamaica ===
- Jamaica Militia Artillery
- Jamaica Engineer Corps
- Kingston (later Jamaica) Infantry Volunteers
- Jamaica Home Guard

consolidated postwar to form:

- Jamaica DF

== In Europe ==
=== Gibraltar ===
- Royal Gibraltar Regiment

=== Malta ===
- King's Own Malta Regiment

== Medals ==
- Efficiency Decoration
- Efficiency Medal
- Colonial Auxiliary Forces Officers' Decoration
- Colonial Auxiliary Forces Long Service Medal
