= List of regiments of the Indian Army (1903) =

British Indian Army
- Allegiance: British Empire
- Type: Army
- Size: 2.5 million men (1945)
- Engagements: Second Afghan War; Third Afghan War; Second Burmese War; Third Burmese War; Second Opium War; 1882 Anglo-Egyptian War; 1868 Expedition to Abyssinia; First Mohmand Campaign; Boxer Rebellion; Tirah Campaign; British expedition to Tibet; Sudan Campaign; World War I Waziristan campaign 1919–1920; Waziristan campaign 1936–1939; World War II; North West Frontier

Commanders
- Notable commanders: Herbert Kitchener, 1st Earl Kitchener; William Slim, 1st Viscount Slim; Archibald Wavell, 1st Earl Wavell; Claude Auchinleck

The Commander-in-Chief of India, Lord Kitchener carried out a reform of the British Indian Army in 1903. These reforms were intended to improve the Army, which had been formed from the separate Bengal, Bombay and Madras presidency armies in 1895 to be replaced by the Bengal, Bombay, Madras and Punjab commands. The localisation of regiments was abolished, and in future every regiment was to have the opportunity of experiencing service on the Frontier.

To signify the unification of the three presidency armies, regiments in all Corps were assigned new designations with distinct numerals. The Bengal, Madras, and Bombay Sappers and Miners were numbered consecutively, with presidency names removed. Cavalry regiments were numbered as follows:

- Bengal regiments retained their existing numbers.
- 20 was added to the numbers of Punjab regiments. The word 'Punjab' was replaced by 'Frontier Force'.
- 25 was added to the numbers of Madras regiments.
- 1st, 2nd, and 4th Regiments of Cavalry, Hyderabad Contingent were re-numbered as 20th, 29th and 30th.
- 30 was added to the numbers of Bombay regiments.
- The Central India Horse regiments were brought into the line with 37 added to their numbers.

Infantry regiments were numbered as follows:

- Bengal regiments retained their existing numbers. As the 9th, 42nd, 43rd, and 44th regiments were Gurkha Rifle regiments, they were transferred to the Gurkha Line as 9th, 6th, 7th and 8th Gurkha Rifles. Their places were filled by infantry units from Local Corps.
- 50 was added to the numbers of Sikh Infantry regiments.
- Punjab regiments, less the 5th Gurkhas, were numbered consecutively as the 55th to 59th; so that, for example, the 2nd and 4th Punjab Infantry became 56th and 57th respectively. The word 'Punjab' was replaced by 'Frontier Force'.
- 60 was added to the numbers of Madras regiments (53 to that of the 25th regiment of Madras Infantry). The 10th regiment was transferred to the Gurkha Line as the 10th Gurkha Rifles. The remaining Burma regiments were renamed as Punjabis (except the 33rd, which became 93rd Burma Infantry). Regiments which recruited from north-western India were renamed as Punjabis, while those recruiting from southern India were renamed as Carnatic Infantry.
- 93 was added to the numbers of Hyderabad Contingent regiments.
- 100 was added to the numbers of Bombay regiments.

By 1903, the total strength of the Indian Army was 240,000 men. They served in 39 cavalry regiments, 135 infantry battalions (including 17 Gurkha), a joint cavalry-infantry unit the Corps of Guides, three sapper regiments and 12 mountain artillery batteries. In addition to the regular Indian Army, the armies of the Princely states, and regiments of the Auxiliary force (European volunteers) could also be called on to assist in an emergency. The Princely states had 22,613 men in 20 cavalry regiments and 14 infantry battalions. The Auxiliary force could field another 40,000 men in 11 regiments of horse and 42 volunteer infantry battalions. Also available were the Frontier Militia and the Military Police, which could field 34,000 men between them.

== Cavalry ==
=== Bodyguard troops ===
- Governor-General's Bodyguard
- Governor's Bodyguard, Madras
- Governor's Bodyguard, Bombay

=== Former Bengal Regiments ===
- 1st Duke of York's Own Lancers (Skinner's Horse): Late 1st Regiment of Bengal Irregular Cavalry.
- 2nd Lancers (Gardner's Horse): Late 2nd Regiment of Bengal Irregular Cavalry.
- 3rd Skinner's Horse: Late 4th Regiment of Bengal Irregular Cavalry.
- 4th Lancers: Late 6th Regiment of Bengal Irregular Cavalry. Renamed 4th Cavalry in 1904.
- 5th Cavalry: Late 7th Regiment of Bengal Irregular Cavalry.
- 6th Prince of Wales's Cavalry: Late 8th Regiment of Bengal Irregular Cavalry. Renamed 6th King Edward's Own Cavalry in 1906.
- 7th Lancers: Late 17th Regiment of Bengal Irregular Cavalry. Renamed 7th Hariana Lancers in 1904.
- 8th Lancers: Late 18th Regiment of Bengal Irregular Cavalry. Renamed 8th Cavalry in 1904.
- 9th Hodson's Horse
- 10th Duke of Cambridge's Own Lancers (Hodson's Horse)
- 11th Prince of Wales's Own Lancers: Late 1st Regiment of Sikh Irregular Cavalry. Renamed 11th Prince of Wales's Own Lancers (Probyn's Horse) in 1904, 11th King Edward's Own Lancers (Probyn's Horse) in 1906.
- 12th Cavalry: Late 2nd Regiment of Sikh Irregular Cavalry.
- 13th Duke of Connaught's Own Lancers: Late 4th Regiment of Sikh Irregular Cavalry. Renamed 13th Duke of Connaught's Own Lancers (Watson's Horse) in 1904.
- 14th Murray's Jat Lancers
- 15th Lancers (Cureton's Multanis)
- 16th Cavalry
- 17th Cavalry
- 18th Tiwana Lancers: Renamed 18th Prince of Wales's Own Tiwana Lancers in 1906.
- 19th Lancers (Fane's Horse)

=== Former Punjab Regiments ===
- 21st Prince Albert Victor's Own Cavalry (Frontier Force): Late 1st Regiment of Punjab Cavalry. Renamed 21st Prince Albert Victor's Own Cavalry (Frontier Force) (Daly's Horse) in 1904.
- 22nd Cavalry (Frontier Force): Late 2nd Regiment of Punjab Cavalry. Renamed 22nd Sam Browne's Cavalry (Frontier Force) in 1904.
- 23rd Cavalry (Frontier Force): Late 3rd Regiment of Punjab Cavalry.
- 25th Cavalry (Frontier Force): Late 5th Punjab Cavalry.

=== Former Madras regiments ===
- 26th Light Cavalry: Late 1st Regiment of Madras Light Cavalry
- 27th Light Cavalry: Late 2nd Regiment of Madras Light Cavalry.
- 28th Light Cavalry: Late 3rd Regiment of Madras Light Cavalry.

=== Former Hyderabad regiments ===
- 20th Deccan Horse: Late 1st Cavalry, Hyderabad Contingent.
- 29th Lancers (Deccan Horse): Late 2nd Cavalry, Hyderabad Contingent.
- 30th Lancers (Gordon's Horse): Late 4th Cavalry, Hyderabad Contingent.

=== Former Bombay regiments ===
- 31st Duke of Connaught's Own Lancers: Late 1st Regiment of Bombay Light Cavalry.
- 32nd Lancers: Late 2nd Regiment of Bombay Light Cavalry.
- 33rd Queen's Own Light Cavalry: Late 3rd Regiment of Bombay Light Cavalry.
- 34th Prince Albert Victor's Own Poona Horse
- 35th Scinde Horse
- 36th Jacob's Horse
- 37th Lancers (Baluch Horse)

=== Former Local Corps ===
- 38th Central India Horse: Renamed 38th Prince of Wales’s Own Central India Horse in 1906.
- 39th Central India Horse: Renamed 39th Prince of Wales’s Own Central India Horse in 1906.

== Cavalry and Infantry ==
- Queen's Own Corps of Guides: Renamed Queen’s Own Corps of Guides (Lumsden’s) in 1904; Queen Victoria’s Own Corps of Guides (Frontier Force) (Lumsden’s) in 1911. Cavalry and Infantry units separated in 1922.

== Infantry ==
=== Former Bengal Regiments ===
- 1st Brahmans: Late 21st Regiment of Bengal Native Infantry.
- 2nd (Queen’s Own) Rajput Light Infantry: Late 31st Regiment of Bengal Native Infantry. Renamed 2nd Queen Victoria’s Own Rajput Light Infantry in 1911.
- 3rd Brahmans: Late 32nd Regiment of Bengal Native Infantry. Disbanded 1922.
- 4th Prince Albert Victor's Rajputs: Late 33rd Regiment of Bengal Native Infantry.
- 5th Light Infantry: Late 42nd Regiment of Bengal Native Infantry. Disbanded 1922.
- 6th Jat Light Infantry: Late 43rd Regiment of Bengal Native Infantry. Renamed 6th Royal Jat Light Infantry in 1921.
- 7th (Duke of Connaught's Own) Rajputs: Late 47th Regiment of Bengal Native Infantry.
- 8th Rajputs: Late 59th Regiment of Bengal Native Infantry.
- 10th Jats: Late 65th Regiment of Bengal Native Infantry.
- 11th Rajputs: Late 70th Regiment of Bengal Native Infantry.
- 12th Pioneers (The Kelat-i-Ghilzie Regiment)
- 13th Rajputs (The Shekhawati Regiment)
- 14th Ferozepore Sikhs: Renamed 14th Prince of Wales's Own Ferozepore Sikhs in 1906; 14th King George’s Own Ferozepore Sikhs in 1910.
- 15th Ludhiana Sikhs
- 16th Rajputs (The Lucknow Regiment): Formed by amalgamating 13th, 48th, and 71st Regiments of Bengal Native Infantry.
- 17th Infantry (The Loyal Regiment): Formed by amalgamating 3rd, 36th, and 61st Regiments of Bengal Native Infantry. Disbanded 1921.
- 18th Infantry
- 19th Punjabis: Late 7th Regiment of Punjab Infantry.
- 20th (The Duke of Cambridge's Own) Punjabis: Late 8th Regiment of Punjab Infantry. Renamed 20th Duke of Cambridge's Own Infantry (Brownlow's Punjabis) in 1904.
- 21st Punjabis: Late 9th Regiment of Punjab Infantry.
- 22nd Punjabis: Late 11th Regiment of Punjab Infantry.
- 23rd Sikh Pioneers: Late 15th Regiment of Punjab Infantry.
- 24th Punjabis: Late 16th Regiment of Punjab Infantry.
- 25th Punjabis: Late 17th Regiment of Punjab Infantry.
- 26th Punjabis: Late 18th Regiment of Punjab Infantry.
- 27th Punjabis: Late 19th Regiment of Punjab Infantry.
- 28th Punjabis: Late 20th Regiment of Punjab Infantry.
- 29th Punjabis: Late 21st Regiment of Punjab Infantry.
- 30th Punjabis: Late 22nd Regiment of Punjab Infantry.
- 31st Punjabis: Late 23rd Regiment of Punjab Infantry.
- 32nd Sikh Pioneers: Late 24th Regiment of Punjab Infantry.
- 33rd Punjabis
- 34th Sikh Pioneers: Renamed 34th Royal Sikh Pioneers in 1921.
- 35th Sikhs
- 36th Sikhs
- 37th Dogras
- 38th Dogras
- 39th Garhwal Rifles: Renamed 39th Royal Garhwal Rifles in 1921, 18th Royal Garhwal Rifles in 1922.
  - 1st Battalion: Raised 1887.
  - 2nd Battalion: Raised 1901.
- 40th Pathans
- 41st Dogras
- 45th Rattray's Sikhs
- 46th Punjabis
- 47th Duke of Connaught's Own Sikhs
- 48th Pioneers

=== Former Punjab Regiments ===
- 51st Prince of Wales's Own Sikhs (Frontier Force): Late 1st Regiment of Sikh Infantry.
- 52nd Sikhs (Frontier Force): Late 2nd Regiment of Sikh Infantry.
- 53rd Sikhs (Frontier Force): Late 3rd Regiment of Sikh Infantry.
- 54th Sikhs (Frontier Force): Late 4th Regiment of Sikh Infantry.
- 55th Coke's Rifles (Frontier Force): Late 1st Regiment of Punjab Infantry.
- 56th Infantry (Frontier Force): Late 2nd Regiment of Punjab Infantry. Renamed 56th Punjabi Rifles (Frontier Force) in 1906.
- 57th Wilde's Rifles (Frontier Force): Late 4th Regiment of Punjab Infantry.
- 58th Vaughan's Rifles (Frontier Force): Late 5th Regiment of Punjab Infantry.
- 59th Scinde Rifles (Frontier Force): Late 6th Regiment of Punjab Infantry. Renamed 59th Royal Scinde Rifles (Frontier Force) in 1921.

=== Former Madras Regiments ===
- 61st Pioneers: Late 1st Regiment of Madras Native Infantry. Renamed 61st Prince of Wales's Own Pioneers in 1906; 61st King George's Own Pioneers in 1910.
- 62nd Punjabis: Late 2nd Regiment of Madras Native Infantry.
- 63rd Palamcottah Light Infantry: Late 3rd Regiment of Madras Native Infantry. Disbanded 1922.
- 64th Pioneers: Late 4th Regiment of Madras Native Infantry.
- 65th Carnatic Infantry: Late 5th Regiment of Madras Native Infantry. Disbanded 1904.
- 66th Punjabis: Late 6th Regiment of Madras Native Infantry.
- 67th Punjabis: Late 7th Regiment of Madras Native Infantry.
- 69th Punjabis: Late 9th Regiment of Madras Native Infantry.
- 71st Coorg Rifles: Late 11th Regiment of Madras Native Infantry. Disbanded 1904.
- 72nd Punjabis: Late 12th Regiment of Madras Native Infantry.
- 73rd Carnatic Infantry: Late 13th Regiment of Madras Native Infantry.
- 74th Punjabis: Late 14th Regiment of Madras Native Infantry.
- 75th Carnatic Infantry: Late 15th Regiment of Madras Native Infantry.
- 76th Punjabis: Late 16th Regiment of Madras Native Infantry.
- 77th Moplah Rifles: Late 17th Regiment of Madras Native Infantry. Disbanded 1907.
- 78th Moplah Rifles: Late 25th Regiment of Madras Native Infantry. Disbanded 1907.
- 79th Carnatic Infantry: Late 19th Regiment of Madras Native Infantry.
- 80th Carnatic Infantry: Late 20th Regiment of Madras Native Infantry. Disbanded 1921.
- 81st Pioneers: Late 21st Regiment of Madras Native Infantry.
- 82nd Punjabis: Late 22nd Regiment of Madras Native Infantry.
- 83rd Wallajahbad Light Infantry: Late 23rd Regiment of Madras Native Infantry.
- 84th Punjabis: Late 24th Regiment of Madras Native Infantry.
- 86th Carnatic Infantry: Late 26th Regiment of Madras Native Infantry.
- 87th Punjabis: Late 27th Regiment of Madras Native Infantry.
- 88th Carnatic Infantry: Late 28th Regiment of Madras Native Infantry. Disbanded 1922.
- 89th Punjabis: Late 29th Regiment of Madras Native Infantry.
- 90th Punjabis: Late 30th Regiment of Madras Native Infantry.
- 91st Punjabis (Light Infantry): Late 31st Regiment of Madras Native Infantry.
- 92nd Punjabis: Late 32nd Regiment of Madras Native Infantry.
- 93rd Burma Infantry: Late 33rd Regiment of Madras Native Infantry.

=== Former Hyderabad Regiments ===
- 94th Russell's Infantry: Late 1st Regiment of Infantry, Hyderabad Contingent.
- 95th Russell's Infantry: Late 2nd Regiment of Infantry, Hyderabad Contingent.
- 96th Berar Infantry: Late 3rd Regiment of Infantry, Hyderabad Contingent.
- 97th Deccan Infantry: Late 4th Regiment of Infantry, Hyderabad Contingent.
- 98th Infantry: Late 5th Regiment of Infantry, Hyderabad Contingent.
- 99th Deccan Infantry: Late 6th Regiment of Infantry, Hyderabad Contingent.

=== Former Bombay Regiments ===
- 101st Grenadiers: Late 1st Regiment of Bombay Native Infantry.
- 102nd Prince of Wales's Own Grenadiers: Late 2nd Regiment of Bombay Native Infantry. Renamed 102nd King Edward's Own Grenadiers in 1906.
- 103rd Mahratta Light Infantry: Late 3rd Regiment of Bombay Native Infantry.
- 104th Wellesley's Rifles: Late 4th Regiment of Bombay Native Infantry.
- 105th Mahratta Light Infantry: Late 5th Regiment of Bombay Native Infantry.
- 107th Pioneers: Late 7th Regiment of Bombay Native Infantry.
- 108th Infantry: Late 8th Regiment of Bombay Native Infantry.
- 109th Infantry: Late 9th Regiment of Bombay Native Infantry.
- 110th Mahratta Light Infantry: Late 10th Regiment of Bombay Native Infantry.
- 112th Infantry: Late 12th Regiment of Bombay Native Infantry.
- 113th Infantry: Late 13th Regiment of Bombay Native Infantry.
- 114th Mahrattas: Late 14th Regiment of Bombay Native Infantry.
- 116th Mahrattas: Late 16th Regiment of Bombay Native Infantry.
- 117th Mahrattas: Late 17th Regiment of Bombay Native Infantry. Renamed 117th Royal Mahrattas in 1921.
- 119th Infantry (The Mooltan Regiment): Late 19th Regiment of Bombay Native Infantry.
- 120th Rajputana Infantry: Late 20th Regiment of Bombay Native Infantry. Renamed 120th (Prince of Wales's Own) Rajputana Infantry in 1917.
- 121st Pioneers
- 122nd Rajputana Infantry: Late 22nd Regiment of Bombay Native Infantry.
- 123rd Outram's Rifles: Late 23rd Regiment of Bombay Native Infantry.
- 124th Duchess of Connaught's Own Baluchistan Infantry: Late 24th Regiment of Bombay Native Infantry.
- 125th Napier's Rifles: Late 25th Regiment of Bombay Native Infantry.
- 126th Baluchistan Infantry: Late 26th Regiment of Bombay Native Infantry.
- 127th Baluch Light Infantry: Renamed 127th Princess of Wales's Own Baluch Light Infantry in 1909; 127th Queen Mary's Own Baluch Light Infantry in 1910.
- 128th Pioneers: Late 28th Regiment of Bombay Native Infantry.
- 129th Duke of Connaught's Own Baluchis
- 130th Baluchis: Renamed 130th Prince of Wales's Own Baluchis in 1906; 130th King George's Own Baluchis (Jacob's Rifles) in 1910.

=== Former Local Corps ===
- 9th Bhopal Infantry
- 42nd Deoli Regiment: Disbanded 1921.
- 43rd Erinpura Regiment: Disbanded 1921.
- 44th Merwara Infantry: Disbanded 1921.

=== Gurkha Line ===
- 1st Gurkha Rifles (The Malaun Regiment): Late 66th Regiment of Bengal Native Infantry. Renamed 1st Prince of Wales's Own Gurkha Rifles (The Malaun Regiment) in 1906; 1st King George's Own Gurkha Rifles (the Malaun Regiment) in 1910.
  - 1st Battalion: Raised 1815.
  - 2nd Battalion: Raised 1886.
- 2nd (the Prince of Wales's Own) Gurkha Rifles (the Sirmoor Rifles): Renamed 2nd King George's Own Gurkha Rifles (the Sirmoor Rifles) in 1906.
  - 1st Battalion: Raised 1815.
  - 2nd Battalion: Raised 1886.
- 3rd Gurkha Rifles: Renamed 3rd (The Queen's Own) Gurkha Rifles in 1907; 3rd Queen Alexandra's Own Gurkha Rifles in 1908.
  - 1st Battalion: Raised 1815.
  - 2nd Battalion: Raised 1891.
- 4th Gurkha Rifles
  - 1st Battalion: Raised 1857.
  - 2nd Battalion: Raised 1886.
- 5th Gurkha Rifles (Frontier Force): Late 25th Regiment of Punjab Infantry. Renamed 5th Royal Gurkha Rifles (Frontier Force) in 1921.
  - 1st Battalion: Raised 1858.
  - 2nd Battalion: Raised 1886.
- 6th Gurkha Rifles
  - 1st Battalion: Raised 1817.
  - 2nd battalion: Raised 1904.
- 7th Gurkha Rifles: Late 43rd Regiment of Bengal Infantry
  - 1st Battalion: Raised as 1/8th Gurkha Rifles in 1902. Became 2/10th Gurkha Rifles in 1903; 1/7th Gurkha Rifles in 1907.
  - 2nd Battalion: Raised 1907.
- 8th Gurkha Rifles: Late 44th Regiment of Bengal Infantry
  - 1st Battalion: Raised 1824.
  - 2nd Battalion: Raised 1835. Became 1/7th Gurkha Rifles in 1903; 2/8th Gurkha Rifles in 1907.
- 9th Gurkha Rifles: Late 63rd Regiment of Bengal Native Infantry
  - 1st Battalion: Raised 1817.
  - 2nd Battalion: Raised 1904.
- 10th Gurkha Rifles: Late 10th Regiment of Madras Native Infantry
  - 1st Battalion: Re-raised in 1890.
  - 2nd Battalion: Raised 1908.

== Support Arms ==
=== Indian Mountain Artillery ===
- 21st Kohat Mountain Battery (Frontier Force)
- 22nd Derajat Mountain Battery (Frontier Force)
- 23rd Peshawar Mountain Battery (Frontier Force)
- 24th Hazara Mountain Battery (Frontier Force)
- 25th Mountain Battery
- 26th Jacob's Mountain Battery
- 27th Mountain Battery
- 28th Mountain Battery
- 29th Mountain Battery
- 30th Mountain Battery
- 31st Mountain Battery (Raised 1907)
- 32nd Mountain Battery (Raised 1907)
- The Frontier Garrison Artillery

=== Engineers ===
- 1st Sappers and Miners
- 2nd Queen's Own Sappers and Miners
- 3rd Sappers and Miners
- Indian Submarine Mining Corps

== Services ==
- Army Bearer Corps
  - No.22 Company
  - No.23 Company
- Army Clothing Department
- Army Hospital Corps
  - No.17 Company
  - No.18 Company
- Army Remount Department
- Army Veterinary Service
- Indian Medical Department
- Indian Medical Service
- Indian Ordnance Department
- Supply and Transport Corps

== Imperial Service Troops ==
- Alwar Lancers
- Alwar Infantry
- Bahawalpur Mounted Rifles and Camel Transport Corps
- Bikaner Camel Corps
- Bikaner Light Infantry
- Gwalior Lancers
- Gwalior Infantry
- Gwalior Transport Corps
- Hyderabad Lancers
- Jaipur Transport Corps
- Jind Infantry
- Jodhpur Lancers
- Kapurthala Infantry
- Kashmir Artillery
  - No. 1 Mountain Battery
  - No. 2 Mountain Battery
- Kashmir Infantry
- Kashmir Rifles
- Malerkotla Sappers
- Mysore Infantry
- Mysore Lancers
- Mysore Horse
- Mysore Transport Corps
- Nabha Infantry
- Patiala Lancers
- Patiala Infantry
- Sirmoor Sappers

== Volunteer Corps ==
=== Cavalry ===
- Allahabad Light Horse
- Assam Valley Light Horse
- Bihar Light Horse
- Bombay Light Horse
- Calcutta Light Horse
- Cawnpore Light Horse
- Chota Nagpur Mounted Rifles
- Ghazipur Light Horse
- Gorakhpur Light Horse
- Northern Bengal Mounted Rifles
- Oudh Light Horse
- Punjab Light Horse
- Surma Valley Light Horse
- United Provinces Light Horse formed 1904 by amalgamating the Allahabad, Cawnpore, Ghazipur, Gorakhpur, & Oudh Light Horse.

=== Artillery ===
- Bombay Volunteer Artillery
- Calcutta Naval Artillery Volunteers
- Cossipore Artillery Volunteers
- Karachi Artillery Volunteers
- Madras Artillery Volunteers
- Moulmein Volunteer Artillery Corps
- Rangoon Port Defence Volunteers

=== Engineers ===
- Calcutta Company
- Bombay Company
- Karachi Company

=== Infantry ===
- Agra Volunteer Rifle Corps
- Allahabad Volunteer Rifle Corps
- Assam Bengal Railway Volunteer Rifles
- Bangalore Rifle Volunteers
- Bengal and North Western Railway Volunteer Corps
- Bengal Nagpur Railway Volunteer Rifle Corps
- Berar Volunteer Rifle Corps
- Bombay, Baroda and Central India Railway Volunteer Corps
- Bombay Volunteer Rifles Corps
- Burma Railways Volunteers Corps
- Calcutta Volunteer Rifles
  - 1st Battalion
  - 2nd (Presidency) Battalion
  - 3rd (Cadet) Battalion
- Cawnpore Volunteer Rifle Corps
- Coorg and Mysore Rifles
- East Coast Volunteer Rifles
- East Indian Railway Volunteer Rifle Corps
- Eastern Bengal Volunteer Rifles
- Eastern Bengal State Railway Volunteer Rifle Corps
- Great Indian Pensinula Railway Volunteer Corps
  - 1st Battalion
  - 2nd Battalion - former Midland Railway Volunteer Corps
- Hyderabad Volunteer Rifle Corps
- Kolar Gold Fields Battalion
- Lucknow Volunteer Rifle Corps
- Madras Railway Volunteers
- Madras Volunteer Guards
- Malabar Volunteer Rifles
- Moulmein Volunteer Rifle Corps
- Mussoorie Volunteer Rifle Corps
- Nagpur Volunteer Rifles
- Naini Tal Volunteer Rifle Corps
- Nilgiri Volunteer Rifles
- North Western Railway Volunteer Rifles
- Oudh and Rohilkhand Railway Battalion
- Poona Volunteer Rifles
- Punjab Volunteer Rifle Corps
- Rangoon Volunteer Rifle Corps
- Shillong Volunteer Rifles
- Simla Volunteer Rifles
- Sind Volunteer Rifle Corps
- South Andaman Volunteer Rifles Corps
- South Indian Railway Volunteer Rifles Corps
- Southern Mahratta Railway Rifle Corps
- Upper Burma Volunteer Rifles

== Frontier Corps and Para-Military Units ==
=== North-West Frontier and Baluchistan ===
- Chitral Scouts
- Frontier Constabulary
- Khyber Rifles
- Kurram Militia
- North Waziristan Militia
- South Waziristan Militia
- Mekran Levy Corps
- Zhob Levy Corps

=== North-East Frontier and Burma ===
- Assam Military Police
- Burma Military Police

== Units formed in World War I ==
=== Cavalry ===
- 40th Indian Cavalry Regiment
- 41st Indian Cavalry Regiment
- 42nd Indian Cavalry Regiment
- 43rd Indian Cavalry Regiment
- 44th Indian Cavalry Regiment
- 45th Indian Cavalry Regiment
- 46th Indian Cavalry Regiment

=== Artillery ===
- 33rd (Reserve) Mountain Battery
- 34th (Reserve) Mountain Battery
- 35th (Reserve) Mountain Battery
- 39th (Reserve) Mountain Battery

=== Infantry ===
- 49th Bengal Infantry
- 1st Battalion, 50th Kumaon Rifles
- 2nd Battalion, 50th Kumaon Rifles
- 1st Battalion, 70th Burma Rifles
- 2nd Battalion, 70th Burma Rifles
- 3rd Battalion, 70th Burma Rifles
- 4th Battalion, 70th Burma Rifles
- 71st Punjabis
- 85th Burman Rifles
- 111th Mahars
- 1st Battalion, 131st United Provinces Regiment
- 2nd Battalion, 131st United Provinces Regiment
- 1st Battalion, 132nd (Punjab Police) Regiment renamed 3rd Battalion, 30th Punjabis
- 2nd Battalion, 132nd (Punjab Police) Regiment renamed 4th Battalion, 30th Punjabis
- 133rd Regiment
- 140th Patiala Regiment
- 141st Bikanir Infantry
- 142nd Jodhpur Infantry
- 143rd Narsingh (Dholpur) Infantry
- 144th Bharatpur Infantry
- 145th Alwar (Jai Paltan) Infantry
- 1st Battalion, 150th Infantry
- 2nd Battalion, 150th Infantry
- 3rd Battalion, 150th Infantry
- 1st Battalion, 151st Sikh Infantry
- 2nd Battalion, 151st Sikh Infantry
- 3rd Battalion, 151st Punjabi Rifles
- 1st Battalion, 152nd Punjabis
- 2nd Battalion, 152nd Punjabis
- 3rd Battalion, 152nd Punjabis
- 1st Battalion, 153rd Punjabis
- 2nd Battalion, 153rd Punjabis
- 3rd Battalion, 153rd Rifles
- 1st Battalion, 154th Infantry
- 2nd Battalion, 154th Infantry
- 3rd Battalion, 154th Infantry
- 1st Battalion, 155th Pioneers
- 2nd Battalion, 155th Pioneers
- 1st Battalion, 156th Infantry
- 1st Battalion, 11th Gurkha Rifles
- 2nd Battalion, 11th Gurkha Rifles
- 3rd Battalion, 11th Gurkha Rifles
- 4th Battalion, 11th Gurkha Rifles

=== Paramilitary ===
- Mohmand Militia
- Sistan Levy Corps

== See also ==
- Kitchener Reforms
- List of regiments of the Indian Army (1922)
- List of regiments of the Indian Army
