= Uganda Rifles =

British Colonial Auxiliary Forces military unit

The Ugandan Rifles was a British Colonial Auxiliary Forces military unit created in 1895 that was later merged into the King's African Rifles in 1902. It was the successor to the Uganda Frontier Force, which had its origins in 1890 when a force of 50 troops recruited in Sudan and Somalia arrived in the country.
