= King's African Rifles =

British Colonial Auxiliary Forces regiment

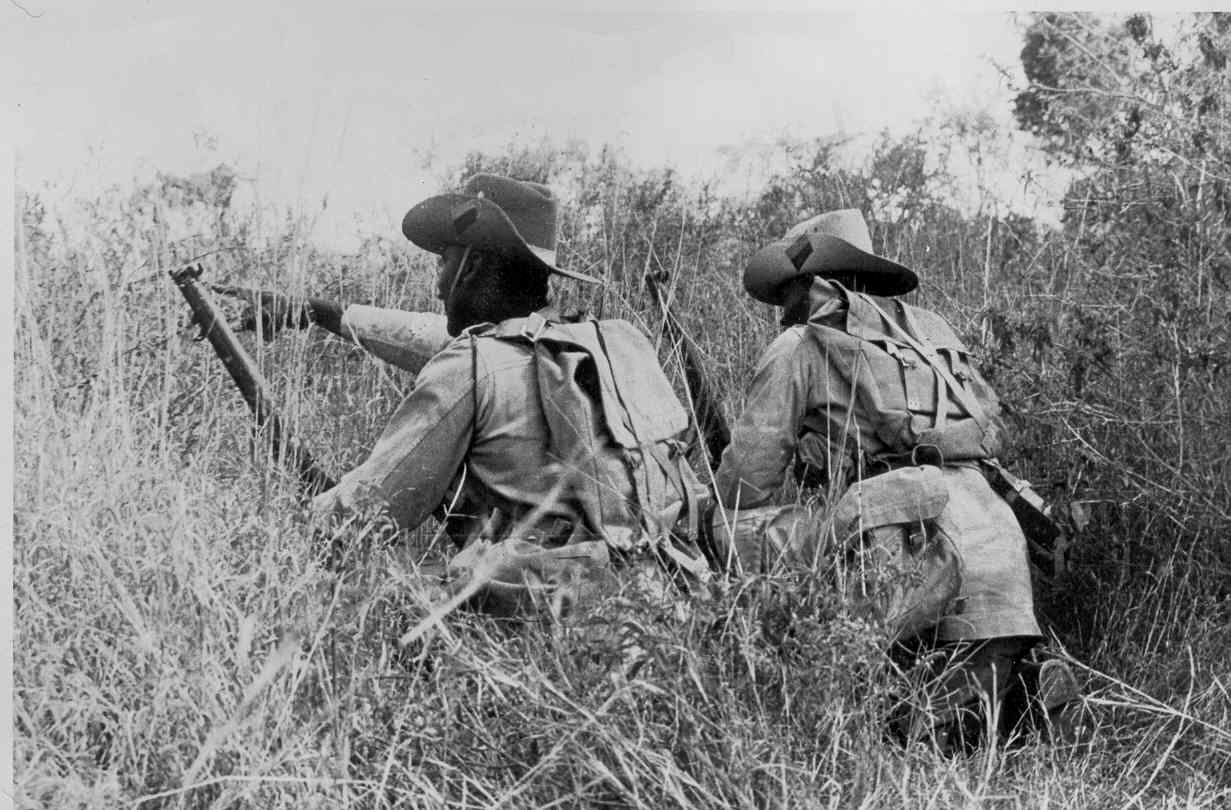
- KAR troops training in Kenya, c. 1944
- Active: 1902–1960s
- Country: British Africa
- Allegiance: British Empire
- Branch: British Colonial Auxiliary Forces
- Role: Internal security
- Size: 30,000
- Engagements: Dervish War; World War I; East African campaign; World War II; East African campaign; Burma campaign; Malayan Emergency; Mau Mau uprising

The King's African Rifles (KAR) was a British Colonial Auxiliary Forces regiment raised from Britain's East African colonies in 1902. It primarily carried out internal security duties within these colonies along with military service elsewhere during the world wars and other conflicts, such as the Malayan Emergency and the Mau Mau uprising. The regiment's enlisted soldiers were drawn from the native Africans, while most officers were seconded from the British Army. During the 1960s, as part of the decolonisation of Africa, more African officers were commissioned into the regiment before it was gradually disbanded. KAR battalions would go on to form the core of newly established armed forces throughout East Africa.

== Uniforms ==
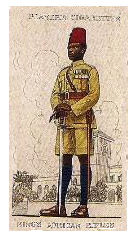
Warrant officer of the King's African Rifles on a 1938 Player's cigarette card

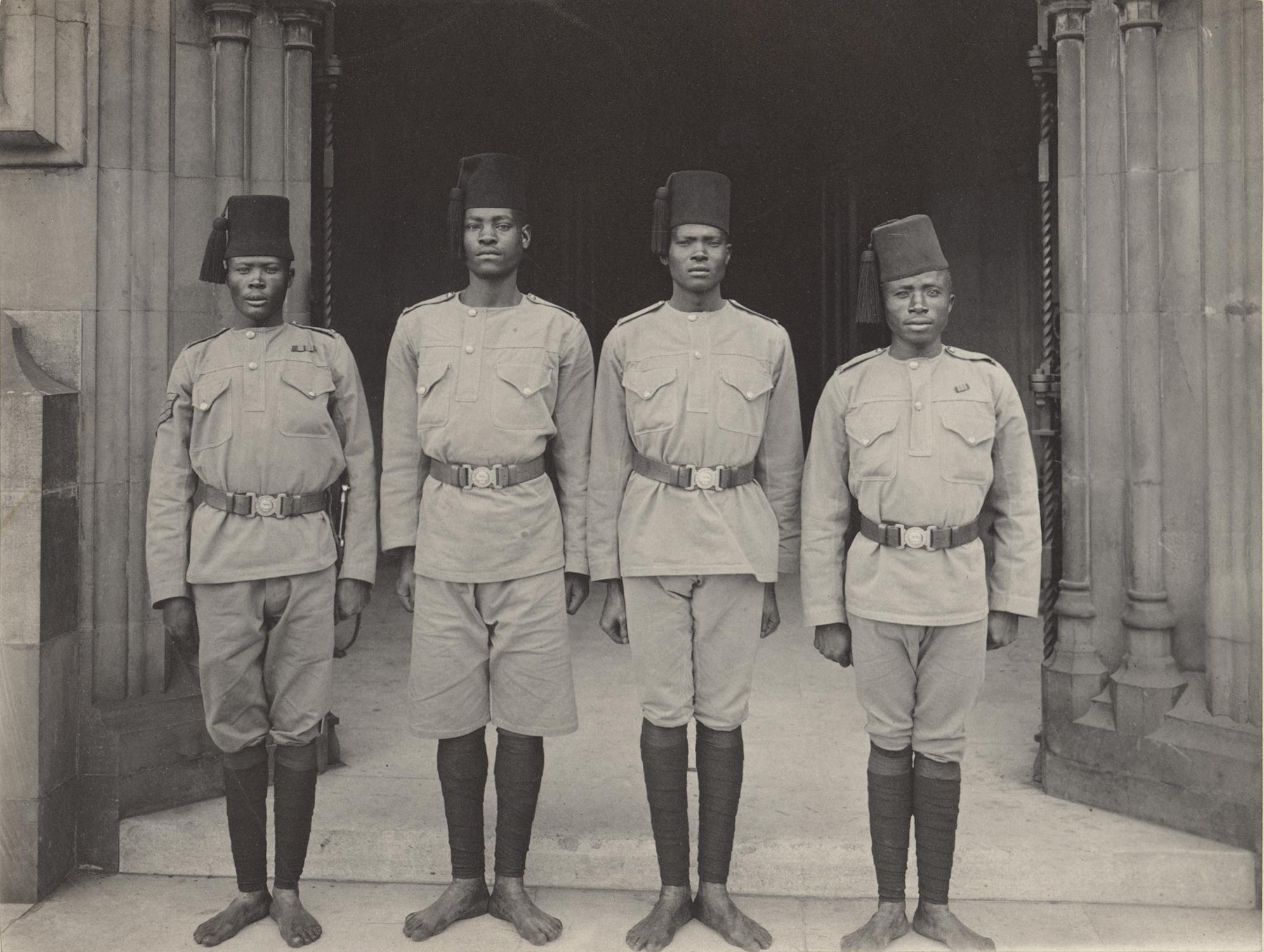
Contingent of KAR at the Coronation of King Edward VII and Queen Alexandra in 1902, photographed by John Benjamin Stone; the written notes indicate some are Sudanese

Until independence, the parade uniform of the KAR comprised khaki drill, with tall fezzes and cummerbunds. The latter items were normally red, although there were some battalion distinctions with Nyasaland units, for example, wearing black fezzes. Prior to 1914, the regiment's field service uniforms consisted of a dark blue jersey and puttees, khaki shorts and a khaki fez cover with integral foldable cloth peak and neck flap, the designs according to Sealed Patterns procured from India. To note, although this was official regulation, a caption from 1898 describes the equipment and uniforms as being 'anything procurable' and equipment shortages plagued the regiment throughout its early years.

In 1898, Good Conduct stripes were also introduced, carrying an extra shilling (from originally 5 shillings a month) for those who had not been sentenced for imprisonment, confined to barracks for seven days, to a fine of more than five shillings, or corporal punishment. In addition, they also wore brown leather equipment similar to the 1888 Slade–Wallace British equivalent, but locally produced. Askaris wore sandals or were barefoot, on the rationale that the heavy military boots of the period were unsuitable for African recruits who had not previously worn footwear. Fezzes bore an Arabic or Roman number with the wartime-raised battalions wearing theirs on geometric-shaped patches of cloth. During the Great War, all the dark blue items were replaced with khaki equivalents and a short pillbox hat with a khaki cover was worn on campaign. During the interwar years, the khaki shirt was replaced by a collarless blue-grey angora shirt called a "greyback". Officers and senior NCOs wore slouch hats with coloured hackles. In the Second World War the khaki shirt was returned (potentially before) along with slouch hats for lower ranks, often with one side pinned up. Units were also equipped, to an unknown extent, with 1937 pattern web equipment.

== Formation ==
Six battalions were formed in 1902 by the amalgamation of the Central Africa Regiment (CAR), East Africa Rifles (EAR) and Uganda Rifles, with one or two battalions located in each of Nyasaland, Kenya, Uganda and British Somaliland:

- 1st (Nyasaland) Battalion [1902–1964] with eight companies (formerly 1CAR)
- 2nd (Nyasaland) Battalion [1902–1963] with six companies (formerly 2CAR)

The 1st and 2nd Battalions were also known as the 1st and 2nd Central African Battalions:

- 3rd (Kenya) Battalion [1902–1963] with seven companies and a camel company (formerly the East African Rifles)
- 4th (Uganda) Battalion [1902–1962] with nine companies (formerly the African Companies of the Uganda Rifles)
- 5th (Uganda) Battalion [1902–1904] with four companies (formerly the Indian Contingent of the Uganda Rifles) – the senior battalion as it was the first to be raised.
- 6th (British Somaliland) Battalion [1902–1910] formed from three infantry companies, the camel corps, militia and mounted infantry of the local forces in British Somaliland.

On formation, there was no regular staff system in connection with these six battalions beyond the usual regimental staff and an Inspector-General who made two annual tours and reported to the Foreign Office.

The 5th and 6th battalions were disbanded by 1910 as a cost-saving measure by the Colonial Office and out of white-settler concern over the existence of a large indigenous armed force.

== Operational history ==
=== Somaliland campaigns ===
During the early 1900s the King's African Rifles took part in the Somaliland campaign against Mohammed Abdullah Hassan (known to the British as the 'Mad Mullah') and the Dervishes. Lt-Col. Alexander Cobbe of 1st (Central Africa) Battalion KAR, was awarded the Victoria Cross for his action at Erego, on 6 October 1902.

The KAR were part of the British air and ground force that defeated the Dervish movement in 1920.

=== First World War ===
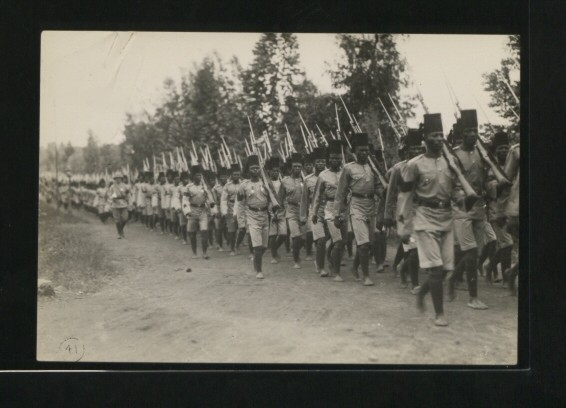
The original 3rd Bn KAR formed in 1902 in Kenya

The KAR began the First World War with 21 small companies in three battalions (each with up to eight companies following the British pre-1913 half-company establishment): the 1st Nyasaland (half of the battalion was located in the northeast Nyasaland), 3rd East Africa (with one company on Zanzibar) and the 4th Uganda, both of the latter included the 4th platoon of Sudanese with the 4th platoon of 4th battalion being led by Sudanese officers. Additionally, the companies were scattered over British East Africa.

Full strength of the KAR in 1914 was 70 British officers, three British NCOs, and 2,325 Africans. There were no organic heavy weapons (each company had one machine gun), including artillery or organised reserves and the companies were, in reality, large platoons of 70 to 80 men.

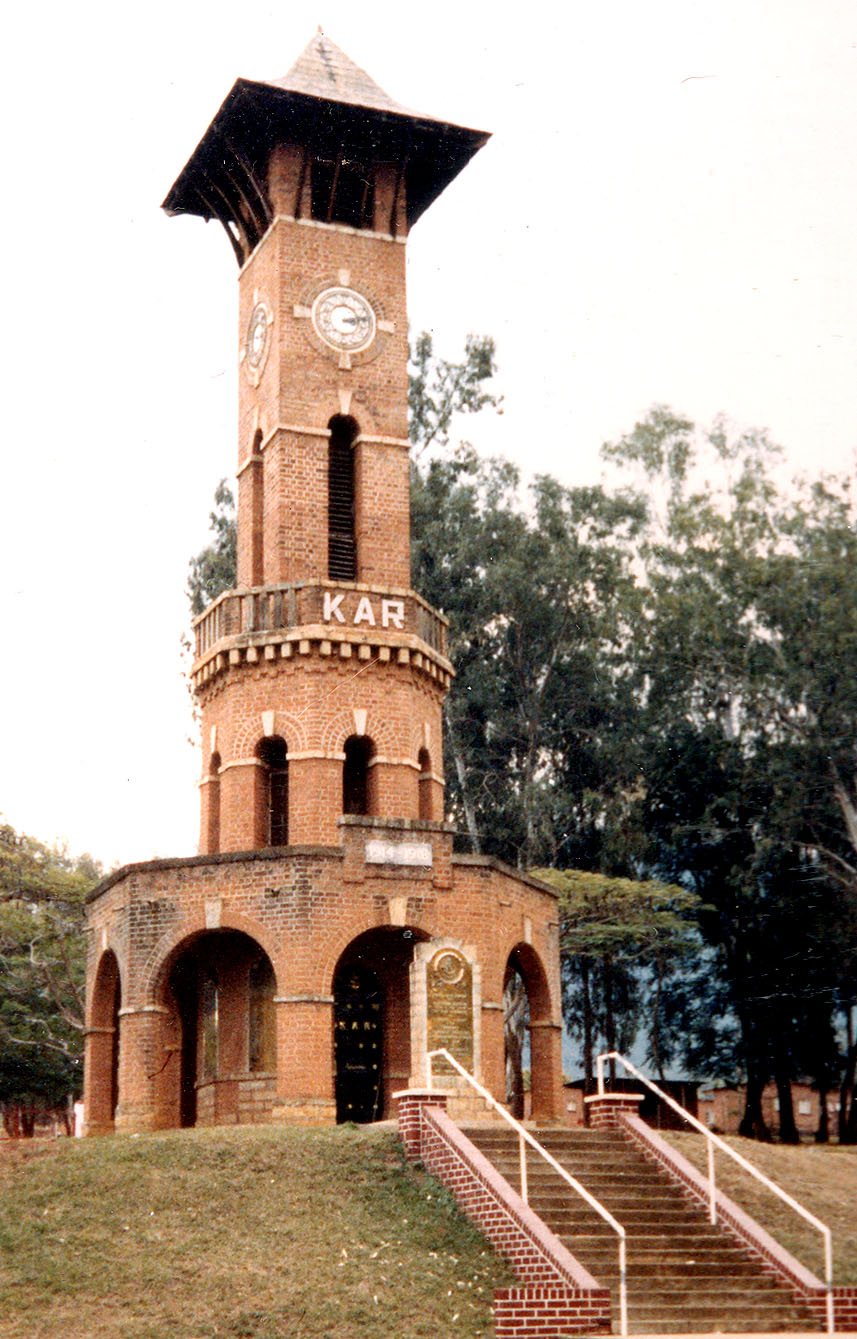
King's African Rifles War Memorial, Zomba, Malawi

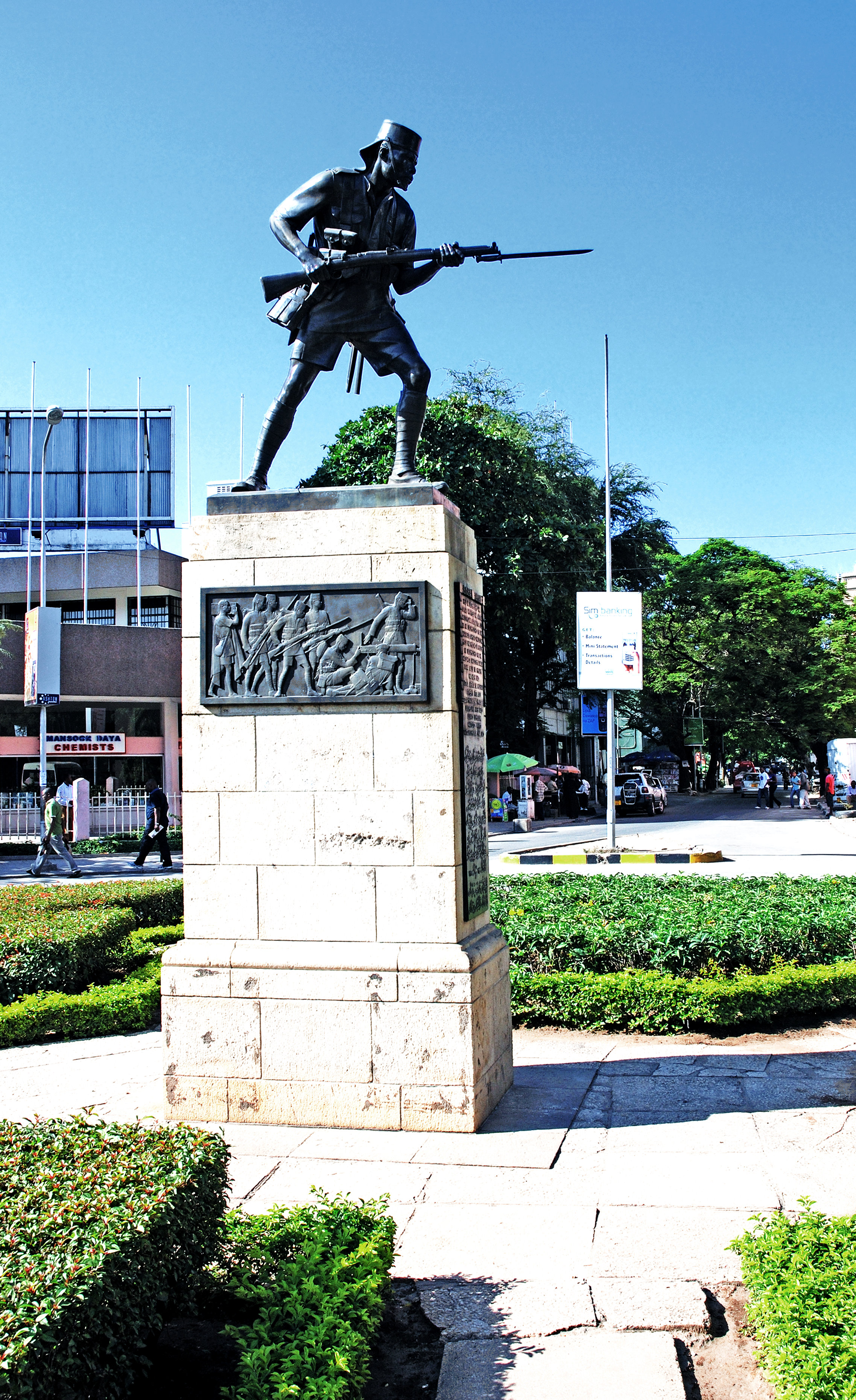
The Askari Monument in Dar es Salaam

In 1915 the KAR was expanded by having the three battalions reorganised into standard four-company battalions, which were then brought up to full strength at 1,045 men each. It was not until early 1916 that the 2nd Nyasaland and 5th Kenya battalions [1916–1963] were re-raised, this being due to do with white sensitivities in Kenya about arming and training large numbers of black African troops. Later in 1916 the 2nd, 3rd and 4th battalions were expanded into two battalions each through recruiting in their home areas. It was not until General Hoskins (formerly the Inspector General of the KAR) was appointed to command British East African forces in 1917 that genuine expansion began. The 1st Battalion was doubled, and the 6th (Tanganyika Territory) Battalion was raised from Schutztruppe of the former German East Africa and then it too was doubled. The 7th was formed from the Zanzibar Armed Constabulary and the Mafia Constabulary. Later in 1917 many other duplicate battalions were created as the first four battalions (now called regiments in the British tradition) each raised a 3rd battalion and a 4th or Training Battalion. The 4th Regiment raised an additional two battalions, the 5th, and 6th through recruiting in Uganda. The KAR Mounted Infantry Unit (on camels), originally part of the 3rd regiment and the KAR Signals Company were also raised.

Thus, in late 1918, the KAR consisted of 22 battalions as follows:

- Western Force: 1st KAR Regiment with 1st, 2nd, and 3rd Battalions; plus 1st and 2nd Battalions 4th KAR Regt
- Eastern Force: 2nd KAR Regiment with 1st, 2nd and 3rd Battalions; 1st and 2nd Battalion of the 3rd KAR; plus 3rd and 4th Battalions 4th KAR Regt
- German East Africa Garrison: 3rd Battalion of the 3rd KAR, 5th battalion of the 4th KAR, 2nd battalion of the 6th KAR, 1st Battalion of the 7th KAR.
- British East Africa Garrison: 1st Battalion of the 5th KAR, 1st Battalion of the 6th KAR
- KAR Training Force: 4th Battalion 1st KAR, 4th Battalion 2nd KAR, 4th Battalion 3rd KAR, 6th Battalion 4th KAR

Part of the KAR's expansion involved bringing up unit strengths to the same size as British and Indian Army Imperial Service units, while also increasing the numbers of white officers and NCOs. The increase in cadres was difficult due to the shortage of Swahili-speaking whites, as many white settlers had already formed segregated units such as the East African Mounted Rifles, the East African Regiment, the Uganda Volunteer Rifles and the Zanzibar Volunteer Defence Force.

The regiment fought in the East African Campaign against the German commander Paul Erich von Lettow-Vorbeck and his forces in German East Africa. Transport and support into the interior were provided by over 400,000 porters of the Carrier Corps.

By the end of the Great War, the KAR comprised 1,193 British officers, 1,497 British NCOs and 30,658 Africans (33,348 total) in 22 battalions, including two made up of former German askaris, as noted above. In Armies in East Africa 1914–18, Peter Abbot notes that the KAR units recruited from former prisoners of war were used as garrison troops by the British, to avoid any conflict of loyalties. However, one of these battalions was involved in the pursuit of a force under Hauptman Wintgens from February to October 1917.

KAR casualties in the First World War were 5,117 killed and wounded with another 3,039 dying from diseases.

=== Inter-war period ===
During the interwar period, the KAR was slowly demobilised to a peacetime establishment of six battalions, at which strength the regiment remained until the Second World War. In 1938, the regiment was composed of two brigade-strength units organised as a "Northern Brigade" and a "Southern Brigade." The combined strength of both units amounted to 94 officers, 60 non-commissioned officers, and 2,821 African other ranks. After the outbreak of war, these units provided the trained nucleus for the rapid expansion of the KAR. By March 1940, the strength of the KAR had reached 883 officers, 1,374 non-commissioned officers, and 20,026 African other ranks.

=== Second World War ===
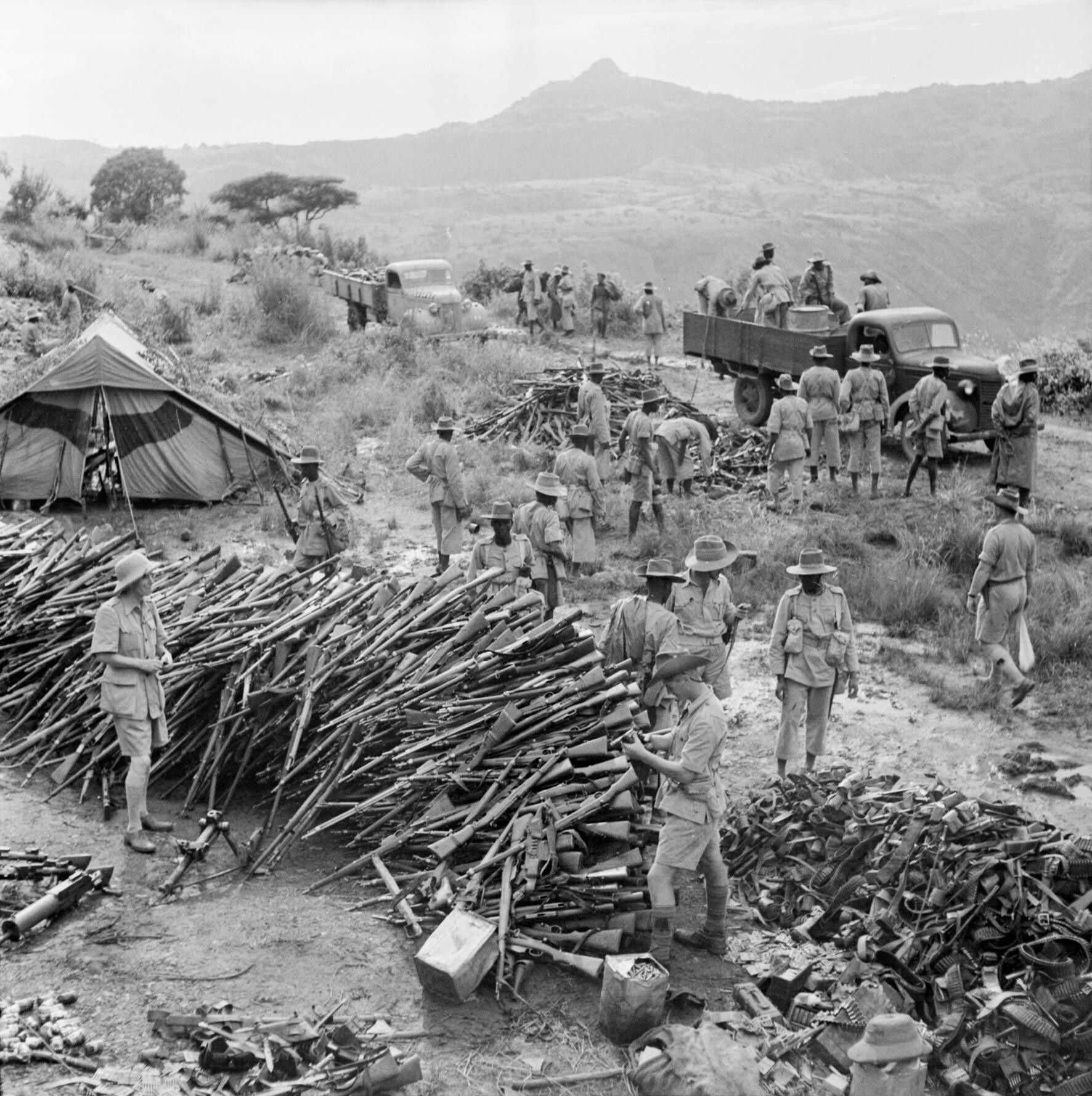
28 September 1941 at Wolchefit Pass, Ethiopia; men of the KAR collect weapons surrendered by Italian forces, towards the end of the East African campaign

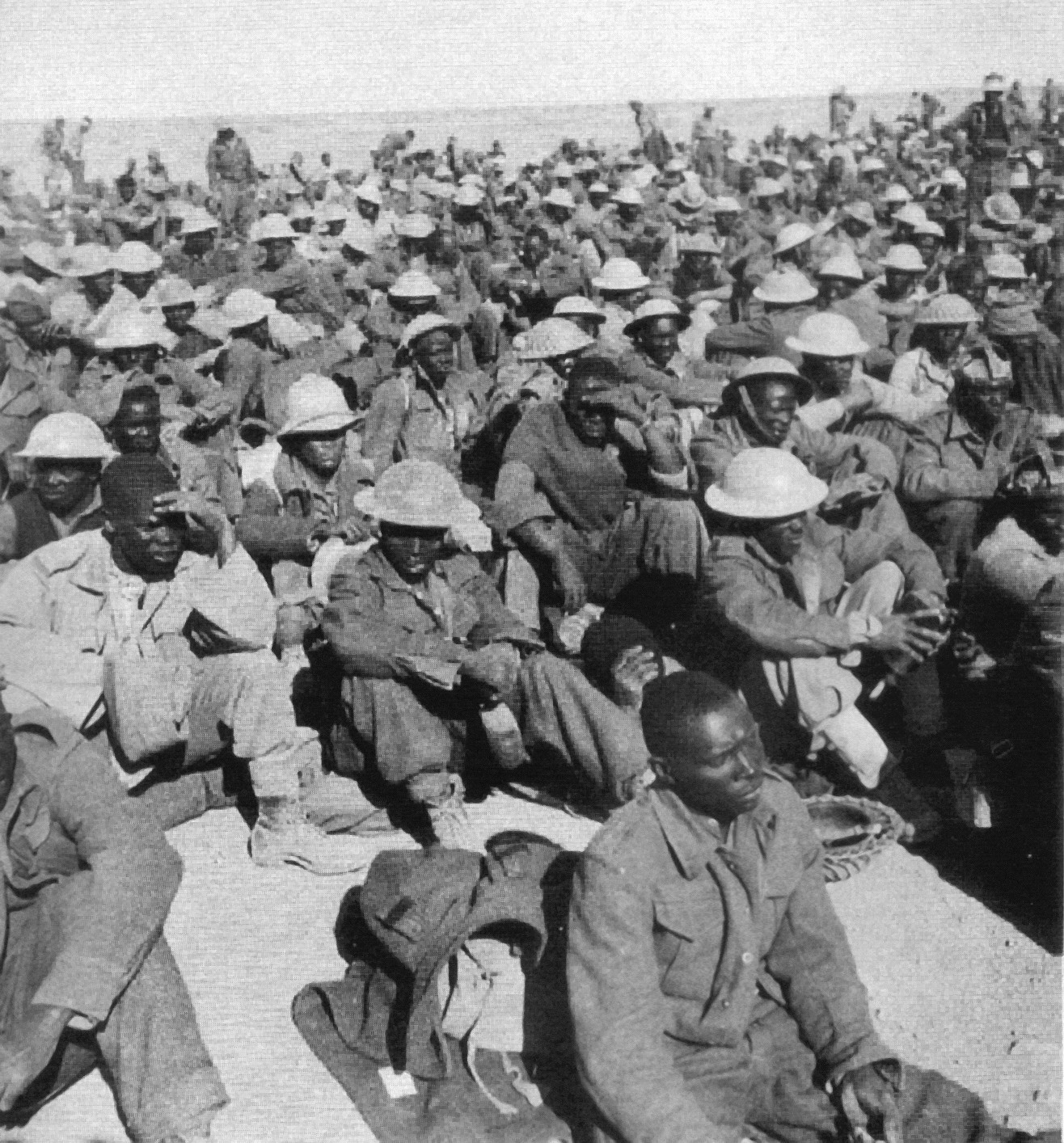
Commonwealth prisoners captured by Italian and German forces in North Africa, 1941

The KAR fought in several campaigns during World War II. It fought against the Italians in Italian East Africa during the East African Campaign, against the Vichy French in Madagascar during the Battle of Madagascar, and against the Japanese in Burma during the Burma Campaign. The Somaliland battalions defended the colony against the Italian invasion of August 1940, but were forced to retreat and evacuate after defeat in the Battle of Tug Argan from 11 to 15 August.

KAR units were deployed as part of the 1st East African Infantry Brigade and the 2nd East African Infantry Brigade. The first brigade was responsible for coastal defence and the second for the defence of the interior. (See 1st SA Infantry Division). By the end of July 1940, two additional East African brigades were formed, the 3rd East African Infantry Brigade and the 6th East African Infantry Brigade. Initially a Coastal Division and a Northern Frontier District Division were planned, but, instead, the 11th African Division and the 12th African Division was formed.

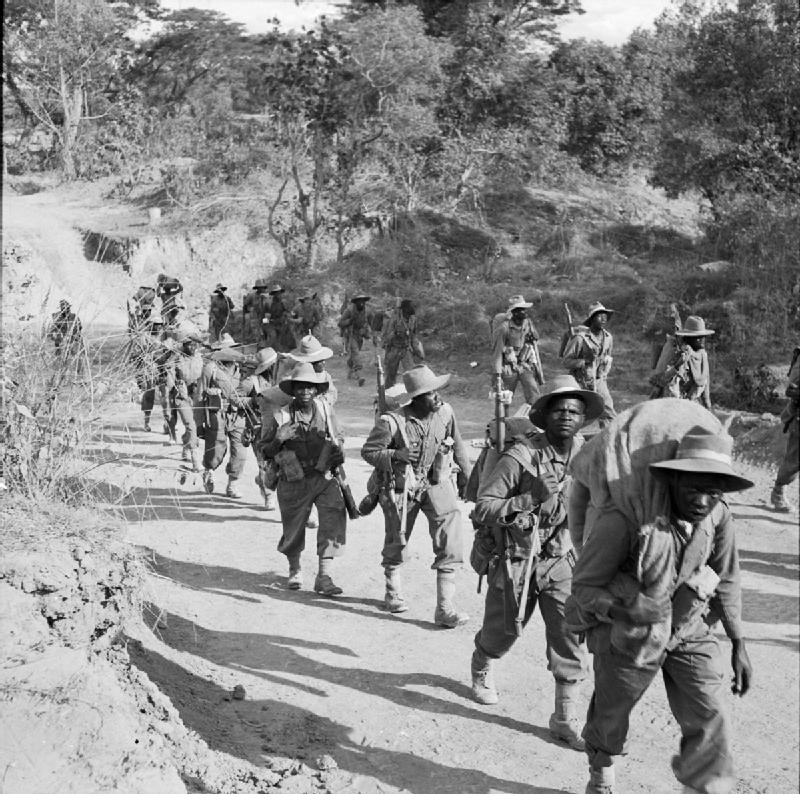
Troops of 11th (East Africa) Division on the road to Kalewa, Burma, during the Chindwin River crossing

The two divisions included East African, Ghanaian, Nigerian, and South African troops. The Ghanaian and Nigerian troops came from the Royal West African Frontier Force. Under the terms of a war contingency plan, a brigade each was provided from the Gold Coast (now Ghana) and from Nigeria for service in Kenya. A Nigerian brigade, together with two East African brigades (the KAR brigades) and some South Africans, formed the 11th African Division. The 12th African Division was similarly formed, but with the Ghanaian brigade instead of the Nigerian brigade. In 1941, during the East African Campaign, Sergeant Nigel Gray Leakey of the 1/6th Battalion was awarded the Victoria Cross (VC).

The 11th African Division was disbanded in November 1941 and the 12th African Division was disbanded in April 1943. In 1943, the 11th (East Africa) Division was formed and it fought in Burma. Two independent infantry brigades were sent from East Africa to India for service in Burma. The 22 (East Africa) Infantry Brigade served in the Arakan in XV Indian Corps, while the 28th (East Africa) Infantry Brigade was in IV Corps, playing a crucial role in the crossing of the Irrawaddy River. By the end of the war, the regiment had raised forty-three battalions (including two in British Somaliland), nine independent garrison companies, an armoured car regiment, an artillery unit, as well as engineer, signal and transport sections.

=== After the Second World War ===
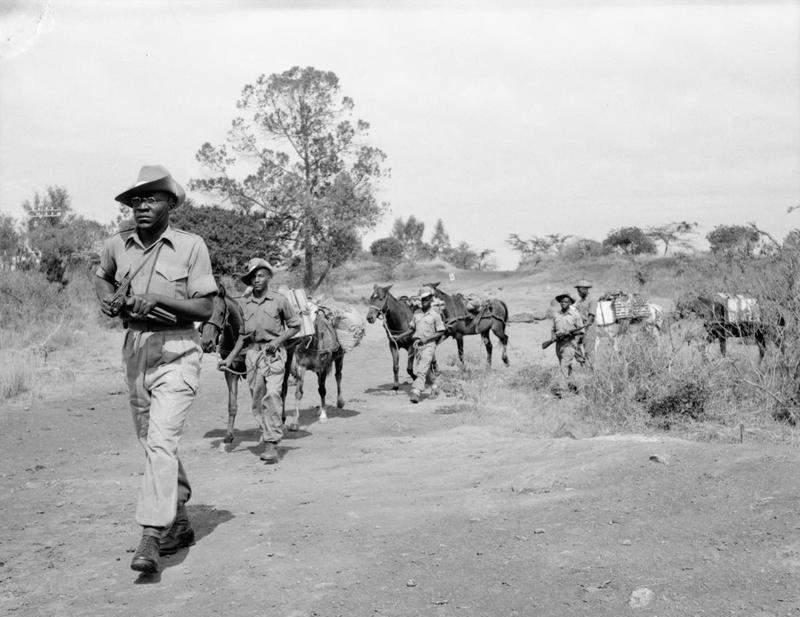
Troops of the King's African Rifles carry supplies on horseback during the Mau Mau Uprising

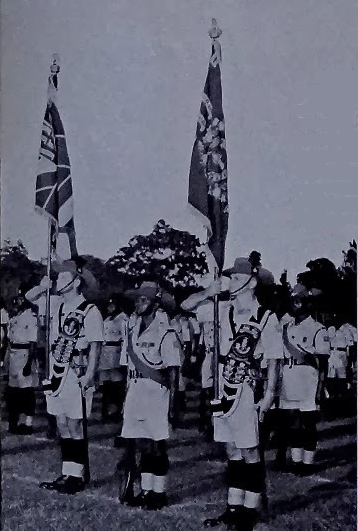
December 1963; Personnel from 2nd Battalion, KAR, parade with their European officers for the final time in the Federation of Rhodesia and Nyasaland

The regiment played a major role in operations during the Mau Mau rebellion in Kenya (1952–1960). In 1952, the 7th (Kenya) Battalion was reformed; it was renumbered as the 11th (Kenya) Battalion in 1956. 2nd/3rd Battalion, a reserve unit, was raised during the military phase of the emergency in Kenya and was under consideration for disbandment by 1957. A company of the regiment perpetrated the Chuka massacre in June 1953.

The 1st, 2nd, and 3rd battalions saw service in the Malayan Emergency, where they were heavily involved in fighting Communist rebels, suffering 23 dead. The regiment was retitled the East African Land Forces in 1957. The last Colonel-in-Chief of the KAR was Queen Elizabeth II.

When the various territories from which the KAR was recruited became independent, the regiment began to break up:

- 1st Battalion – 1st Battalion, Malawi Rifles
- 2nd Battalion – 2nd Battalion, Northern Rhodesia Regiment (subsequently Zambia Regiment)
- 3rd Battalion – 3rd Battalion, Kenya Rifles
- 4th Battalion – 1st Battalion, Uganda Rifles (later formed basis of the Ugandan Army)
- 5th Battalion – 5th Battalion, Kenya Rifles
- 6th Battalion – 1st Battalion, Tanganyika Rifles
- 11th Battalion – 11th Battalion, Kenya Rifles
- 26th Battalion – 2nd Battalion, Tanganyika Rifles

The extent to which KAR traditions influence the modern national armies of the former East African colonies varies from country to country. In Tanzania, a mutiny in 1964 led to a conscious decision to move away from the British military model. In Kenya, on the other hand, the title of Kenya Rifles survives and the various campaigns in which the KAR distinguished itself in both World Wars are still commemorated.

On the island of Mauritius which is off the eastern coast of Africa, a detachment of the King's African Rifles was present until 1960. It was gradually replaced by the newly formed Special Mobile Force (SMF) and Police Riot Unit (PRU).

Only the Kenya Rifles, the Zambia Regiment (as a descendant of the Northern Rhodesia Regiment), and the Malawi Rifles still exist.

== Battle honours ==
The regiment's battalions were not awarded colours until 1924, as colours were not traditionally carried by rifle regiments. The colours had many of the regiment's battle honours emblazoned on it. The old colours were replaced in the 1950s.

- Ashanti 1900 (awarded 1908 for services of The Central Africa Regiment), British Somaliland 1901–04
- The Great War (7 battalions): Kilimanjaro, Narungombe, Nyangao, East Africa 1914–18
- The Second World War: Afodu, Moyale, Todenyang-Namuraputh, Soroppa, Juba, Beles Gugani, Awash, Fike, Colito, Omo, Gondar, Ambazzo, Kulkaber, Abyssinia 1940–41, Tug Argan: British Somaliland 1940, Madagascar, Middle East 1942, Mawlaik, Kalewa, Seikpyu, Letse, Arakan Beaches, Taungup, Burma 1944–45

== List of commanders ==
Inspectors-general

- October 1901 – 1907 Brigadier-General William Henry Manning
- John Gough
- 1909 – 1913 Colonel George Thesiger

== Notable servicemen ==
- Gen. Sir George Giffard (1886–1964) – Served K.A.R. 1913–1919, British Army officer
- Maj-Gen.Joseph Musyimi Lele Ndolo (1919-1984) - Served K.A.R. 1940 - 1961, Kenya Army officer
- Gen. Jackson Mulinge (1924–2014) – Served K.A.R. 1942–1961, Kenya Army officer
- Lt. Gen. Tito Okello Lutwa (1914–1996) – Served K.A.R. 1940–1962, Uganda National Liberation Army (1979–1986), President of Uganda (1985)
- Lt-Gen. David Musuguri (b.1920) – Served K.A.R. 1942–1957, Tanzanian People's Defence Force officer
- Maj-Gen. Sir Freddie de Guingand (1900–1979) – Served K.A.R. 1926–1931, British Army officer
- Maj-Gen. John Butler Walden (1939–2002) – Served K.A.R. 1957–1961, Tanzanian People's Defence Force officer
- Brig-Gen. Shaban Opolot (1924–2005) – Served K.A.R. 1945–1962, Ugandan Army officer
- Brig-Gen. Henry Walker DSO (1874–1953) – Served K.A.R. 1900–1910, British Army officer
- Col. Richard Meinertzhagen (1878–1967) – Served K.A.R. 1902–1906, British intelligence officer and ornithologist
- Lt-Col. Colin Mitchell (1925–1996) – Served K.A.R. 1960s, British soldier and politician
- Peter Garwood (1931–2020), Served K.A.R. 1950–1951, later HM Inspector of Schools
- Lt-Col. Eric Wilson VC (1912–2008) – Served K.A.R. 1937–1946, British Army officer and recipient of the Victoria Cross
- Cpt. Tracy Philipps MC (1888–1959) – Served K.A.R. 1913–1917, British public servant
- Cpt. David Gordon Hines (1915–2000) – Served K.A.R. 1939–1942, British accountant and colonial administrator
- Lt. Idi Amin (1925–2003) – Served 1946–1962, President of Uganda (1971–1979)
- Lt. Roald Dahl (1916–1990) – Served K.A.R. 1939, British novelist and children's author
- Lt. Peter Hopkirk (1930–2014) – Served 1950s, British journalist and historian
- Lt. George Shepperson (1922–2020) – Served 1943–1946, British historian
- 2-Lt. Cyril Taylor (1935–2018) – Served 1954–1956, British educationist and social entrepreneur
- Sgt. Nigel Leakey VC (1913–1941) – Served 1939–1941, British soldier and recipient of the Victoria Cross
- Cpl. Waruhiu Itote (1922–1993) – Served 1942–1945, leading figure of the Mau Mau rebellion
- Robert Fraser (1937–1986) – Served 1950s, British art-dealer
- P. J. Marshall (b.1933) – Served 1950s, British historian
- John Nunneley (1922–2013) – Served 1941–1945, British Army officer and businessman
- John Seymour (1914–2004) – Served 1939–1945, British author and activist
- Sgt. George Smith (1921–2013) footballer

== See also ==
- African Distinguished Conduct Medal
- Band of the King's African Rifles
- Bikaner Camel Corps
- Gold Coast in World War II
- History of Anglo-Egyptian Sudan
- Kenya in World War II
- Kenya Regiment
- KiKAR – Swahili pidgin spoken in British colonial East Africa
- King's African Rifles Long Service and Good Conduct Medal
- Nyasaland in World War II
- Order of Battle, East African Campaign (World War II)
- Rhodesian African Rifles
- Somaliland Camel Corps
- Southern Rhodesia in World War II
- Sudan Defence Force
