= Zanzibar Volunteer Defence Force =

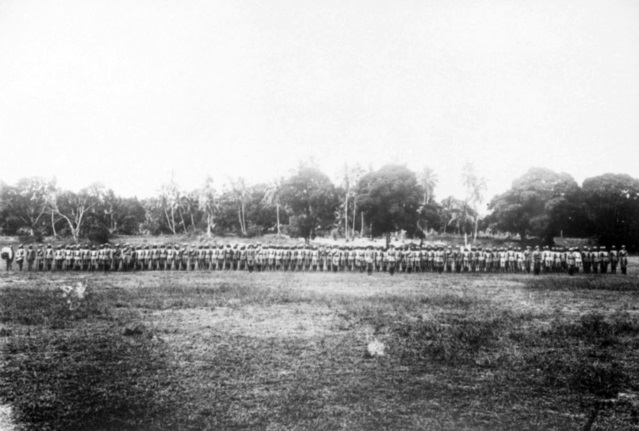
- The Zanzibar Volunteer Defence Force on parade
- Active: 1914–unknown
- Country: Zanzibar
- Allegiance: British Empire
- Type: Infantry
- Engagements: First World War (1914–18); East African campaign

The Zanzibar Volunteer Defence Force was a military unit raised in the British protectorate of Zanzibar during the First World War. It was formed to supplement the Zanzibar garrison after defeat in the 4 November 1914 Battle of Tanga left British forces in the region on the defensive. Though enlistment was voluntary almost the entire able-bodied military-age European population of the protectorate joined the unit. After the British garrison was withdrawn in October 1915 the Zanzibar Volunteer Defence Force and other indigenous units were responsible for the defence of the protectorate.

== Background ==
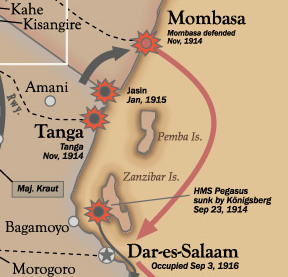
Map showing early actions of the war near Zanzibar

The British Imperial Service Infantry Brigade was defeated in the 4 November 1914 Battle of Tanga of the East African campaign. This put them on the defensive for the following year due to a lack of troops. British West African troops were tied up in the Kamerun campaign and South African forces in the South West Africa campaign. British and Indian troops were also largely unavailable due to commitments in other theatres. British residents in East Africa generally opposed arming native Africans through an expansion of the pre-war King's African Rifles (KAR). They instead banded together in white-only volunteer units such as the Uganda Volunteer Rifles, Northern Rhodesia Rifles, and Nyasaland Volunteer Reserve.

== Unit ==
The Zanzibar Volunteer Defence Force was a development of the Town Guard that had been formed shortly after the start of the war to help the small garrison of one KAR company to defend the protectorate. After the defeat at Tanga the British resident in Zanzibar requested a full battalion of infantry to defend the protectorate; he received four companies of the Gwalior Rifles that had survived the battle. He shortly afterwards reorganised the Town Guard into the Zanzibar Volunteer Defence Force, to supplement the garrison. Enlistment was purely voluntary and open to all military-aged residents of European descent. A history of the war states that "practically every able-bodied member of the small British community" joined the Zanzibar Volunteer Defence Force. The unit was commanded by Captain J. H. Sinclair.

In April 1915 the KAR company was withdrawn from the garrison and they were followed by the Gwalior Rifles in October; Zanzibar was thereafter required to be self-sufficient in defence. Despite the earlier misgivings several new units of African infantry were formed, including the Arab Rifles, East Africa Protectorate Police Battalion, Uganda Police Service Battalion and the Uganda Armed Levies. The Zanzibar Volunteer Defence Force was reinforced by a company of the (African) Zanzibar Armed Constabulary. Men from the police were also formed into the Zanzibar African Rifles, which was later incorporated as the 7th battalion of the KAR; the Mafia Armed Constabulary was also formed at this time.
