= Malabar Volunteer Rifles =

The Malabar Volunteer Rifles was formed in India on 14 August 1885 from the Calicut and Tellicherry Volunteer Corps. It was amalgamated as the 29th Nilgiri Malabar Battalion on 1 April 1917.
