= Chota Nagpur Regiment =

The Chota Nagpur Regiment was raised on 7 August 1891 as the Chota Nagpore Mounted Rifles and was an auxiliary unit of the British Indian Army Cavalry Reserve in the British Indian Army. It was renamed the Chota Nagpur Light Cavalry in 1910, and then again renamed the Chota Nagpur Regiment in 1917 during the First World War, and consisted of both mounted and foot elements. The regiment was disbanded subsequent to India's independence in 1947. Its headquarters were at Ranchi.
