= Bombay Light Horse =

The Bombay Light Horse was raised in 1885 and formed part of Indian Volunteer Force, later (post 1917) the Indian Defence Force and finally (post 1920) the Auxiliary Force (India).

A light horse regiment was roughly equivalent to half a battalion in strength (~ 400 men) and its troops typically fought as mounted infantry rather than traditional cavalry.

It was not mobilized as a unit during World War I or World War II but individuals did serve, mainly with the British Indian Army.

The regiment was disbanded when India became independent in August 1947.
