= Nilgiri Malabar Battalion =

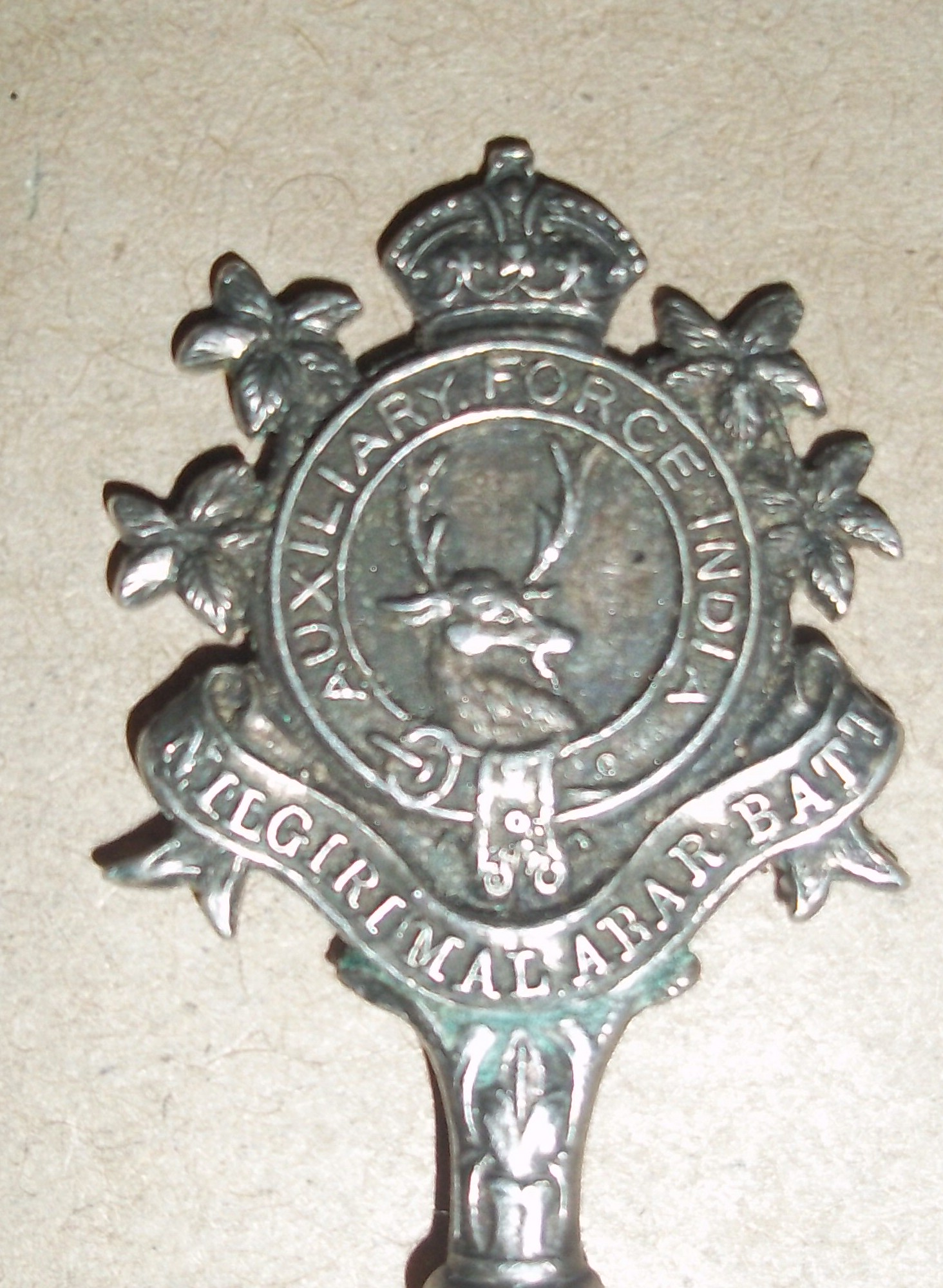
- Nilgiri Malabar Battalion Badge engraving on a spoon
- Active: 1878–1947
- Country: British India
- Allegiance: United Kingdom
- Branch: Auxiliary Force (India)
- Type: Rifle Battalion
- Size: ~ 300 men
- Headquarters: Ootacamund
- Engagements: Moplah Rebellion

The Nilgiri Malabar Battalion (NMB) was an Auxiliary Force (India) of the British Colonial Auxiliary Forces of the British Indian Army, composed of Eurasians/Anglo-Indians. Enrollment in the Auxiliary Force was open to all European British subjects and to persons of European descent. After the Mutiny of 1857, a Volunteer Force was created, whose primary function was to protect British families in India. The Volunteer Force units were later absorbed into the Auxiliary Force India, which was created in 1920 for internal security duties. Its terms of service were similar to the Territorial Army of the UK. The Auxiliary Force India, which provided officers to the Army during World War II, was disbanded in 1947.

== Eurasians of Peninsular India ==
The first Europeans who came to India were the Portuguese, followed by the Dutch, British and the French. In 1498 Portuguese explorer Vasco da Gama landed at Calicut. Calicut was the capital of the Zamorin, the most powerful ruler in south-west India. Portuguese women in the east were few in number, and Portuguese men began to live with local women. The Portuguese, Dutch and British instituted systems of encouraging their men to marry local women, paying a gold mohur for each child born of such unions. This young generation was seen as a cornerstone, a bulwark of empires.

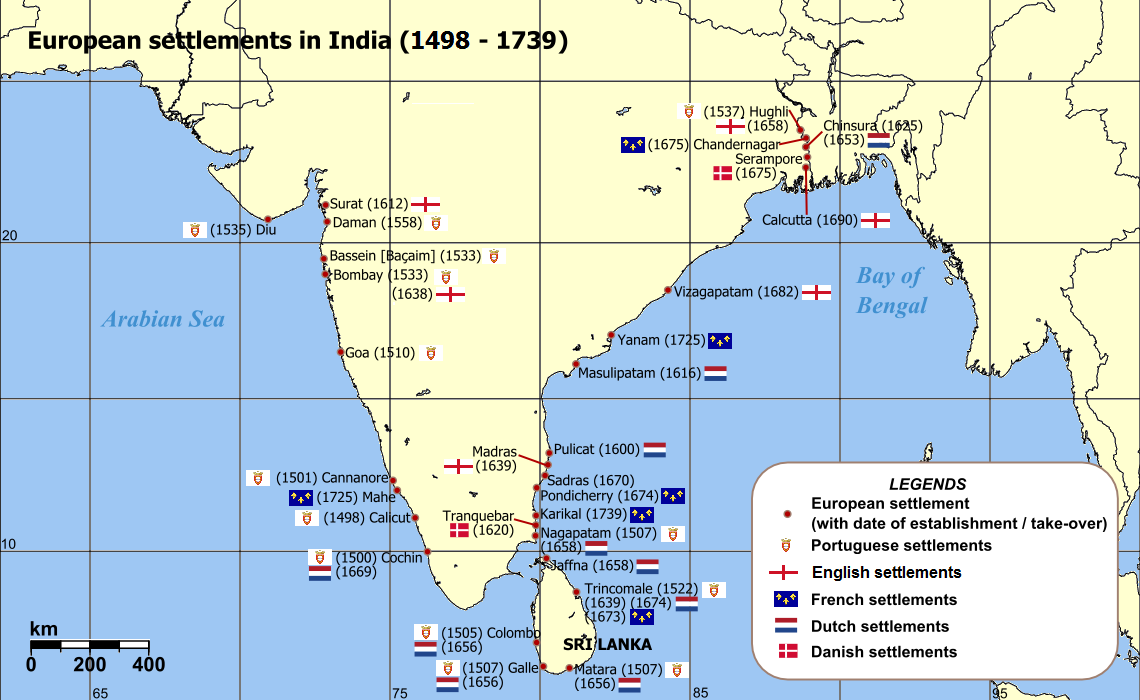
European settlements in India

The Portuguese used the term mestico from about 1546. The British introduced the derisive term half-caste from about 1789. According to Edgar Thurston 'The influence of the various European nations-Portuguese, Dutch, British, Danish, and French-which have at different times acquired territory in peninsular India, is clearly visible in the polyglot medley of Eurasian surnames.' Later in the nineteenth century Eurasian took its place until the official acceptance of Anglo-Indian as the community name in 1911. The descendants of these Eurasians who came to be known as Anglo-Indians constituted the Nilgiri Malabar Battalion.

== Nilgiri and Malabar ==
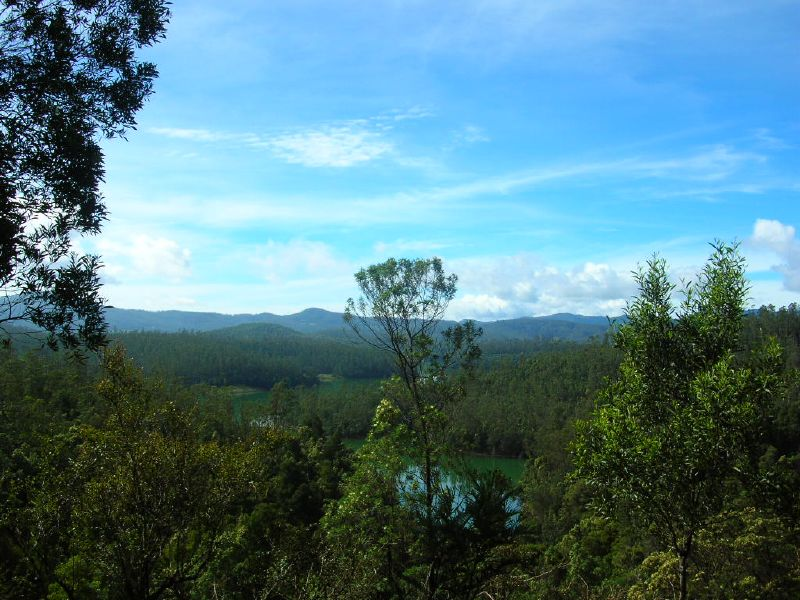
The Nilgiris

Two main mountain systems of Southern India are respectively called the eastern & western ghats, which include between them the great table land of the Deccan and Mysore, and meet at an angle in the Nilgiri Hills. The name Nilgiri or Blue Mountains (nila-giri)is probably derived from the blue haze, which hangs over the hills when viewed from the distant plains. The ghats of the Nilgiris lead to the plains of Malabar and Coimbatore.

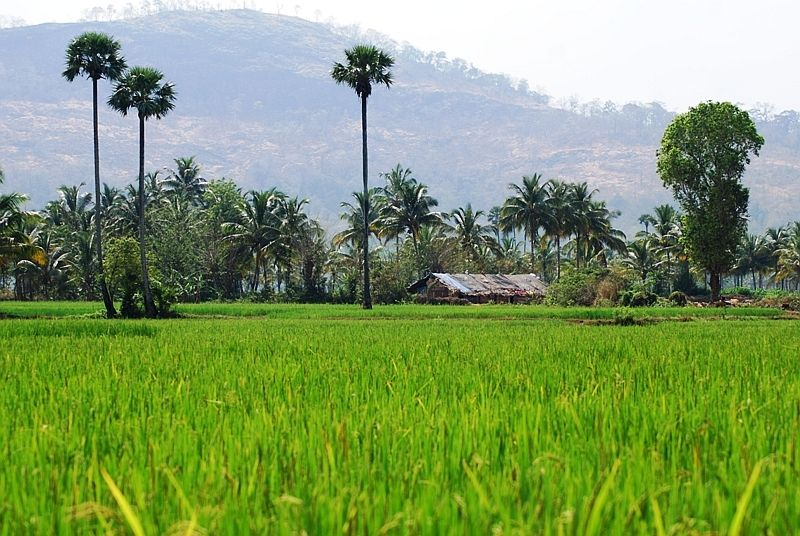
Paddy fields fringed with coconut palms at Palghat in the erstwhile district of Malabar

The name Malabar in Malayalam means the hill country.The first two syllables are almost certainly the ordinary Dravidian word mala (=hill, mountain) and bar is probably the Arabic word barr (=continent) or the Persian word bar (=country). Calicut was the headquarters of the British District of Malabar. The district of the Nilgiris (Nilgiris District) and the district of Malabar (Malabar District) were part of the Madras Presidency.

== Origins ==
Nilgiri Malabar Battalion, Auxiliary Force India No.2480 Pte Ambrose G (Gregory Ambrose) of Cannanore, Efficiency Decorations awarded for meritorious service.

The Volunteer Force in India came into organized existence in 1860. Besides the regular European and Native military forces, the Europeans and Eurasians of civil life formed volunteer regiments. The Nilgiri Malabar Battalion began life as the Nilgiri Volunteer Rifles in October 1878. In 1892 it incorporated the Coimbatore Volunteer Corps (formed August 1885).

Spoons were often awarded as prizes in regimental and other competitions. Some spoons were made of silver, others Electro-Plated Nickel Silver featuring regimental designs. This Spoon awarded to Pte. Edmund Frank Boother of Calicut has the Regimental Sign of the Nilgiri Malabar Battalion, Auxiliary Force, India.

In 1885 the European and Eurasian inhabitants of Calicut organised themselves into two companies of Volunteer Rifles. These companies and others located at Tellicherry, Wayanad and Cochin, with a section at Palghat and numbering altogether about 300 men, were amalgamated into the "Malabar Volunteer Rifles" under a Major Commandant with headquarters at Calicut. With Calicut as its headquarters, the regiment recruited mainly from the populous Eurasian community, and has detachments at Cannanore, Tellicherry and Cochin. The Malabar Volunteer Rifles was formed on 14 August 1885, from the Calicut and Tellicherry Volunteer Corps and was amalgamated as the 29th Nilgiri Malabar Battalion on 1 April 1917. The badge was a stag's head inside a garter inscribed 'Auxiliary Force India'. A crown was above, the wreath was coconut palm and the scroll below read 'Nilgiri Malabar Battalion'. The battalion uniform was khaki and their HQ base was at Ootacamund the headquarters of the Nilgris district.

== Operations ==
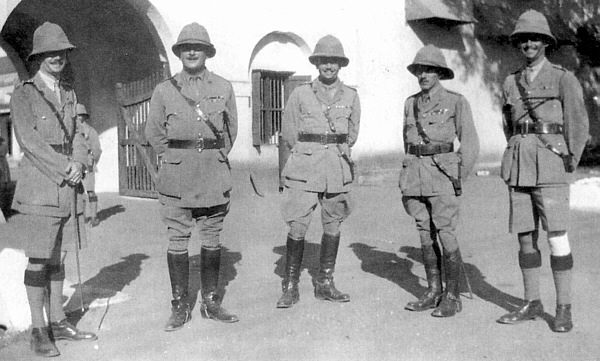
Second Dorsets deployed at Malabar in 1921 jointly with other Auxiliary Forces India, including the Nilgiri Malabar Battalion, quelled the Moplah Rebellion

The Moplah Rebellion, which remained confined to Ernad, Walluvanad and Ponnani taluks of South Malabar, began in August 1921. Following an incident in Pookhottur village a major rebellion broke out with the government deploying the army to take control of the civil administration. Between August and November there were two major battles between the Moplahs and the armed forces. By the end of December 1921, the Moplah Rebellion was completely suppressed. Four officers along with hundred and eighty four men of The Nilgiri Malabar Battalion were part of the armed forces unit that quelled the Moplah Rebellion of 1921. Members of the Cannanore and Tellicherry detachments of the Nilgiri Malabar Battalion took part in a combined Naval and Military exercise in December 1924 at Cannanore. Lord Goschen, Governor of Madras Presidency (1924–29), inspected the annual camp of exercise of the Nilgiri Malabar Battalion at Podanur in 1925. During the Second World War members of the Auxiliary Force (India) continued to function as part-time soldiers while contributing to the war effort by carrying on their normal occupation. The Nilgiri Malabar Battalion was disbanded together with all Auxiliary Force regiments following partition and India's independence in 1947 .
