= Madras Regiment =

Regiment in the Indian Army

The Madras Regiment
- Regimental Insignia of The Madras Regiment
- Active: 1758–present
- Country: British India; India
- Branch: British Indian Army; Indian Army
- Type: Line infantry
- Size: 21 Battalions
- Regimental Centre: Wellington, Udhagamandalam (Ooty), Tamil Nadu
- Motto: Swadharme Nidhanam Shreyaha (It is a glory to die doing one's duty)
- War cry: "Veera Madrassi, Adi Kollu, Adi Kollu, Adi Kollu !" Meaning "O Brave Madrassi, Hit And Kill, Hit And Kill, Hit And Kill !" (The phrase "Adi... Kollu..." took from the war of the Nair army of Travancore Kingdom)
- Decorations: 2 Victoria Crosses; 8 Military Cross; 1 Ashoka Chakra; 5 Maha Vir Chakra; 36 Vir Chakras; 304 Sena Medals; 1 Nao Sena Medal; 15 Param Vishisht Seva Medals; 9 Kirti Chakras; 27 Shaurya Chakras; 1 Uttam Yudh Seva Medal; 2 Yudh Seva Medals; 23 Ati Vishisht Seva Medals; 47 Vishisht Seva Medals; 151 Mention-in-Despatches; 512 COAS's Commendation Cards; 271 GOC-in-C's Commendation Cards; 3 Jeevan Rakshak Padak; 7 COAS Unit Citations; 7 GOC Unit Citation
- Battle honours: Post Independence Tithwal, Punch, Kalidhar, Maharajke, Siramani and Basantar River.
- Website: http://madrasregiment.org

Commanders
- Colonel of the Regiment: Lt Gen Pratik Sharma

Insignia
- Regimental Insignia: An Assaye Elephant posed upon a shield with two crossed swords
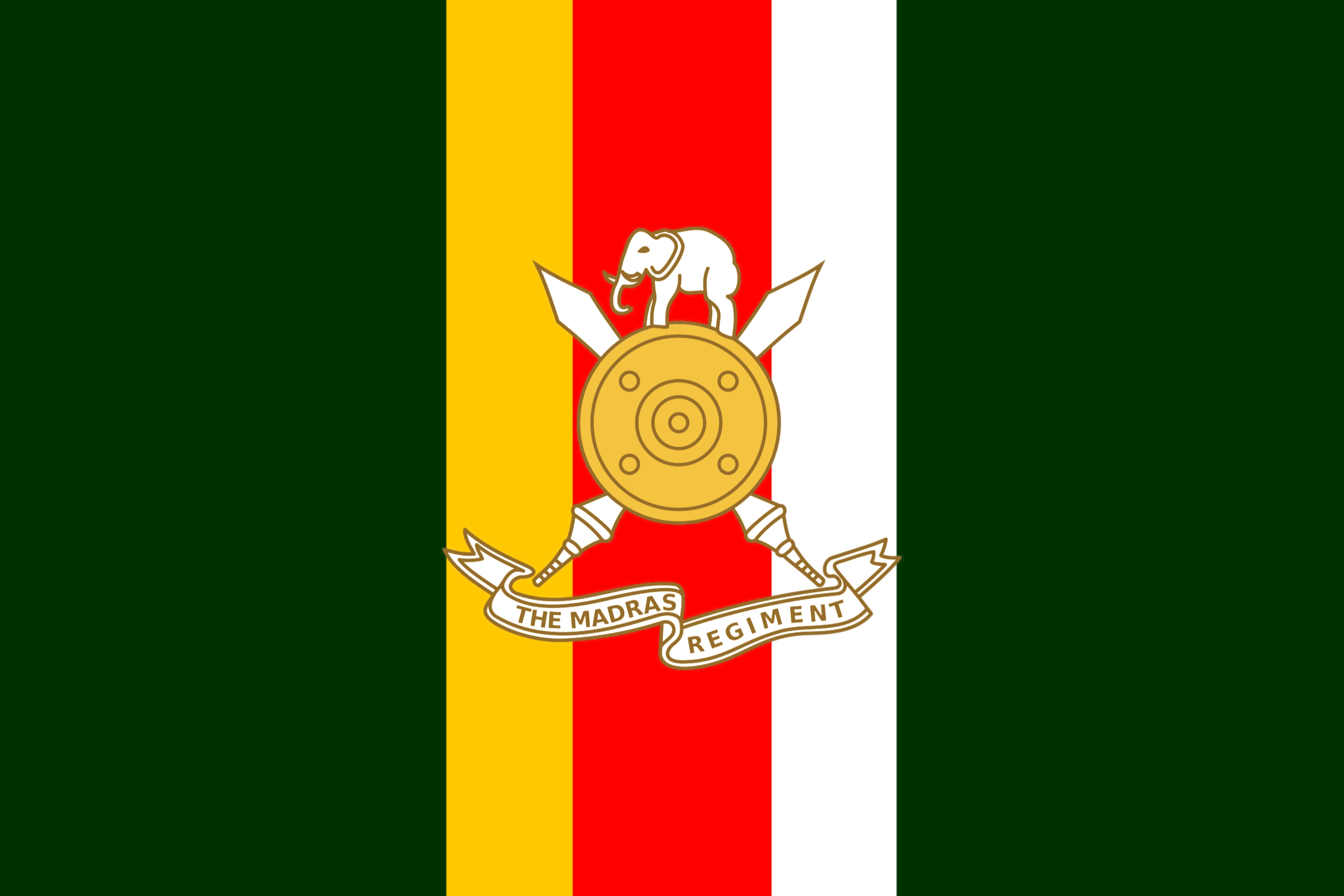
- Flag of The Regiment

The Madras Regiment is the oldest infantry regiment of the Indian Army, originating in the 1750s as a unit of the British East India Company. The regiment took part in numerous campaigns with the British Indian Army and the post-independence Indian Army. The Madras Regiment primarily recruits from the erstwhile Madras state (present-day Tamil Nadu, southern Karnataka, parts of Andhra Pradesh, and northern Kerala) and the Kingdom of Mysore (present-day Karnataka). However, the 9th and 16th battalions (Nair Battalions) were later formed from troops from the kingdoms of Travancore and Cochin in present day Kerala.

== History ==
=== As an East India Company unit ===
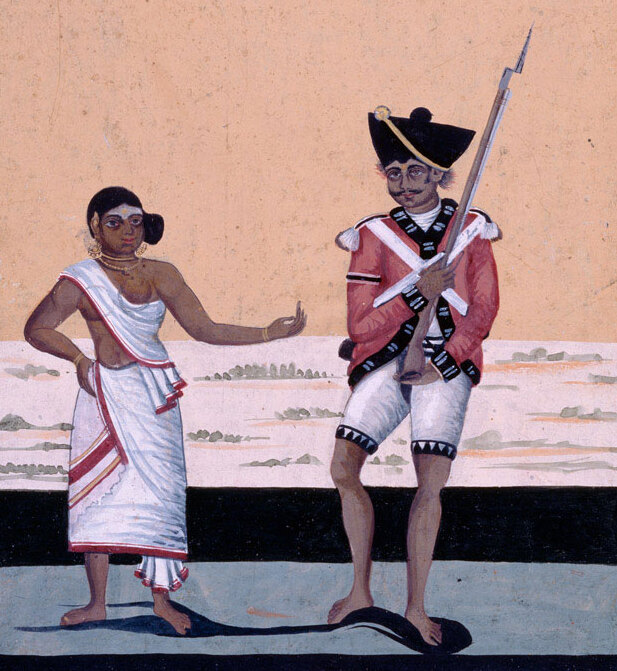
c. 1810 illustration of a Madras Army sepoy and his wife

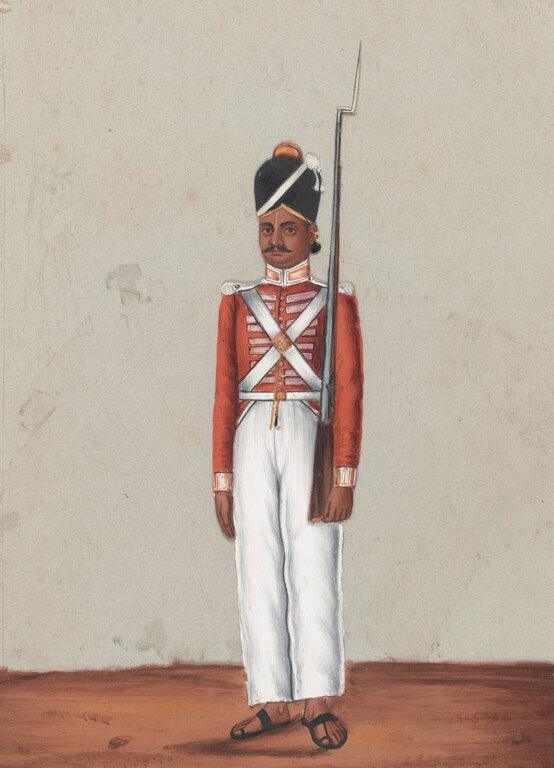
c. 1835 illustration of a Madras Army sepoy

The Madras Regiment was initially formed as the Madras European Regiment in the 1660s by the East India Company, and would see its first action during the First Carnatic war. The first of the sepoy levies were mostly irregulars, consisting of Indo-Portuguese guards, Europeans, and some natives, with no standard issue uniforms or equipment. Unlike the English East India Company, the French Indies Company had begun to recruit and train local Tamil, Telugu, and Malayalam speaking recruits, and would have two regiments of sepoys fully drilled and equipped in the French Manner. In 1746, the newly trained French sepoy regiments under Admiral La Bourdonnais would capture Madras after quickly overwhelming the underequipped garrison.

In 1748, Major Stringer Lawrence, a veteran of action in Spain, Flanders and the Highlands, was hired by the East India Company to take charge of the defence of Cuddalore. Training the levies to become a militia, he formed the Madras Levies into companies, and trained them to become a disciplined fighting force. In 1758, Lawrence raised the Madras Regiment, forming the several Companies of Madras Levies into two battalions. 2 Madras was raised in 1776 as the 15th Carnatic Infantry at Thanjavur (and underwent many name changes thereafter). The original title of these battalions was 'Coast Sepoys'. In 1769, these battalions were numbered and named differently with the battalions in the South being called 'Carnatic' and numbering 1 to 13, while those serving in the North were named 'Circar' and numbered 1 to 6. In 1784, this distinction between 'Carnatic' and 'Circar' was abolished and they were henceforth known as 'Madras' battalions. In 1796, the units were numbered 1st to 50th Madras Native Infantry. In 1891, the word 'Native' was dropped.

In August 1758, they were formed into regular companies of 100 men each with a due proportion of Indian officers, havildars, naiks, etc. and in December of that year the first two battalions were formed with a European subaltern to each company and a captain to command the whole. (These officers were mostly seconded from the King's service with a step-in rank. They were of a better class, better educated and above all had far more military experience than the company's officers).

The regiment has been through many campaigns with the Madras Army, British Indian Army and Indian Army. Many well-known British officers have commanded this regiment, among them Robert Clive, and Arthur Wellesley, the later Duke of Wellington. This regiment fought in the Carnatic wars, which were fought in South India. The elephant crest symbolises its gallantry in the Battle of Assaye.

The Madras sepoys fought in a majority of the East India Company's campaigns in the subcontinent. The regiment fought alongside Robert Clive at the Siege of Arcot, and would later fought under him in Battle of Plassey. The regiment saw action against the French during all of the Carnatic Wars, and fought in several campaigns against native rulers like Hyder Ali, his son Tipu Sultan, and the Polygars such as Puli Thevan, Dheeran Chinnamalai, Maruthu brothers, Kattabomman, Pazhassi Raja, etc. At its zenith in the 1800s, the regiment consisted of 52 battalions. The regiment saw many overseas deployments during this period, such as the First Anglo-Burmese War, First Opium War of 1839-42, and the Second Anglo-Burmese War of 1852-54. A contingent of the regiment would even land in Egypt in 1801 under David Baird, to fight the French during their invasion of Egypt, but never saw action.

=== Under the British Crown ===
The regiment played an important role in suppressing the Revolt of 1857 in Lucknow and Central India, going on to serve in the Second Anglo-Afghan War of 1879-80, Third Anglo-Burmese War of 1885-87 and the Boxer Rebellion in China in 1900. The coming of the British rule and merging of the Presidency armies into a British Indian Army led the erstwhile regiments to be reorganised. After conquest of India, the main perceived threat to British was from Russia. So, recruitment was re-oriented towards north Indians of Punjab and Nepal. This resulted in the British reducing the strength of the Madras Regiment, since the southern borders were relatively peaceful. As part of this change, seventeen Madras regiments, were converted into Punjab and Gorkha regiments between 1890 and 1903. They were renamed the 1st, 2nd and 8th Punjab and 1/7th and 1/10th Gorkha Rifles.

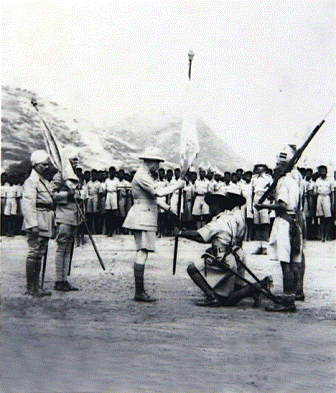
The Marquess of Linlithgow presenting new colours of Madras Regiment ,1942

By the time of World War I, the once large regiment was left with eight Carnatic Regiments, the 63rd, 73rd, 75th, 79th, 80th, 83rd, 86th and 88th. These battalions were with a reduced strength of 600 men, as they were intended to perform duties of garrison troops only. During 1917-18, eight additional battalions were raised. In 1922, the regiment was allotted one regiment each of Pioneers and Infantry. During the re-organisation of the Indian Army in 1922, the regiments were numbered according to their seniority. The 1st and 2nd Punjab Regiments, which ironically were raised from senior Madras Regiment battalions were given precedence and the regiment was renamed as 3rd Madras Regiment. Following the great war, nearly the whole of the regiment was disbanded between 1922 and 1928. What remained were four Indian Territorial Force (ITF) and one University Training Corps battalions. This decline was arrested in 1941, when Sir Arthur Hope, the then Governor of Madras put in efforts to revive the regiment. The ITF battalions were converted to regular ones and new ones raised. A training centre was raised at Madukkarai in Coimbatore district in July 1942. After many years, the regiment was re-raised with fresh recruits and a draft of troops from the Queen's own Sappers and Miners (Madras Paraiyar Regiment) and the Madras Sappers during World War II. The newly reborn Madras Regiment performed very creditably during the Burma Campaign. In 1947, the numeral ‘3’ was dropped from the name of the regiment and it came to be known by its present name.

=== Post Independence ===
After independence, the infantry battalions of the Travancore "Nair Pattalam", Cochin and Mysore State forces were amalgamated

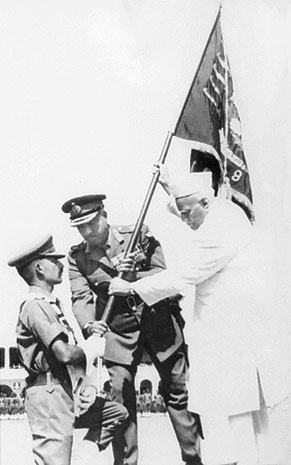
9 Madras being presented the President's Colours by the then President V. V. Giri in 1970

into the Madras Regiment. This included what is now the 9th Battalion, which is the oldest battalion of the Regiment (and thus the Indian Army). It was formerly known as the Nair Brigade (Nair Pattalam/"Nair Army"). This militia was raised in 1704 at Padmanabhapuram as body guards for the Maharajah of Travancore, and saw action in the Battle of Colachel by defeating the Dutch forces. The army was made up of soldiers from Nair warrior clans, however after the 1940s, non-Nairs were permitted to join. The "Nair Army" became incorporated into the Indian Army in April 1951.

Post-independence saw the consolidation of the Regiment and re-affirmation of the versatility and valour of the South Indian troops, when the battalions of the Regiment fought fierce battles during the 1947–48 Jammu & Kashmir Operations, the 1962 Sino-Indian Conflict, the Indo-Pak Wars of 1965 and 1971 and Operation Pawan in 1987–89 as a part of the IPKF.

== Class composition ==
The regiment still recruits heavily from Tamil Nadu, Kerala, Karnataka, Telangana and Andhra Pradesh with a slight majority of Tamil- and Malayalam-speaking recruits. Drill commands by NCOs are commonly given in Tamil or Malayalam. However, since the 1990s the percentage from Kannadiga and Telugu speaking recruits has increased, commands are also given through Telugu and Kannada. As is the practice in all the army, the officers of the regiment can be from any part of India.

== Crest and uniform ==
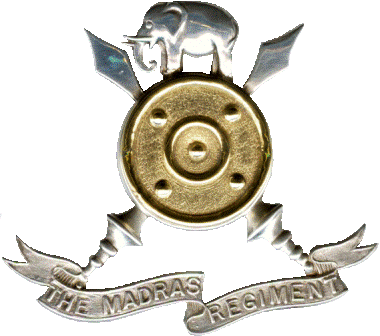
Regimental Crest

The present Crest of the Madras Regiment consists of the Assaye Elephant surmounting a pair of Malabar swords with a shield at the crossing, and a scroll below inscribed 'THE MADRAS REGIMENT'. It is bi-metallic, the shield being in brass and the rest in white chrome. The elephant faces west as seen from the front, and has an arched back, a slightly curved trunk, tusks pointing upwards, and a sagging belly, with the tuft of the tail resting at the rear edge of its left thigh. The Assaye Elephant was sanctioned as a special honour-badge to the 2nd, 4th, 8th, 10th and 24th Madras Infantry following the victory at the Battle of Assaye in 1803.

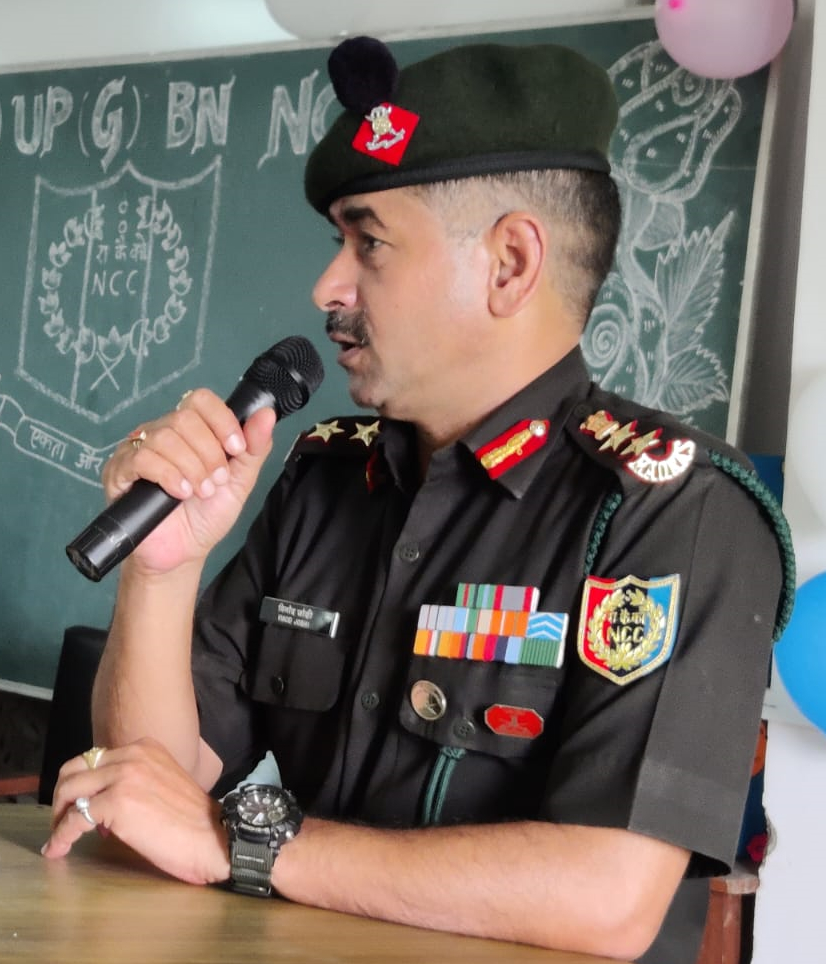
An Officer in the regimental uniform

During the Victorian era, European officers within the Madras regiments largely followed British regulations, as photographic evidence and surviving uniforms conform to the standard British pattern tunics, including but not limited to the 1856, 1867, and 1881 pattern officer's tunics. The transition from coatee to tunic is believed to have taken place from January 1856 onwards, as Dress Regulations of the army dictate that tunics were to be purchased once coatees had been worn. Regimental facings were often regimentally specific; for example, the 27th Madras regiment wore scarlet tunics with yellow facings, and the buttons were gilt with the battle honor 'Mahdipore'. European officers at first in the 1850's wore the 'Air Tube Styled' tropical helmet but later transitioned to the official pattern Foreign Service Helmet with a regimentally specific puggaree.

The present uniform of the Madras Regiment includes a green lanyard on the left shoulder and the shoulder title Madras (brass / green letters over scarlet background). The green beret (common to all infantry units in India) has the regimental crest on a scarlet diamond base stitched to the beret and a black pom pom. The latter, a black woollen ball, is unique to the Regiment and it gives a distinct identification. It was adopted on 7 January 1949 following a proposal by the then Commanding Officer of 4 Madras (WLI) - Lieutenant Colonel MK Sheriff. The regimental turban is worn by personnel during ceremonial occasions, parades, on guard duty and by those in the regimental band. It was adopted in November 1979 and consists of a dark green background with yellow, scarlet and white stripes. On the left of the wearer is a yellow silken jhallar with the same stripes. On the front top is a black pom pom and below is the regimental crest on a scarlet background.

== Motto, War cry and Salutation ==
The motto of the regiment is from chapter 3, verse 35 of Bhagavad Gita. It is स्वधर्मे निधनं श्रेय: (Swadharme Nidhanam Shreyaha), which translates to “It is glory to die doing one’s duty”. The motto was adopted 8 June 1955. The war cry of the regiment is “Veera madrassi, adi kollu, adi kollu, adi kollu !”, which means “O brave Madrassi, hit and kill, hit and kill, hit and kill !”. This was adopted during the Battalion Commanders’ Conference in 1969. The salutation used by the regiment is ‘Namaskaram’. It was adopted by 4 Madras (WLI) in 1956 and subsequently adopted by all the battalions.

== Madras Regimental Centre and Records ==
The Madras Regimental Centre is presently located in Wellington and is commanded by an officer of the rank of Brigadier. The centre traces its history to the raising of the 36 Madras Battalion at Tanjore in 1794. The unit has been subsequently designated as 2/13 Madras Native Infantry (1798), 26 Madras Native Infantry (1824), 86th Carnatic Infantry (1903) and 10/3rd Madras Regiment (1922) it was subsequently placed under suspended animation. The Centre was re-raised at Madukkarai as the 3rd Madras Regiment - Recruits Training Centre on 19 July 1942. The centre received the colours of old 10/3rd Madras Regiment on 23 September 1942 (Assaye Day).

The centre relocated from Madukkarai to its present location in Wellington in February 1947. It occupied the Wellington barracks, which were built between 1852 and 1860. The Wellington barracks was subsequently renamed Shrinagesh Barracks after independence. The museum of Madras Regimental Centre is located in the Shrinagesh Barracks Complex and was inaugurated in 1993. The Madras Regiment Record Office was formed in Madukkarai in October 1942 and moved to Wellington in 1947.

== Band ==
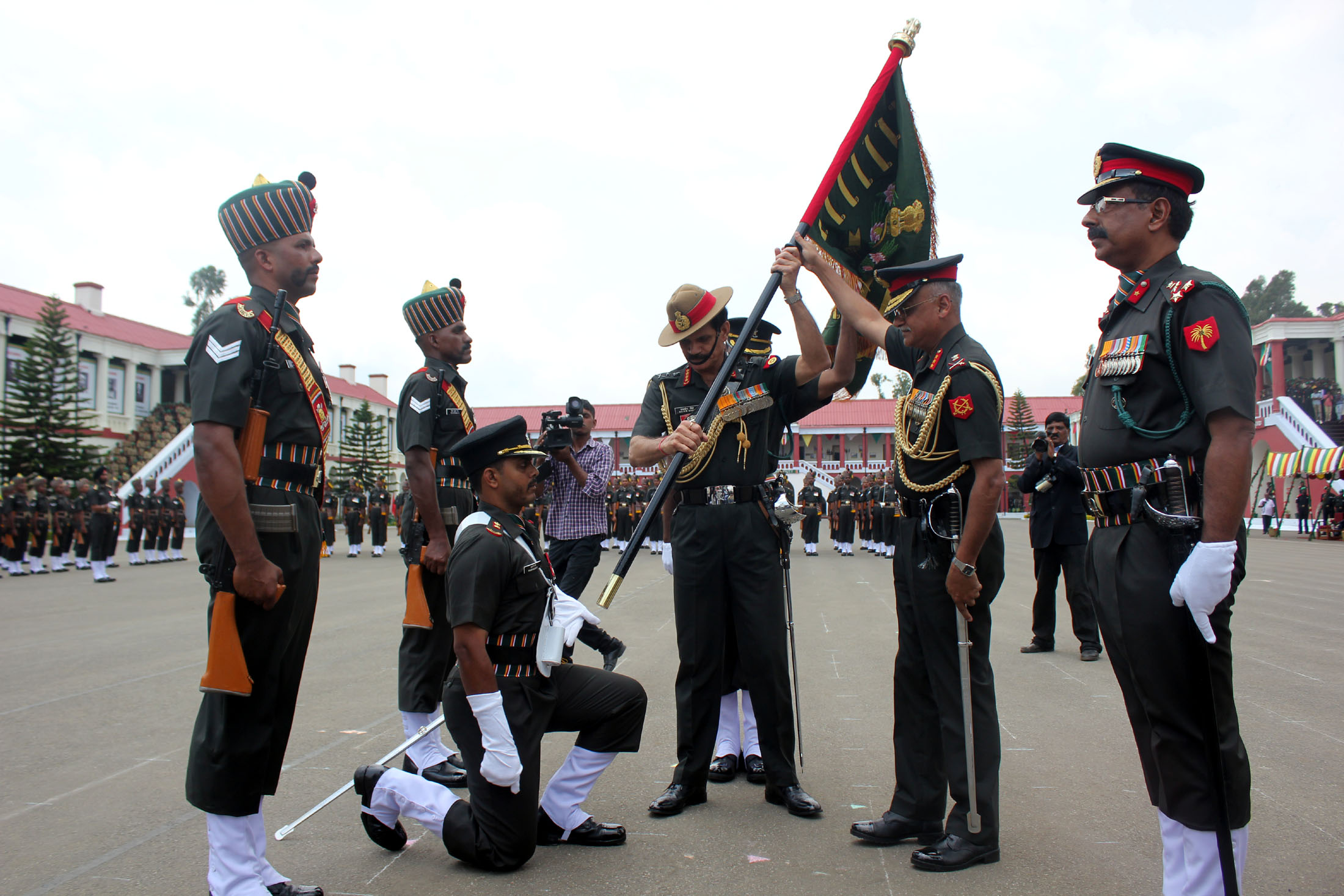
The Chief of Army Staff, General Dalbir Singh presenting the President’s Colours to 21 Madras Battalion on April 05, 2015

The Madras Regiment Band a full-time military band, that serves as part of the Madras Regimental Centre in Wellington, Tamil Nadu. It was raised in 1951 purely as a brass band and has evolved over the years to become a symphonic band as well. Today, it consists of a concert band, a brass band and a percussion section. It performs at arrival ceremonies for state visits as well as state dinner hosted at the Rashtrapati Bhavan by the President of India, as well as regimental and community events.

== Regimental tribute ==
Let those who come after, see to it that these names be not forgotten,
For they who at the call of duty, left all that was dear to them,
Endured hardships, faced dangers, and finally passed out of sight of men,
In the path of duty and self-sacrifice, Giving their lives that we might live in freedom.

== Current strength ==
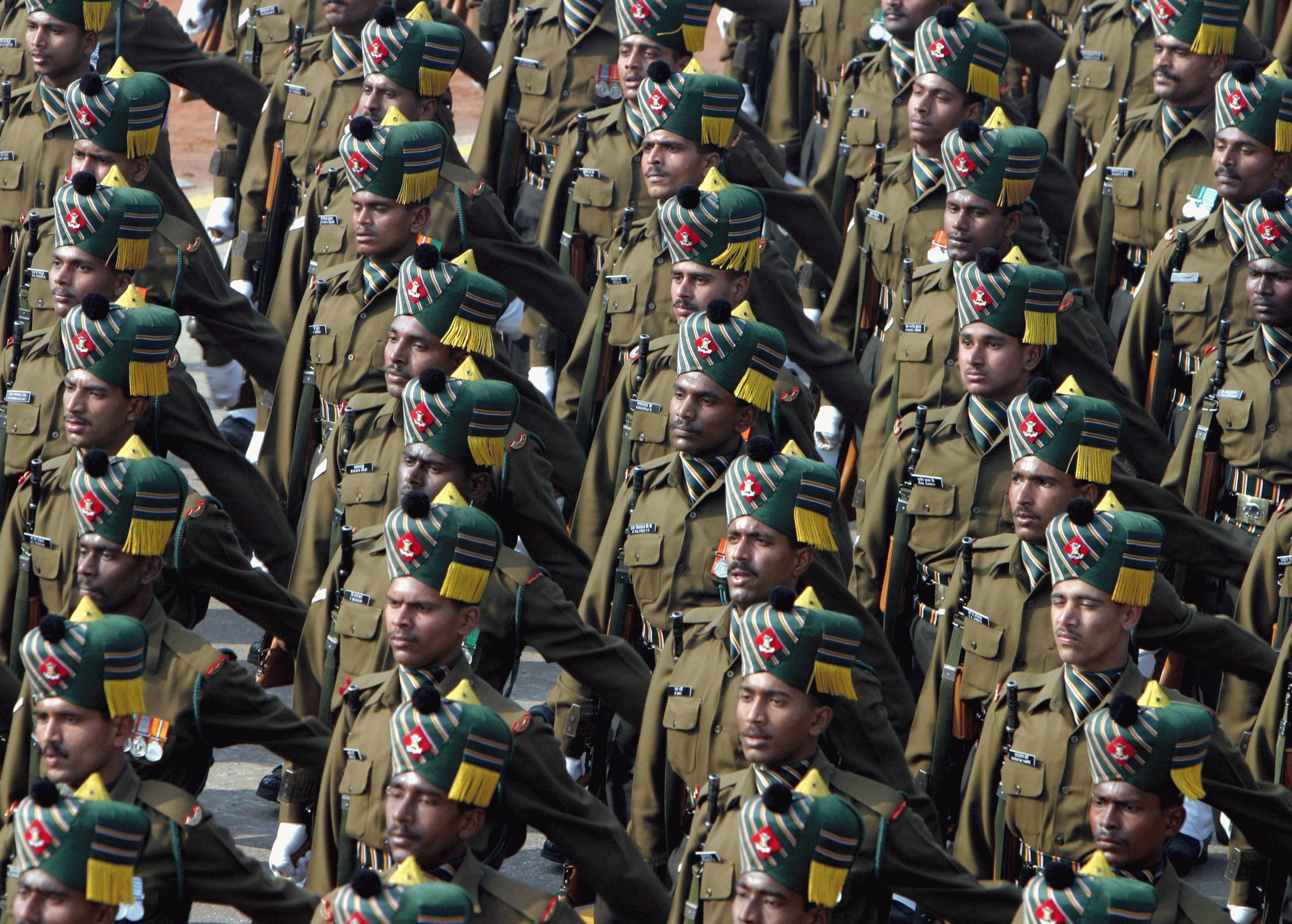
The Madras Regiment marching during the Republic Day Parade, 2013

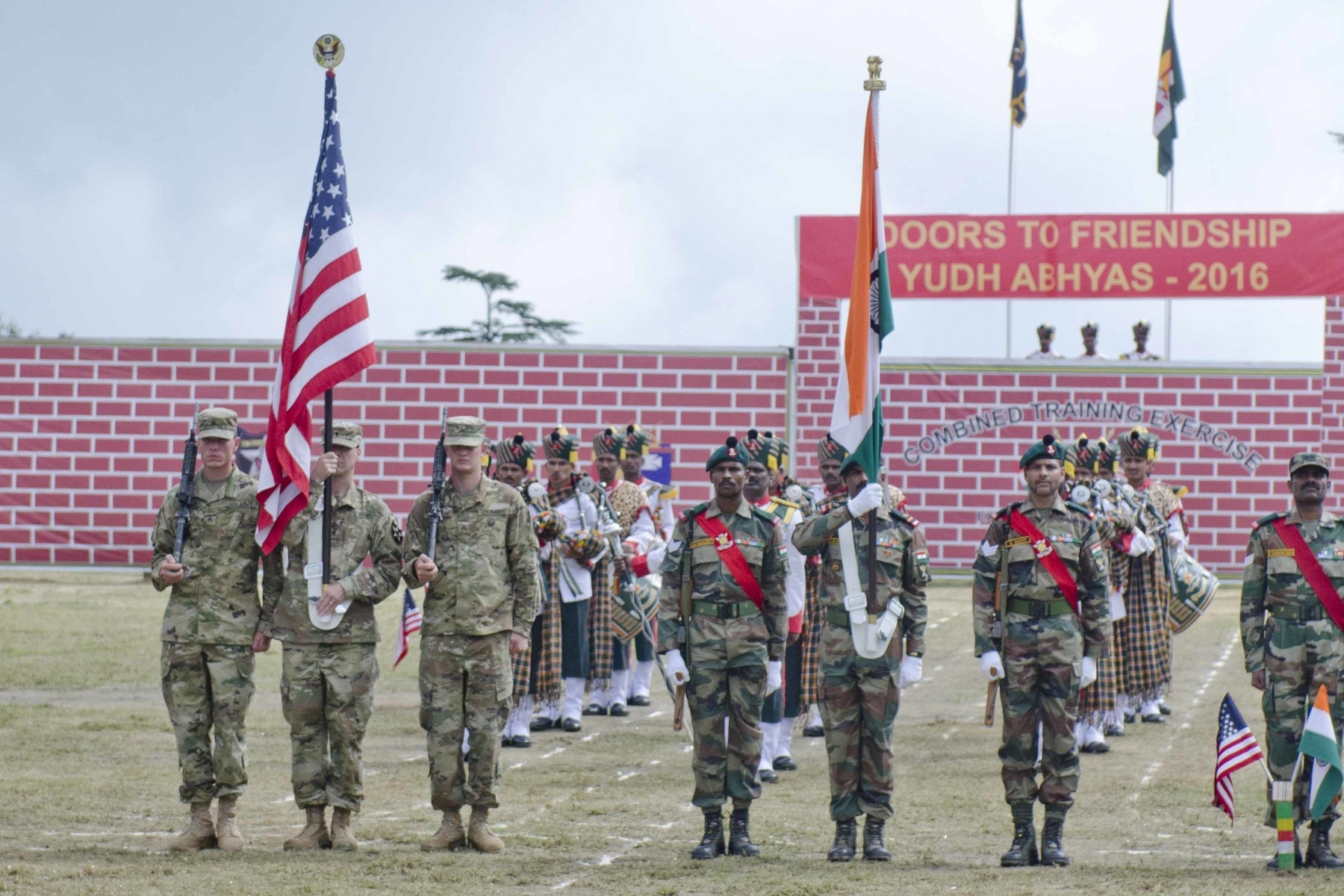
U.S. soldiers (left) and Indian soldiers of 12 Madras hold their respective country's national flags during Exercise Yudh Abhyas, 2016.

The list consists of 21 battalions, four Rashtriya Rifles battalions and three Territorial Army battalions.

Battalion	Raising Date	Former designations	Battle honours	Remarks
1st Battalion §	1776	13th Carnatic Battalion (1776); 2/3rd Madras Native Infantry (1796); 13th Madras Infantry (1885); 73rd Carnatic Infantry (1903); 11th Madras Infantry ITF (1933); 1st Battalion, The Madras Regiment (1942)	Carnatic, Sholinghur, Mysore, Seringapatam, Burma 1885-87, Mount Popa, Tithwal, Kalidhar	Re-organised as a mechanised infantry regiment in 1969 and joined Mechanised Infantry Regiment in 1979.
2nd Battalion	1776	15th Carnatic Battalion (1776); 2/4th Madras Native Infantry (1796); 15th Madras Infantry (1885); 75th Carnatic Infantry (1903); 2nd Battalion, 3rd Madras Regiment (1922 and 1940); 2nd Battalion, The Madras Regiment (1942)	Carnatic 1780-84, Sholinghur, Mysore 1790-92, Afghanistan 1879-80, Burma 1885-87, Mesopotamia 1916-18	Disbanded in 1926 and re-raised in September 1940 from 12th Malabar Battalion ITF, was a Para battalion between 1946 and 1950. Nicknamed Goondas.
3rd Battalion	1777	20th Carnatic Battalion (1777); 2/7th Madras Native Infantry (1796); 19th Madras Infantry (1885); 79th Carnatic Infantry (1893); 3rd Battalion Madras Regiment (1922); 1st (Territorial) Battalion; 79 Carnatic Infantry (1922); 13th (Malabar) Battalion, 3rd Madras Regiment (1922); 13th Malabar Battalion ITF (1929); 3rd Battalion Madras Regiment (1941)	Carnatic, Sholinghur, Mysore, Seringapatam, Pegu, Central India, Mesopotamia	Disbanded and re-raised as a Territorial Army battalion in 1922, disbanded in 1950 and re-raised in 1962.
4th Battalion	1794	33rd Madras Native Infantry (1794); 1/12th Madras Native Infantry (1796); 23rd Wallajahabad Light Infantry (1824); 83rd Wallajahabad Light Infantry (1903); 1st Battalion, 3rd Madras Regiment (WLI) (1922); 4th Battalion, 3rd Madras Regiment (1942); 4th Battalion (WLI), The Madras Regiment	Seringapatnam 1799, Nagpore, Burma 1885-1887, East Africa, Mesopotamia, Baghdad, Persia, Tamu Road, Ukhrul, Ava, Kama, Punch, Maharajke	Disbanded in 1923, re-raised in 1942.
5th Battalion	1759	4th Battalion, Coastal Sepoys (1759); 3rd Carnatic Battalion (1770); 1/3rd Madras Native Infantry (1796); 63rd Palamcottah Light Infantry (1903); 5th Battalion, 3rd Madras Regiment (1943)		Disbanded 1922, re-raised 1943, disbanded 1947, re-raised 1963. Nicknamed Ferocious Five.
6th Battalion	1777	21st Carnatic Battalion (1777); 2/2nd Madras Native Infantry (1796); 20th Madras Native Infantry (1824); 20th Madras Infantry (1885); 80th Carnatic Infantry (1903); 6th Battalion, 3rd Madras Regiment (1943)	Carnatic, Sholinghur, Mysore, Seringapatnam 1799 , Basantar	Disbanded in 1921, re-raised in 1943, disbanded 1947, re-raised 1963.
7th Battalion	1798	2/14th Madras Native Infantry (1798); 28th Madras Native Infantry (1824); 28th Madras Infantry (1885); 88th Carnatic Infantry (1903); 7th Battalion, 3rd Madras Regiment (1943)	Mahidpore, Nagpore, Ava, China 1900	Disbanded in 1921, re-raised in 1943, disbanded 1946, re-raised 1964. Nicknamed Shandaar Saat.
8th Battalion	1948			Nicknamed Gallant Guerrillas.
9th Battalion	1704	1st Battalion, Nair Brigade (1830); 1st Battalion, Travancore Nair Infantry (1835); 9th Battalion, The Madras Regiment (Travancore) (1948)	Burki, Punjab 1965	Former Princely State Forces Unit, Travancore.
10th Battalion	1984			
11th Battalion	1980			Old Territorial Battalion.
12th Battalion	1981			Old Territorial Battalion, nicknamed Bahadur Barah.
16th Battalion	1819	2nd Battalion, Travancore Nair Infantry (1819); 16th Battalion, The Madras Regiment (Travancore) (1954)	Basantar	Former Princely State Forces Unit, Travancore.
17th Battalion	1943	Nair Brigade (1860), Cochin State Infantry (1943); 17th Battalion, The Madras Regiment (Cochin) (1953)		Former Princely State Forces Unit Cochin.
18th Battalion	1859	1st Mysore Infantry (1895); 18th Battalion, The Madras Regiment (Mysore) (1953)		Former Princely State Forces Unit Mysore.
19th Battalion	1777	20th Carnatic Battalion (1777); 1/7th Madras Native Infantry (1796); 19th Madras Native Infantry (1824); 19th Madras Infantry (1885); 79th Carnatic Infantry (1903); 3rd Battalion, 3rd Madras Regiment (1922); 19th Battalion, the Madras Regiment (1966)		Disbanded 1923, re-raised 1942, disbanded 1950, re-raised 1966.
20th Battalion	2009			Nicknamed The Mighty Twenty.
21st Battalion	2011			
25th Battalion	1942	25th Battalion, 3rd Madras Regiment (1942)		Raised as a garrison battalion, disbanded in 1946, re-raised in 1966.
26th Battalion	1942	26th Battalion, 3rd Madras Regiment (1942)	Siramani	Raised as a garrison battalion, disbanded in 1946, re-raised in 1967. Nicknamed Tuskers Battalion and Ashok Chakra Paltan.
27th Battalion	1943	27th Battalion, 3rd Madras Regiment (1943)	Maheidpore	Raised as a garrison battalion, disbanded 1946. Re-raised 1971.
28th Battalion	1942	3rd Coastal Defence Battalion (1942)		Raised in 1942, disbanded in 1946, re-raised in 1976.
8 Rashtriya Rifles				
25 Rashtriya Rifles	1994			
38 Rashtriya Rifles				
54 Rashtriya Rifles				
110th Infantry Battalion (TA)	1949			Territorial Army battalion situated in Coimbatore, Tamil Nadu.
122nd Infantry Battalion (TA)	1949	51st Light Armoured Regiment (TA) (1949); 122nd Infantry Battalion (TA) (1956)		Territorial Army battalion situated in Kannur, Kerala, was previous affiliated to the Punjab Regiment.
172nd Infantry Battalion (TA)	2017			Territorial Army battalion situated in Port Blair, Andaman & Nicobar Islands.

§ indicates former units.
The battle honours in italics indicate those awarded prior to the independence of India.

== Campaigns and Battles ==
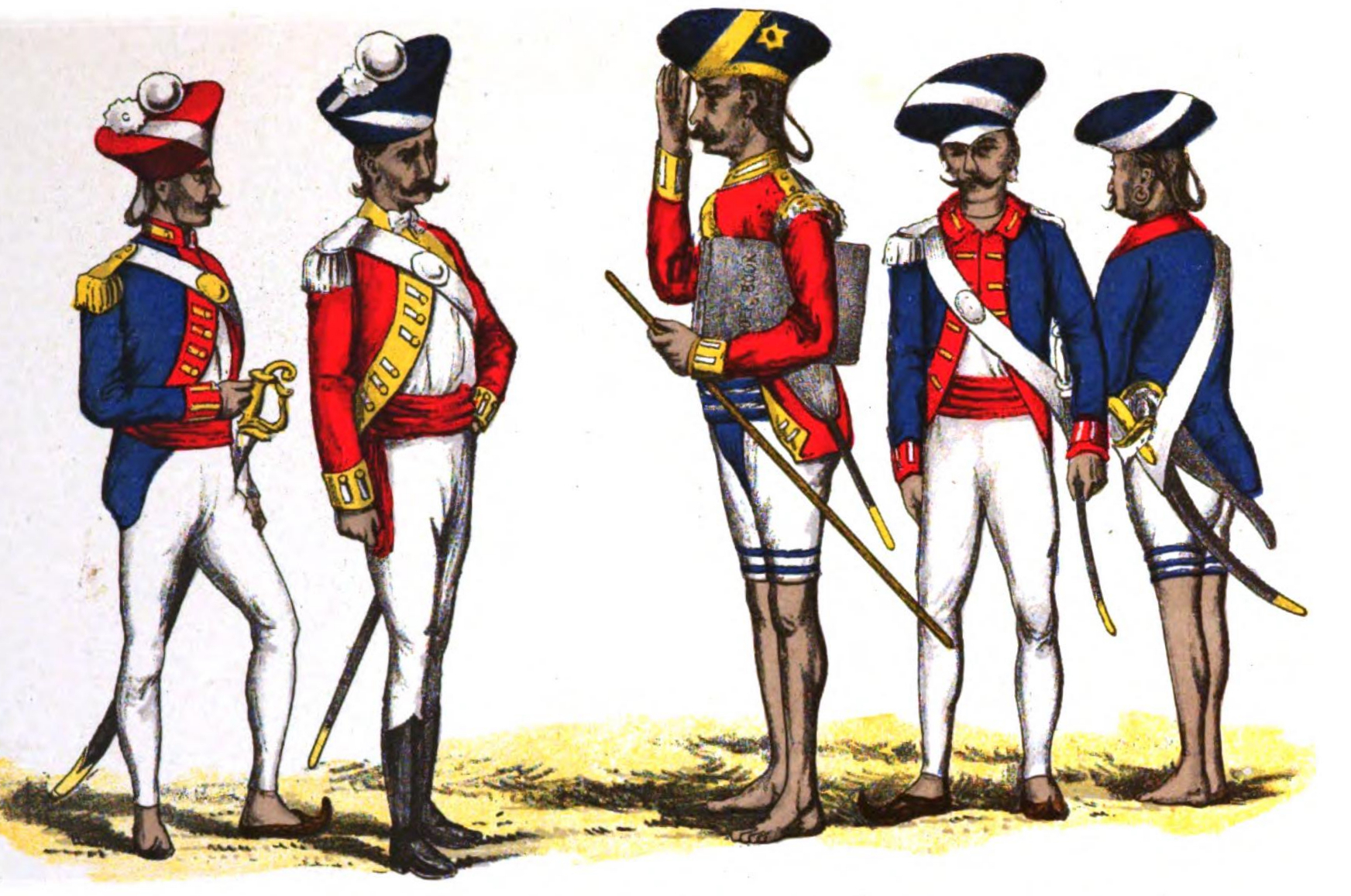
Native officers, NCOs and Sepoys of Madras Artillery and Native Infantry in 1791

Pre independence

- Battle of Sholinghur (1781)
- Siege of Seringapatam (1799)
- Battle of Assaye (1803)
- Anglo-Burmese Wars
- World War I (1914–1918) – The 63rd took part in the East African campaign, while the 75th was stationed in Aden. The 73rd, 79th, 80th, 83rd (WLI) and the 88th took part in the Mesopotamian campaign. The Regiment was awarded the Battle Honours 'Kilimanjaro', 'East Africa 1914-16', 'Kut-al-Amara', 'Baghdad', 'Mesopotamia 1915-18', 'Aden', 'Persia 1918', NW Frontier India 1914-15; 1917' and 'Baluchistan 1918'.
- World War II - 4th Battalion of the regiment fought against Imperial Japan at Imphal in 1943. It was awarded the Battle Honours ‘Tamu Road’, ‘Ukhrul’, ‘Ava’, ‘Kama’ and Theatre Honour ‘Burma 1942-45’. The 1st Battalion took part in the Burma campaign in February 1945. It earned the Battle Honour ‘Mount Popa’ and Theatre Honour 'Burma 1942-45'. The unit then went on to serve in Malaya and Indonesia. The 28th Battalion served in Bahrain and Khorramshahrin the Persian Gulf.

Post independence

- Indo-Pakistani War of 1947–1948– 1, 2 and 4 Madras took part in the operations. 1 Madras fought in the axis Kathua-Jammu and then in Baramulla and Tithwal sectors. 2 Madras joined 77 Parachute Brigade at Srinagar in May 1948 and saw action in Uri in July 1948. 4 Madras (WLI) joined operations in September 1948 and in October took part in the capture of Pir Kalewa and 'Camel's Hump', opening the way to the Mendhar valley. The regiment won a Maha Vir Chakra, seven Vir Chakras and 16 Mentions-in-Despatches and was awarded Battle Honours 'Punch' and 'Tithwal' and the Theatre Honour 'Jammu and Kashmir 1947-48'.
- Hyderabad Police Action (1948) – 8 Madras took part in the rounding up of hostile forces at Tirumalagiri.
- United Nations Operation in the Congo (ONUC) – 4 Madras (WLI) was posted under ONUC in 1962-63. The regiment received one Vir Chakra and four Sena Medals during this tenure.
- Sino-Indian War (1962) – 1, 2, 16 and 17 Madras saw action in the war. All except the 16th saw action in NEFA. The 16th was near Gangtok in Sikkim. 1 Madras bore the brunt of the Chinese attack and many were taken prisoners. It was awarded a Vir Chakra.
- Indo-Pakistani War of 1965
  - 1 Madras was at Rajouri and later at Nowshera. It was then involved in the capture of Malla. It was awarded the theatre honours ‘Punjab 1965’ and ‘Jammu and Kashmir 1965’ and the battle honour ‘Kalidhar’. It was also awarded two Sena Medals and three mentioned in despatches.
  - 2 Madras moved from its location in Ambala to Dera Baba Nanak, where it saw action against the Pakistanis. It then saw action at Khemkaran. The battalion suffered 27 casualties during the war.
  - 3 Madras was given the responsibility to capture Maharajke village, which was part of the larger game plan – Operation Riddle. The village was 2.5 km inside Pakistani territory, the assault began with open fire with artillery, medium machine gun and rifles from the enemy. Despite the effective fire, the Army relentlessly kept up the pace of assault and with remarkable courage captured Maharajke within one day. The battalion suffered 45 casualties during the war and was awarded two Sena Medals.
  - 4 Madras (WLI) also took part in the capture of Maharajke and then in the Sialkot sector as part of 69 Mountain Brigade. It was awarded the battle honour ‘Maharajke’, one Maha Vir Chakra, 3 Vir Chakras and three mentioned in despatches.
  - 6 Madras took part in anti-infiltration role in the Rajouri-Palam Kandi-Budhal axis in September 1965.
  - 7 Madras fought in Mandi area against infiltrators from Pakistani occupied Kashmir.
  - 8 Madras served in Moga and Machhiwara in Punjab and then moved to Rajasthan sector around Jaisalmer.
  - 9 Madras was located at Firozpur under 65 Infantry Brigade. It fought the famous Battle of Burki and played a leading role in the capture of Barka-Kalan and Ichogil Bund. The battalion was honoured with one Vir Chakra, two Sena Medals, twelve mentioned in dispatches and the theatre honour ‘Punjab 1965’.
  - 16 Madras was posted in the eastern border under 32 Mountain Brigade. It was tasked to build a bridgehead across the Ichamati River, which it performed suitably.
  - 17 Madras joined 85 Infantry Brigade at Ahmedabad and was involved in the campaigns at Dali and Jessekapar.
- Indo-Pakistani War of 1971
  - 3 Madras was part of 65 Infantry Brigade and took part in the battle of Kalsian Khurd, which involved the capture of this border village on western front in Punjab. The battalion lost 7 soldiers and 9 wounded and was awarded two Sena Medals.
  - 4 Madras was part of 340 Mountain Brigade Group in the Eastern Sector. It saw action in the Bogra Sector and was awarded a Vir Chakra.
  - 6 Madras was under 54 Infantry Division in the Western Front. It saw action in Punjab and was awarded the theatre honour ‘Punjab 1971’ and the battle honour ‘Basantar’.
  - 8 Madras was under 32 Infantry Brigade in the Eastern front of the war. Assigned to press home an attack on Siramani in East Pakistan, a fortified military base of Pakistan the gallant ‘Thambis’, despite strong enemy resistance succeeded in capturing the post through sheer exhibition of courageousness and professionalism. It won the theatre honour ‘East Pakistan 1971’, the battle honour ‘Siramani and a Vir Chakra.
  - 9 Madras was deployed under the 330 Infantry Brigade at Barmer. It captured Mahendro Ro Par and Fateh Ro Par on Gadra City-Umraokot axis and remained deployed at Naya Chor till the announcement of ceasefire on 17 December 1971. The battalion had ten casualties (2 killed and 8 wounded) and was awarded a Vir Chakra.
  - 16 Madras under 54 Infantry Division played an important part in the Battle of Basantar. The battalion fought valiantly and had 5 officers and 27 JCOs and Other Ranks killed, and 1 officer and 103 JCOs and Other Ranks wounded. It was awarded the battle honour ‘Basantar’, two Maha Vir Chakras, five Vir Chakras, two Sena Medals and six mentioned in despatches.
  - 17 Madras under 116 Infantry Brigade and was deployed in Muktsar area. It successfully captured enemy posts of ‘Kili Sahu’ and ‘Chukra’. During these actions, it was awarded one Vir Chakra, three Sena Medals and one mentioned in despatches.
  - 18 Madras made the Indian Army’s deepest thrust in the western desert, as part of 31 Infantry Brigade of 11 Division. It saw extensive marches through trackless desert, periods without food and water and finally bitter fighting at Hingoro Tar, Sind. The battalion suffered 31 casualties: 1 officer, 1 JCO and 16 Other Ranks killed, and 3 officers, 2 JCOs and 8 Other Ranks wounded. It was awarded one Maha Vir Chakra, two Vir Chakras and four Sena Medals.
  - 19 Madras was under 323 Infantry Brigade in Jammu and Kashmir. It was initially deployed to defend the Ramgarh Ditch, but was inducted into Chamb-Jaurian Sector by 11 December. It was then engaged in aggressive patrolling and was awarded one Sena Medal and one mentioned in despatches.
  - 26 Madras was in the eastern front under 350 Infantry Brigade. It undertook aggressive patrolling towards Chuttipur, capturing it and then opening the main road axis Rangaon-Jessore. It then showed mettle in the Battle of Siramani, one of the fiercest battles of the war fought in the Khulna sector. The battalion lost 2 Officers, 2 JCO and 12 Other Ranks killed, and 4 Officers, 2 JCOs and 56 Other Ranks wounded during the operations. It was awarded the battle honour ‘Siramani’, two Vir Chakras, one Sena Medal and one mentioned in despatches.
  - 27 Madras, the freshly minted battalion saw action initially in Longewala and then in the Kutch sector. During a reconnaissance patrol, the commanding officer and six men were killed during an ambush across the international border.
- Operation Blue Star (1984) – 26 Madras as part of 350 Infantry Brigade took part in the operation. It was tasked to attack from southern (Langar side) entrance to secure the southern and eastern wings. Its casualties included fourteen killed and forty nine wounded.
- Operation Pawan - As many as seven battalions of the Regiment (2, 5, 7, 11, 12, 19, 25) were deployed in Sri Lanka. This was a testimony to the loyalty, dedication and valour of the troops of the Madras Regiment. In addition to its operation role, many of the soldiers were used as interpreters during the conflict.
- Counter insurgency operations in Jammu & Kashmir and Punjab.
- Operation Meghdoot (Siachen glacier)
- United Nations Peacekeeping missions - 2 Madras served in the United Nation mission in Lebanon in 1999-2000 and 26 Madras served as part of the United Nation Forces at Congo in 2007-08.

== Battle Honours ==
The list of battle honours is evidence to the long history and valour of the regiment. Some of these honours have been declared repugnant after the independence of the country.

Pre Independence

- Amboor
- Carnatic
- Sholinghur
- Mysore
- Seringapatam
- Assaye
- Cochin
- Bourbon
- Seetabuldee
- Nagpore
- Maheidpore
- Kemmendine
- Ava
- China
- Pegu
- Lucknow
- Central India
- Afghanistan 1839
- Burma
- Malakand
- Tirah
- Punjab Frontier
- China 1900
- North West Frontier
- East Africa
- Kilimanjaro
- Mesopotamia
- Baghdad
- Kut-Al-Amara
- North West Frontier
- Persia
- Aden
- Baluchistan
- Afghanistan 1878-80
- Mount Popa
- Tamu Road
- Ukhrul
- Ava
- Kama

Post Independence

- Tithwal
- Punch
- Kalidhar
- Maharajke
- Basantar
- Siramani

== Theatre Honours ==
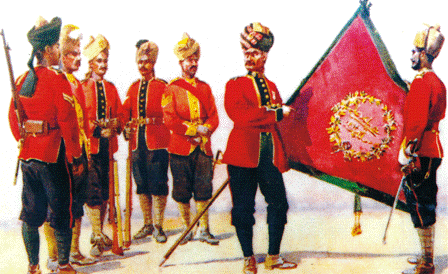
Battle of Sholinghur - Hyder Ali's standard captured by Madras Regiment

The theatre honours earned by the battalions of the regiment are as follows -

Pre Independence

- World War II 1939-45
- Burma 1942-45

Post Independence

- Jammu & Kashmir 1947-48
- Jammu & Kashmir 1965
- Punjab 1965
- Punjab 1971
- Sindh 1971
- East Pakistan 1971

== Gallantry awards ==
Pre independence -

- Victoria Cross (VC) – Lieutenant (later Colonel) Charles James William Grant, 12 Madras Native Infantry, Captain (later Major) Herbert Clogstoun, 19th Madras Native Infantry.
- Officer of the Most Excellent Order of the British Empire (OBE) - Lieutenant Colonel AT Scott, Lieutenant Colonel Pythian Adams, Major James Archibald Gill.
- Member of the Most Excellent Order of the British Empire (MBE) – Major Karunakara Menon, Major EG Sollay, Major CJL Maddan, Major M S Hussain, Major TR Subramanian, Captain N Ananthan Nair.
- Indian Order of Merit (IOM) - Lance Naik Chathu.
- Distinguished Service Order (DSO) – Lieutenant Colonel WR Wenning.
- Military Cross – Lieutenant Colonel CH M Vean, Major RS Norohna (bar to MC), Major CPA Menon, Major Mohinder Singh, Captain PL Achard, Subedar Major CM Thomas, Subedar Rama Rao, Subedar Devarajulu.
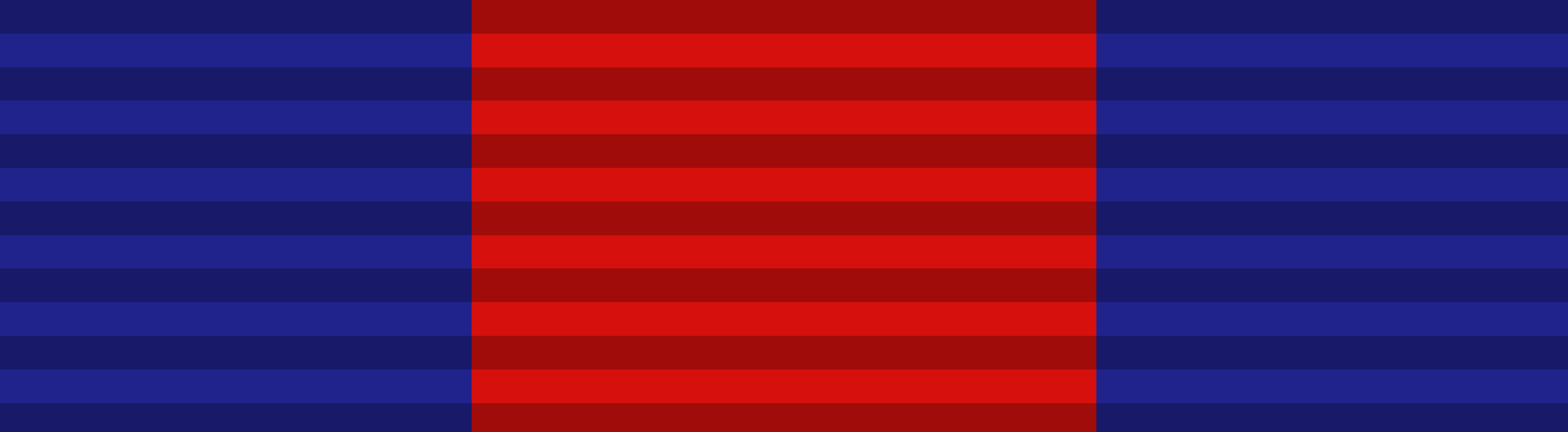
- Indian Distinguished Service Medal (IDSM) – Subedar Major Homilal, Subedar Mohd Ismail, Havildar Shaik Ahmed, Naik Perumal, Naik Thangamuthu, Lance Naik Gurumurthy.
- Order of British India (2nd Class) – Subedar Major John Peter.
- British Empire Medal (BEM) – Havildar Michael, Havildar Devasigamani.
- Military Medal – Subedar Pakianathan, Havildar Kannan Nair, Naik P Madhavan, Naik Subbaiah, Lance Naik Kanniappan, Lance Naik Sengani, Lance Naik Krishna Reddy, Sepoy Pratap Singh, Chedayan.

Post independence

- Ashoka Chakra (AC) - Lieutenant Ram Prakash Roperia, 26 Madras
- Maha Vir Chakra (MVC) – Naik Raju, Lieutenant Colonel Harbans Lal Mehta, Lieutenant Colonel Ved Prakash Ghai, Captain SS Walkar, Havildar Philipose Thomas
- Kirti Chakra (KC) - Major P Bhaskaran, Captain SR Kosuri, Company Havildar Major S Michael, Subedar K Raman Ravi, Naib Subedar K George Koshy, Havildar Varghese Mathew, Naik Kannalan Kennady V, Havildar Dhanaraj Muthappan, Major AS Bhadauria, Lieutenant Vikram Ajit Deshmukh, Naik Radhakrishnan C.
- Vir Chakra (VrC) - Company Havildar Major Pushpanathan, Havildar Gopala Kurup, Naik Abdul Rahiman Kunju, Lance Naik Ayyappan, Jemadar Shaik Khadar, Brigadier K Venugopal, Captain EN Iyengar, Sepoy Sanal Kumaran Pillai, Subedar Major Mohammed Ibrahim, 2nd Lieutenant VN Madan, Subedar CA Madhavan Nambiar, Subedar PM Gregory, Sepoy Kannan, Sepoy Bhaskaran Nair, Captain Gopakumar Raman Pillai, Subedar AP Sreedhara Das, Major PV Sahadevan, Naik Appukuttan Sahadevan, Naik Mani, Naik Jajula Sanyasi, Naib Subedar PO Cheriyan, Naib Subedar PC Varghese, Subedar Krishnan Nair, Sepoy Kolli John Krishthaper, Naik V Bhaskaran, Havildar Kamalasanan PK, Havildar M Anthony Wilson, Captain RS Chopra, Subedar Russel Maria, Havildar A Shanmuga Sundaram, Naik (Lance Havildar) C Subbaiyan, Captain RS Rana, Lieutenant Colonel AS Sekhon.
- Shaurya Chakra (SC) - 2nd Lieutenant Udhe Singh, Jemadar S Raja Manickam, Sepoy Raji, Sepoy M Lakshmanan, Company Quarter Master Havildar Ramakrishna Pillai, Sepoy PO Ommen, Major Mohanan Pappini Veetil, Lance Havildar Kuppuswamy, Naik Madhusoodanan Pillai, Sepoy C Rayappan, Sepoy A Ravi Kumar, Lance Naik Surendran Nair K, Havildar Sarthi Reddy Budupu, Major Kamal Kalia, Subedar Mayan Gopal, Naik Varsi Vasudev Rao, Major John Soundra Pandian, Major SS Gahlawat, Naik Yama Sivasankara Reddy, Sepoy Alphonse S, Sepoy J Veerabhadrudu, Lieutenant Colonel Ajit Bhandarkar, Havildar Radhakrishnan Kunju Panicker, Major Rajeshwar Singh, Major Chatoth Binu Bharathan, Lance Naik Krishna Murthy G, Naik Manesh PV, Havildar Luis Periyera Nayagam, Lieutenant Colonel Sanjay Kaushik, Major NN Venkata Sriram, Naik Baiju B, Captain Ashutosh Kumar, Naib Subedar Sreejith M, Sepoy Maruprolu Jaswanth Kumar Reddy

== Colonels of the Regiment ==
The Colonel of the regiment is a senior officer of the regiment, usually the senior-most, who is a father-figure to the regiment and looks after the interests of the regiment. This is a tradition and position that the Indian Army has inherited from the British Army. The officers who have graced this position are as follows -

Name	Date
Captain Sir Arthur Hope, KCIE, MC, Governor of Madras	25 September 1942 to 9 August 1946
Lieutenant General Archibald Nye, GCIE, KCB, KBE, MC, Governor of Madras	10 August 1946 to 31 March 1949
General SM Shrinagesh	1 April 1949 to 31 March 1961
Lieutenant General RS Noronha, PVSM, MC*	1 April 1961 to 4 September 1973
Major General SP Mahadevan, AVSM	5 September 1973 to 30 June 1982
Lieutenant General Sami Khan, PVSM, SM	1 July 1986 to 31 March 1989
Lieutenant General VK Singh, PVSM, ADC	1 April 1989 to 31 March 1994
Lieutenant General MM Walia, PVSM, AVSM, SM	1 April 1994 to 30 April 1996
Lieutenant General AS Rao, PVSM, AVSM	1 May 1996 to 31 October 2001
Lieutenant General DS Chauhan, PVSM, UYSM, AVSM, VSM	1 November 2001 to 31 December 2003
Lieutenant General AK Chopra, PVSM, AVSM	22 December 2004 to 30 November 2006
Major General VDI Devavaram, SM, VSM	1 January 2004 to 21 December 2004, 1 December 2006 to 31 December 2007
Lieutenant General PG Kamath, PVSM, AVSM, YSM, SM	1 January 2008 to 31 Mar 2013
Lieutenant General Jai Prakash Nehra, AVSM**	1 April 2013 to 23 October 2014
Lieutenant General SL Narasimhan, PVSM, AVSM*, VSM	24 October 2014 to 31 May 2016
Lieutenant General Rajeev Chopra, PVSM, AVSM, ADC	1 June 2016 to
Lieutenant General Manjinder Singh, YSM, VSM	Incumbent

== Commemorative stamps ==
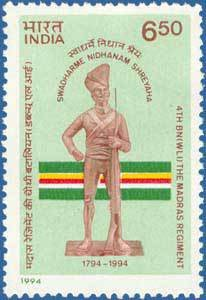
200 years of 4 Madras, 1994

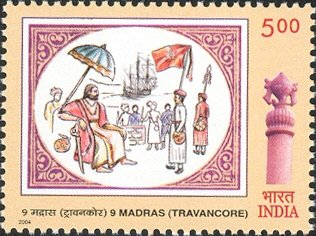
300 years of 9 Madras (Travancore), 2004

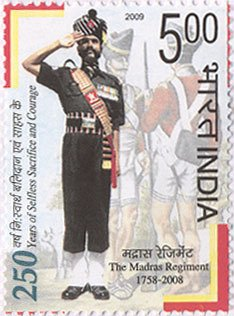
250 years of Madras Regiment, 2009

== See also ==
- 9th Battalion, Madras Regiment
- List of regiments of the Indian Army
