= 80th Carnatic Infantry =

- Active: 1777-1922
- Country: Indian Empire
- Branch: Army
- Type: Infantry
- Part of: Madras Army (to 1895); Madras Command
- Colors: Red; faced deep green, 1882 green, 1898 emerald green
- Engagements: Second Anglo-Mysore War; Third Anglo-Mysore War; Fourth Anglo-Mysore War; World War I

The 80th Carnatic Infantry were an infantry regiment of the British Indian Army. They could trace their origins to 1777, when they were raised as the 21st Carnatic Battalion, by enlisting men from the 2nd, the 6th, the 12th and the 15th Carnatic Battalions.

The regiment's first action was during the Battle of Sholinghur in the Second Anglo-Mysore War. They also took part in the campaigns for the Third Anglo-Mysore War and were present at the Battle of Seringapatam in the Fourth Anglo-Mysore War in 1798. It was over 100 years before they were next called for active service during World War I.

In 1906 the regiment consisted of four companies of Madrassi Musselmans, one of Telegau and one combining Madras Christians and Dadbers. All but two of their officers had been transferred from other Madras units which were in the process of being disbanded. The 80th Carnatic carried four battle honours on its regimental flag and had the unusual distinction of carrying an extra honorary colour to commemorate the capture of an enemy flag during the 18th century.

During World War I they served in the Mesopotamia Campaign and a second battalion the 2/80th was formed in the Southern Brigade of the 9th (Secunderabad) Division in October 1918, and transferred to the Secunderabad Bde in December 1918.

After World War I the Indian government reformed the army moving from single battalion regiments to multi battalion regiments. In 1922, the 80th Carnatic Infantry was disbanded, being one of the remaining nine single battalion regiments.

== Predecessor names ==
- 21st Carnatic Battalion - 1777
- 21st Madras Battalion - 1784
- 2nd Battalion, 2nd Madras Native Infantry - 1796
- 20th Madras Native Infantry - 1824
- 20th Madras Infantry - 1885
- 80th Carnatic Infantry - 1903
