= 14th Madras Native Infantry =

The 14th Madras Native Infantry may refer to:

- 87th Punjabis and the 88th Carnatic Infantry both originated as the 1st Battalion, 14th Madras Native Infantry in 1798
- 74th Punjabis was called the 14th Madras Native Infantry in 1824
