= Bangalore Brigade =

1st Bangalore Brigade Bangalore Brigade 27th (Bangalore) Brigade
- Active: December 1904 – November 1914; January 1917 – 1926
- Country: British India
- Allegiance: British Crown
- Branch: British Indian Army
- Type: Infantry
- Size: Brigade
- Part of: 9th (Secunderabad) Division; Indian Expeditionary Force B
- Garrison/HQ: Bangalore Cantonment
- Engagements: First World War East African Campaign Battle of Tanga

Commanders
- Notable commanders: Maj.-Gen. R.I. Scallon; Maj.-Gen. T.D. Pilcher; Br.-Gen. Lord Ruthven

The Bangalore Brigade was an infantry brigade of the British Indian Army formed in 1904 as a result of the Kitchener Reforms. It was mobilized as 27th (Bangalore) Brigade at the outbreak of the First World War. As part of Indian Expeditionary Force B, it was sent to assault Tanga in German East Africa. With the failure of the Battle of Tanga, its units joined the defences of British East Africa and it was broken up.

The brigade was reformed in India in 1917 for internal security duties and to aid the expansion of the Indian Army in the last year of the war. It, too, was disbanded in 1926.

A 2nd Bangalore Brigade also existed from 1904 to 1911.

== 1st Bangalore Brigade ==
The Kitchener Reforms, carried out during Lord Kitchener's tenure as Commander-in-Chief, India (1902–09), completed the unification of the three former Presidency armies, the Punjab Frontier Force, the Hyderabad Contingent and other local forces into one Indian Army. Kitchener identified the Indian Army's main task as the defence of the North-West Frontier against foreign aggression (particularly Russian expansion into Afghanistan) with internal security relegated to a secondary role. The Army was organized into divisions and brigades that would act as field formations but also included internal security troops.

The 1st Bangalore Brigade was formed in December 1904 (Note: December 1904 was the appointment date of the first commanding officer of the 1st Bangalore Brigade.) as a result of the Kitchener Reforms. The brigade formed part of the 9th (Secunderabad) Division. In 1906, the 2nd Bangalore Brigade was renamed as the Bangalore Cavalry Brigade, and the 1st Brigade became simply the Bangalore Brigade.

27th (Bangalore) Brigade

In August 1914, Indian Expeditionary Force B was intended to assault Dar es Salaam in German East Africa with 16th (Poona) Brigade as its nucleus. In the event, 16th (Poona) Brigade was mobilized with 6th (Poona) Division and sent to Mesopotamia. Instead, Bangalore Brigade was mobilized on 10 September 1914 as the 27th (Bangalore) Brigade along with the Imperial Service Infantry Brigade.

The Force sailed from Bombay on 16 October with Tanga as the target for an attack. After the failure of the Battle of Tanga (2–5 November), the Force disembarked at Mombassa and joined the defences of British East Africa. The brigade was broken up at this point.

Reformed brigade

The Bangalore Brigade was reformed in 9th (Secunderabad) Division in January 1917. It remained with the division for the rest of the war, carrying out internal security duties. In the final year of the war, the division (and brigade) took part in the general expansion of the Indian Army as new units were formed. It was disbanded in 1926.

=== Orders of battle ===
In India in August 1914
At the outbreak of the First World War, the brigade had the following composition:
- 2nd Battalion, Loyal North Lancashire Regiment
- 61st King George's Own Pioneers (joined Indian Expeditionary Force B as Force Troops)
- 101st Grenadiers
- 108th Infantry (transferred to Bombay in October 1914)
- IV Brigade, RFA – 7th, 14th and 66th Batteries (joined 3rd (Lahore) Division in August 1914 and departed for the Western Front)

East African Campaign
The brigade's composition for its involvement in the East African Campaign was:
- 2nd Battalion, Loyal North Lancashire Regiment (Note: 2nd Battalion, Loyal North Lancashire Regiment remained in East Africa until December 1916 (though it was in South Africa from 10 May to 20 August 1916 to recover from ill health). It was posted to Egypt where it joined the British 75th Division on 14 April 1917.)
- 63rd Palamcottah Light Infantry (joined in September 1914 from Jubbulpore Brigade, 5th (Mhow) Division) (Note: 63rd Palamcottah Light Infantry remained in East Africa until January 1917. It returned to India and joined the Secunderabad Brigade, 9th (Secunderabad) Division.)
- 98th Infantry (joined in September 1914 from Jubbulpore Brigade, 5th (Mhow) Division) (Note: 98th Infantry remained in East Africa until January 1917. It returned to India and joined the 44th (Ferozepore) Brigade, 16th Indian Division.)
- 101st Grenadiers (Note: 101st Grenadiers remained in East Africa until August 1916. It joined the 29th Indian Brigade in Egypt on 4 September 1916.)

Reformed brigade
The reformed brigade commanded the following units:
- 74th Punjabis (arrived from Hong Kong in May 1915; transferred in June to Jubbulpore Brigade, 5th (Mhow) Division)
- 2nd Battalion, 88th Carnatic Infantry (formed in July 1918)
- 2nd Battalion, 75th Carnatic Infantry (formed in October 1918)
- 2nd Battalion, 73rd Carnatic Infantry formed in Southern Brigade in June 1918 and the brigade in December 1918)

=== 1st / 27th Brigade commanders ===
The 1st Bangalore Brigade / Bangalore Brigade / 27th (Bangalore) Brigade / Bangalore Brigade had the following commanders:

From	Rank	Name	Notes
December 1904	Major-General	R.I. Scallon	
June 1908	Major-General	T.D. Pilcher	
June 1909	Major-General	J.G. Ramsay	
May 1911	Major-General	E.C.W. Mackenzie-Kennedy	
January 1913	Brigadier-General	R. Wapshare	Brigade broken up in November 1914
January 1917	Brigadier-General	H.A. Iggulden	Brigade reformed
January 1919	Brigadier-General	O.C. Wolley-Dod	
December 1919	Major-General	T.E. Scott	
May 1920	Brigadier-General	Lord Ruthven	
May 1923	Brigadier-General	H.W. Jackson	Brigade broken up in 1926

== 2nd Bangalore Brigade ==
2nd Bangalore Brigade Bangalore Cavalry Brigade
- Active: December 1904 – October 1911
- Country: British India
- Allegiance: British Crown
- Branch: British Indian Army
- Type: Infantry then Cavalry
- Size: Brigade
- Part of: 9th (Secunderabad) Division
- Garrison/HQ: Bangalore Cantonment

Commanders
- Notable commanders: Maj.-Gen. J.E. Nixon

As a result of the Kitchener Reforms of the British Indian Army, the 2nd Bangalore Brigade was formed in December 1904 from the former Bangalore Second Class District. Major-General John Nixon, commander of the Bangalore District, took command. The brigade formed part of the 9th (Secunderabad) Division.

In 1906, the brigade was renamed as the Bangalore Cavalry Brigade (and the 1st Bangalore Brigade became simply the Bangalore Brigade). It was broken up in 1911.

=== 2nd Brigade commanders ===
The 2nd Bangalore Brigade / Bangalore Cavalry Brigade had the following commanders:

From	Rank	Name	Notes
May 1903	Major-General	J.E. Nixon	GOC of Bangalore Second Class District
August 1906	Brigadier-General	F.G. Atkinson	
August 1909	Brigadier-General	G.A. Cookson	Brigade broken up in October 1911

== Bibliography ==
- Haythornthwaite, Philip J. (1996). The World War One Source Book. London: Arms and Armour Press. ISBN 1-85409-351-7.
- James, Brigadier E.A. (1978). British Regiments 1914–18. London: Samson Books Limited. ISBN 0-906304-03-2.
- Mackie, Colin (June 2015). "Army Commands 1900-2011" (PDF). www.gulabin.com. Archived from the original (PDF) on 5 July 2015.
- Perry, F.W. (1993). Order of Battle of Divisions Part 5B. Indian Army Divisions. Newport: Ray Westlake Military Books. ISBN 1-871167-23-X.
