= 6th Madras Native Infantry =

The 6th Madras Native Infantry could refer to the:

- 1st Battalion which became the 66th Punjabis
- 2nd Battalion which became the 74th Punjabis
