= Operation Sahyog =

Indian army operation

Operation Sahyog was a rescue mission initiated by the Indian army after several northern districts of Kerala were hit by extreme amounts of rain and landslides. The Indian army deployed its manpower and machinery for rescue operations in regions which were hit severely, mainly at Idukki, Wayanad, Kannur, and Kozhikode. The National Disaster Response Force (NDRF) along with the Army, Naval forces and Air forces carried out the rescue operation.

During the operation, for the evacuation of the abandoned people, numerous temporary bridges were made. Two columns of army personnel were stationed at Idukki, as it was affected badly, and in total eight army columns were distributed in other affected regions. In the relief and rescue operation of tourists in Idukki, 80 army personnel from the Madras Regiment were also deployed. An Army soldier also stated that the quick action saved the lives and property of many individuals in the flood-hit areas.
