= 13th Madras Native Infantry =

The 13th Madras Native Infantry may refer to:

- 73rd Carnatic Infantry which was called the 13th Madras Native Infantry in 1824
- 86th Carnatic Infantry which was the 2nd Battalion, 13th Madras Native Infantry in 1798
