= 79th Carnatic Infantry =

- Active: 1777-1922
- Country: Indian Empire
- Branch: Army
- Type: Infantry
- Part of: Madras Army (to 1895); Madras Command
- Uniform: Red; faced sky-blue, 1882 yellow
- Engagements: Carnatic Wars; Second Anglo-Mysore War; Third Anglo-Mysore War; Pegu; Central India; Kurdistan

The 79th Carnatic Infantry was an infantry regiment of the British Indian Army. They could trace their origins to 1777, when the 20th Carnatic Battalion was raised from sub-units of the 1st, 3rd, 8th and 16th Carnatic Battalions.

== History ==
As part of the Madras Army, the regiment took part in the Battle of Carnatic, the Battle of Sholinghur, the Battle of Seringapatam during the Second Anglo-Mysore War and the Indian Mutiny.

In 1903, under a general policy to move the focus for recruitment from Madras to the "martial races" of North-West India, the establishment of the 79th Carnatic Infantry was reduced to 600 officers and men. The intention was to convert this and other Carnatic units which still retained their traditional recruiting basis, to garrison troops. However the influx of recruits from southern India on the outbreak of World War I enabled the 79th Carnatic Infantry not only to be brought up to full strength, but to provide a complete company for the newly raised 1/156th Infantry. By 1914 the regiment was linked ("grouped") with the 75th Carnatic Infantry and the 86th Carnatic Infantry, with a shared recruitment and training centre at Secunderabad.

During World War I the 79th Carnatic Infantry was assigned to Mesopotamia for service against the Ottoman Turks. Initially the regiment performed lines of communication and garrison functions but it saw active service in Kurdistan after November 1918.

After World War I the Indian government restructured the army, moving from single battalion infantry regiments to multi-battalion regiments. The 79th Carnatic Infantry now became the 3rd Battalion, 3rd Madras Regiment. At Independence this regiment became part of the new Indian Army. In May 1950 the 3rd Battalion was disbanded but in March 1962 it was re-raised, still with its old connection to the 79th Carnatic Infantry.

== Victoria Cross ==
Captain Herbert Mackworth Clogstoun 19th Madras Native Infantry, Madras Army was awarded the Victoria Cross during the Indian Mutiny when the following deed took place on 15 January 1859:

For conspicuous bravery in charging the, Rebels into Chichumbah with only eight men of his Regiment (the 2nd Cavalry Hyderabad Contingent), compelling them to re-enter the Town, and finally to abandon their plunder. He was severely wounded himself, and lost seven out of the eight men who accompanied him.

== Previous names ==
- 20th Carnatic Battalion - 1777
- 20th Madras Battalion - 1784
- 2nd Battalion, 7th Madras Native Infantry - 1796
- 19th Madras Native Infantry - 1824
- 19th Madras Infantry - 1885
- 79th Carnatic Infantry - 1903

== Uniform and insignia ==
As the 19th Madras Native Infantry under the East India Company, the regiment wore red coats with French grey facings. Similar sky blue facings were replaced by yellow in 1882. Prior to 1914 the full dress of the 73rd Carnatic Infantry included a khaki turban and the scarlet "zouave" jacket peculiar to Madras infantry regiments, with white facings. No regimental badge is recorded as being worn by the regiment before World War I but as part of the 3rd Madras Regiment it wore a star surmounted by a crown. This was replaced by a shield with crossed swords and scroll in 1946.

== Sources ==
- Barthorp, Michael; Burn, Jeffrey (1979). Indian infantry regiments 1860-1914. Osprey Publishing. ISBN 0-85045-307-0.
- Sumner, Ian (2001). The Indian Army 1914-1947. Osprey Publishing. ISBN 1-84176-196-6.
