= 2nd Madras Native Infantry =

2nd Madras Native Infantry may refer to:

- 1st Battalion which became the 62nd Punjabis
- 2nd Battalion which became the 80th Carnatic Infantry
