= 4th Madras Native Infantry =

The 4th Madras Native Infantry could refer to the:

- 1st Battalion which became the 64th Pioneers
- 2nd Battalion which became the 75th Carnatic Infantry
