= 28th Native Infantry =

28th Native Infantry may refer to several regiments in the British Indian Army:

- the 28th Bengal Native Infantry (later the 28th Punjabis)
- the 28th Bombay Native Infantry (later the 128th Pioneers)
- the 28th Madras Native Infantry (later the 88th Carnatic Infantry)
