= Sir John Braithwaite, 1st Baronet =

- Born: 3 February 1739
- Died: 16 August 1803 (aged 64)
- Military career
- Allegiance: United Kingdom
- Branch: British Army
- Service years: 1765–1801
- Rank: Major General
- Commands: Madras Army
- Conflicts: Second Anglo-Mysore War; Fourth Anglo-Mysore War

Major-General Sir John Braithwaite, 1st Baronet (3 February 1739 – 16 August 1803) was Commander-in-Chief of the Madras Army.

== Background ==
He was born in South Carolina, the only son of Colonel John Braithwaite (1696–1740), author, soldier and diplomat, and his wife Silvia Cole (1714–1799), daughter of William Cole of Amsterdam. He was only a year old when his father, returning home, was killed when the ship he was travelling on was attacked by a Spanish privateer, "the Biscaya", off the Scilly Isles: he was reported to have been murdered in cold blood after the ship surrendered. His mother remarried Reverend Thomas Winstanley.

== Military career ==
Educated at Westminster School, Braithwaite was commissioned as an ensign in the 53rd Regiment of Foot on 6 November 1765. Promoted to lieutenant-colonel on 22 October 1772, he seized the Maharaja of Vizianagram's fort during a local dispute on 28 August 1777. He was then given command of a brigade which included one battalion of Europeans, the 3rd Carnatic Battalion, the 4th Carnatic Battalion and the 20th Carnatic Battalion: with this army he defeated a French force at Mahé in March 1779.

In the summer of 1780 Hyder Ali invaded the Carnatic with over 60,000 men precipitating the Second Anglo-Mysore War: he took Braithwaite prisoner at Seringapatam in February 1782 and held him captive for two years. Braithwaite became acting Commander-in-Chief of the Madras Army in August 1792, conducting the successful Siege of Pondicherry in 1793 and remained in that role until 1796.

Braithwaite was adjutant-general of the force that defeated Tipu Sultan at the Siege of Seringapatam in April 1799 so concluding the Fourth Anglo-Mysore War. He became Commander-in-Chief of the Madras Army in January 1800 and, after retiring in 1801, he was created a Baronet on 18 December 1802 and died at his home in London on 16 August 1803.

== Family ==
He married Elizabeth Brown, daughter of John Brown and Elizabeth Colleton, daughter of Sir John Colleton, 3rd Baronet, and had one surviving son George-Charles, second and last Baronet, and a daughter Sylvia, who married Charles Parkhurst.

Military offices
Preceded by William Medows	C-in-C, Madras Army; 1792–1796	Succeeded by Alured Clarke
Preceded by George Harris	C-in-C, Madras Army; 1800–1801	Succeeded by James Stuart
Baronetage of the United Kingdom
New creation	Baronet (of Poston); 1802–1803	Succeeded by George Charles Braithwaite
