= 9th (Secunderabad) Division =

Infantry division of the British Indian Army

- Active: 1904 - 1922
- Country: British India
- Allegiance: British Crown
- Branch: British Indian Army
- Type: Infantry
- Role: Internal Security
- Size: Division
- Part of: Southern Army

The 9th (Secunderabad) Division was an infantry division formation of the British Indian Army. It was part of the Southern Army and was formed in 1904 after Lord Kitchener was appointed Commander-in-Chief, India between 1902 and 1909. He instituted large-scale reforms, including merging the three armies of the Presidencies into a unified force and forming higher level formations, eight army divisions, and brigading Indian and British units. Following Kitchener's reforms, the British Indian Army became "the force recruited locally and permanently based in India, together with its expatriate British officers."

The Division remained in India on internal security duties during World War I, but some of its brigades were transferred to serve with other units. The 9th (Secunderabad) Cavalry Brigade traveled to France and served on the Western Front as part of the 2nd Indian Cavalry Division. The 27th (Bangalore) Brigade served in East Africa as part of the Indian Expeditionary Force B. Force B was broken up in December 1914 and its units used for the defence of East Africa.

== Composition in 1914 ==
At the outbreak of the First World War in August 1914, the division was commanded by Major-General A. Phayre and had the following composition:

=== Secunderabad Cavalry Brigade ===
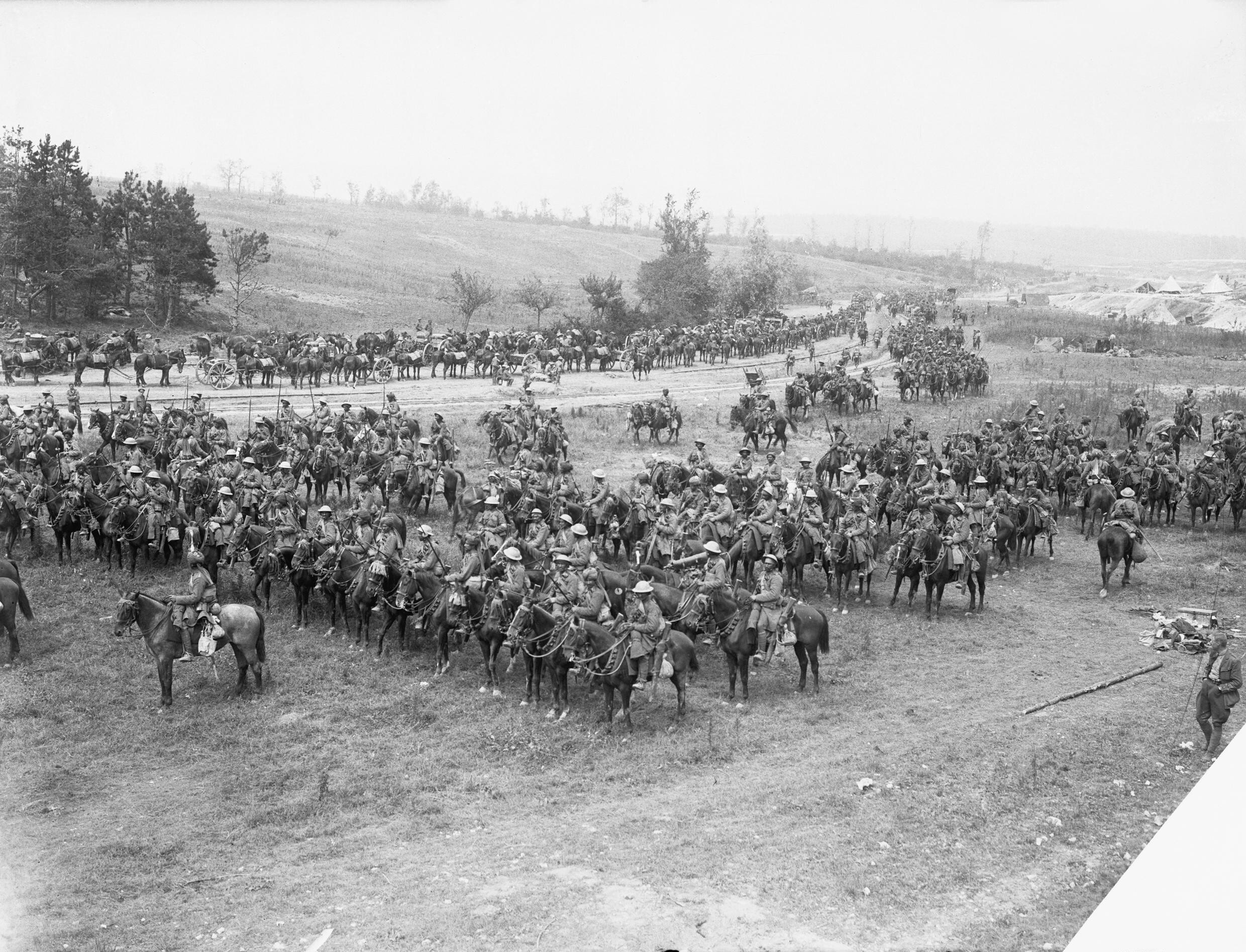
Deccan Horse at Bazentin Ridge, France, 1916

Commander: Brigadier-General F.W.G. Wadeson

- 7th (Princess Royal's) Dragoon Guards
- 7th (Queen's Own) Hussars remained in Secunderabad
- 20th Deccan Horse
- 26th King George’s Own Light Cavalry remained in Secunderabad
- 34th Prince Albert Victor's Own Poona Horse
- Signal Troop

=== 1st Secunderabad Infantry Brigade ===
Commander: Major-General P.S. Wilkinson

- 2nd Battalion, King's (Shropshire Light Infantry)
- 1st Brahmans
- 88th Carnatic Infantry
- 94th Russell's Infantry
- XIX Brigade, Royal Field Artillery

=== 2nd Secunderabad Infantry Brigade ===
Commander: Brigadier-General E.H. Rodwell

- 1st Battalion, Royal Inniskilling Fusiliers
- 6th Jat Light Infantry
- 83rd Wallajahbad Light Infantry
- XIII Brigade, Royal Field Artillery

=== Bangalore Brigade ===
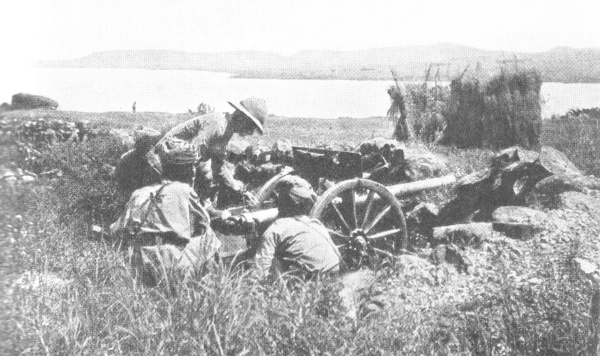
Indian Army Gun crew East Africa

Commander: Brigadier-General Richard Wapshare

- 2nd Battalion, Loyal North Lancashire Regiment
- 61st Pioneers
- 101st Grenadiers
- 108th Infantry
- IV Brigade, Royal Field Artillery

The brigade was reformed as 27th (Bangalore) Brigade and joined Indian Expeditionary Force B for service in British East Africa. The formation was:

- 2nd Battalion, Loyal North Lancashire Regiment
- 63rd Palamcottah Light Infantry
- 98th Infantry
- 101st Grenadiers

=== Southern Brigade ===
Commander: Brigadier-General W.G. Hamilton

- 2nd Battalion, Buffs (East Kent Regiment)
- 1st Battalion, Royal Dublin Fusiliers
- 73rd Carnatic Infantry
- 75th Carnatic Infantry
- 86th Carnatic Infantry
- IX Brigade, Royal Horse Artillery

=== Engineers ===
- 9th Field Company, 2nd Queen Victoria's Own Madras Miners and Sappers
- 10th Field Company, 2nd Queen Victoria's Own Madras Miners and Sappers
- 11th Field Company, 2nd Queen Victoria's Own Madras Miners and Sappers
- 12th Field Company, 2nd Queen Victoria's Own Madras Miners and Sappers

== See also ==
- List of Indian divisions in World War I

== Bibliography ==
- Haythornthwaite, Philip J. (1996). The World War One Source Book. London: Arms and Armour Press. ISBN 1-85409-351-7.
- Moberly, Frederick James (1927) [1923]. The Campaign in Mesopotamia 1914–1918. History of the Great War Based on Official Documents. Vol. I. London: HMSO. OCLC 772784341.
- Perry, F.W. (1993). Order of Battle of Divisions Part 5B. Indian Army Divisions. Newport: Ray Westlake Military Books. ISBN 1-871167-23-X.
- Rinaldi, Richard A (2008). Order of Battle of the British Army 1914. Ravi Rikhye. ISBN 978-0-97760728-0.
- Sumner, Ian (2001). The Indian Army 1914-1947. Oxford: Osprey Publishing. ISBN 1-84176-196-6.
