= Herbert Clogstoun =

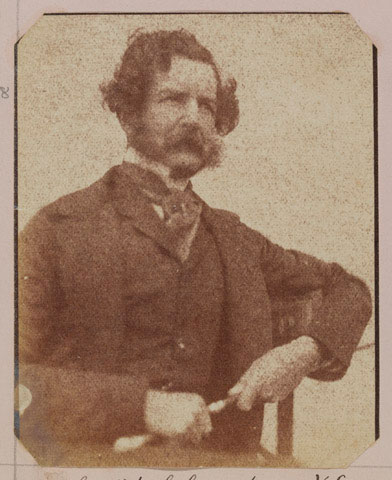
- Born: 13 June 1820; Port-of-Spain, Trinidad
- Died: 6 May 1862 (aged 41); Hingoli, India
- Burial place: Christian Graveyard, Hingoli
- Military career
- Allegiance: United Kingdom
- Branch: Madras Army; British Indian Army
- Rank: Major
- Conflicts: Second Anglo-Burmese War; Indian Mutiny
- Awards: Victoria Cross

Major Herbert Mackworth Clogstoun VC (13 June 1820 – 6 May 1862) was a recipient of the Victoria Cross, the highest and most prestigious award for gallantry in the face of the enemy that can be awarded to British and Commonwealth forces.

== Details ==
Clogstoun was born 13 June 1820 at Port of Spain, Trinidad, West Indies. The son of Samuel Matthew Clogstoun, Collector of Customs, Tobago, and Caroline Jane (née Walcott).

0n 8 Jan 1856 He married Mary Julia MacKenzie, the daughter of Lt Gen Colin MacKenzie and Adeline (née Pattle), at the Church Mission Chapel, Black Town, Madras, now Chennai, India. They had two sons and four daughters.

He was a 38 year-old captain in the 19th Madras Native Infantry, Madras Army during the Indian Mutiny when the following deed took place on 15 January 1859, for which he was awarded the VC:

For conspicuous bravery in charging the, Rebels into Chichumbah with only eight men of his Regiment (the 2nd Cavalry Hyderabad Contingent), compelling them to re-enter the Town, and finally to abandon their plunder. He was severely wounded himself, and lost seven out of the eight men who accompanied him.

— London Gazette

Clogstoun later achieved the rank of major and was killed in action at Hingoli, India, on 6 May 1862.

== Further information ==
His Victoria Cross is displayed at the National Army Museum in Chelsea, England.
