= Ross Lang =

- Military career
- Allegiance: Great Britain
- Branch: East India Company
- Rank: Lieutenant General
- Commands: Madras Army
- Conflicts: First Anglo-Mysore War

Lieutenant General Ross Lang was Commander-in-Chief of the Madras Army.

== Military career ==
Lang was commissioned into the Madras European Regiment. He commanded a battalion at the Siege of Madura in 1763 and then, having been promoted to lieutenant-colonel, he served in the First Anglo-Mysore War. He was appointed Commander-in-Chief of the Madras Army in 1777, following the suspension of James Stuart, and commanded the Army at Vellore. With the rank of lieutenant general he commanded the Madras Army again between 1783 and 1785.

== Family ==
In 1773 he married Anne Oats; their son, also called Ross Lang, became a major-general and died in 1822.
