= 2nd Punjab Regiment =

- Active: 1922 – 1947
- Country: British India
- Branch: British Indian Army
- Type: Infantry
- Regimental Centre: Multan (1923–1946)
- Mottos: Sthal Wa Jal (By land and sea)
- Colors: Green and gold

Insignia
- Regimental insignia: A galley with a bank of oars and sail

The 2nd Punjab Regiment was a British Indian Army infantry regiment from 1922 until the partition of India in 1947.

The regiment was formed by the amalgamation of other regiments:

- 1st Battalion, from the 67th Punjabis, formerly the 7th Regiment of Madras Native Infantry
- 2nd Battalion, from the 69th Punjabis
- 3rd Battalion, from the 72nd Punjabis
- 4th Battalion, from the 74th Punjabis
- 5th Battalion, from the 87th Punjabis
- 10th (Training) Battalion, formed by redesignation of 2nd Bn, 67th Punjabis

== History ==
The first battalion was raised at Trichinopoly in 1761 as the 1st Battalion of Coast Sepoys. The first four battalions were raised during the hostilities in the Carnatic in south India between 1761 and 1776. The numbers and titles of the battalions changed during the successive reorganisations of the Madras Presidency Army and later of the Indian Army.

The regiment insignia is of a naval vessel, a galley. It was awarded to the 9th Madras Native Infantry in recognition of the readiness to serve overseas, after the battalion had fought in eight overseas campaigns by 1824.

== Battle honours ==
- The Great War: Loos, France and Flanders 1915, Helles, Krithia, Gallipoli 1915, Suez Canal, Egypt 1915–17, Gaza, Megiddo, Sharon, Nablus, Palestine 1917–18, Defence of Kut al Amara, Kut al Amara 1917, Baghdad, Mesopotamia 1915–18, Aden, E Africa 1914–17, NW Frontier India 1915 '16–17
- Afghanistan 1919
- Second World War: Keren, Ad Teclesan, Amba Alagi, Abyssinia 1940–41, Central Malaya, Ipoh, Singapore Island, Malaya 1941–42, North Africa 1940–43, Casa Bettini, Italy 1943–45, Buthidaung, Ngakedaung Pass, North Arakan, Imphal, Litan, Kanglatongbi, Tengnoupal, Tonzang, Kennedy Peak, Defence of Meiktila, Pyinmana, Burma 1942–45.
