= 72nd Punjabis =

- Active: 1759–1922
- Country: Indian Empire
- Branch: Army
- Type: Infantry
- Part of: Madras Army (to 1895); Madras Command
- Colors: Red; faced pale buff, 1882 white 1892 Drab; faced white
- Engagements: Second Anglo-Mysore War; First Burmese War; Third Burmese War; World War I

The 72nd Punjabis were an infantry regiment of the British Indian Army. They could trace their origins to 1759, when they were raised as the 16th Battalion Coast Sepoys.

== History ==
The regiment's first battle was the Battle of Sholinghur in 1781, during the Second Anglo-Mysore War. They were next involved in the Battle of Ava during the First Burmese War. During the Indian Mutiny of 1857, they were stationed in Hong Kong and Singapore. Their next action was during the Third Burmese War. With the defeat of King Thibaw Min, the regiment remained in Burma, being renamed the 2nd Burma Battalion in 1891. This transferral of six regiments of the Madras line to Burma Battalions was intended to provide permanent garrisons for the newly acquired territory. It was also part of a deliberate policy by General Sir Frederick Roberts to reduce the Madrasi element in the Indian Army and replace them with northern recruits from the Punjab. The title of the regiment subsequently underwent a number of changes but, as late as 1914, its regimental centre remained Mandalay.

During World War I, they were deployed along the North West Frontier with the 1st (Peshawar) Division to prevent incursions by the Afghan tribes, but they were later sent to Egypt and Palestine and took part in the Sinai and Palestine Campaign attached to the 75th Division.

After World War I, the Indian government reformed the army, moving from single battalion regiments to multi battalion regiments. In 1922, the 72nd Punjabis became the 3rd Battalion, 2nd Punjab Regiment. After independence, they were one of the regiments allocated to the Indian Army.

== Predecessor names ==
- 16th Battalion Coast Sepoys - 1759
- 13th Carnatic Battalion - 1769
- 12th Carnatic Battalion - 1770
- 12th Madras Battalion - 1784
- 2nd Battalion, 8th Madras Native Infantry - 1796
- 12th Madras Native Infantry - 1824
- 2nd Burma Infantry - 1890
- 12th Regiment (2nd Burma Battalion) Madras Infantry - 1891
- 12th Burma Infantry - 1901
- 72nd Punjabis - 1903

== Composition ==
Recruited from Madrasis during its history prior to 1890, the regiment underwent substantial changes after that year. The senior Indian position of subadar-major was filled by a Sikh and the Madrasi rank and file were replaced by Pathans, Punjabis, Mussalmans and Sikhs. In 1903 the 12th lost its status as a Madras/Burma Infantry unit and was formally designated as a Punjabi regiment (see above).

== Sources ==
- Barthorp, Michael; Burn, Jeffrey (1979). Indian infantry regiments 1860-1914. Osprey Publishing. ISBN 0-85045-307-0.
- Rinaldi, Richard A (2008). Order of Battle British Army 1914. Ravi Rikhye. ISBN 978-0-9776072-8-0.
- Sharma, Gautam (1990). Valour and sacrifice: famous regiments of the Indian Army. Allied Publishers. ISBN 81-7023-140-X.
- Sumner, Ian (2001). The Indian Army 1914-1947. Osprey Publishing. ISBN 1-84176-196-6.
- Moberly, Frederick James (1927) [1923]. The Campaign in Mesopotamia 1914–1918. History of the Great War Based on Official Documents. Vol. I. London: HMSO. OCLC 772784341.
