= Madras Army =

- Active: 1757–1895 (as the Madras Army); 1895–1908 (as the Madras Command of the Indian Army)
- Type: Command
- Size: 47,000 (1876)
- Part of: Presidency armies
- Garrison/HQ: Ootacamund, Nilgiris district

The Madras Army was the army of the Presidency of Madras, one of the three presidencies of British India within the British Empire. The Madras Army was originally intended to be composed only of Rajputs, Mussalmans, and the Four Telugu castes the Telaga or Balija, Kammas, the Razus and the Velamas.

The presidency armies, like the presidencies themselves, belonged to the East India Company until the Government of India Act 1858 (passed in the aftermath of the Indian Rebellion of 1857) transferred all three presidencies to the direct authority of the British Crown.

In 1895 all three presidency armies were merged into the British Indian Army.

== Establishment and early history ==
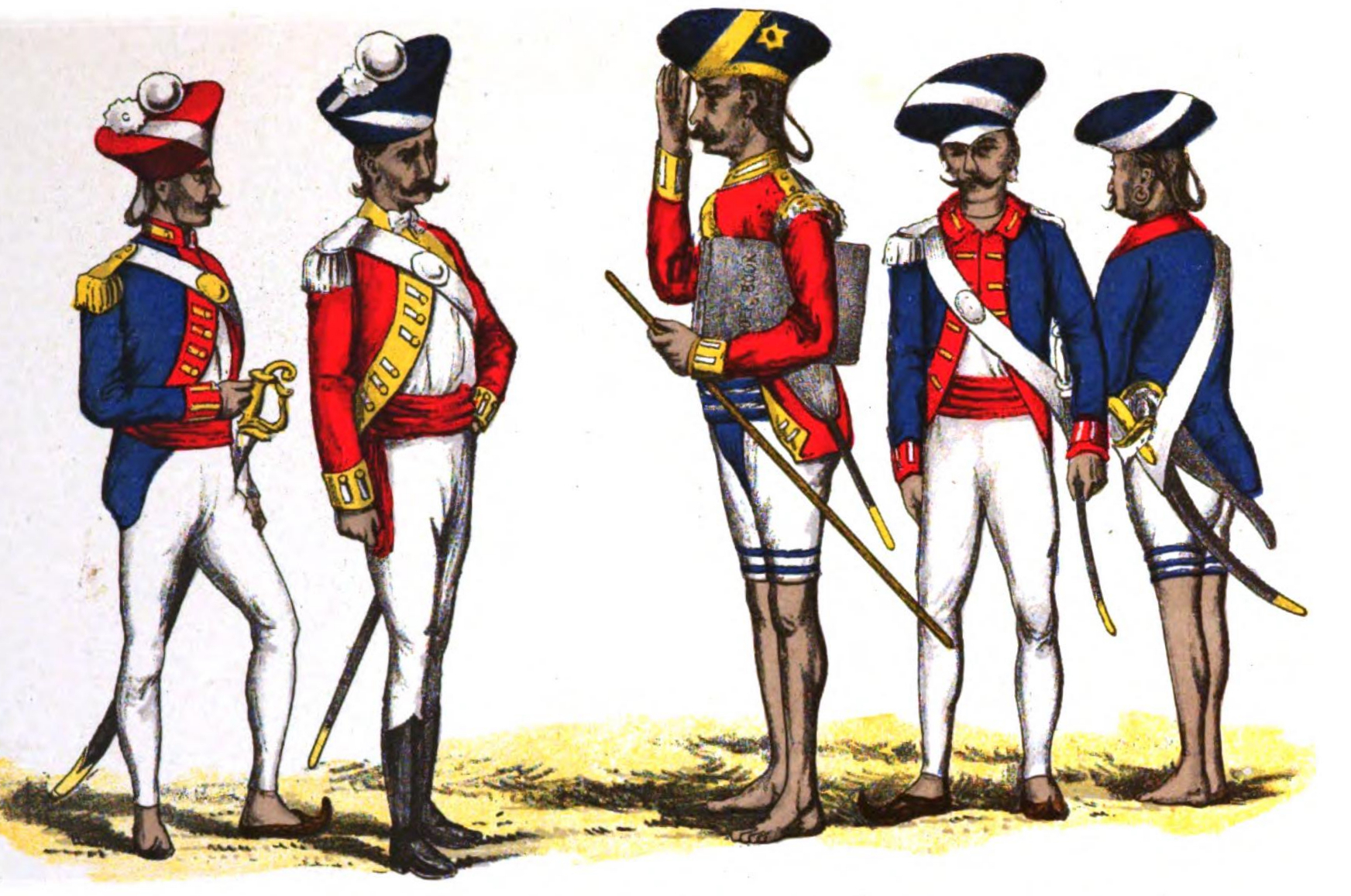
Native officers, NCOs and sepoys of Madras Artillery and Native Infantry in 1791

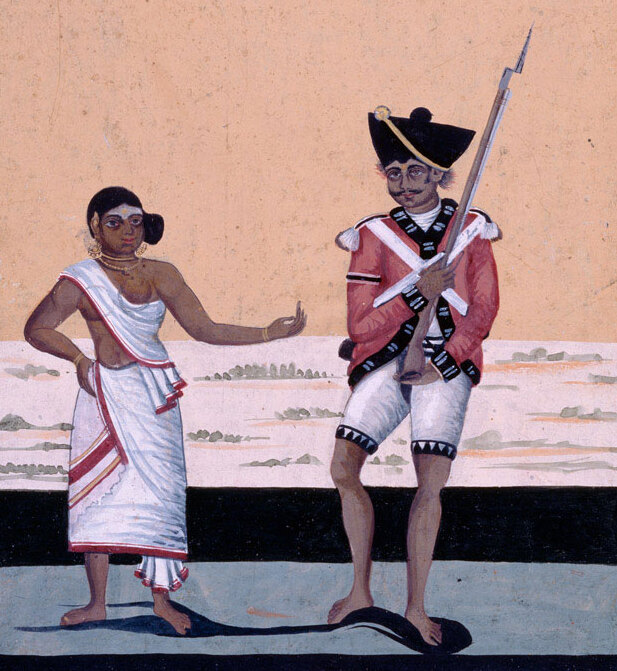
c. 1810 illustration of a Madras Army sepoy and his wife

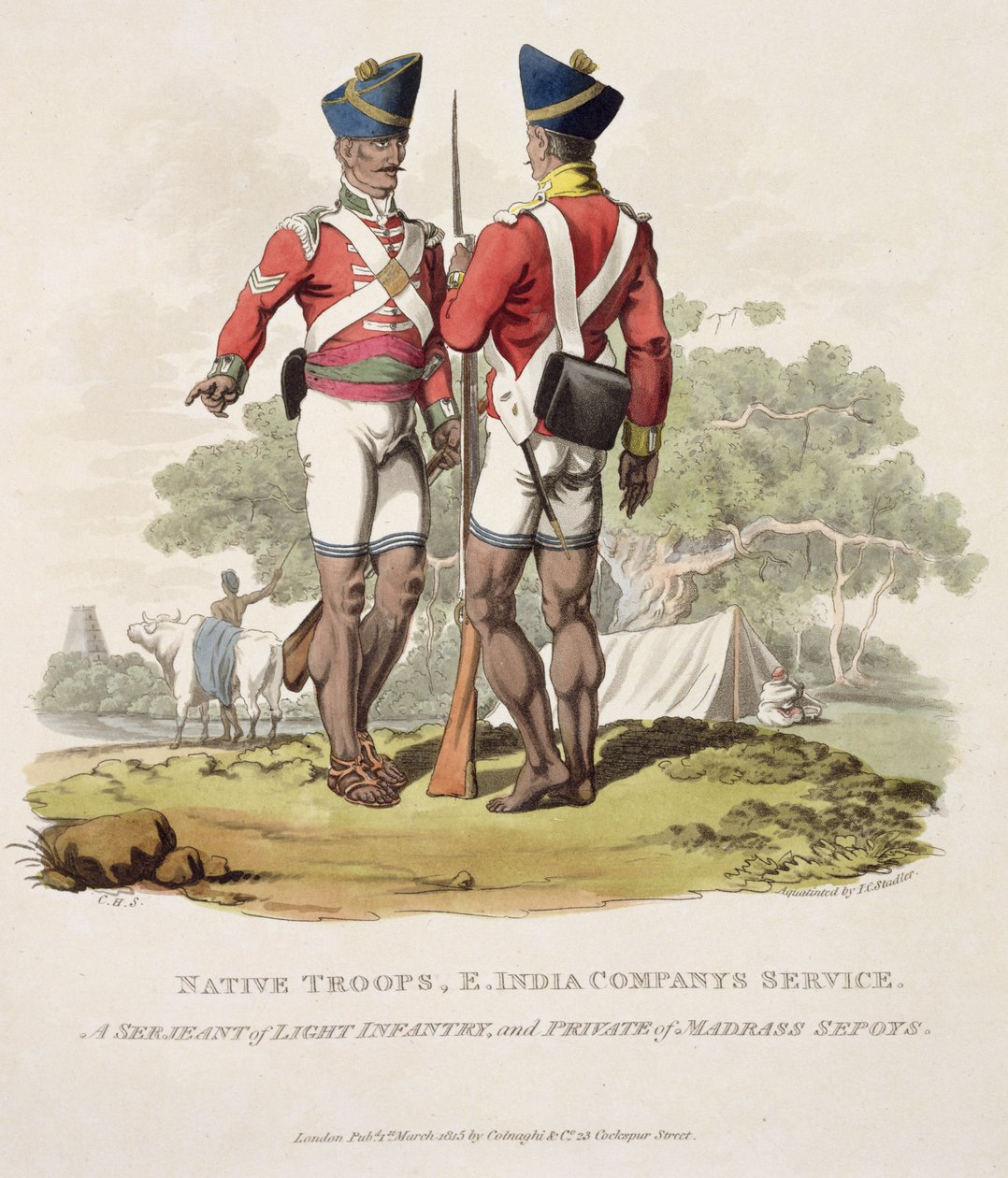
1812 engraving of a Madras Army havildar and sepoy

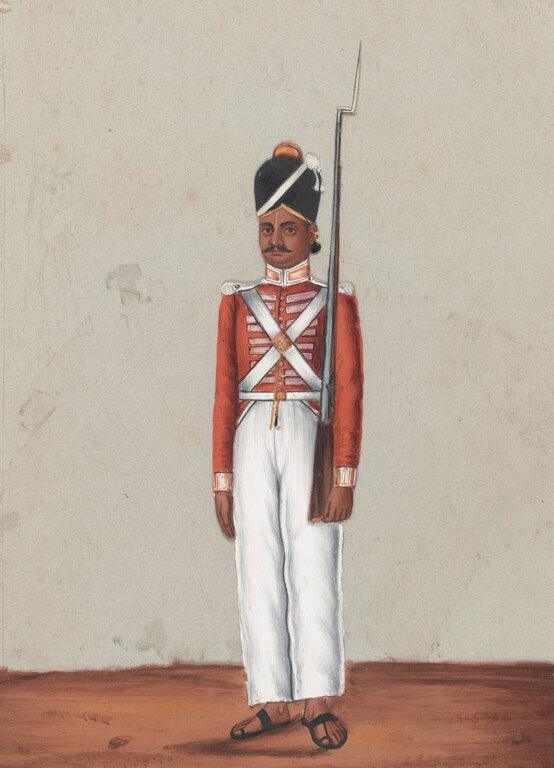
c. 1835 illustration of a Madras Army sepoy

The Madras Army of the Honourable East India Company came into being through the need to protect the Company's commercial interests. These were mostly untrained guards, with only some bearing arms. The French attack and capture of Madras in 1746 forced the British hand. In 1757, the East India Company decided to raise well-trained military units to conduct operations, conquer territory, and demand allegiance from local rulers.

The loosely organised military units were later combined into battalions with Indian officers commanding local troops. One of the first major actions fought by these troops was the Battle of Wandiwash in 1760. The troops were highly praised for their steadiness under fire. Earlier a good part of the force was sent to Bengal under young Clive, who made history and a personal fortune after the Battle of Plassey.

The Madras Army officers were in the early years very conscious of the soldiers' local customs, caste rituals, dress, and social hierarchy. Some leading landowners joined the Madras Army, one of whom is recorded as Mootoo (Muthu) Nayak from the nobility in Madura. As the army expanded and new officers came in, mostly from Company sources, the leadership style and care of the men changed for the worse. A notable incident in the Madras Army during this period was the Vellore mutiny. After Tipu Sultan was killed, his two sons were held in British custody in Vellore Fort. On the night of 10 July 1806 the sepoys of three Madrasi regiments garrisoning Vellore Fort mutinied, killing 129 British officers and soldiers. The rising, caused by a mixture of military and political grievances, was suppressed within hours by a force which included loyal Madras cavalry.

In the 1830s the Madras Army was concerned with internal security and support for the civil administration. This was a multi-ethnic army in which the British officers were encouraged to learn and speak Asian languages. In 1832–33 superior discipline and training enabled the Madras Army to put down a rebellion in the Visakhapatnam district.

== Under the British Raj ==
=== Post-1857 history ===
The Army of the Madras Presidency remained almost unaffected by the Indian Rebellion of 1857. By contrast with the larger Bengal Army where all but twelve (out of eighty-four) infantry and cavalry regiments either mutinied or were disbanded, all fifty-two regiments of Madras Native Infantry remained loyal and passed into the new Indian Army when direct British Crown rule replaced that of the Honourable East India Company. Four regiments of Madras Light Cavalry and the Madras Artillery batteries did however disappear in the post-1858 reorganisation of the Presidency Armies. The Madras Fusiliers (a regiment of European infantry recruited by the East India Company for service in India) was transferred to the regular British Army.

=== End of the separate Madras Army ===
In 1895, the three separate Presidency Armies began a process of unification which was not to be concluded until the Kitchener reforms of eight years later. As an initial step the Army of India was divided into four commands, each commanded by a lieutenant-general. These comprised Madras (including Burma), Punjab (including the North West Frontier), Bengal and Bombay (including Aden). In 1903 the separately numbered regiments of the Madras, Bombay and Bengal Armies were unified in a single organisational sequence and the presidency affiliations disappeared.

=== Disbanding of Madras infantry regiments ===
While the Madras Army remained in existence as a separate entity until 1895, twelve of the Madras Native Infantry regiments were disbanded between 1862 and 1864. A further eight went in 1882, three between 1902 and 1904, two in 1907 and four in 1922. The remainder were disbanded between 1923 and 1933, leaving the highly regarded Madras Sappers and Miners as the only Madrasi unit in the Indian Army until a new Madras Regiment was raised in 1942, during World War II. Both of these regiments continue to exist in the modern Indian Army.

The gradual phasing out of Madrasi recruitment for the Indian Army in the late 19th century, in favour of Sikhs, Rajputs, Dogras and Punjabi Mussalmans, was justified by General Sir Frederick Roberts on the grounds that long periods of peace and inactivity in Southern India had rendered the Madras infantry soldier inferior to the Martial Races of the North. The military historians John Keegan and Philip Mason have however pointed out that under the "watertight" Presidency Army system, Madras regiments had little opportunity of active service on the North-West Frontier. As a result, the more ambitious and capable British officers of the Indian Army opted for service with Punjabi and other northern units and the overall efficiency of the Madras Army suffered accordingly.

== Composition in 1856 ==
=== Light Cavalry ===
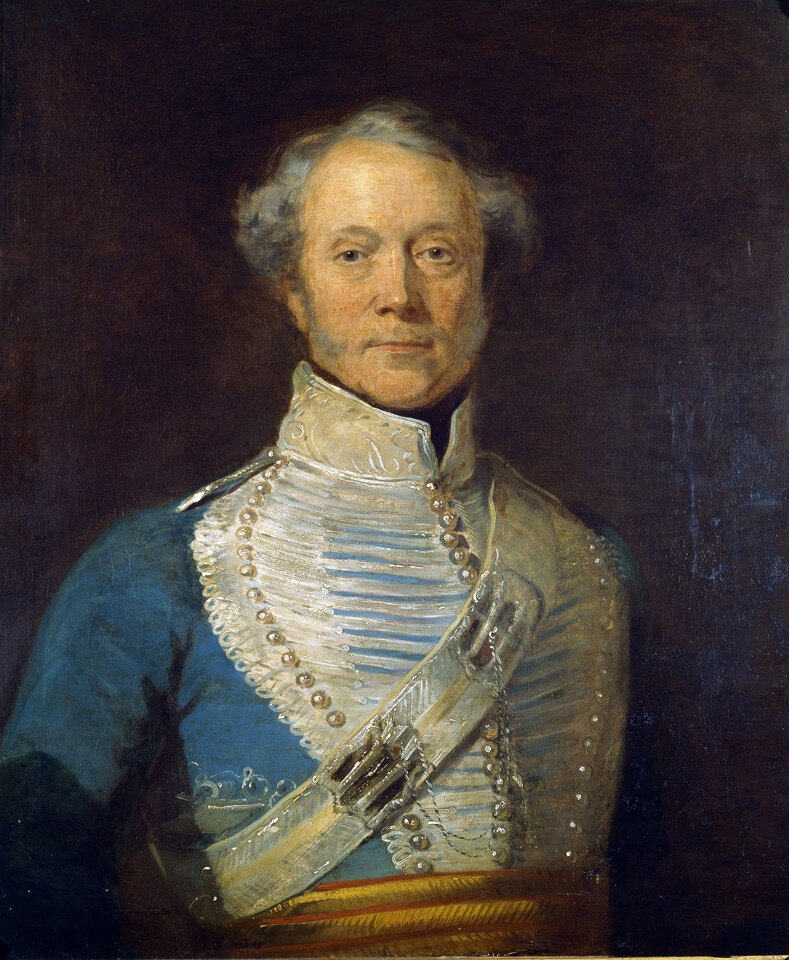
c. 1845 portrait of a 7th Madras Light Cavalry major

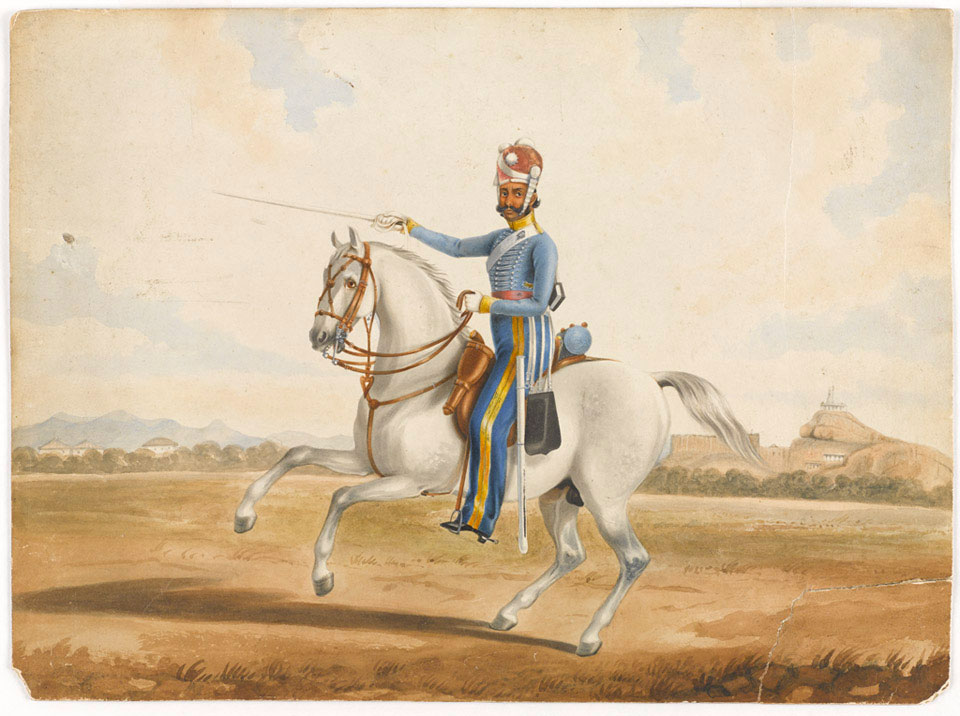
c. 1847 painting of a Madras Light Cavalry sowar

These were:

- 1st Regiment of Light Cavalry
- 2nd Regiment of Light Cavalry
- 3rd Regiment of Light Cavalry
- 4th Regiment of Light Cavalry
- 5th Regiment of Light Cavalry
- 6th Regiment of Light Cavalry
- 7th Regiment of Light Cavalry
- 8th Regiment of Light Cavalry

=== Artillery ===
These were:

==== Horse Artillery (1 Brigade) ====
- 4 European Troops
- 2 Native Troops

==== Foot Artillery ====
- 4 European Battalions (4 companies each)
- 1 Native Battalion (6 companies)

=== Engineers ===
- Corps of Engineers
- Corps of Madras Sappers and Miners

=== Infantry ===
==== European Infantry ====
These were:

- 1st European Fusiliers
- 2nd European Light Infantry
- 3rd European Regiment

==== Native Infantry ====
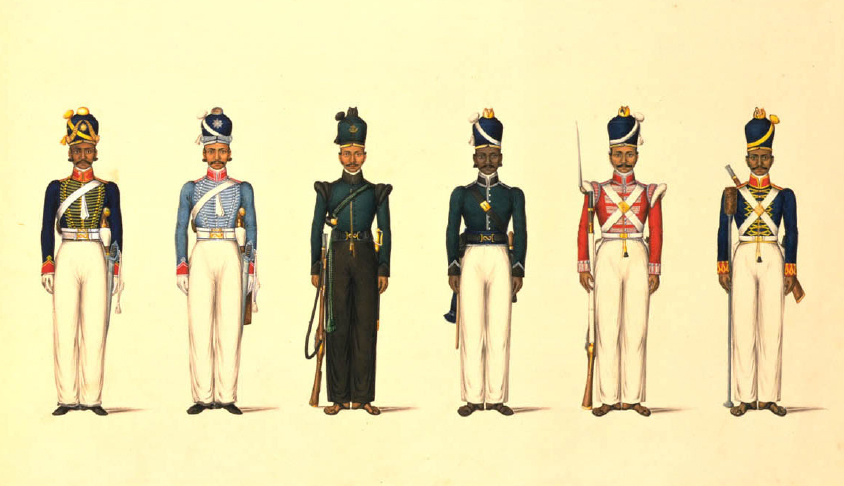
c. 1830 painting depicting six Madras Army soldiers. Left to right: Madras Horse Artillery, Madras Light Cavalry, Madras Rifle Corps, Madras Pioneers, Madras Native Infantry and the Madras Foot Artillery.

These were:

- 1st Regiment of Madras Native Infantry (Rifle Company Attached)
- 2nd Regiment of Madras Native Infantry
- 3rd (Palamcottah) Light Infantry
- 4th Regiment of Madras Native Infantry
- 5th Regiment of Madras Native Infantry (Rifle Company Attached)
- 6th Regiment of Madras Native Infantry
- 7th Regiment of Madras Native Infantry
- 8th Regiment of Madras Native Infantry
- 9th Regiment of Madras Native Infantry
- 10th Regiment of Madras Native Infantry
- 11th Regiment of Madras Native Infantry
- 12th Regiment of Madras Native Infantry
- 13th Regiment of Madras Native Infantry
- 14th Regiment of Madras Native Infantry
- 15th Regiment of Madras Native Infantry
- 16th Regiment of Madras Native Infantry (Rifle Company Attached)
- 17th Regiment of Madras Native Infantry
- 18th Regiment of Madras Native Infantry
- 19th Regiment of Madras Native Infantry
- 20th Regiment of Madras Native Infantry
- 21st Regiment of Madras Native Infantry
- 22nd Regiment of Madras Native Infantry
- 23rd (Wallajahbad) Light Infantry
- 24th Regiment of Madras Native Infantry (Rifle Company Attached)
- 25th Regiment of Madras Native Infantry
- 26th Regiment of Madras Native Infantry (Rifle Company Attached)
- 27th Regiment of Madras Native Infantry
- 28th Regiment of Madras Native Infantry
- 29th Regiment of Madras Native Infantry
- 30th Regiment of Madras Native Infantry
- 31st (Trichinopoly) Light Infantry
- 32nd Regiment of Madras Native Infantry
- 33rd Regiment of Madras Native Infantry
- 34th (Chicacole) Light Infantry
- 35th Regiment of Madras Native Infantry
- 36th Regiment of Madras Native Infantry (Rifle Company Attached)
- 37th (Grenadiers) Regiment of Madras Native Infantry
- 38th Regiment of Madras Native Infantry (Rifle Company Attached)
- 39th Regiment of Madras Native Infantry
- 40th Regiment of Madras Native Infantry
- 41st Regiment of Madras Native Infantry
- 42nd Regiment of Madras Native Infantry
- 43rd Regiment of Madras Native Infantry
- 44th Regiment of Madras Native Infantry
- 45th Regiment of Madras Native Infantry
- 46th Regiment of Madras Native Infantry
- 47th Regiment of Madras Native Infantry
- 48th Regiment of Madras Native Infantry
- 49th Regiment of Madras Native Infantry (Rifle Company Attached)
- 50th Regiment of Madras Native Infantry
- 51st Regiment of Madras Native Infantry
- 52nd Regiment of Madras Native Infantry

== Units raised during 1857 rebellion ==
These were:

- 1st Extra Regiment of Native Infantry
- 2nd Extra Regiment of Native Infantry
- 3rd Extra Regiment of Native Infantry
- Madras Sapper Militia

== Composition in 1864 ==
=== Light Cavalry ===
These were:

- 1st Regiment of Light Cavalry
- 2nd Regiment of Light Cavalry
- 3rd Regiment of Light Cavalry
- 4th Regiment of Light Cavalry

=== Engineers ===
- Corps of Engineers
- Corps of Madras Sappers and Miners

=== Native Infantry ===
These were:

- 1st Native Infantry (Rifle Company Attached)
- 2nd Native Infantry
- 3rd (Palamcottah) Light Infantry
- 4th Native Infantry
- 5th Native Infantry (Rifle Company Attached)
- 6th Native Infantry
- 7th Native Infantry
- 8th Native Infantry
- 9th Native Infantry
- 10th Native Infantry
- 11th Native Infantry
- 12th Native Infantry
- 13th Native Infantry
- 14th Native Infantry
- 15th Native Infantry
- 16th Native Infantry (Rifle Company Attached)
- 17th Native Infantry
- 19th Native Infantry
- 20th Native Infantry
- 21st Native Infantry
- 22nd Native Infantry
- 23rd (Wallajahbad) Light Infantry
- 24th Native Infantry (Rifle Company Attached)
- 25th Native Infantry
- 26th Native Infantry (Rifle Company Attached)
- 27th Native Infantry
- 28th Native Infantry
- 29th Native Infantry
- 30th Native Infantry
- 31st (Trichinopoly) Light Infantry
- 32nd Native Infantry
- 33rd Native Infantry
- 34th (Chicacole) Light Infantry
- 35th Native Infantry
- 36th Native Infantry (Rifle Company Attached)
- 37th Native Infantry (Grenadiers)
- 38th Native Infantry (Rifle Company Attached)
- 39th Native Infantry
- 40th Native Infantry
- 41st Native Infantry

== List of Commanders of the Fort St George garrison ==
Commanders included:

- Lieutenant Jermin (1640–49)
- Lieutenant Richard Minors (1649–51)
- Captain James Martin (1651–54)
- Lieutenant Richard Minors (1654–55)
- Sergeant Thomas Sutton (1655–58)
- Captain Roger Middleton (1658–60)
- Lieutenant William Hull (1660)
- Captain Thomas Axtell (1661–64)
- Lieutenant Francis Chuseman (1664–68)
- Lieutenant Timothy Sutton (1668–73)
- Captain Philip O' Neale (1673–80)
- Captain James Bett (1680–92)
- Captain Francis Seaton (1692–1707)
- Captain Gabriel Poirier (1707–16)
- Major John Roach (1716–19)
- Captain Alexander Fullerton (1719–23)
- Captain Alexander Sutherland (1723–24)
- Major John Roach (1724–29)
- Major David Wilson (1729–38)
- Captain Peter Eckman (1738–43)
- Major Charles Knipe (1743)
- Captain Peter Eckman (1743–46)

== Commanders-in-Chief ==
Commanders-in-chief included:
Commander-in-Chief, Madras Army

- Major Stringer Lawrence (1st term) (1748–1749)
- Captain Rodolphus de Gingens (1749–1752)
- Major Stinger Lawrence (2nd term) (1752–1754)
- Lieutenant-Colonel John Adlercron (1754–1757)
- Lieutenant-Colonel Stringer Lawrence (3rd term) (1757–1759)
- Colonel Eyre Coote (1759–1761)
- Major-General Stringer Lawrence (4th term) (1761–1766)
- Brigadier General John Caillaud (1766–1767)
- Brigadier General Joseph Smith (1767–1770)
- Major General Eyre Coote (1770)
- Brigadier General Joseph Smith (1770–1772)
- Colonel Sir Robert Fletcher (1772–1773)
- Brigadier General Joseph Smith (1773–1775)
- Brigadier General Sir Robert Fletcher (1775–1776)
- Brigadier General James Stuart (1776–1777, serving the Majority in Council during the coup ousting Governor George Pigot)
- Colonel Ross Lang (1777–1778)
- Major General Sir Hector Munro (1778–1782)
- Major General James Stuart (1782–1783)
- Colonel Sir John Burgoyne (17 Sept 1783)
- Lieutenant General Ross Lang (1783–1785)
- Lieutenant General Sir John Dalling (1785–1786)
- Major General Sir Archibald Campbell (1786–1789, while Governor of Madras)
- Brigadier General Mathew Horne and Colonel John Floyd (1789–1790)
- Major General William Medows (1790–1792, while Governor of Madras)
- Major-General John Braithwaite (1792–1796)
- Major-General Alured Clarke (1796–1797)
- Major-General George Harris (1797–1800)
- Major-General John Braithwaite (1800–1801)
- Major-General James Stuart (1801–1804)
- Major-General John Cradock (1804–1807)
- Lieutenant-General Hay McDowall (1807–1809)
- Major-General George Hewett (1810)
- Major-General Sir Samuel Auchmuty (1810–1813)
- Lieutenant-General Sir John Abercromby (1813)
- Lieutenant-General Sir Thomas Hislop (1814–1820)
- Lieutenant-General Sir Alexander Campbell (1820–1825)
- Lieutenant-General Sir George Walker (1825–1831)
- Lieutenant-General Sir Robert O'Callaghan (1831–1836)
- Lieutenant-General Sir Peregrine Maitland (1836–1838)
- Lieutenant-General Sir Jasper Nicolls (1838–1839)
- Lieutenant-General Sir Samuel Whittingham (1839–1841)
- Lieutenant-General The Marquess of Tweeddale (1842–1848)
- Lieutenant-General Sir George Berkeley (1848–1851)
- Lieutenant-General Sir Richard Armstrong (1851–1853)
- Lieutenant-General William Staveley (1853–1854)
- Lieutenant-General George Anson (1854–1856)
- Lieutenant-General Sir Patrick Grant (1856–1861)
- Lieutenant-General Sir James Grant (1861–1864)
- Lieutenant-General Sir John Le Marchant (1865–1867)
- Lieutenant-General William McCleverty (1867–1871)
- Lieutenant-General Sir Frederick Haines (1871–1876)
- Lieutenant-General Sir Neville Chamberlain (1876–1880)
- Lieutenant-General Sir Frederick Roberts (1880–1885)
- Lieutenant-General Sir Herbert Macpherson (1886)
- Lieutenant-General Sir Charles Arbuthnot (1886–1891)
- Lieutenant-General Sir James Dormer (1891–1893)
- Lieutenant-General Sir Charles Clarke (1893–1895)

Commander-in-Chief, Madras Command

- Lieutenant-General Sir Charles Clarke (1895–1898)
- Lieutenant-General Sir George Wolseley (1898–1903)
  - (acting) Major-General Sir George Pretyman (1902) during Wolseley's extended leave following his wife's death
- Lieutenant-General Sir Charles Egerton (1903–1907)

== Table of Organisation ==
The following data has been retrieved from The Quarterly Indian Army List for 1 January 1901. This date was chosen for being in a suitable time period at the end of the Madras Army.

	British personnel	Indian Officers	Other Ranks	Total
Native Cavalry Regiment	Commandant 4 Squadron Commanders 5 Squadron Officers Adjudant Medical Officer	Subadar-Major 7 Subadars 8 Jamadars	Havildar Major, 36 Havildars Farrier-Major, 8 Farrier Havildars, Trumpet Major 36 Naiks	628 per regiment
Native Cavalry Regiment	Commandant 4 Squadron Commanders 5 Squadron Officers Adjudant Medical Officer	Subadar-Major 7 Subadars 8 Jamadars	486 Sowars (including 4 Ward Orderlies) 8 Trumpeters, 4 Shoeing smiths 4 Veterinary Pupils, 8 Recruit Boys, 7 Pension Boys	628 per regiment
Corps of Madras Sappers and Miners	Commandant 2 Superintendents Adjudant 11 Company Commanders 11 Company Officers	9 Subadars 18 Jamadars	67 Havildars 103 Naiks	1847 total
Corps of Madras Sappers and Miners	Warrant Officer, Regimental Sergeant Major Regimental Quartermaster Sergeant, 2 Quartermaster Segreant Instructors, 5 Company Sergeant Majors 38 British Non-commissioned Officers	9 Subadars 18 Jamadars	1426 Sappers 18 Buglers 90 Drivers 42 Recruit and Pension Boys	1847 total
Native Infantry Regiment	Commandant 4 Double-company Commanders 3 Double-company Officers Adjudant Quartermaster Medical Officer	Subadar-Major 7 Subadars 8 Jamadars	Havildar Major, 40 Havildars 40 Naiks	865 per regiment
Native Infantry Regiment	Commandant 4 Double-company Commanders 3 Double-company Officers Adjudant Quartermaster Medical Officer	Subadar-Major 7 Subadars 8 Jamadars	16 Drummers 720 Sepoys (including 4 Ward Orderlies) 12 Recruit Boys, 9 Pension Boys	865 per regiment

The Madras Sappers and Miners were authorised 9 mules.

The 10th, 12th, 32nd, and 33rd Regiments of Madras Infantry were authorised 20 supernumerary personnel each. The 20th Regiment of Madras Infantry was authorised 1 extra Jamadar to carry an honorary colour. Each Pioneer Regiment was authorised 24 Artificers each (2 Havildars, 2 Naiks and 20 Sepoys). The Havildar and Naik Artificers were supernumerary NCOs. Recruit and Pension Boys were not authorised for Burma Infantry Regiments.

== See also ==
- Presidency armies
- Bengal Army
- Bombay Army

== Sources ==
- Frederick, J. B. M. (1984). Lineage Book of British Land Forces 1660–1978, Volume II. Wakefield, United Kingdom: Microform Academic Publishers. ISBN 1-85117-008-1.
- Keegan, John (1984). World Armies. Gale Group. ISBN 978-0-8103-1515-0.
- Mason, Philip (1986). A Matter of Honour - an Account of the Indian Army. Penguin Books. ISBN 0-333-41837-9.
- Raugh, Harold (2004). The Victorians at War, 1815–1914: An Encyclopedia of British Military History. ABC-CLIO Ltd. ISBN 978-1-57607-925-6.
- Schmidt, Karl J. (1995). An Atlas and Survey of South Asian History. M. E. Sharpe. p. 60. ISBN 978-1-56324-333-2. "1757 madras army."
- Baines, Athelstane (22 March 2021). Ethnography (Castes and Tribes): With a List of the More Important Works on Indian Ethnography by W. Siegling. De Gruyter. p. 54. ISBN 978-3-11-238388-9. "The Telaga were once a military caste, and were till recently recruited for the native regiments of the British army, but now they are cultivators of a moderately high position, and only differ from their neighbours in being somewhat more fully Brahmanised."
