= 75th Carnatic Infantry =

- Active: 1776-1922
- Country: Indian Empire
- Branch: Army
- Type: Infantry
- Part of: Madras Army (to 1895); Madras Command
- Colours: Red; faced orange, 1882 yellow.
- Engagements: Carnatic Wars; Second Anglo-Mysore War; Third Anglo-Mysore War; Third Burmese War; World War I

The 75th Carnatic Infantry were an infantry regiment of the British Indian Army. They could trace their origins to 1776, when they were raised as the 15th Carnatic Battalion by enlisting men from the 2nd, 6th and 12th Carnatic Battalions.

Their first action was during the Carnatic Wars. Followed by the Battle of Sholinghur in the Second Anglo-Mysore War, they also took part in the Third Anglo-Mysore War and the Third Burmese War.

After World War I the Indian government reformed the army moving from single battalion regiments to multi battalion regiments. In 1922, the 75th Carnatic Infantry became the 2nd Battalion, 3rd Madras Regiment. After independence this new regiment was allocated to the Indian Army.

== Changes in designation ==
- 15th Carnatic Battalion - 1776
- 15th Madras Battalion - 1784
- 2nd Battalion, 4th Madras Native Infantry - 1796
- 15th Madras Native Infantry - 1824
- 15th Madras Infantry - 1885
- 75th Carnatic Infantry - 1903
- 2nd Battalion, 3rd Madras Regiment - 1922
- 2nd Battalion, The Madras Regiment (army of independent India) - 1947

== Sources ==
- Barthorp, Michael; Burn, Jeffrey (1979). Indian infantry regiments 1860-1914. Osprey Publishing. ISBN 0-85045-307-0.
- Rinaldi, Richard A (2008). Order of Battle British Army 1914. Ravi Rikhye. ISBN 978-0-9776072-8-0.
- Sharma, Gautam (1990). Valour and sacrifice: famous regiments of the Indian Army. Allied Publishers. ISBN 81-7023-140-X.
- Sumner, Ian (2001). The Indian Army 1914-1947. Osprey Publishing. ISBN 1-84176-196-6.
- Moberly, F. J. (1 September 1997) [1923]. Official History of the War: Mesopotamia Campaign. London: Imperial War Museum. ISBN 1-870423-30-5.
