= 65th Carnatic Infantry =

- Active: 1759-1904
- Country: Indian Empire
- Branch: Army
- Type: Infantry
- Part of: Madras Army (to 1895); Madras Command
- Colors: Red; faced black, 1882 yellow
- Engagements: Carnatic Wars; Sholinghur; Third Anglo-Mysore War; Second Burmese War

The 65th Carnatic Infantry were an infantry regiment of the British Indian Army. They could trace their origins to 1759, when they were raised as the 6th Battalion Coast Sepoys.

The regiment took part in the Carnatic Wars in 1746–1763 and then the Third Anglo-Mysore War. They were disbanded in 1904.

== Predecessor names ==
- 6th Battalion Coast Sepoys - 1759
