= 74th Punjabis =

- Active: 1776-1922
- Country: Indian Empire
- Branch: Army
- Type: Infantry
- Part of: Madras Army (to 1895); Madras Command
- Colors: Red; faced buff, 1882 white, 1905 green, 1911 emerald green
- Engagements: Carnatic Wars; Second Anglo-Mysore War; Third Anglo-Mysore War; First Opium War; Second Opium War; Third Burmese War; World War I

The 74th Punjabis were an infantry regiment of the British Indian Army. They could trace their origins to 1776, when they were raised as the 14th Carnatic Battalion.

The regiment first saw action during the Carnatic Wars. This was followed by the Battle of Sholinghur in the Second Anglo-Mysore War and the Battle of Mahidpur in the Third Anglo-Mysore War. Their next active service was in China for the First and Second Opium Wars. In 1885 they took part in the Third Burmese War.

In 1914 the class composition of the 74th Punjabis consisted of 4 companies of Punjabi Muslims, 2 of Sikhs and 2 of Punjabi Hindus. This diversity was in accordance with the enlistment system of the period; under which about three-quarters of the Indian regiments were each recruited from more than one religious or racial groups. The 74th Punjabis had historically been a Madrasi regiment (see below) but as part of a general policy the area of recruitment had changed to the Punjab after 1889.

During World War I the regiment was part of the 8th Lucknow Division which initially remained in India on internal security and training duties. They were posted to the 10th (Irish) Division in 1918, and took part in the Sinai and Palestine Campaign.

After World War I the Indian government reformed the army moving from single battalion regiments to multi battalion regiments. In 1922, the 74th Punjabis became the 4th Battalion, 2nd Punjab Regiment. This new regiment was disbanded in 1947.

== Predecessor names ==
- 14th Carnatic Battalion - 1776
- 14th Madras Battalion - 1784
- 2nd Battalion, 6th Madras Native Infantry - 1796
- 14th Madras Native Infantry - 1824
- 14th Madras Infantry - 1885
- 74th Punjabis - 1903
