= 86th Carnatic Infantry =

- Active: 1794–1922
- Country: British India
- Branch: Army
- Type: Infantry
- Size: Battalion
- Part of: Madras Army (to 1895); Madras Command
- Colors: Red; faced dark green, 1882 green, 1898 emerald green
- Engagements: Fourth Anglo-Mysore War; First Burmese War; Second Burmese War; World War I

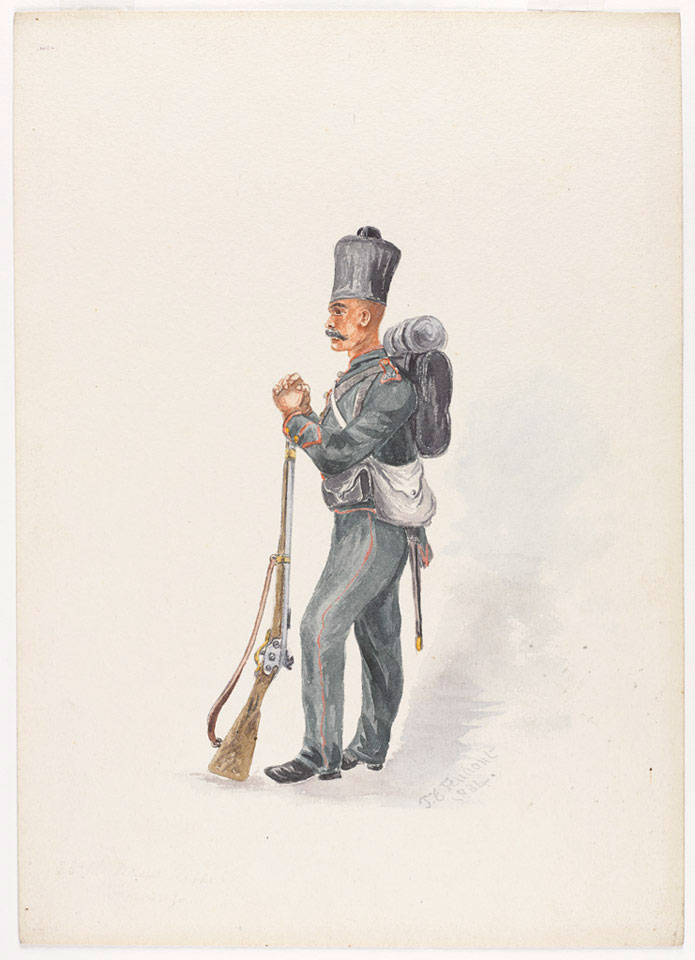
1884 illustration of a sepoy of the 26th Madras Infantry's rifle company

The 86th Carnatic Infantry was an infantry regiment originally raised in 1794 as the 36th Madras Native Infantry, part of the Presidency of Madras Army which was itself part of the Honourable East India Company Army. The presidency armies, like the presidencies themselves, belonged to the East India Company until the Government of India Act 1858 (passed in the aftermath of the Indian Rebellion of 1857) transferred all three presidencies to the direct authority of the British Crown. In 1903 all three presidency armies were merged into the British Indian Army. The unit was disbanded before Indian independence.

== History ==
Their first action was in the Battle of Nagpore in the Fourth Anglo-Mysore War; then the Battle of Kemendine in the First Burmese War. They returned to Burma in 1885, in the Second Burmese War. In January 1899 the regiment was posted to Mauritius.

During World War I they were attached to the 9th (Secunderabad) Division which remained in India, on internal security and training duties. After World War I the Indian government reformed the army moving from single battalion regiments to multi battalion regiments. In 1922, the 86th Carnatic Infantry became the 10th (Training) Battalion, 3rd Madras Regiment. The regiment was later disbanded for economic reasons.

== Predecessor names ==
- 36th Madras Native Infantry - 1794
- 2nd Battalion, 13th Madras Native Infantry - 1798
- 26th Madras Native Infantry - 1824
- 26th Madras Infantry - 1885
- 86th Carnatic Infantry - 1903
