= 87th Punjabis =

- Active: 1798–1922
- Country: Indian Empire
- Branch: Army
- Type: Infantry
- Part of: Madras Army (to 1895); Madras Command
- Colours: Red; faced black, 1882 yellow, 1905 green, 1911 emerald green
- Engagements: Third Anglo-Maratha War; Indian Rebellion of 1857; Second Burmese War; World War I

The 87th Punjabis were an infantry regiment of the British Indian Army. They could trace their origins to 1798, when they were raised as the 1st Battalion, 14th Madras Native Infantry.

The regiments first action was in the Battle of Mahidpur during the Third Anglo-Maratha War. Their next battle were in the Siege of Lucknow and the Capture of Lucknow during the Indian Rebellion of 1857. They were next sent into Burma to take part in the Second Burmese War in 1885. In January 1900 the regiment was posted in Mauritius.

During World War I they spent much of the time guarding the North West Frontier against incursions by Afghan tribesmen. They did send 1,400 men as reinforcements to other regiments and in 1917, were sent to take part in the Mesopotamia Campaign,

After World War I the Indian government reformed the army moving from single battalion regiments to multi battalion regiments. In 1922, the 87th Punjabis became the 5th Battalion, 2nd Punjab Regiment. This regiment was allocated to the Indian Army after independence.

== Predecessor names ==
- 1st Battalion, 14th Madras Native Infantry - 1798
- 27th Madras Native Infantry - 1824
- 27th Madras Infantry - 1885
- 87th Punjabis - 1903

== Sources ==
- Barthorp, Michael; Burn, Jeffrey (1979). Indian infantry regiments 1860-1914. Osprey Publishing. ISBN 0-85045-307-0.
- Rinaldi, Richard A (2008). Order of Battle British Army 1914. Ravi Rikhye. ISBN 978-0-9776072-8-0.
- Sharma, Gautam (1990). Valour and sacrifice: famous regiments of the Indian Army. Allied Publishers. ISBN 81-7023-140-X.
- Sumner, Ian (2001). The Indian Army 1914-1947. Osprey Publishing. ISBN 1-84176-196-6.
- Moberly, F. J. (1 September 1997) [1923]. Official History of the War: Mesopotamia Campaign. London: Imperial War Museum. ISBN 1-870423-30-5.
