= 88th Carnatic Infantry =

- Active: 1798–1922
- Country: Indian Empire
- Branch: Army
- Type: Infantry
- Part of: Madras Army (to 1895); Madras Command
- Colors: Red; faced black, 1882 yellow
- Engagements: Third Anglo-Maratha War; Fourth Anglo-Mysore War; Second Burmese War; Boxer Rebellion; World War I

The 88th Carnatic Infantry were an infantry regiment of the British Indian Army. They could trace their origins to 1798, when they were raised as the 2nd Battalion, 14th Madras Native Infantry.

The regiment's first action was in the Siege of Nagpore followed by the Battle of Mahidpur during the Third Anglo-Maratha War. They were involved in the First Burmese War (1823–26) and in 1900, they were part of the relief force in the Boxer Rebellion in China. During World War I they were attached to the 9th (Secunderabad) Division which remained in India on internal security and training duties. Later they took part in the Mesopotamia Campaign and took part in the fighting in Kurdistan in 1919. A second battalion was raised during the war, it was disbanded in 1921.

After World War I the Indian government reformed the army moving from single battalion regiments to multi battalion regiments. In 1922, the 88th Carnatic Infantry was one of the nine remaining single battalion regiments and was disbanded.

== Predecessor names ==
- 2nd Battalion, 14th Madras Native Infantry – 1798
- 28th Madras Native Infantry – 1824
- 28th Madras Infantry – 1885
- 88th Carnatic Infantry – 1903
