= Battle of Sholinghur =

1781 battle of the Second Anglo-Mysore War

- Part of the Second Anglo-Mysore War
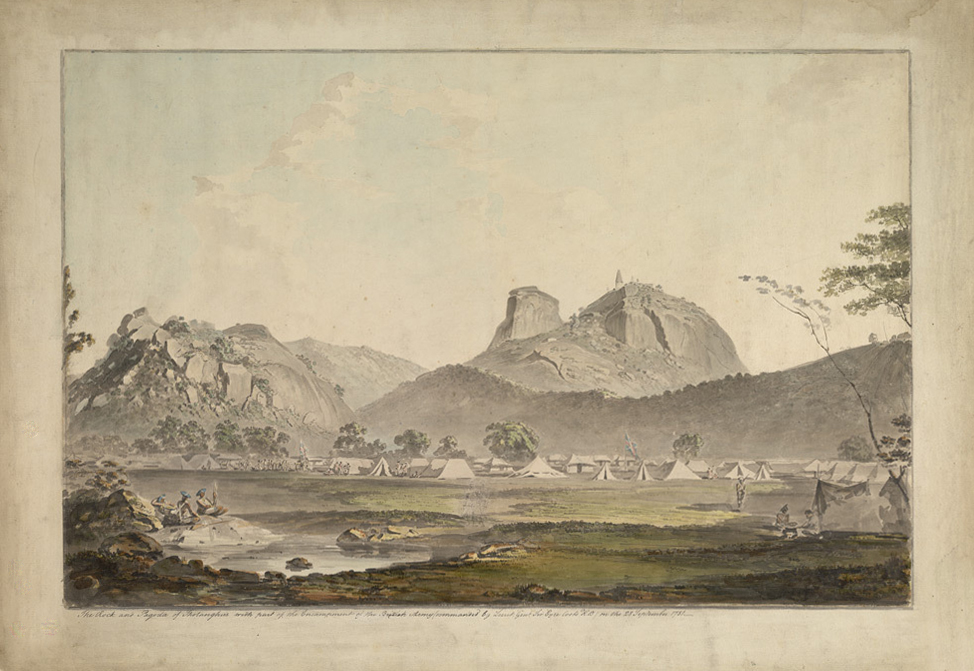
- 1781 watercolor showing British Army encamped at Sholinghur
Date	27 September 1781
Location	Sholinghur, present-day Tamil Nadu, India
Result	British victory

Belligerents
East India Company	Kingdom of Mysore

Commanders and leaders
Eyre Coote	Hyder Ali

The Battle of Sholinghur was fought on 27 September 1781 at Sholinghur, 80 kilometres (50 mi) West of Chennai (Madras), between forces of the Kingdom of Mysore led by Hyder Ali and East India Company forces led by General Eyre Coote. Haider Ali's forces were surprised by the company forces and they were expelled from the Carnatic with heavy casualties.

A battle honour, "Sholinghur", was awarded vide Gazette of India No 378 of 1889, which was awarded to fifteen units, seven of which are still in existence today. The battle honour is considered one of the repugnant battle honours of the Indian Army.
