= Thomas Pettigrew =

English surgeon, antiquarian and mummy unroller (1791–1865)

Thomas Joseph Pettigrew
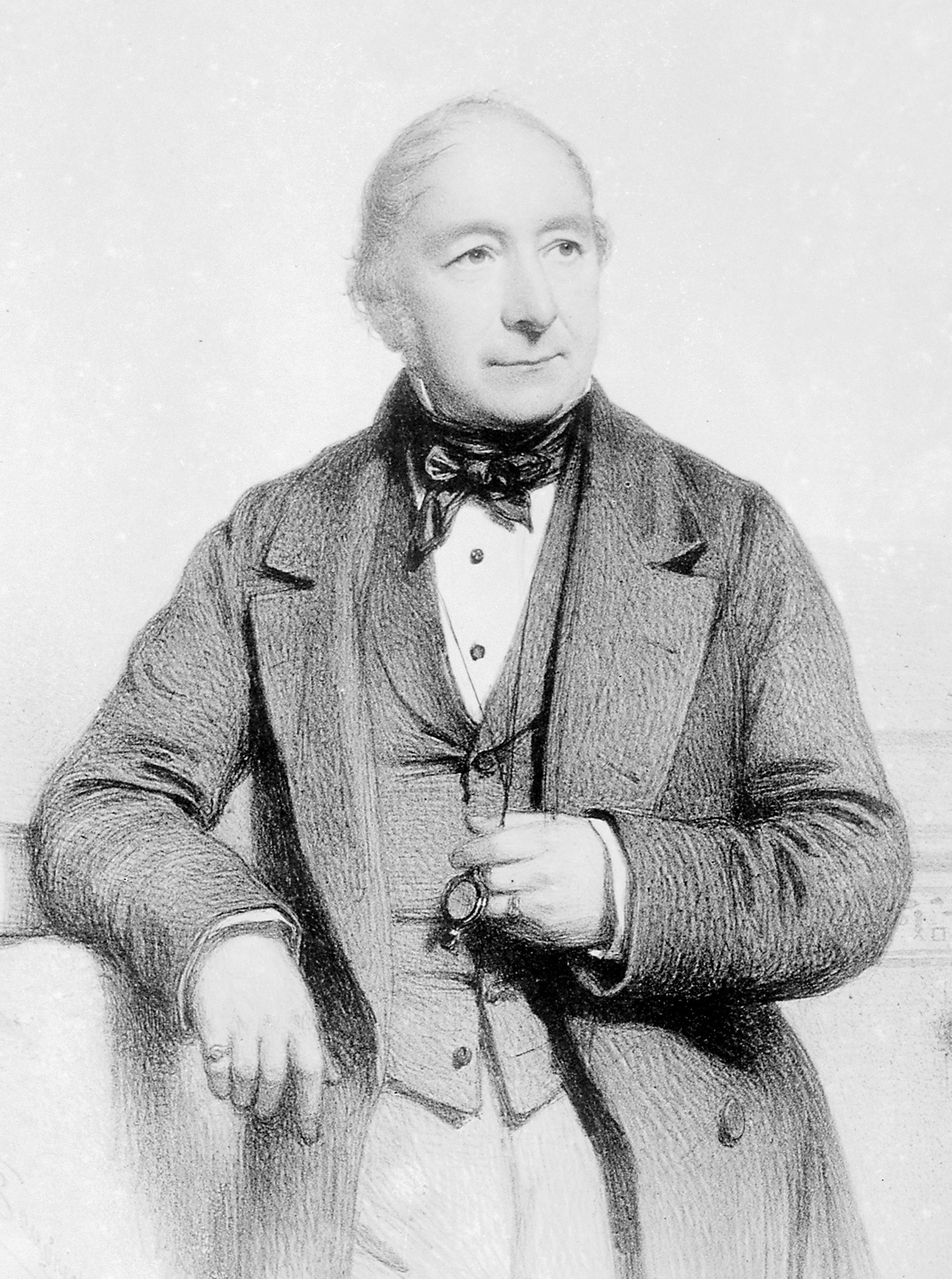
- Born: 28 October 1791; London
- Died: 23 November 1865
- Known for: Unwrapping mummies
- Scientific career
- Fields: Egyptology, surgery

Thomas Joseph Pettigrew FRS (28 October 1791 – 23 November 1865), sometimes known as "Mummy" Pettigrew, was an English surgeon and antiquarian who became an expert on Ancient Egyptian mummies. He became well known in London social circles for his private parties in which he unrolled and autopsied mummies for the entertainment of his guests.

== Early years ==
Thomas Joseph Pettigrew was born in London on 28 October 1791. His father, William Pettigrew, was a surgeon–apothecary who had formerly served as a naval surgeon on HMS Victory. Thomas demonstrated an interest in anatomy at an early age, conducting illicit autopsies. At the age of sixteen he became an apprentice to the surgeon John Taunton, assisting him in his clinical work and in the running of his anatomy school.

In 1808, when he was seventeen, he was among the group of young and intellectually curious apprentices who – at the instigation of John Tatum – formed the City Philosophical Society: Pettigrew gave an inaugural lecture on the subject of insanity. Michael Faraday, another member, would later conduct chemical analyses for Pettigrew on minerals and other materials found inside mummies.

== Career ==
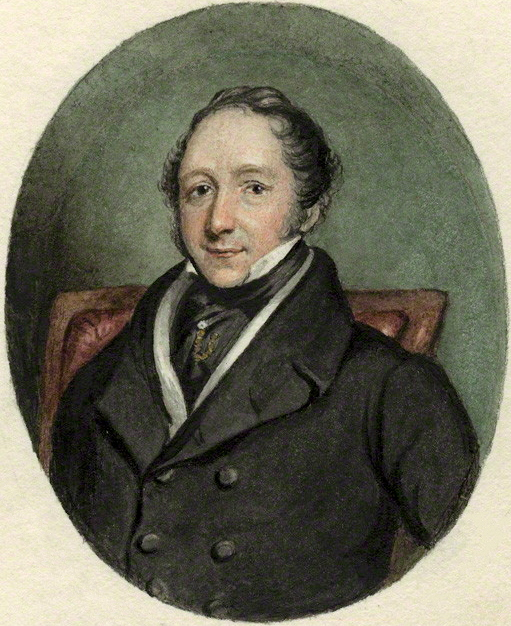
A young Thomas Joseph Pettigrew

Pettigrew's career began with an election as secretary to the Medical Society of London and, a year later, to the Royal Humane Society. These appointments led to him becoming the surgeon to the Duke of Sussex and Duke of Kent; due to this role he vaccinated the future Queen Victoria. He went on to become a surgeon at the Dispensary for the Treatment of Diseases of Children, the Asylum for Female Orphans, and the Royal West London Infirmary Dispensary, later Charing Cross Hospital.

He was also a professor of anatomy at the Charing Cross Hospital where he performed his earliest mummy unrollings before leaving the hospital in 1836 due to allegations of corruption. At the hospital Pettigrew gave lectures about anatomy, physiology, pathology, and the principles and practice of surgery. After leaving it he devoted himself to private practice, living in Savile Row.

Pettigrew had wide-ranging interests in antiquity, natural philosophy and the history of medicine ever since he was an apprentice and he maintained them throughout his life. Due to these interests he became a member of many learned societies including the Royal Society, the Society of Antiquaries, the Linnean Society, the Entomological Society, the Historical Society of Science and the Percy Society. He was a founding member of the British Archaeological Association and on the Association's first meeting at Canterbury in 1844, he unrolled a mummy as part of a programme of popular events. He would go on to serve terms as the treasurer and vice-president of the Association until his death in 1865. He was also a prominent freemason for many years before his death.

Pettigrew played an active role in intellectual Georgian and Victorian society, corresponding regularly with many well known surgeons, physicians, scientists, writers and artists, such as John Coakley Lettsom, Astley Cooper, Michael Faraday, George Cruikshank and Charles Dickens.

== Personal life ==
In 1811 Pettigrew married Elizabeth Reed. They had twelve children out of whom eight survived to adulthood. His son Dr William Vesalius Pettigrew regularly assisted him in his mummy unrollings. Another son, Samuel Thomas Pettigrew, became a chaplain in the East India Company and founded several key institutions in India, including Bishop Cotton Boys' School, Bishop Cotton Girls' School, St. Paul's Church, Bangalore, and All Saints' Church, Bangalore.

After his wife's death in 1854, he retired from medicine, and focused entirely on his antiquarian interests. He died at the age of 74 in 1865 and is buried in Brompton Cemetery, London. Seven months after his death his library was sold at Sotheby's. His three sons and three daughters survived him.

== Selected publications ==
- Memoirs of the life and writings of the late John Coakley Lettsom : with a selection from his correspondence ... in three volumes. London: Printed by Nichols, son, and Bentley, for Longman, Hurst, Rees, Orme, and Brown. 1817.
- Pettigrew, Thomas Joseph (1827). Bibliotheca Sussexiana.
- Observations on cholera; comprising a description of the epidemic cholera of India, London: S. Highley, 1831
- History of Egyptian mummies. Longman, Rees, Orme, Brown, Green and Longman. 1834.
- On superstitions connected with the history and practice of medicine and surgery. Half title:Superstition connected with medicine and surgery. London: J. Churchill. 1844.
- Memoirs of the life of Vice-Admiral Lord Viscount Nelson. London: T. & W. Boone. 1849.
- Chronicles of the tombs. London: H. G. Bohn. 1857.
- An inquiry into the particulars connected with the death of Amy Robsart (Lady Dudley), at Cumnor place, Berks, Sept 8, 1560. London: J. R. Smith. 1859.
- Medical portrait gallery. Biographical memoirs of the most celebrated physicians, surgeons, etc., etc., who have contributed to the advancement of medical science. London: Fisher, Son & Co. [1838-40]
- On the house of Gournay. London. 1863.

== See also ==
- Giovanni Battista Belzoni
- Mummia
