= Wollen =

Wollen may refer to

- Malcolm Wollen (1928–2013), Indian air marshal
- Peter Wollen (1938–2019), English film theorist and writer
- Philip Wollen (born 1950), Australian humanitarian philanthropist
- William Barnes Wollen (1857–1936), English painter
