= Lavelle =

Lavelle may refer to:

- Lavelle, Pennsylvania, a census-designated place located in Pennsylvania
- Lavelle Road, road in Bengaluru, India
- Lavelle (surname), a surname
