= Aiyappa =

Aiyappa is a surname. Notable people with the surname include:

- Apparanda Aiyappa (1913–?), British Indian Army officer
- Len Aiyappa (born 1979), Indian field hockey player
- Neravanda Aiyappa (born 1979), Indian cricketer
- Pramila Aiyappa (born 1977), Indian heptathlete
- Shubra Aiyappa (born 1987), Indian actress
