= Sultan Mahmood (general) =

Indian Army officer

- Born: Mysore, India
- Military career
- Allegiance: India
- Branch: Indian Army
- Rank: Major General
- Unit: Artillery
- Commands: Director General (Recruiting), New Delhi

Major General Sultan Mahmood was a General of the Indian Army.

== Biography ==
He was a born in Mysore, India, and is the younger brother of Lieutenant General Jameel Mahmood, ex-General Officer Commanding-in-Chief (GOC-in-C), Eastern Command of the Indian Army. He is a relative of Lieutenant General (retd.) Mohammad Ahmed Zaki of the Indian Army.

In the Indo-Pakistani War of 1965 commanded four medium guns in the Kashmir Valley. In the Indo-Pakistani War of 1971 he was part of the victorious force against East Pakistan. He later commanded an artillery brigade, serving as Brigadier-in-Charge in Punjab, and as the sub-area commander of Karnataka and Goa. Upon being promoted to the rank of major general he was appointed Director General (Recruiting) at the Army HQ in New Delhi.

As of 2001, he was one of only eight Muslims in the Indian Army to rise to the rank of major general.

He was an alumnus of the Bishop Cotton Boys' School, Bangalore, India.

== See also ==
- Hyderabadi Muslims
- Golkonda
- Hyderabad State
- Muslim culture of Hyderabad
- History of Hyderabad for a history of the city of Hyderabad.
- Hyderabad (India) for the city.
