= Bishop Cotton Boys' School =

All-boys school in India

- The School Arms

Location
- St. Mark's Road; Bengaluru, Karnataka; India; 12°58′7.0″N 77°35′55.6″E

Information
- Type: Private school
- Motto: Nec Dextrorsum Nec Sinistrorsum (Latin) (Neither to the right, nor to the left.)
- Established: 1865; 161 years ago
- Founder: Samuel Thomas Pettigrew
- Chairman: Rt. Rev. Martin C. Borgai (Bishop-In-Charge)–KCD
- Principal: Alistair R. A. Freese
- Enrollment: approx. 7,000
- Campus size: 14 acres (57,000 m^{2})
- Houses: Pope, Pettigrew, Elphick, Pakenham Walsh, Thomas
- Colors: Green and gold
- Publication: The Cottonian, The Cotton Mill
- Affiliation: ICSE, ISC
- Alumni: Old Cottonians
- Website: bishopcottonboysschool.edu.in

Bishop Cotton Boys' School is an all-boys school for boarders and day scholars in Bengaluru, India, founded in the memory of Bishop George Edward Lynch Cotton, Bishop of Calcutta.

The school is bordered by Residency Road, St Mark's Road, Lavelle Road and Vittal Mallya Road, and is spread over 14 acres (57,000 m^{2}) of land in the heart of Bangalore.

School heads in the early days included George Uglow Pope, Herbert Pakenham-Walsh, S. T. Pettigrew, William Elphick, Iowerth Lowell Thomas and A. T. Balraj.

The sister school Bishop Cotton Girls' School is located on the opposite side of St. Mark's Road.

== Origins ==
The school's past extends back to the British Raj and the Victorian era with its beginnings in a house on High Grounds over which now stands the great ITC Windsor Hotel. It was started in 1865 by Rev. S T Pettigrew, the then Chaplain of St. Mark's Cathedral who had a vision of starting a school for the education of children of European and Anglo-Indian families. In his own words, he wanted to "establish a day and boarding School for the Children of Christian residents in the station and its vicinity." The school was named in honour of George Cotton, Bishop of Calcutta, under whose stewardship a scheme of education was organized for the Anglican Churches in India. After India gained independence from the British in 1947, the school began to be, and is still governed by the Church of South India.

In the first five years of the school it had three principals. It was only with the arrival of George Uglow Pope, a distinguished Tamil scholar (who translated the famed Tirukkuṛaḷ into English) that the present site was acquired For Rs 47,500. The boys' school and the girls' school functioned on the same campus but under different heads. Under the stewardship of Pope, the school grew from strength to strength. A collegiate section was started and the school obtained recognition from the University of Madras. He gave the School its motto – 'Nec Dextrorsum Nec Sinistrorsum', meaning 'Neither to the right nor to the Left'.

When Pope left India in 1892 to take up the post of Reader at Oxford University, the standard of the school began to decline. By 1906, closure of the school was contemplated.

Henry Whitehead, Bishop of Madras, the chairman of the board of governors, as a last resort, invited the members of the Brotherhood of Saint Peter to save the school from closure. Herbert Pakenham-Walsh, of the Brotherhood of St. Peter, later to become Bishop, revived the school. The school still celebrates St. Peter's day amongst other traditions such as Guy Fawkes' bonfires. In 1911, the girls' school was moved across the road. William Elphick worked for a quarter of century for the growth of the school.

The last living member of the Brotherhood of St Peter in India, Father David, died of old age. He lived and worked in the school as the school chaplain.

Scouting was officially founded in British India in 1909, first starting at the Bishop Cotton Boys' School in Bangalore by Capt T.H Baker and Major Pakenham Walsh.

The houses for students were named after former principals of the school in a way of respecting their names.

== General K.S. Thimayya Memorial Trust ==
The General K.S. Thimayya Memorial Trust pays tribute to the School, in memory of General K. S. Thimayya, Cottonian (1918 to 1922). The Trust organises the annual Thimayya Memorial Lecture, and awards the Thimayya Medal to Cottonians who have demonstrated exemplary public service. The Trust also operates a Benevolent Fund that supports former staff members of the School, monetarily.

== Notable alumni ==
=== Science ===
- Nasir Ahmed, Indian-American electrical engineer, invented the discrete cosine transform
- B. Jayant Baliga, electrical engineer
- Mandyam Veerambudi Srinivasan, Australian bioengineer and neuroscientist
- Varghese Mathai, Australian mathematician
- Ananth Dodabalapur, Indian-American engineer
- Angus Finlay Hutton, British naturalist
- Raja Ramanna, Padma Vibhushan, scientist and former chairman, Atomic Energy Commission
- Kalidas Shetty, food scientist
- Edward Alfred Minchin, British zoologist

=== Military ===
- Apparanda Aiyappa, first Indian Signal officer in chief
- Jameel Mahmood, General Officer Commanding-in-Chief Eastern Command (1992–93)
- Sultan Mahmood, General
- Lalit Rai, Kargil War hero
- Leefe Robinson, British fighter pilot, Victoria Cross awardee
- Vijai Singh Shekhawat, former Chief of Naval Staff, Indian Navy
- Sir Frank Simpson, Vice Chief of the Imperial General Staff
- Kodandera Subayya Thimayya, former Chief of Army Staff, Indian Army
- Malcolm Wollen, former chairman of Hindustan Aeronautics limited
- Krishna Swaminathan, Chief of the Naval Staff

=== Positions of responsibility ===
- Norman Majoribanks, former governor of Madras
- Gopal Krishna Pillai, former Union Home Secretary, Government of India
- Dinesh Gundu Rao, Minister for Health and Family Welfare in the Government of Karnataka
- Akbar Mirza Khaleeli, Indian ambassador to Iran from 1980 to 1984 and Italy from 1986 to 1990
- A.R. Khaleel, former vice-president of the All India Football Federation (AIFF) and president of the Karnataka State Football Association
- Shahu II of Kolhapur, Member of Parliament from Kolhapur constituency and scion of the Kolhapur royal family
- C. V. Ranganathan, Indian diplomat and statesman
- Srinivasa IV Rao Sahib, ruler of the Jagir of Arni (1931 – 1948)
- Revathi Thirunal Balagopal Varma, titular Elayaraja of Travancore

=== Medicine ===
- Ajit Varki, Indian American physician-scientist
- Sudi Devanesen, Canadian family medicine physician and educator

=== Business ===
- Nandan Nilekani, Padma Bhushan, co-founder of Infosys and chairman of the Unique Identification Authority of India (UIDAI)
- Philip Wollen, Australian philanthropist, environmentalist and animal rights activist; former vice-president of Citibank
- Rohan Murty, Indian technical officer, junior fellow at the Harvard Society of Fellows, and the founder of the Murty Classical Library of India
- Bharat Goenka, Padma Shri, co-founder and managing director of Tally Solutions
- Kunal Agarwal, co-founder and CEO of Unravel Data
- Varun Agarwal, founder of Alma Mater
- Sam Balsara, founder, chairman and managing director of Madison World and Madison Communications
- Phaneesh Murthy, former CEO of IGATE
- Dilip Jajodia, British-Indian businessman

=== Arts ===
- Lucky Ali, Bollywood singer
- Biddu Appaiah, British-indian singer-songwriter, composer, and music producer
- Prabhu, Indian actor, businessman and film producer
- Ricky Kej, Padma Shri, Indian composer, music producer, three-time Grammy Award winner
- Feroz Khan, actor
- Brodha V, hip hop artist
- Ashvin Mathew, stage actor, stand-up comedian, screenwriter
- Ramkumar Ganesan, Indian film producer, actor
- Stuart Wolfe, British actor, sculptor

=== Sports ===
- Brijesh Patel, cricketer
- Colin Cowdrey, English cricketer
- Mayank Agarwal, cricketer
- Eugeneson Lyngdoh, footballer, MLA from Mawphlang constituency, Meghalaya
- David Mathias, cricketer, Bahrain national cricket team
- Amit Verma, cricketer
- Nihar Ameen, swimmer
- Ravikumar Samarth, cricketer, Karnataka cricket team

=== Other notable alumni ===
- Kenneth Anderson, Indian writer and hunter
- Tarun Khanna, American academic, author, and an economic strategist
- Makarand Paranjape, former director at Indian Institute of Advanced Study (IIAS), Shimla
- Timeri N. Murari, Indian novelist, journalist, playwright and screenwriter
- David Chellappa, Anglican bishop
