= Lazelle =

Lazelle is a surname. Notable people with the surname include:

- Henry Martyn Lazelle (1832–1917), American Civil War veteran
- Keith Lazelle (fl. 2008), American photographer

== See also ==
- Lavelle
