= Ananth Dodabalapur =

Indian-American engineer

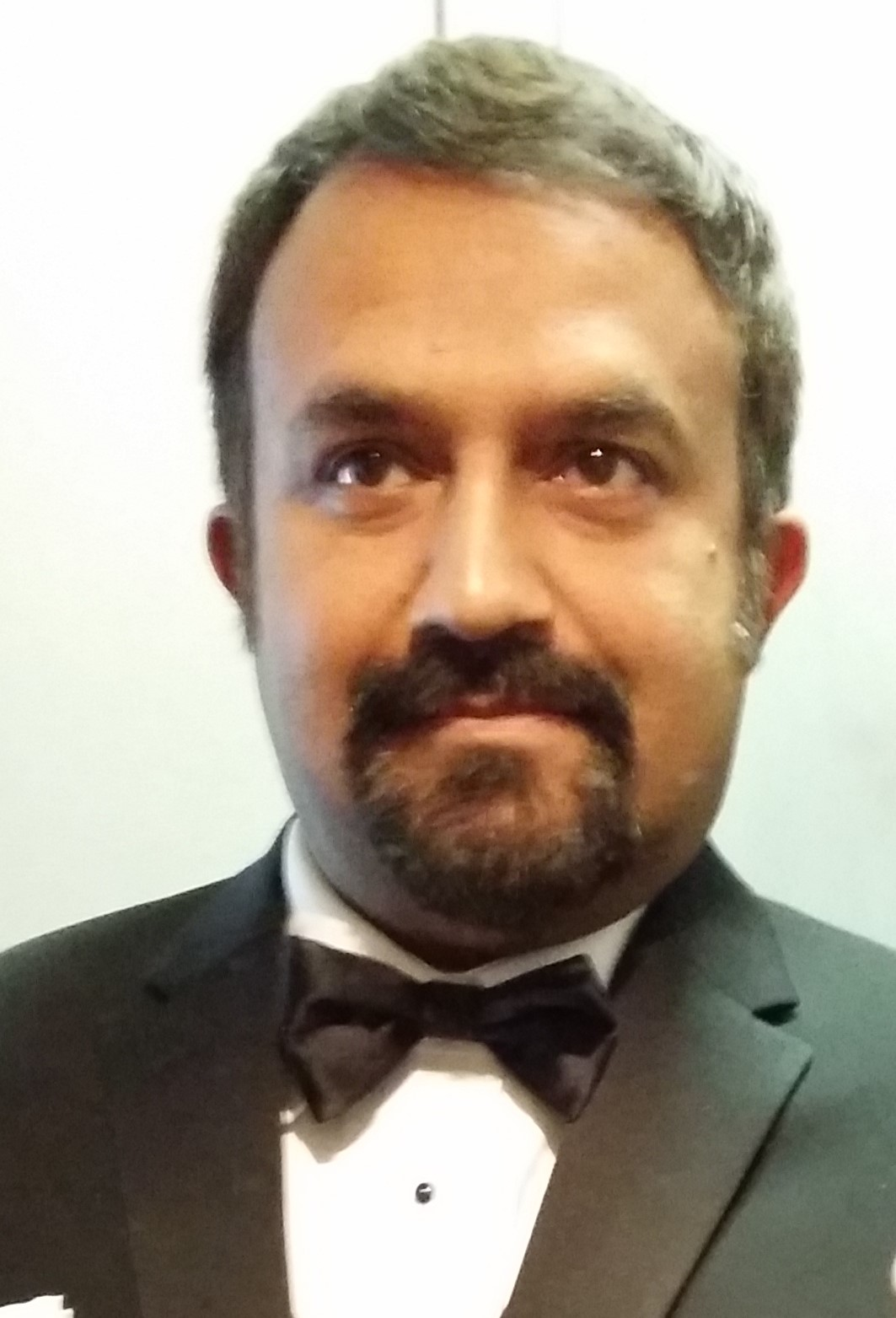

Ananth Dodabalapur is an Indian-American engineer, currently the Motorola Regents Chair Professor in Electrical and Computer Engineering, and previously the Ashley H. Priddy Centennial Professor, at University of Texas at Austin and a published author. He was formerly with Bell Labs, Murray Hill, NJ for more than 10 years. His career has included positions in academia, industrial research, start-up companies, and government.

== Research ==
His research has been in the areas of organic and inorganic semiconductor devices. His recent research is on nanoscale devices for 3D integrated circuits and new device architectures for displays, neuromorphic computing, printed electronics, and light emission. He has made pioneering contributions to the fields of Organic LEDs, transistors, and Photonic Crystal Lasers. He has also worked on chemical sensors and Nano-Optics. His research work has been cited more than 36,000 times. His H-index, according to Google Scholar, is approximately 100. He holds 27 US patents and these have been cited more than 2000 times. His research work has also included applied research done with the two companies he has co-founded - OrganiciD and Sensorbit Systems.

== Other Professional Positions ==
He co-founded OrganicID and was Chief Scientist between 2003-2006 [6,7]. OrganicID was acquired by Weyerhaeuser in 2006. He co-founded Sensorbit Systems and was President and Chief Scientist between 2010-2014. Sensorbit Systems was acquired by Edge3 in February 2015 [8-10]. He was the first Editor-in-Chief of Flexible and Printed Electronics, Published by the Institute of Physics, UK, between 2015-18. He served as a Program Director at the National Science Foundation in Alexandria, VA, between July 2024 and July 2026.

== Awards and recognition ==
He is a Fellow of the National Academy of Inventors and Institute of Electrical and Electronics Engineers and was a Distinguished Lecturer of the IEEE. He was listed in Who's Who in America and Who's who in Science and Engineering. He is a recipient of the 2002 National Award for Team Innovation from the American Chemical Society. His work on Organic Transistors has been listed in a compilation of key achievements in Electronics for the 20th century National Academy of Engineering#Greatest Engineering Achievements of the 20th Century in the category of Electronics. He has also made pioneering contributions to the fields of Organic LEDs and Photonic Crystal Lasers. In March 2007, he was conferred honorary citizenship of the City of Harrisburg, Pennsylvania.

== Personal and Family ==
Dodabalapur was born in Bangalore, India and attended Bishop Cotton Boys' School in Bangalore, Indian Institute of Technology Madras (where he received his bachelor's degree in Electrical Engineering), and University of Texas at Austin, where he obtained his Ph.D. degree in Electrical Engineering in 1990. He has received distinguished alumni awards from his alma maters Bishop Cotton Boys' School, Bangalore (in 2021), and his undergraduate institution, IIT Madras (in 2026).

Ananth Dodabalapur is married to Rati Chitnis Dodabalapur and has two children.
