= Phaneesh Murthy =

Indian technology businessman

Phaneesh Murthy (Kannada: ಫಣೀಶ್ ಮೂರ್ತಿ) is an Indian technology businessman. He was director of Infosys Ltd from 2000 to 2002. Subsequently, he became the chief executive officer of iGATE Corporation in 2003, after the company acquired his start-up Quintant. Murthy later became president in 2006 and was re-elected in 2010. He was president and CEO until May 2013. He is the CEO of Primentor, a consulting agency that mentors senior executives to promote hyper-growth.

== Early life ==
Phaneesh Murthy was born in a middle class family in Bangalore, Karnataka. He completed his schooling from Bishop Cotton Boys' School, Bangalore before receiving his B.Tech Degree in Mechanical Engineering from the Indian Institute of Technology, Madras and PGDMgt from Indian Institute of Management, Ahmedabad.

== Career ==
After graduating in 1987, Murthy started working for Sonata Software. After having worked with Sonata for 5 years, he moved to Infosys Ltd. Within two years of Murthy joining, Infosys picked up lucrative projects in Asia and Europe. His career progressed within Infosys, and he was Worldwide Head of Sales and Marketing, Communications, and the Product Solutions Group of Infosys Ltd. from 1995 to 2002.

Beginning in May 2000, he was both Director of Infosys and Director of Infosys BPO Ltd. As the Global Sales Head of Infosys, he was widely credited as the one who was responsible for taking the organization from just $2 million in revenues to $700 million in under 10 years. He left Infosys in 2002.

In July 2002, he co-founded Primentor, a consulting agency.

In January 2003, Murthy founded and was a consultant for Quintant Services Limited, a business services provisioning company with a global services delivery model.

Murthy joined iGATE Global Solutions Limited in August 2003 after the company acquired Quintant in late 2003. After joining iGATE, he played a key role in restructuring iGATE. He was instrumental in positioning the services companies under the iGATE Global umbrella, thereby resulting in synergies between the various service offerings of iGATE Global Solutions Ltd. In 2008, he was appointed as the CEO and President, and was the Managing Director of iGate Global Solutions Ltd. and iGATE Corporation. Murthy’s iTOPS model transformed iGATE from a mid-sized IT firm with a -20% operation loss to a company earning $1.2 billion in annual revenue.

Murthy is credited with the iGATE acquisition of Patni Computer Systems in 2011 for $1.22 billion. At the time of the acquisition, iGATE was a mid-sized company and Patni Computer Systems was more than double its size. The deal made iGATE one of the largest IT companies in India.

On 21 May 2013, Murthy left iGATE.

He co-founded PM Health & Life Care, an online marketplace for healthcare products, in March 2015. In August, Zigy.com was launched by PM Health & Life Care; Zigy.com is a managed online marketplace which connects chemists and druggists with consumers for direct purchases. Zigy received $5 million of initial funding in September 2015.

In 2016, Murthy joined Marlabs, a digital solutions provider, as a board member.

He is also on the board of directors at Opus. He previously was on the boards of eTouch, GlobalEdge, and New State Capital Partners.

== Philanthropy ==
iGATE has held golf tournaments at TPC Sawgrass which offer $100,000 in prizes to go toward charities. Murthy and his teammate Chip Perry took the top prize of $20,000. Murthy donated his $10,000 to Tiger Preservation.

In the mid-2000’s, he founded the Kabini Foundation, a non-profit organization dedicated to the conservation of the Kabini jungle system. In 2022, Murthy donated Q4i thermal drone technology to the Nagarahole Tiger Reserve. He also donated 9000 tracking cameras, which have been strategically placed in various locations throughout the reserve.

== Allegations ==
While at Infosys, two women filed lawsuits against Murthy. Despite Murthy strongly denying the accusations throughout proceedings, the lawsuits were settled out of court and he subsequently departed from Infosys.

In 2013, another lawsuit was labeled against Murthy by a subordinate employee. Murthy denied all the charges. An internal investigation showed that Murthy failed to report his relationship with the employee but didn’t violate the sexual harassment policy of the company. Despite this, iGate terminated its contract with Murthy.

In December 2013, Murthy sued iGate, contesting the basis of terminating his employment contract. He argued that iGate knew about his relationship with the subordinate employee and improperly used the reporting policy to terminate him. He also claimed that iGate withheld vested stocks due to him that were worth $17 million.
