= 77th Moplah Rifles =

- Active: 1777-1907
- Country: Indian Empire
- Branch: Army
- Type: Infantry
- Part of: Madras Army (to 1895); Madras Command
- Colors: Red; faced white 1903 Green; faced Scarlet
- Engagements: Carnatic Wars; Second Anglo-Mysore War; Third Anglo-Mysore War; Third Burmese War

The 77th Moplah Rifles were an infantry regiment of the British Indian Army. They could trace their origins to 1777, when they were raised as the 17th Carnatic Battalion.

== Early history ==
The regiment's first action was during the Carnatic Wars followed by the Battle of Sholinghur in the Second Anglo-Mysore War. They also took part in the Battle of Nagpore.

== Predecessor names ==
- 17th Carnatic Battalion - 1777
- 16th Madras Battalion - 1784
- 2nd Battalion, 5th Madras Native Infantry - 1796
- 16th Madras Native Infantry - 1824
- 17th Madras Infantry - 1861
- 1st Moplah Rifles - 1902
- 77th Moplah Rifles - 1903

== As Moplah Rifles ==
In 1902 the basis of recruitment for this regiment and one other (the 78th Moplah Rifles) was changed from Madrasis to Moplahs. The latter were Muslim immigrants of Arab origin who had settled along the coastal region of Malabar. In initial encounters the British had found the Moplars to be a warlike race and in 1901 it was decided to try and recruit them for the Indian Army. The 77th and 78th Moplar Rifles were accordingly raised as battalion-sized units

A problem from the beginning was that with a population basis totalling only one million the number of Moplah males available for recruitment was limited. In addition few British officers were immediately familiar with the language and culture of the community. While the 77th MR remained in Madras on garrison duty the 78th were assigned to active service on the North West Frontier in 1905. Used to a moist and humid environment the Moplah sepoys encountered difficulty in acclimatising to the harsh dry climate of the frontier region.

The two regiments of Moplah Rifles were assessed negatively in their final annual reports for both field and garrison service. Accordingly both were disbanded between April and July 1907 and their British officers reassigned.

== Uniform ==
The Arab origin of both Moplar regiments was reflected in the adoption of red fezs - an unusual item of uniform in the Indian Army of the period where turbans of various patterns were the norm. The uniforms of the 77th MR from 1903 to 1907 were of dark green serge with scarlet facings. The 78th MR revereded this pattern with scarlet jackets faced in green.

== Memorial at the St. Mark's Cathedral, Bangalore ==
After the regiment's disbandment, the military colours of the 77th Moplah Rifles was buried within the west wall of St. Mark's Cathedral, Bangalore. There is also a memorial for the lives lost in the Moplah revolt.

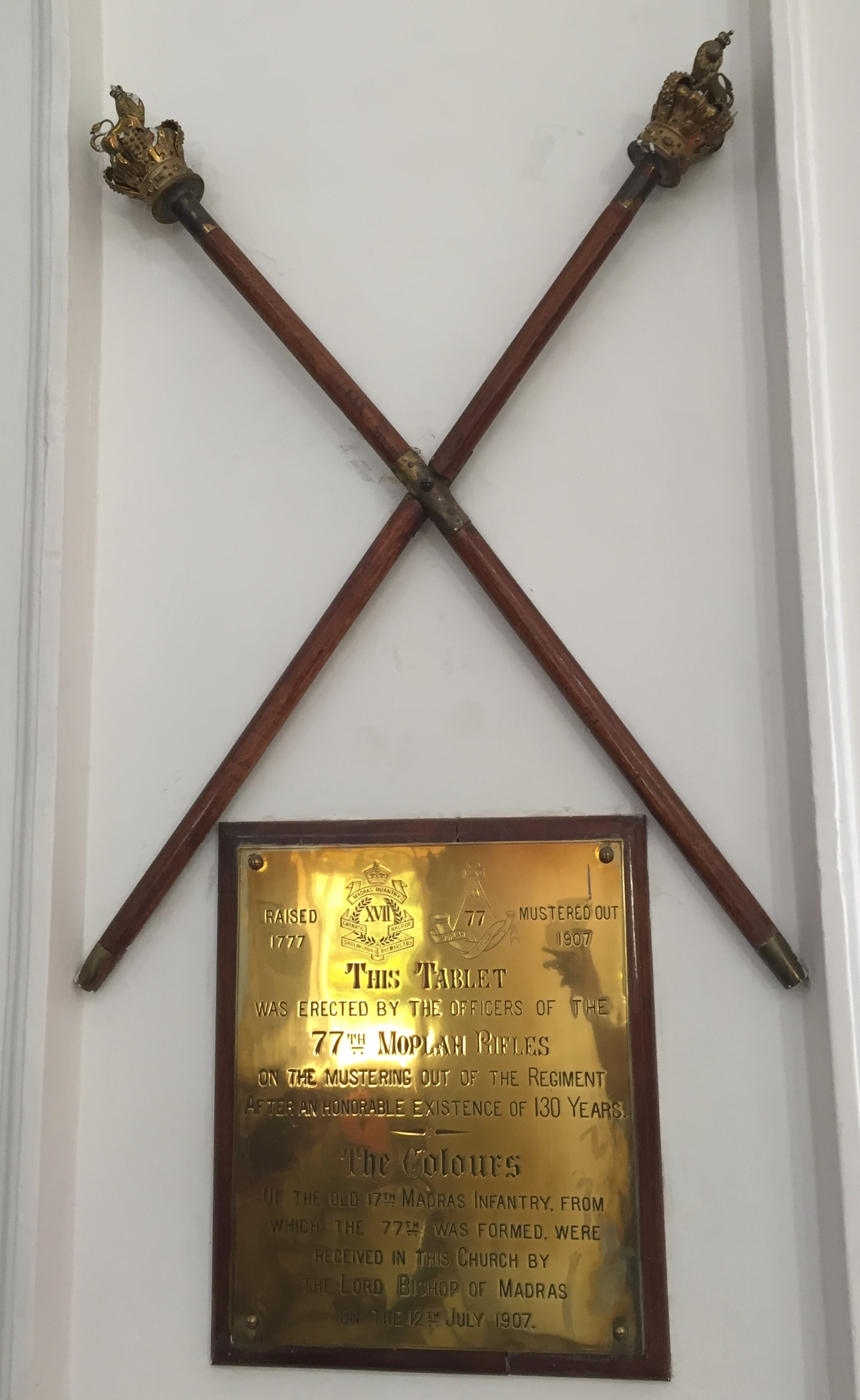
The Colours of the 77th Moplah Rifles with the Royal Mace at the St. Mark's Cathedral, Bangalore

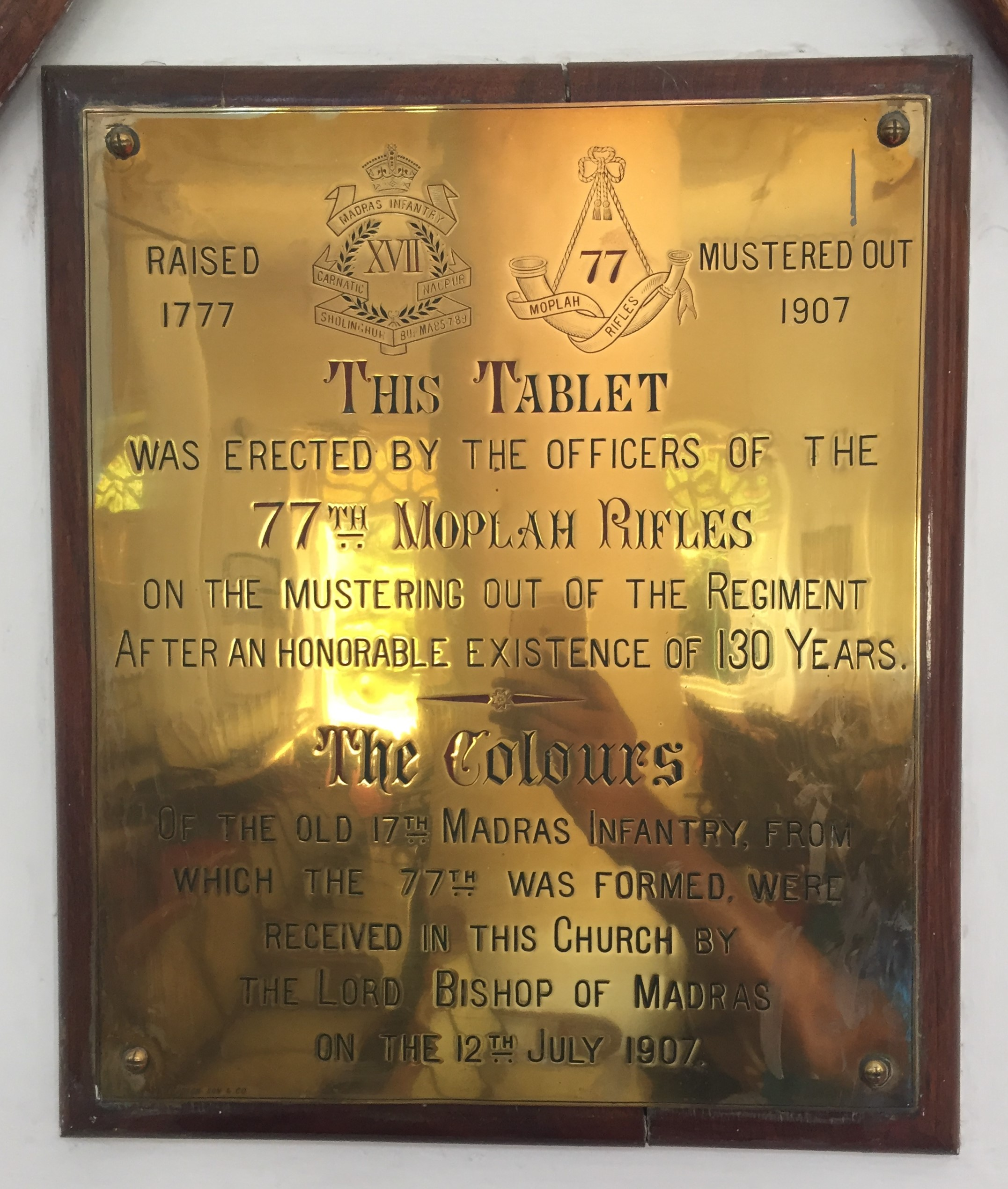
The Colours of the 77th Moplah Rifles at the St. Mark's Cathedral, Bangalore
