= Samuel Thomas Pettigrew =

Samuel Thomas Pettigrew (1827–1889) was an East India Company chaplain, who served in Rangoon, Kamptee, Bangalore, Ootacamund and Trivandrum, and is credited with establishing the Bishop Cotton's School and The Cathedral High School in Bangalore.

== Life in England ==
Samuel Thomas Pettigrew was born in 1827 in London to Elizabeth, née Reed, and Thomas Pettigrew, an eminent physician and antiquarian. He completed his graduation as a Bachelor of the Arts, from the Trinity College, Cambridge, in 1848, and proceeded Master of Arts in 1851. In 1848, he was ordained as a deacon by the Bishop of London, and as a priest in 1849. In 1853 he became a tutor and Fellow of St Augustine's College, Canterbury, and remained there till 1855. After serving a curacy for a short period at Westminster, he travelled to the East, where he served as chaplain of the Honourable East India Company, and was able to combine his priestly work and with his interest for natural history.

== Life in India ==
In 1855 he was appointed in the services of the East India Company, at Madras. In India he served at Rangoon (now Burma) (1855–57); Kamptee (1857–64); Bangalore (1864–67); Ootacamund (1869–72); Trevandrum (1874–77). Pettigrew was deeply interested in natural science, and was a keen botanist-entomologist, interested in the study of insects, birds, flowers, trees, architecture, church and school buildings, and Eurasian education.

== Bangalore, India ==
=== Bishop Cotton's Schools, Bangalore ===
In Bangalore, Pettigrew lived in a bungalow, called Sidney Park (present Kasturba Road) costing about £12 per month. Here, he made his plans on establishing schools and building churches in the Bangalore Civil and Military Station. His priority was schools, as those days most of the European and Eurasian children were being educated at Roman Catholic schools. The Government School at that time, was meant for the natives and did not encourage Eurasians to join, and other schools were far away in the Niligriris and at Madras. Hence, the Bishop Cotton's scheme of education for the hills was selected and a plan was made and forwarded to the Madras Government. Pettigrew was able to push for the inclusion of female students for the school, which had so far been resisted. His efforts were commentated with a mention in an Indian newspaper with the title The March of Female Education. The first 12 months of the school faced many difficulties and in this period, support came from General Hill and Captain Lavie, and the services of Rev Dr George Uglow Pope, Canadian Tamil scholar, were obtained.

=== St Paul's Church, Bangalore ===
Pettigrew describes the Church of England mission chapel as being nothing more than a plain and ugly building. An oblong structure having plastered walls, holes with wooden shutters for the windows. The interior was brick and mortar construction, 9 ft height serving as pulpit. A common table covered with an old red baize cloth was used as the altar. There were no seats, as the native population were used to sitting on the floor. A verandah which ran on the north and south sides of the chapel gave protection against the sun. A low mud wall served as the compound. At the entrance, existed a triangle which was used for punishing recalcitrant drummer, and in this triangle was the bell used for summoning the worshippers. A native deacon lived in a portion of the native schools, opposite to the church. The deacon received his stipend from the Venerable Society for the Propagation of the Gospel in Foreign Parts, and the school was being run by voluntary donations.

Pettigrew went through the records of the church and describes its history as being first planted by some German missionaries related to the Society for Promoting Christian Knowledge, in the 18th century. It was then transferred to the Society for the Propagation of the Gospel, and managed by a committee based in Madras. A spark of life was given to this church in 1817, when a chaplain brought together the scattered congregation. For the next 19 years, the worship was done in the small schoolroom with the sacraments being administered by the chaplain of the St Mark's Church in English, which was not understood by the Tamil natives. Under Canon Trevor of York, the mission was re-constituted with the church being rebuilt covered by subscription and funds provided by SPCK. Additional schools were also opened. On 31 March 1940, the church was consecrated as 'St Paul's Mission Church' for the purpose of native Christians. Later a missionary was appointed by SPG and a mission house constructed. In 1852, Bishop Dealtry gave licence for a native priest, but was shorty withdrawn.

In 1864, there was one native deacon, one catechist, a school master and a school mistress, the native congregation by that reaching 300. The Boys school attached to the church had 40 students, and the girls school 30 students, who were provided a daily meal and given clothes once a year with funds provided by a benevolent lady resident of the Cantonment.

=== All Saints' Church, Bangalore ===
S. T. Pettigrew was the driving force behind building the All Saints' Church, which stands on Hosur Road, Richmond Town, Bangalore. According to his records, the site of the church was initially allocated for a small colony of European pensioners, as the St Mark's Cathedral was getting full. A modest sum of INR 100 had been collected and a small plot had been allotted at the corner of the parade grounds. This initial plan was however rejected by the Church Building Society in Madras, as being too small, and a design drawn up Robert Chisholm, Consulting Architect, Madras Government was suggested as the alternate. After this Pettigrew left for the Nilgiris and returned after 2 years and found there was no progress in building the church. A decision was made to build the church with private contributions, with the estimated cost being INR 10,000. On 27 November 1869, the foundation stone was laid. The building project however faced much difficulties, financially and also otherwise. However, after the scaffolding, the community stepped up. Donations were made towards the altar, altar cross, vestments, font, pulpit, and communion plate. The Principal of Cooper's Hill College donated the rose window in memory of his child. The exterior of the building was completed for INR 2,000 lower than the original estimate. As, Bishop Waller was on sick leave in England, Bishop Milman who was visiting, consecrated the church on 17 October 1870. The services commenced under the chaplaincy of Rev Dr George Uglow Pope, who was then the warden of the Bishop Cotton's School.

== Retirement ==
On his return from India, he served as Curate-in-charge of Pudleston, 1878–80, and then as the Vicar of Hatfield, 1880–87. He died at Leominster in 1889.

== Books authored ==
S. T. Pettigrew, anonymously authored the book Episodes in the Life of an Indian Chaplain, where he describes his life as chaplain of the Honourable East India Company serving in India, at Rangoon, Kamptee, Bangalore, Ootacamund and Trevandrum.
