= Cathedral High School, Bengaluru =

Coordinates: 12.9667°N 77.6078°E

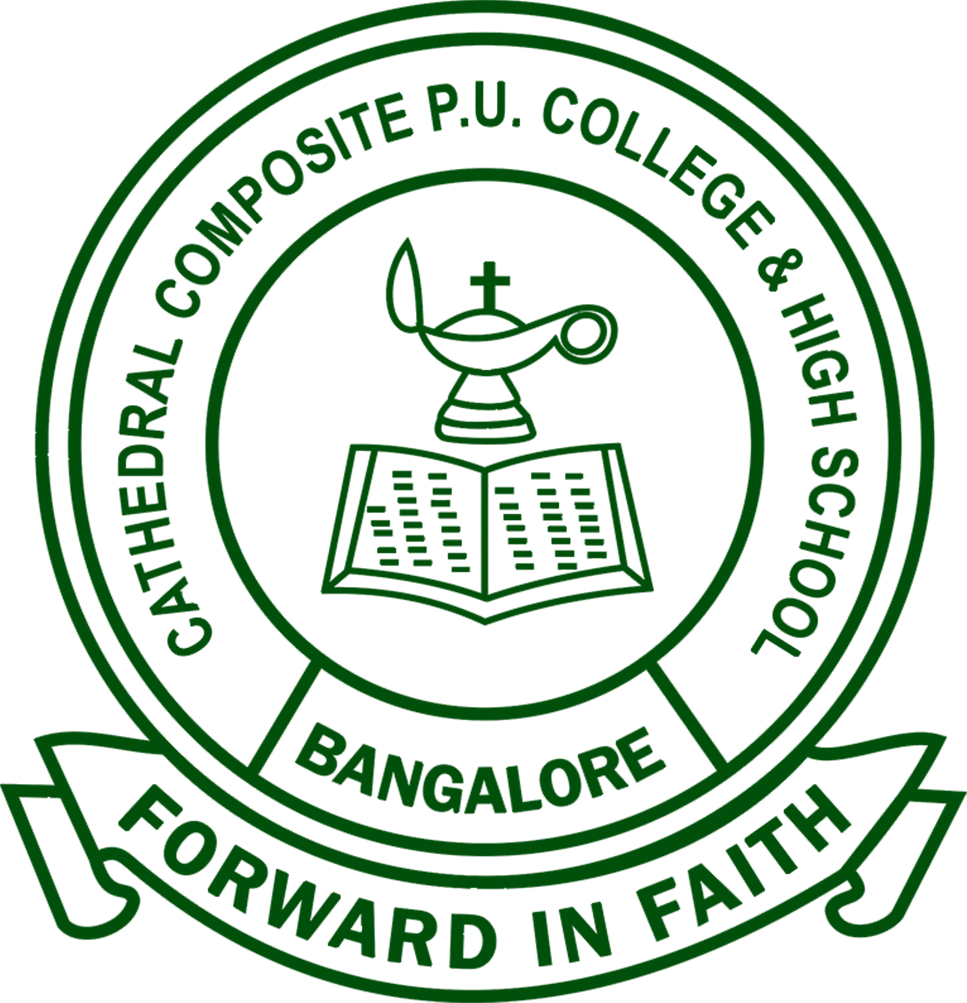

Information
- Type: Private School & Junior College
- Motto: Forward in Faith
- Established: 1866; 160 years ago
- Founder: Samuel Thomas Pettigrew
- Principal: Dr. D. Alwin Rajan
- Grades: Cathedral High School: Nursery - Class 10th CISCE Cathedral PU College: Class 11th and 12th KSEAB
- Houses: Pettigrew; Richmond; Courpalais; Stracey; Whistance
- Color
- Publication: The Cathedralite
- Website: Official website

The Cathedral High School in Bangalore, Karnataka is a co-educational institute affiliated to the Council for the Indian School Certificate Examinations (CISCE). It forms a part of Institutions in the city that are run by the Church of South India under Karnataka Central Diocese. It was established at 1866 and is one of the oldest educational institutions in State being over 160 years since establishment. It is located in Central Business District of the city on Richmond road. The Institution is located on one 14-acre (57,000 m^{2}) campus, it shares the block with CSI-KCD All Saints Church. It also houses the Cathedral Pre-university College in the same campus and it is affiliated to the Karnataka School Examination and Assessment Board (KSEAB).
