= 78th Moplah Rifles =

- Active: 1794-1907
- Country: Indian Empire
- Branch: Army
- Type: Infantry
- Part of: Madras Army (to 1895); Madras Command
- Colors: Red; faced dark green, 1882 green, 1898 emerald green 1904 Red; faced green. From 1902 red fezzes replaced turbans.
- Engagements: Third Burmese War

The 78th Moplah Rifles was an infantry regiment of the British Indian Army. The regiment's origin could be traced to 1794, when it was raised as the 35th Madras Battalion. At the beginning of the 20th century the basis for recruitment was changed from Madrasis to Moplahs - who are Muslims of Arab origin located along the coast of Malabar. The Moplahs had a reputation as an aggressive race and it was hoped to make use of their martial skills in the Indian Army. A problem from the beginning was that the population numbers available for recruitment were limited. In 1907, shortly before disbandment, the regiment numbered only 350 men.

Two battalion-sized regiments of Moplah Rifles were accordingly raised (the 77th and 78th MR) and the second of these was posted to the North West Frontier in 1905 to be tested under active-service conditions. The experiment was not considered as being a success. In part this was because of difficulties experienced by British officers in learning the Moplah language, which did not include any military terms. Another problem reported was that the Moplah sepoys, acclimatized to the moist humidity of southern India, suffered severely from the dry climate of the Punjab frontier.

In the year that the Moplahs became the 2nd Moplah Rifles (1902), a detachment was shipped to England for the Coronation of King Edward VII and Queen Alexandra. They attracted attention, in part because of their scarlet zouave jackets and red tarbushes - a headdress not previously worn by the Indian Army.

The last two annual reports on the Moplah Rifles were negative, stating that 'fanaticism' amongst the sepoys made these units unsuitable for garrison duties in Madras. In view of the problems faced by the 78th MR when posted to the North-West Frontier Province, service with the field army was not considered a feasible alternative. The two regiments accordingly were included in Lord Kitchener's reductions of 'generally inefficient' Madras regiments and were disbanded in 1907.

== Predecessor names ==
- 35th Madras Battalion - 1794
- 25th Madras Infantry - 1861
- 2nd Moplah Rifles - 1902
- 78th Moplah Rifles - 1903 (same recruiting basis as the 77th Moplah Rifles)
