= John Taunton =

English surgeon

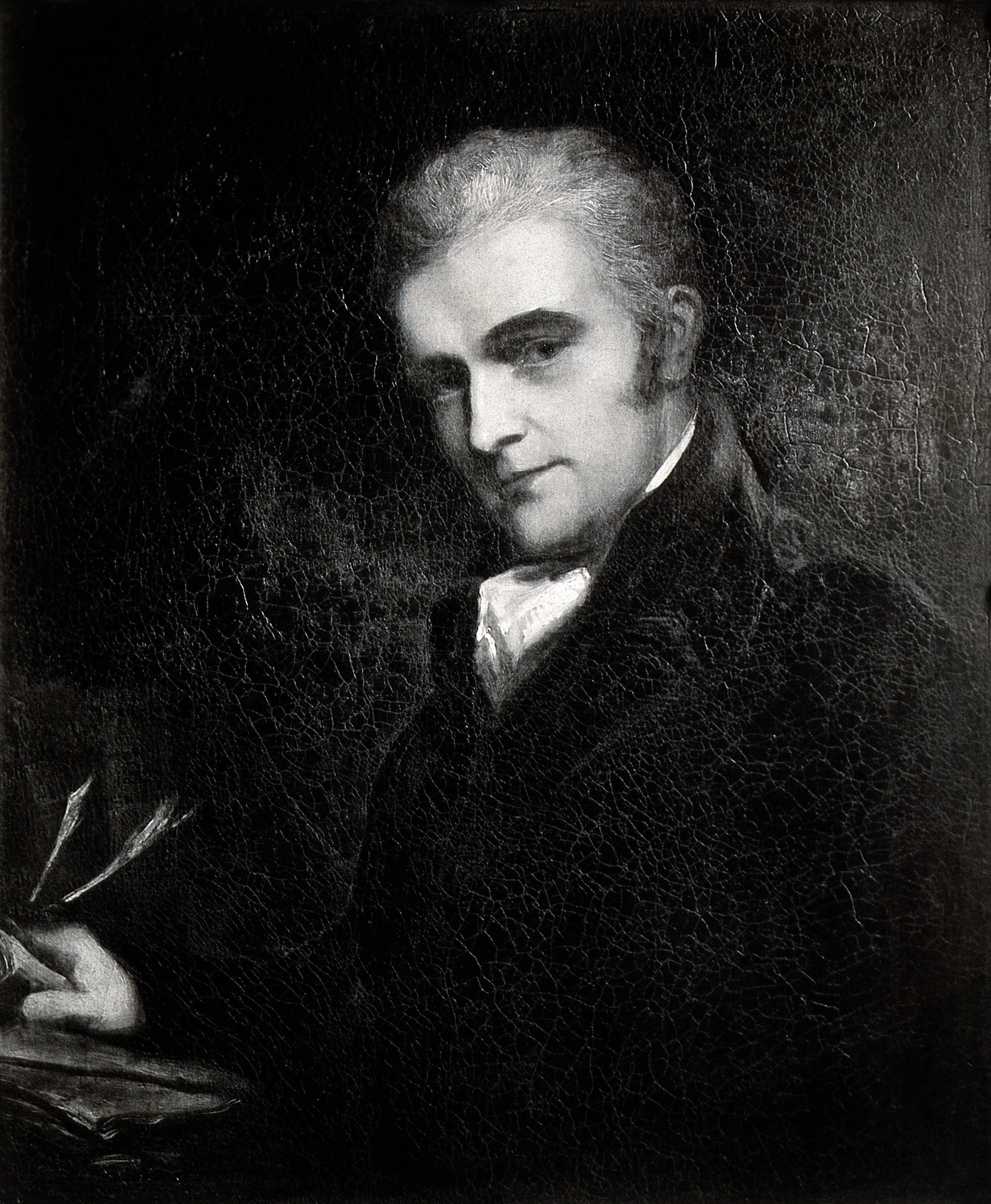
- Born: 1769; Paxford, Blockley, Worcestershire
- Died: 5 March 1821 (aged 51–52)
- Occupation: Surgeon

John Taunton (1769 – 5 March 1821) was an English surgeon.

== Biography ==
Taunton was the son of Charles Taunton. He was born at Pye Mill in Paxford, a hamlet of Blockley in Worcestershire. He was baptised on 21 May 1769 in the parish church of Chipping Campden, and was brought up as a farmer; but a study of anatomy drew him to London. He knew nobody there, and, asking at a shop in Holborn for the most reputed surgeon and best anatomical instructor, was directed to Dr. Andrew Marshal of Thavies Inn. He immediately waited upon him, but did not attend his classes, and he eventually became a pupil of Henry Cline at St. Thomas's Hospital. This was about 1798. In 1801 Taunton was appointed demonstrator of anatomy at Guy's Hospital, in temporary charge during the illness of John Cunningham Saunders, and he subsequently became principal lecturer at the London Anatomical Society. He was surgeon to the city dispensary in 1801, at a time when the charity was almost bankrupt; but under his able guidance it soon became a flourishing establishment. His position as surgeon to the city dispensary led him to treat large numbers of poor weavers in Spitalfields who suffered from prolapsus ani, hernia, and other diseases incident to their occupation, for the cure of which expensive mechanical appliances were required. This led to the establishment of the City of London Truss Society in 1807, when Taunton, with the assistance of a young bell-hanger, began to manufacture trusses for distribution among the poor of the neighbourhood. Taunton became attached to the Finsbury dispensary as its surgeon about the beginning of the century, and reformed its whole constitution. He also took an active part at the Medical Society of London, which he nearly wrecked in 1812 by proposing as secretary, and carrying against all opposition, Thomas Joseph Pettigrew, a former apprentice, then newly admitted a member of the Royal College of Surgeons, instead of Dr. George Birkbeck, whose position as a senior member of the profession should have secured him from such a contest. Taunton had a very large dispensary practice of a kind which is now extinct. It was his duty to visit the sick poor at their own homes, which were distributed over large areas. He performed this duty most conscientiously, yet he found time to carry out innumerable post-mortem examinations and made many pathological preparations. He also established a private school, at which he sought to supplement the very deficient training then given to the medical students at the various hospitals in London. He died at his house in Hatton Garden on Monday morning, 5 March 1821, leaving a widow and three sons.

An unsigned three-quarter length portrait in oils of John Taunton was placed in the secretary's office at the Truss Society's rooms in Finsbury Square, E.C.
