= St. Paul's Church, Bengaluru =

St. Paul's Church
- Mission Church of St. Paul
- St. Paul's Church
- 12°58′18″N 77°35′40″E
- Location: Bangalore
- Country: India
- Denomination: Church of South India
- Tradition: Anglican
- Website: www.stpaulschurchspg.yolasite.com

History
- Consecrated: 1840

Architecture
- Style: English Baroque
- Groundbreaking: August 1839
- Completed: March 1840
- Construction cost: BINR 1250

Administration
- Diocese: Karnataka Central Diocese

St. Paul's Church is located in the corner of Old Poor House Road, and Bowring Hospital Road, next to the Bowring and Lady Curzon Hospital, Bangalore Cantonment, India. St. Paul's has the distinction of being the very first Tamil Anglican Church in the erstwhile Mysore State. St. Paul's celebrated its 175th anniversary in May 2014. Like most old churches of Bangalore, the congregation of St. Paul's is spread all across Bangalore.

== History ==
Rev. George Trevor (1809-1859), Chaplin, East India Company, re-established the Church of England Bangalore Tamil Mission, which was originally found by Rev. William Thomas in the early 19th century. Rev. Trevor, supervised a schoolmaster and a Catechist of the Tamil mission. The native Tamil congregation worshipped at the St. Mark's Church, with the Tamil services being conducted by the Catechist. The christening and the baptisms of the Tamil converts were also recorded in the registers of St. Mark's. Rev. Trevor, took an active part in missionary work, in spite of his heavy civil and military duties as Chaplin of the East India Company in Bangalore, with him personally baptising many new native converts. However, the Government of Madras, raised objections of the use of the registers of St. Mark's (which was a then a Company church), as it gave the impression that the Government was involved in converting the natives. Rev. Trevor then contacted Sir. Mark Cubbon, the then Chief Commissioner of Mysore, and was able to obtain a site in the Bangalore Civil and Military Station for a church and school for the native Tamil congregation, and raised funds to build the same.

There existed a St. Paul’s Tamil Medium Primary School at the present site of the Church, since 1835, till it was closed down in 1900. The Native Tamil Anglicans (mainly converted "sepoys" or soldiers of the Madras Army), wanted a Tamil Anglican church for worship in their native language. The clergy of the St. Mark's Church helped in establishing the St. Paul's Church, the first Tamil Anglican church in Mysore State. Rev. George Trevor, Chaplin, East India Company, raised a local subscription towards building the church, while the Church of England also contributed £50 towards its construction. The church was built in the compound of the St. Paul’s Tamil Medium Primary School. The 180-year-old school building has now been renovated and serves as the community parish hall.

According to Rev. A Westcott, as recorded in his book 'Our Oldest Indian Mission: A Brief History of the Vepery (Madras) Mission', Rev. G Trevor, the Company Chaplain helped raise funds for building the Tamil Church. Bishop Spencer laid the foundation in August 1839. The church was completed at a cost of BINR 1250 and consecrated in March 1840 as 'The Mission Church of St. Paul.' The act of consecration specifically states that the Church is dedicated for Divine Services in the Tamil languages only. At this time there were around 132 Christian families attached to the Bangalore Mission.

Missionaries, the elders and the congregation of St. Mark's Church identified a suitable place for building a separate church for the Tamil Anglican community, in 1838. Works commenced in the same year, under the guidance of Rev. George Trevor. The church was consecrated on 31 March 1840 by the Lord Bishop of Madras, the Rev. George Trevor Spencer, with Rev. S. J. Joshua (SPG) as its first parish priest.

Both St. Mark's Church and St. Paul's Church were supported by the Society for the Propagation of the Gospel in Foreign Parts (SPG).

== SPG Records ==
Bangalore was a town having a 60,000 population, and prior to 1837 there was only a native catechist who looked after the needs of the local native christian population, and also ran a school for about a dozen children. The catechist read the church services in the school house located in the Bangalore Cantonment for about 30-40 natives.

Rev. G Treveor took charge of the mission on 1838 and started a subscription for building a church and maintaining a church. By 1844, the number of children in the schools has increased to 180, with 20-40 females, and the number of schools for natives in the Cantonment were three.

The Bishop laid the foundation for the church on 5 August 1839, and was completed in 6 months, to be consecrated on 31 March 1840, as the 'Mission Church of St. Paul'. The consecration act particularly mentions that the church was dedicated for device services in the Tamil language only. The church services in Tamil commenced on Sunday 5 April 1840. Everyday morning prayers were held at 7:30AM, and full services with sermon on Sundays at 10:30AM and 4:30PM. Rev. Trevor visited the church for administering the Lord's Supper and the Sacraments of Baptism.

The Total cost for building the church was about £125 (BINR 1250.14), and £89.8 for the school room in the churchyard. On the day of the consecration, about BINR 354 was still owing with Rev. Treveor taking responsibility for the debt (else the consecration would have been delayed). The debt was settled in full the next day by a donation by a friend of Rev. Trevor, who wished to remain anonymous.

After the church opened, around 80 people attended services on Sundays, and about 50 during weekdays. On occasions such as Christmas and Easter around 150 people attended, even though the church was designed to accommodate 200 people. By 1844, around 333 people (76 men, 128 women, and 129 children) had been baptised by the church. A native catechist, three readers, two school masters and a school mistresses were employed and maintained by local subscriptions, and were supervised by Mr. Bayly. Rev. J Bilderbeck a missionary preached once in the church and examined the schools.

By 1844, there were around 132 families in the congregation, and the school has 111 scholars (64 christian, and 47 non-christian), with average daily attendance of 95, and about 40 being able to read.

== Pettigrew's Records, 1864 ==
S T Pettigrew describes the Church of England mission chapel as being nothing more than a plain and ugly building. An oblong structure having plastered walls, holes with wooden shutters for the windows. The interior was brick and mortar construction, 9 ft height serving as pulpit. A common table covered with an old red baize cloth was used as the altar. There were no seats, as the native population were used to sitting on the floor. A verandah which ran on the north and south sides of the chapel gave protection against the sun. A low mud wall served as the compound. At the entrance, existed a triangle which was used for punishing recalcitrant drummer, and in this triangle was the bell used for summoning the worshippers. A native deacon lived in a portion of the native schools, opposite to the church. The deacon received his stipend from the Venerable Society for the Propagation of the Gospel in Foreign Parts, and the school was being run by voluntary donations.

=== History ===
Pettigrew went through the records of the church and describes its history. The church has its roots in the 18th century, being first planted by some German missionaries related to the Society for Promoting Christian Knowledge. It was then transferred to the Society for the Propagation of the Gospel, and managed by a committee based in Madras. A spark of life was given to this church in 1817, when a chaplain brought together the scattered congregation. For the next 19 years, the worship was done in the small schoolroom with the sacraments being administered by the chaplain of the St. Mark;s Church in English, which was not understood by the Tamil natives. Under Canon Trevor of York, the mission was re-constituted with the church being rebuilt covered by subscription and funds provided by SPCK. Additional schools were also opened. On 31 March 1940, he church was consecrated as 'St. Paul's Mission Church' for the purpose of native Christians. Later a missionary was appointed by SPG and a mission house constructed. In 1852, Bishop Dealtry gave licence for a native priest, but was shorty withdrawn.

In 1864, there was one native deacon, one catechist, a school master and a school mistress, the native congregation by that reaching 300. The Boys school attached to the church had 40 students, and the girls school 30 students, who were provided a daily meal and given clothes once a year with funds provided by a benevolent lady resident of the Cantonment.

== Renovations ==
A record of an alteration to St. Paul's has been recorded in 1865. Samuel Thomas Pettigrew, Station Chaplain of the East India Company stationed at the Bangalore Civil and Military Station extended, altered and improved the St. Paul's Tamil SPG Church. Before that it is recorded as being ugly and small. S T Pettigrew also founded the All Saints Church, on Hosur Road, Richmond Town in 1870, and served as the chaplain of the St Mark’s Cathedral from 1863 to 1867 and 1869 to 1872.

Other that the above, the church building has been altered and extended at least four times (as recorded), in 1901, 1936, 1947 and recently in 2007.

=== 1901 - Eastern side ===
Below the baptismal altar in the church, there is a stone, dated 7 March 1901, AD, which marks the extension of the Eastern side of the church, acknowledging the benevolence of Mr. Joseph David, this being the first recorded extension of the church.

=== 1936 - Western side ===
In 1936, the western side of the church was extended, with the foundation being laid by Rev. Canon H. H. Flynn on 13 April 1936, and the completed church re-dedicated by the Rt. Rev. E. H. M. Waller, DD, Lord Bishop of Madras, on 11 October 1936. This now houses the vestry and choir room. The tablets for this second recorded extension are on the side of the church facing the setting sun.

=== 1947 - Southern side ===
In 1947, Rt. Rev. Pakenaham laid the foundation for the extension on the Southern side, for housing the holy sanctuary and chancel. A brass tablet located beside the arch of the sanctuary acknowledges this event. Funds were raised by the Mother's Union. The consecration of the altar sanctuary was performed by Rt. Rev. P Gurushantha, Bishop, Mysore Diocese. A circular cross embedded silver plate acknowledges this event, this being the third extension of the church.

== 175th anniversary ==
The church celebrated its 175 years of existence in May 2014. The celebrations were led by Rt. Rev. Y William, retired bishop of the CSI Vellore Diocese. An eternal lamp was lit, using the flame brought from the St. Mark's Cathedral, the mother church of St. Paul's.

On 19 April 2015, a special commemorative Post Cover was released by India Post (Special Cover approval no. KTK/38/2015) to mark 175 years of St. Paul's Church. The Postal cover was released by Rt. Rev. Dr. Prasanna Kumar Samuel, Rev. D John Milton and S Shivaram, Senior Superintendent of Post Offices on the occasion of the celebration of Septaquintaquinque centennial celebrations service at the church.

== Community services ==
The church is located right next to the Bowring and Lady Curzon Hospital. The church was established 20 years before the hospital was built. Being, next to the hospital, the church offers solace to people of all religions and communities who drop in to offer prayers for their loved ones who are admitted to the hospital.

== Dateline ==
- Late 1700s, Bangalore Tamil mission set up by German missionaries of the Society for Promoting Christian Knowledge
- 1817 scattered congregation brought together, and the next 19 years, the worship was done in the small schoolroom with sacraments being administered by the chaplain of the St. Mark's Church
- 1835 Location for building the St. Paul's Church identified by the Missionary, the Elders and the Congregation of St. Mark’s Church (SPG)
- 1838 Rev. George Trevor, Chaplin, East India Company, helps establish St. Paul's Church, the first Anglican Tamil Church in the Mysore State
- 1840 March 31 St. Paul's Church consecrated by The Lord Bishop of Madras the Rev. George Trevor Spencer, with Rev. S J Joshua (SPG) as the first parish priest
- 1865 Church building renovations and additions by S T Pettigrew
- 1901 First extension on the eastern side
- 1936 Second extension on the western side
- 1940 Centenary celebrations, under the presbytership of Rev. R Ezekiel, and Hon. Secretary G S Samuel
- 1947 Third extension on the southern side
- 1965 125 years celebrations under the presbytership of Rev. Paramamandam
- 1989 March 31 150 years celebrations, under the presbytership of Rev. Solomon Gnanaraj and Rev. Saduri
- 2014 175 years celebrations, led by Rt. Rev. Y William, retired bishop of the CSI Vellore Diocese.
- 2015 April 19, special commemorative cover released by India Post to mark 175 years of St. Paul's

== List of presbyters (till 2021) ==
- Rev. S J Joshua (1840-
- Rev. D Savarimuthu (1852 - 1858)
- Rev. S A Godfrey (1858 – 1861)
- Rev. I Eleazer (1861 - 1870)
- Rev. G Lazarus (1870 – 1882)
- Rev. I Ignatius (1882 – 1886)
- Rev. Thomas Duraisingh (1886 - 1888)
- Rev. Cornelius (1888 - 1894)
- Rev. M D Israel (1894 - 1896)
- Rev. S Paranjothi (1896 – 1925)
- Rev. M Yesudian (1925 - 1926)
- Rev. James Barnabas (1926 - 1929)
- Rev. Koilpillai (1929 – 1933)
- Rev. Gnanaiyah Yesudian Tucker (1933 – 1937)
- Rev. Daniel Jacob (Deacon)
- Rev. R Ezekiel (1937 - 1945)
- Rev. A S Lokapathy (1945 - 1957)
- Rev. E S Paramanandam (1957 - 1968)
- Rev. M P Henry (Deacon)
- Rev. G J R Athistham (1968 – 1971)
- Rev. Y David (1971 – 1972)
- Rev. M K Arnold (1972 – 1975)
- Rev. G J R Athistham (1976 – 1983)
- Rev. James Williams (1983)
- Rev. D M Bhaskaran (1983 - 1987)
- Rev. J Saduri (1987 – 1990)
- Rev. D Victor Thomas (1990 - 1995)
- Rev. Moses Jayakumar (1995 - 1997)
- Rev. J Saduri (1997 - 2001)
- Rev. J A Victor Joshua (2001 – 2003)
- Rev. A Jeganathan (2003 – 2008)
- Rev. D Victor Thomas (2008 – 2011)
- Rev. D John Milton (2011 – 2016)
- Rev. J. Soundar Rajan (2016 - 2021)
- Rev. Christy Gnanadasan (2021 - )
