= Sudi Devanesen =

Canadian physician

Sudarshan Devanesen CM
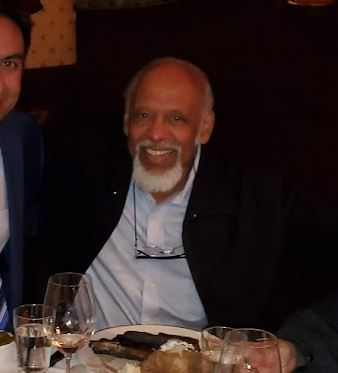
- Citizenship: Canadian
- Education: Bishop Cotton Boys' School, Madras Christian College, Christian Medical College
- Occupations: Associate Professor University of Toronto, Toronto, Canada; Chairman of the Department of Family Medicine, St Michael Hospital Toronto
- Relatives: Dr Dayalan Devanesen; Leslie Goonewardene (uncle)

Sudarshan (Sudi) Devanesen, CM, is a Canadian family medicine physician and educator, public health activist, and member of the Order of Canada. He is known for his role in preventing heart disease in Canadian South Asians.

Devanesen was founding president (1994–1997) of a South Asian Community Council of the Heart and Stroke Foundation of Ontario, and has both studied and educated on the risks of cardiovascular disease in the South Asian community in Canada.

== Early life and education ==
Devanesen is of Sri Lankan-Indian descent, born in Sri Lanka to a Sinhalese mother, and Tamil father. Devanesen's father, Chandran Devanesen, was the first Indian Principal of Madras Christian College while his mother, Savithri (Norma Amybelle) was a sister of Leslie Goonewardene, who founded Sri-Lanka's first political party, the Lanka Sama Samaja Party, and played an instrumental role in both the Indian independence movement and the Sri Lankan independence movement.

Devanesen studied at Bishop Cotton Boys' School in Bangalore, Madras Christian College of the University of Madras, and the Christian Medical College in Vellore, all in India.

== Career ==
Devanesen began his medical practice in remote villages in Tamil Nadu and Rajasthan.

In 1972, he immigrated to Canada. After briefly training at Janeway Children's Hospital at Memorial University of Newfoundland in St. John's, Newfoundland, he moved to Toronto He joined the Post Graduate programme in Family Medicine at St Michael's Hospital. He began study at St. Michael's Hospital and the Faculty of Medicine of the University of Toronto in 1973; he would eventually become chief of family and community medicine at St. Michael's Hospital from 1988 to 1998 and is today an associate professor at the University of Toronto. He was medical director of the Broadview Community Health Clinic from 1980 to 1989. He also served as physician for the Fred Victor Centre, a downtown Toronto mission serving the homeless, and on the board of directors of Casey House, a hospice serving HIV/AIDS patients.

He earned his Master of Clinical Science degree from the University of Western Ontario in 1990, and is a Fellow of the College of Family Physicians of Canada.

== Medical beliefs ==
An advocate of holistic medicine, Devanesen's practice integrates the medical and biopsychosocial models of health care. Particularly concerned with prevention of disease and interested in cardiovascular disease, he became founding president (1994–1997) of a South Asian Community Council of the Heart and Stroke Foundation of Ontario, and has studied and educated the Canadian Community on the risks of cardiovascular disease amongst the South Asians.

== Personal life ==
Devanesen was appointed Member of the Order of Canada on 30 May 2001, and invested with the honour on 4 December 2001. His citation into the Order called him "a positive role model and mentor to hundreds of medical residents, family physicians and nurse practitioners."

Devanesen practices family medicine in Mississauga since 1999. He practiced alongside his wife, Dr Asha Devanesen, Emeritus from the College of Physician and Surgeons of Ontario.
