= Lavelle (surname) =

Lavelle is a surname. Notable people with this surname include:

- Caroline Lavelle (b. 1969), British singer-songwriter and cellist
- Gary Lavelle (b. 1949), American baseball player
- George Lavelle (b. 2000), English cricketer
- Helen Laird (1874–1957), Irish actress also known as ‘Honor Lavelle’
- James Lavelle (b. 1974), British DJ
- John W. Lavelle (1949–2007), American politician
- John D. Lavelle (1916–1979), American general
- Louis Lavelle (1883–1951), French philosopher
- Matt Lavelle, (b. 1970), American musician
- Michael Lavelle, Irish soldier, settler in India
- Patrick Lavelle, Irish priest and nationalist
- Peter Lavelle (born 1961), American TV host
- Rebecca Lavelle (born 1980), Australian singer
- Rita Lavelle (born 1947), American politician
- Rosanna Lavelle (b. 1979), British actress
- Rose Lavelle (b. 1995), American football player
- Samuel Lavelle (b. 1996), British footballer
- Sheila Lavelle (1939-2001), English children's writer

== See also ==
- Ó Maol Fábhail, an Irish surname anglicized to "Lavelle"
