= Apparanda Aiyappa =

British Indian Army officer in World War II (1913–1983)

Lieutenant General Apparanda Chengappa Aiyappa MBE
- Born: 2 September 1913; Kodagu, British India
- Died: 1983 (aged 69–70)
- Military career
- Allegiance: India; British India
- Branch: Indian Army; British Indian Army
- Rank: Lieutenant General
- Unit: Indian Army Corps of Signals
- Conflicts: World War II
- Other work: Chief of Bharat Electronics Limited

Lieutenant General Apparanda Chengappa Aiyappa, MBE (2 September 1913 – 1983), better known as A. C. Iyappa was an Indian Army officer and decorated World War II veteran. He was the first Indian Signal officer in chief (Head of the Indian Army Corps of Signals). Iyappa was also the first chief of the Bharat Electronics Limited (BEL).

== Early years of Iyappa ==
Iyappa was born on 2 September 1913 during the British Raj, into the wealthy and influential Apparanda family which belonged to the Kodava community of Kodagu. He studied at Bishop Cotton Boys' School Bangalore, and later at Stamford School, Lincolnshire in England. After college, he went on to join the Indian Military Academy, and from there got an Admission into the British Indian Army.

== Brief history of Signals in India ==
When the post World War I re-organization of the Indian Army was carried out, the Indian Signals Corps was formed as a separate corps on 17 April 1920.

== Military career ==
On 7 July 1935 he was commissioned from Indian Military Academy on to the Indian Land Forces, Special List and on 12 August 1935 he was attached to the 1st battalion 7th Rajput Regiment and the Indian Signal Corps. He was promoted Lieutenant, Indian Land Forces, Special List on 2 December 1936. He was appointed to the Indian Army 23 November 1937. In early 1939 he was permanently appointed to the Indian Signal Corps.

== Bharat Electronics Limited ==
Bharat Electronics Limited (BEL) was set up at Bangalore, by the Government of India under the Ministry of Defence in 1954 to meet the specialised electronic needs of the Indian Defence Services. Over the years, it has grown into a multi-product, multi-technology, multi-unit company serving the needs of customers in diverse fields in India and abroad. BEL is among an elite group of public sector undertakings which have been conferred the Navratna status by the Government of India. When it was first set up, the Government of India made Iyappa its first chairman; he remained in this position for 18 years.

== Death and legacy ==
Iyappa was married to Sita Achaya. Iyappa died from cancer in 1983, and his wife died in 1993.

Today there is a park named after him (General Iyappa Park), near BEL circle in Bangalore.
