= Philip Wollen =

Australian philanthropist, environmentalist and animal rights activist

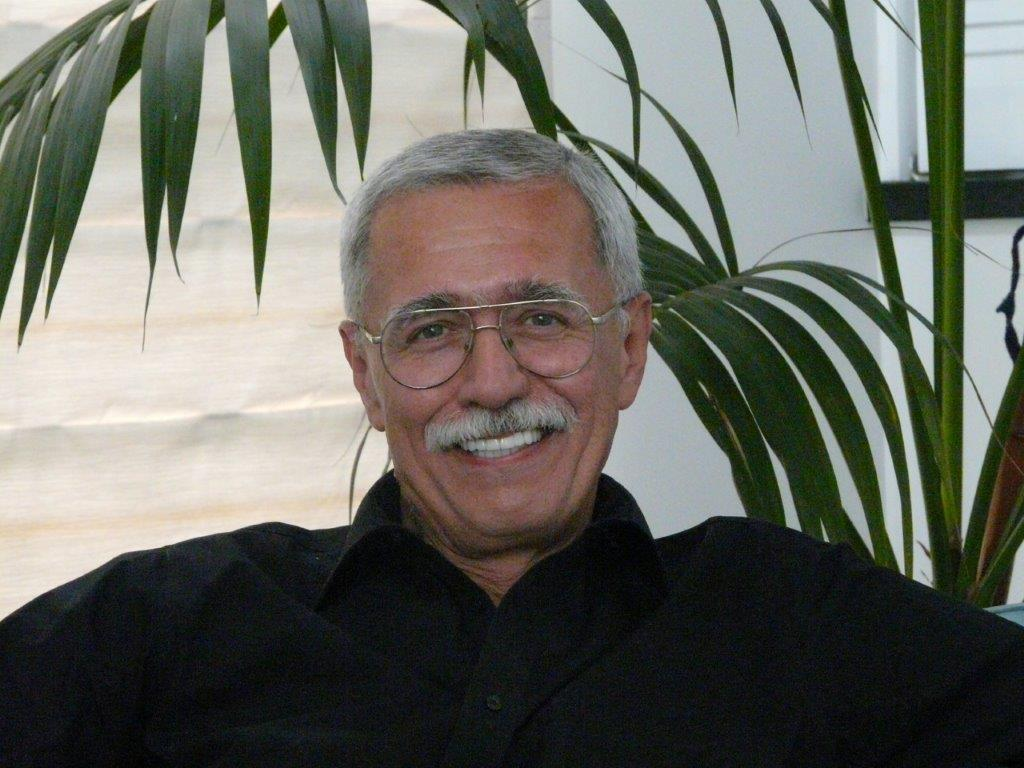
- Born: 1950 (age 75–76); Bangalore, India
- Education: Bishop Cotton Boys School, Bordertown High School, Adelaide University
- Alma mater: Adelaide University
- Known for: Australian philanthropist, Animal rights activist
- Spouse: Trix Wollen
- Website: Winsome Constance Kindness Trust

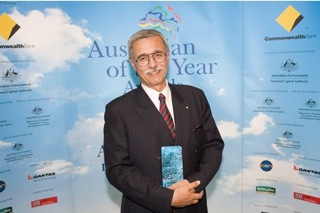
Australian of the Year (Victoria) – 2007

Philip Wollen OAM (born 1950) is an Australian philanthropist, environmentalist, animal rights activist, and public speaker. He is a former vice-president of Citibank and general manager at Citicorp.

== Education and career ==
Wollen attended the Bishop Cotton Boys' School in Bangalore and later delivered the General Thimayya Memorial Lecture in Bangalore, India, in 2008. He resides in Melbourne, Victoria, with his wife Trix.

Wollen supports projects related to children, animals, the environment, palliative care, and youth development. In 2005, he received the Medal of the Order of Australia. In 2007, he was named Australian of the Year (Victoria). The National Australia Day Council described him as "essentially a private man" who is "not afraid to step into the limelight for a just cause."

== Support for Healthcare and Research ==
Wollen provides financial support for various health initiatives, including research, medical equipment, and healthcare services. His contributions have supported efforts related to cancer, stroke, neurology, road trauma, and general health, particularly through promoting diet and exercise.

=== Healthcare Institutions Supported ===
- Peter MacCallum Cancer Hospital
- Cabrini Health
- Snowdome Foundation

=== Advocacy for Health and Well-being ===
Wollen follows a vegan lifestyle and promotes plant-based diets as part of a holistic approach to health. He advocates for general well-being and public awareness regarding the health benefits associated with veganism.

== Patron and board memberships ==
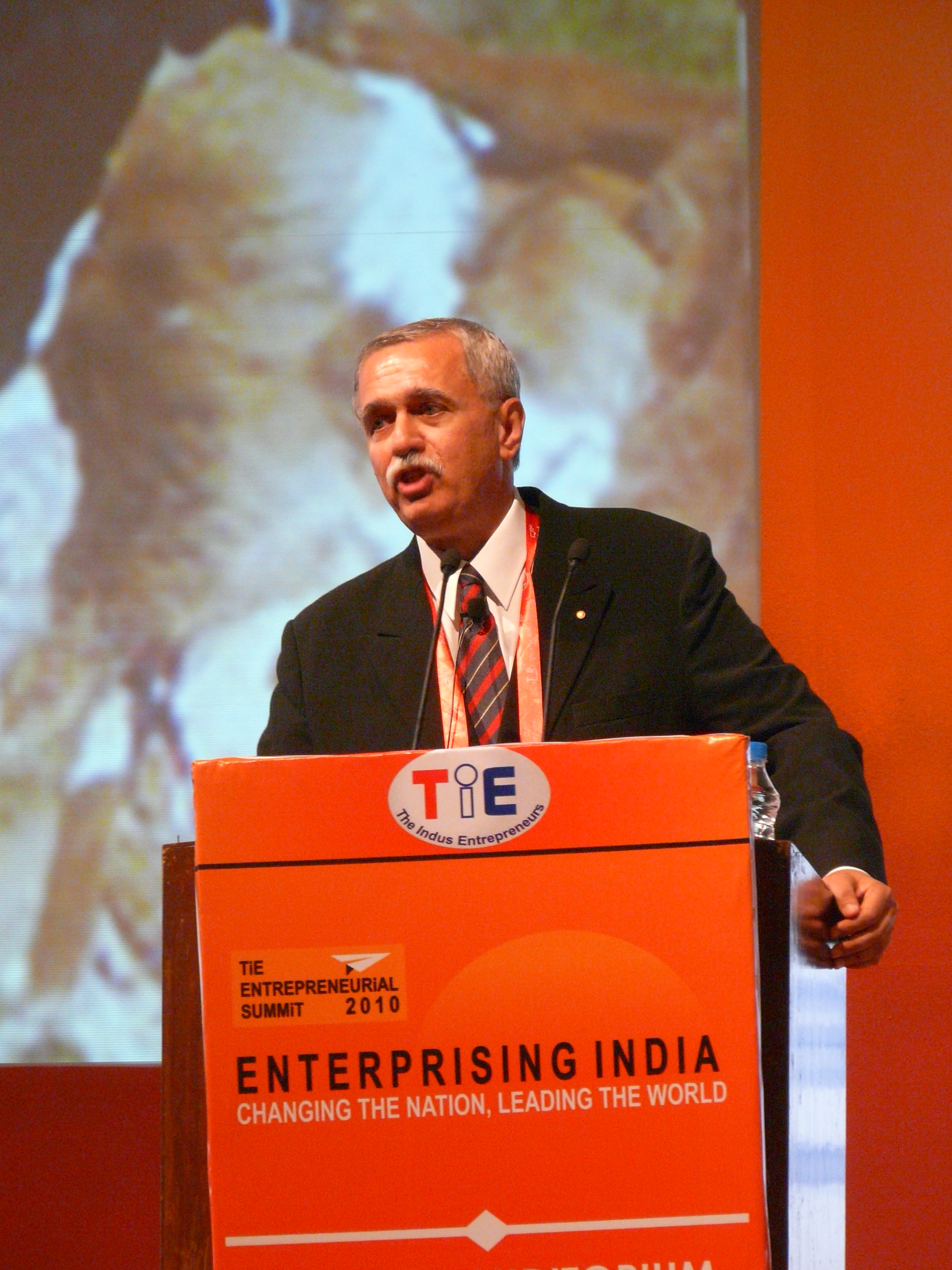
Philip Wollen in 2010

Since 2010, he has served as a Board Member of Akashinga Zimbabwe. Wollen also holds patronage for several organizations, including Blue Cross of India and Dandenong Ranges Emergency Relief Services. Additionally, he supports Lambcare Australia, an organization dedicated to rescuing and rehabilitating lambs, and the Monkey Helpline, which works to protect and rehabilitate monkeys in South Africa. He is also a patron of World Animal Voice. Wollen has been a prominent advocate for veganism, serving as a patron of World Vegan Day.

== Winsome Constance Kindness ==
Wollen's primary initiative, Winsome Constance Kindness, is a global project with the mission "to promote kindness towards all other living beings and enshrine it as a recognisable trait in the Australian character and culture."

As of 2024, it had supported 850 initiatives in 54 countries.

== Kindness House ==
Kindness House, based in the Melbourne suburb of Fitzroy, served as an "incubator" for non-governmental organisations, providing rent-free or subsidised office space to groups involved in activism and advocacy.

== Awards ==
Year	Award	Refs.
2005	The Queen's Birthday 2005 Honours List	
2007	National Australia Day Council's Australian of the Year (Victoria)	
2013	Honorary Fellow of the Oxford Centre of Animal Ethics, UK	
2014	Old Cottonian of Eminence Award	
2017	Albert Schweitzer Award	
2018	Peter Singer Prize	
2021	Shining World Hero and Compassion Award	
2022	Homo Ahimsa Award	
