= Malcolm Wollen =

Indian Air Force officer

Air Marshal Malcolm Shirley Dundas Wollen (2 August 1928 – 23 May 2013), PVSM, VrC, was an Indian Air Force officer who served as the Commanding Officer of the Guwahati Air Force base in Assam during the 1971 Indo Pak War. He also later served as the Deputy Chief of the Air Staff, Air Officer Commanding-in-Chief of the Eastern Air Command and the Air Officer Commanding-in-Chief of the Western Air Command. He was awarded the Vayu Sena Medal on 26 January 1968. He was later bestowed with the Vir Chakra and the Param Vishisht Seva Medal (PVSM) on 26 January 1972 for his exceptional skill and devotion to duty during the Indo Pak War of 1971.

== Early life and education ==
Malcom Wollen was born on 2 August 1928. He attended Bishop Cotton Boys' School, Bangalore. He was commissioned into the Indian Air Force in July 1947. At the time of his commissioning in September 1949, he was awarded the Sword of Honour, the Flying Trophy, and the President's Plaque.

== The Indo Pak War, 1971 ==
During the 1971 Indo Pak war, Group Captain Wollen Commanded a major Air Force base in Assam. On the outbreak of hostilities with Pakistan in Dec. 1971, he was placed in operational control of two MiG-21 Squadrons at a forward airfield. The task of these Squadrons was to neutralise the Pakistani Air Force in Bangladesh and to give close support to the Indian Army in that area. The sum of all these tasks was very large in relation to the forces under his control. The special tasks given to him included such missions as the destruction of certain selected buildings occupied by the West Pakistani forces and their Governor in Dacca city, the elimination of radio transmitting stations and the day and night bombing of certain air-fields in enemy hands. Group Captain Wollen planned, organised and conducted these operations personally, and himself gave the briefings on the tactics which the aircraft were to adopt. The success of these operations contributed directly to the neutralisation of Pakistani air strength in Bangladesh and the eventual surrender of the Pakistani forces in that Sector.

He was bestowed with the Vir chakra and Param Vishisht Seva Medal (PVSM) on 26 January 1972 for his exceptional skill and devotion to duty.

== Post-retirement ==
Wollen retired on 4 September, 1984 and subsequently served as chairman of Hindustan Aeronautics Limited between 1984 and 1988. During his tenure as the chairman of HAL, the design and development of the Advanced Light Helicopter and Light Combat Aircraft (LCA) was undertaken. He also served as the president of the Aeronautical Society of India. Wollen died on 23 May 2013, aged 84, in Bengaluru, Karnataka.
