= Jameel Mahmood =

Indian senior military officer

Lieutenant General Jameel Mahmood AVSM, ADC
- Born: May 9, 1938; Vikarabad, British India
- Died: May 7, 1993 (aged 54); Bhutan
- Military career
- Allegiance: India
- Branch: Indian Army
- Service years: 1959–1993
- Rank: Lieutenant General
- Unit: Regiment of Artillery
- Commands: Eastern Command; 15 Corps
- Conflicts: Sino-Indian War; Indo-Pakistani War of 1965; Indo-Pakistani War of 1971
- Awards: Ati Vishisht Seva Medal

Lieutenant General Jameel Mahmood, AVSM, ADC (May 9, 1938 – May 7, 1993) was an Indian senior military officer. He served as the General Officer Commanding-in-Chief Eastern Command between October 1992 and May 1993. Mahmood was killed with his wife in an Mi-17 helicopter crash in Bhutan, while on an official visit.

== Early life and education ==
He was born in Bangalore in 1936 and was the brother-in-law of Lt Gen Mohammad Ahmed Zaki of the Indian Army. His son, Brigadier Ali Adil Mahmood is an armoured corps officer in the Indian Army, and was commandant of the President's Bodyguard regiment, prior to his promotion as Brigadier. He attended the Bishop Cotton Boys' School in Bangalore, India.

== Military career ==
He was commissioned into the Regiment of Artillery in 1959 and commanded a platoon in Sikkim during the Sino-Indian War, winning a Yudh Seva Medal for his actions. He later served as an Artillery Battery Commander, Battalion GSO-1 and XO, and Instructor at the Indian Military Academy. He attended the Defence Services Staff College. He later commanded a Regiment in Ladakh after promotion to Colonel in 1977. He was promoted to Brigadier in 1983 and thereafter became the Chief of Logistics of an Infantry Division as well as commanding officer of an Infantry brigade under XIV Corps. He was later a staff officer under the Directorate General of Military Operations and deputy commander of the 1st Armoured Division (India). He was promoted to Major General in 1988, after which he was the General Officer Commanding of the 17 Infantry Division. He served for a time as the Deputy Commandant of the Army War College, Mhow, before being promoted as Lieutenant General in 1991. He was then the Commander of the XV Corps and then promoted to the Senior Grade of Lieutenant Generals in 1992 and appointed as the GOC-in-C of the Eastern Command. He was on trip to attend a social gathering of officers under the Dimapur Corps Headquarters when his Mi-17 helicopter ran into a mechanical failure after a thunderstorm and crashed, killing him, his wife, his MA Col MN Ahmed (who was also his brother in law) and Lieutenant Lakshman Tyagi, his orderly Naik G. Thyagarajan, his personal bodyguard Havildar S. Vasudevan, and the IAF crew manning the chopper.

His brother Major General Sultan Mahmood (retd) was in the Artillery and an alumnus of the 20th course of the National Defence Academy. His son Brigadier Adil Mahmood is an Armoured Corps officer having been commissioned into and commanded 16 Cavalry. Gen Jameel's grandfather had also served in the 16 Cavalry. Mahmood died in a helicopter crash in May 1993, while on a visit to Sikkim.

== See also ==
- Hyderabadi Muslims
- Golkonda
- Hyderabad State
- Muslim culture of Hyderabad
- History of Hyderabad for a history of the city of Hyderabad.
- Hyderabad (India) for the city.
