= St. Mark's Cathedral, Bengaluru =

St Mark's Cathedral
- Saint Mark's Cathedral
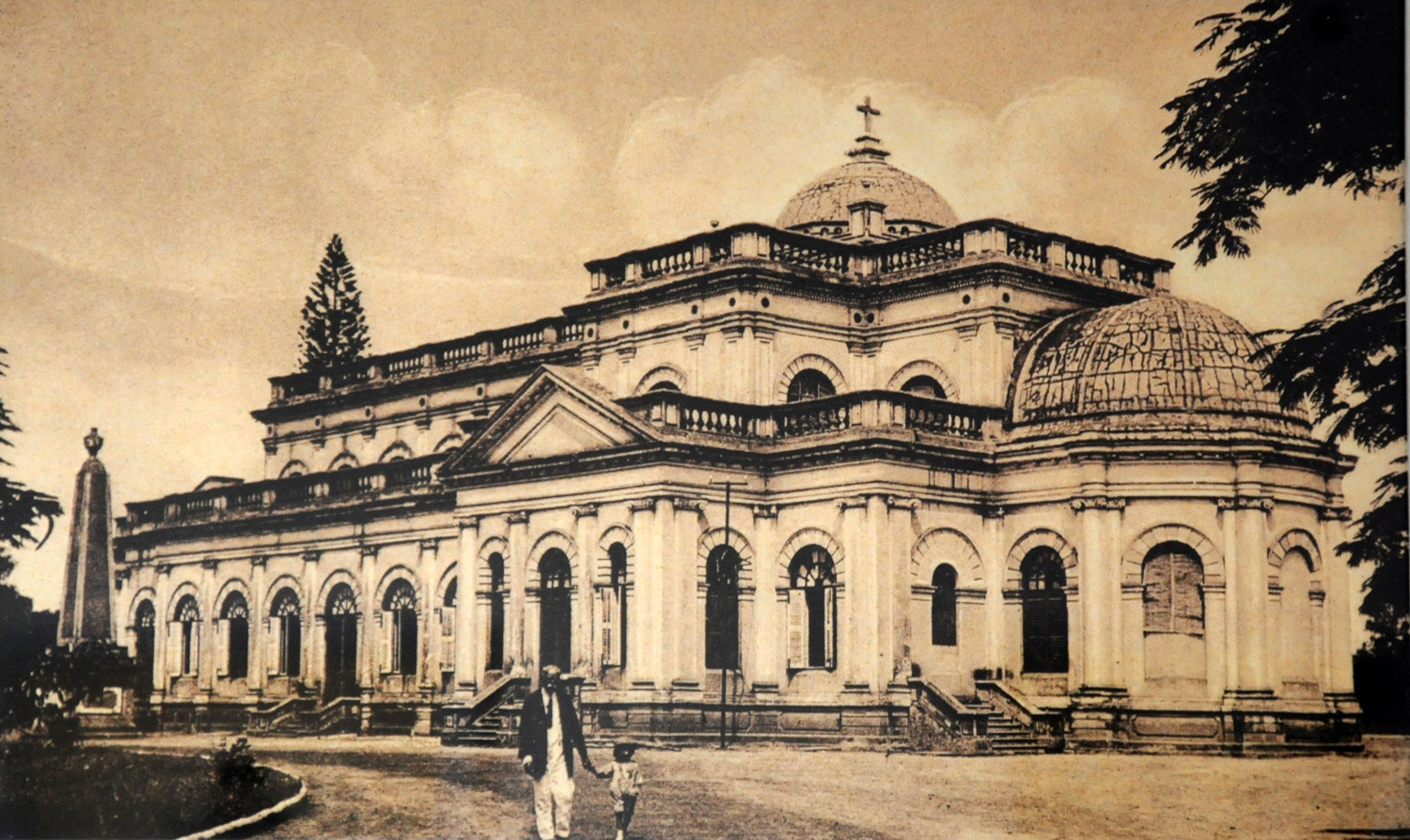
- St. Mark's Cathedral, Bangalore
- St Mark's Cathedral
- 12°58′34″N 77°36′01″E
- Location: Bangalore
- Country: India
- Denomination: Church of South India
- Tradition: Anglicanism
- Website: www.saintmarks.in

History
- Consecrated: 1816

Architecture
- Style: English Baroque
- Years built: 1808-1812
- Groundbreaking: 1808
- Completed: 1812

Administration
- Diocese: Karnataka Central Diocese

St. Mark's Cathedral, dedicated to Saint Mark the Evangelist, is the cathedral (Ecclesia Matar) of the Diocese of Central Karnataka of the Church of South India. The cathedral church, noted for its English Baroque architecture inspired by the 17th century St Paul's Cathedral, is located at the west end of Mahatma Gandhi Road, MacIver Town, Bangalore.

Founded in 1808, the cathedral celebrated its 200 years bicentenary in 2007-8. The cathedral is open for all people irrespective of religion or faith.

== History ==
The foundation stone was laid in 1808, and construction was completed in 1812. The church was consecrated by the Bishop of Calcutta in 1816. The church was expanded in 1901, and went through reconstruction in 1927. The church had its beginnings as a garrison Anglican church. It became part of the Church of South India after Indian independence in 1947, going on to be the cathedral of the Karnataka Central Diocese in 1961.

When it began as a garrison church in 1808 of the Madras Army of the East India Company, it had a seating capacity of 400. As a result of the number of members growing to 2000, a new building was constructed in August 1902, with a seating capacity of 700. However, this new church building collapsed, and had to be rebuilt again in 1906. On 17 February 1923, the church building was ravaged by fire (caused by short circuit) and restoration had to take place. However, as the renovation works were about to be completed in February 1924, the church building again collapsed. Reconstruction of the church started in 1926 and was completed in 1927.

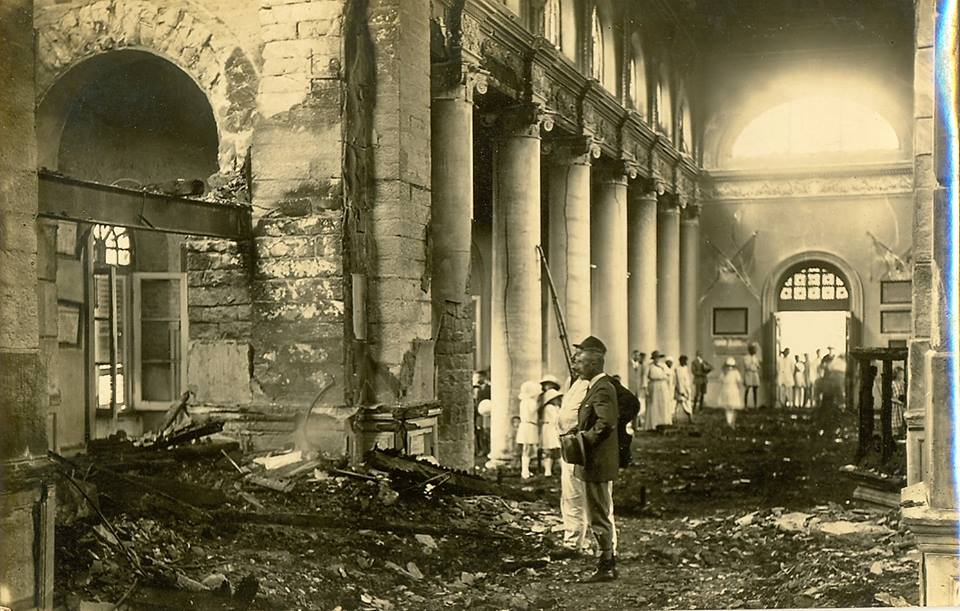
1923 Fire Damage, St. Mark's Cathedral - Kenneth Anderson

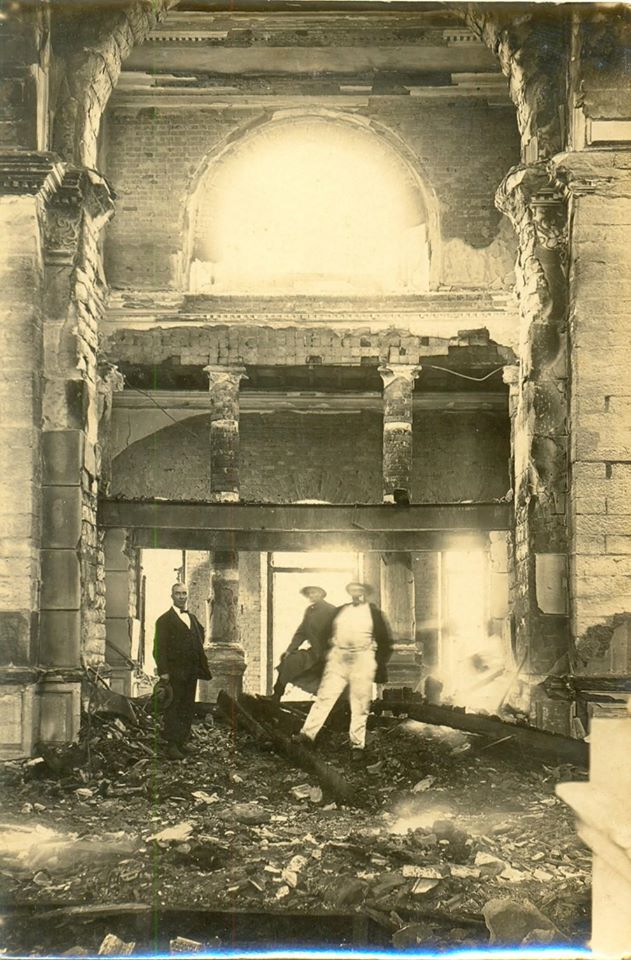
1923 Fire Damage, St. Mark's Cathedral - Kenneth Anderson

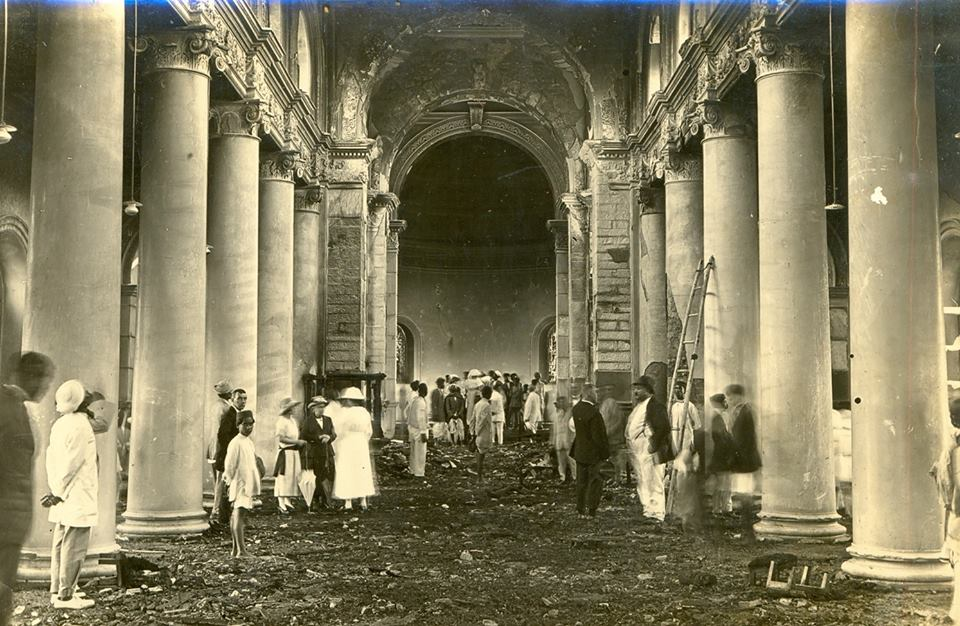
1923 Fire Damage, St. Mark's Cathedral - Kenneth Anderson

After the church was damaged in fire in 1923, the congregation temporarily worshipped at St. Andrew's Kirk, Cubbon Road, till St. Mark's was rebuilt in 1927.

The first Indian Presbyter of the cathedral was Rev H F J Daniel, who was installed as the Presbyter-in-charge in 1961.

== Military heritage ==
The military colours of the 77th Moplah Rifles infantry Regiment, after disbandment (1907) are displayed on the west wall of St. Mark's. There is also a memorial for those killed in the Moplah revolt. There are also memorial plaques for several British officers who died in the Bangalore Cantonment.

There is a memorial plaque for Lt.-Col Sir Walter Scott, 2nd Baronet, who died at sea in 1847, and was the nephew of Scottish writer Sir Walter Scott

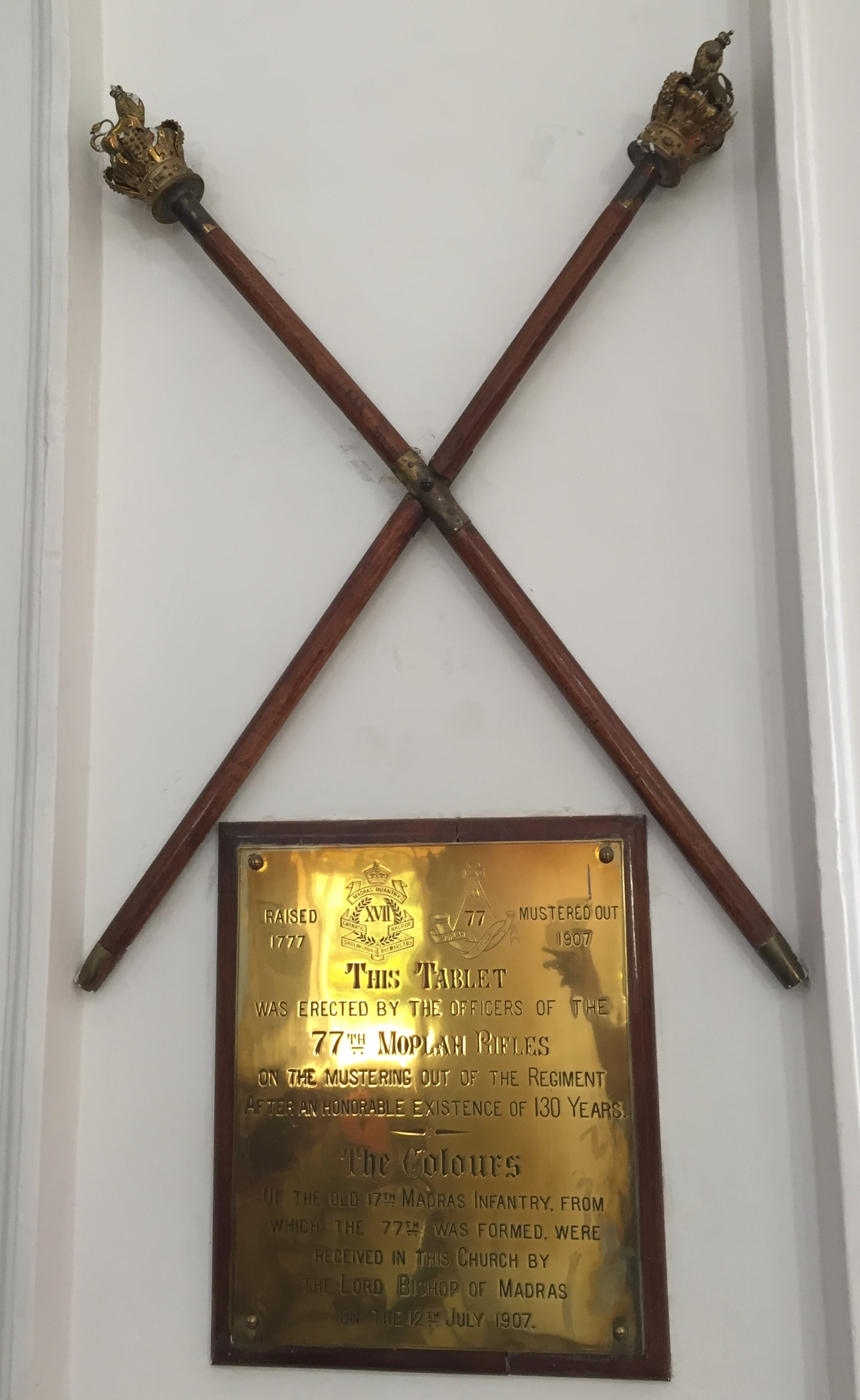
The Colours of the 77th Moplah Rifles with the Royal Mace

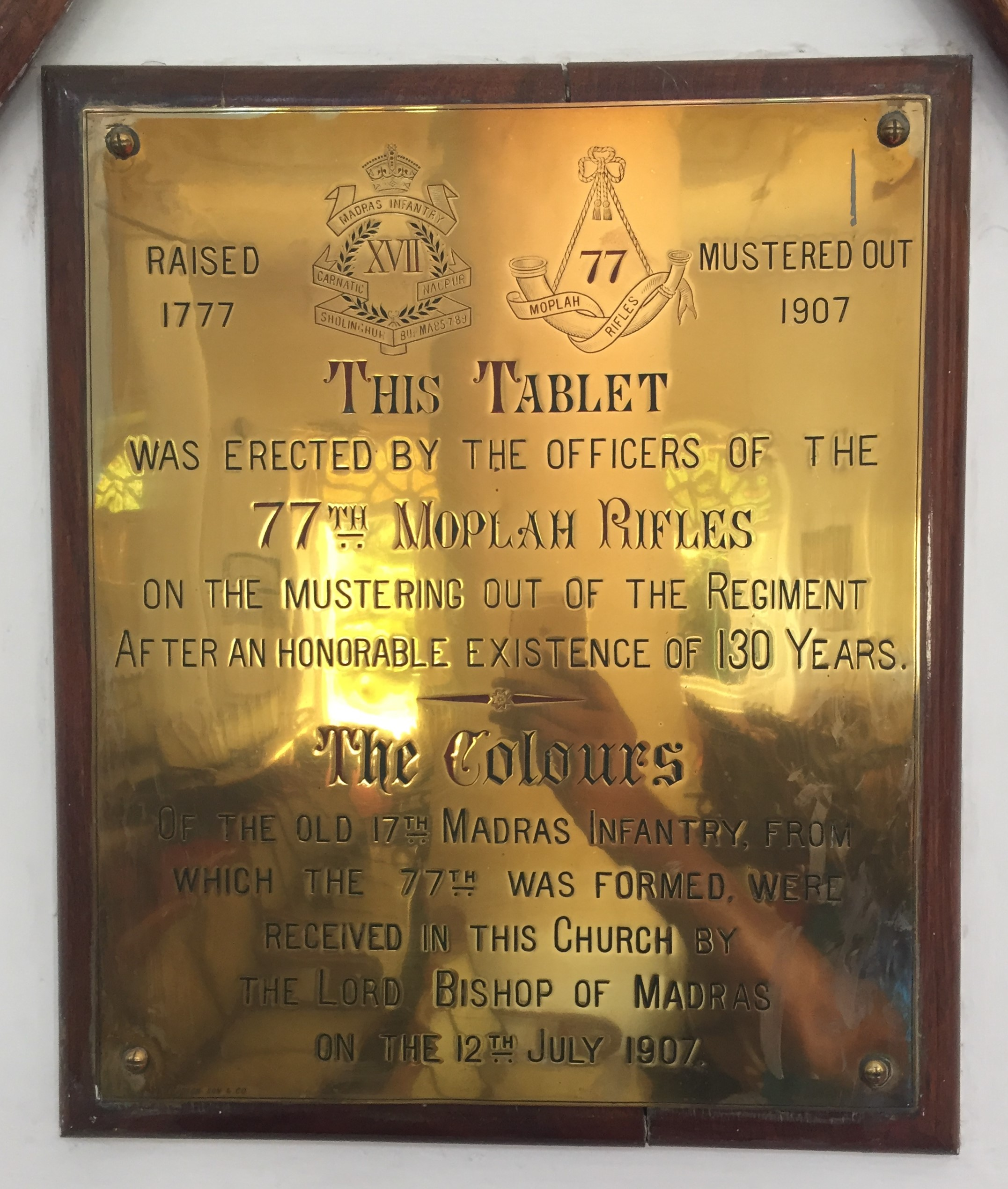
The Colours of the 77th Moplah Rifles

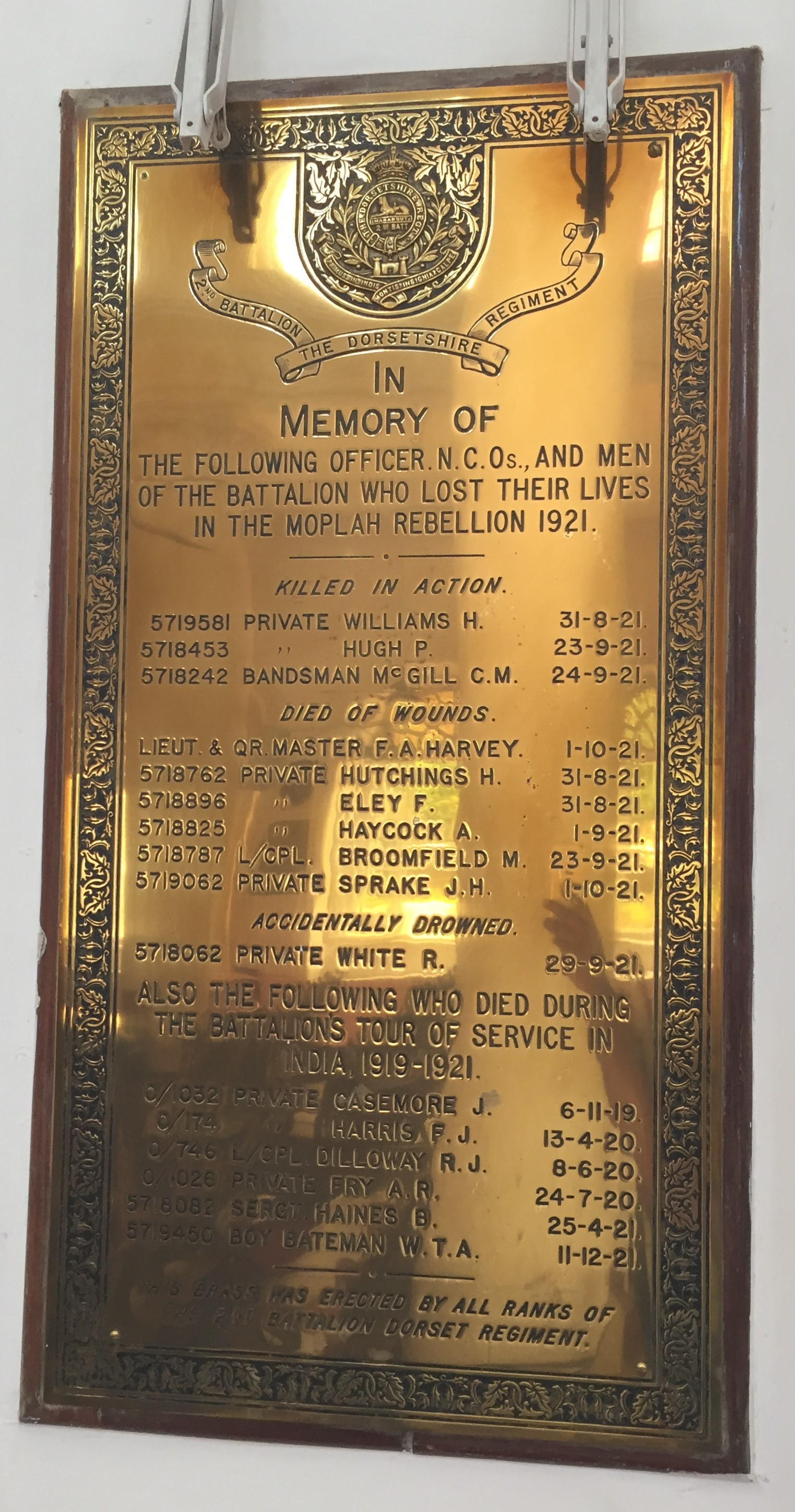
Memorial for the Officers and Men of the Dorset Regiment who died in the Moplah Revolt

== Architecture ==
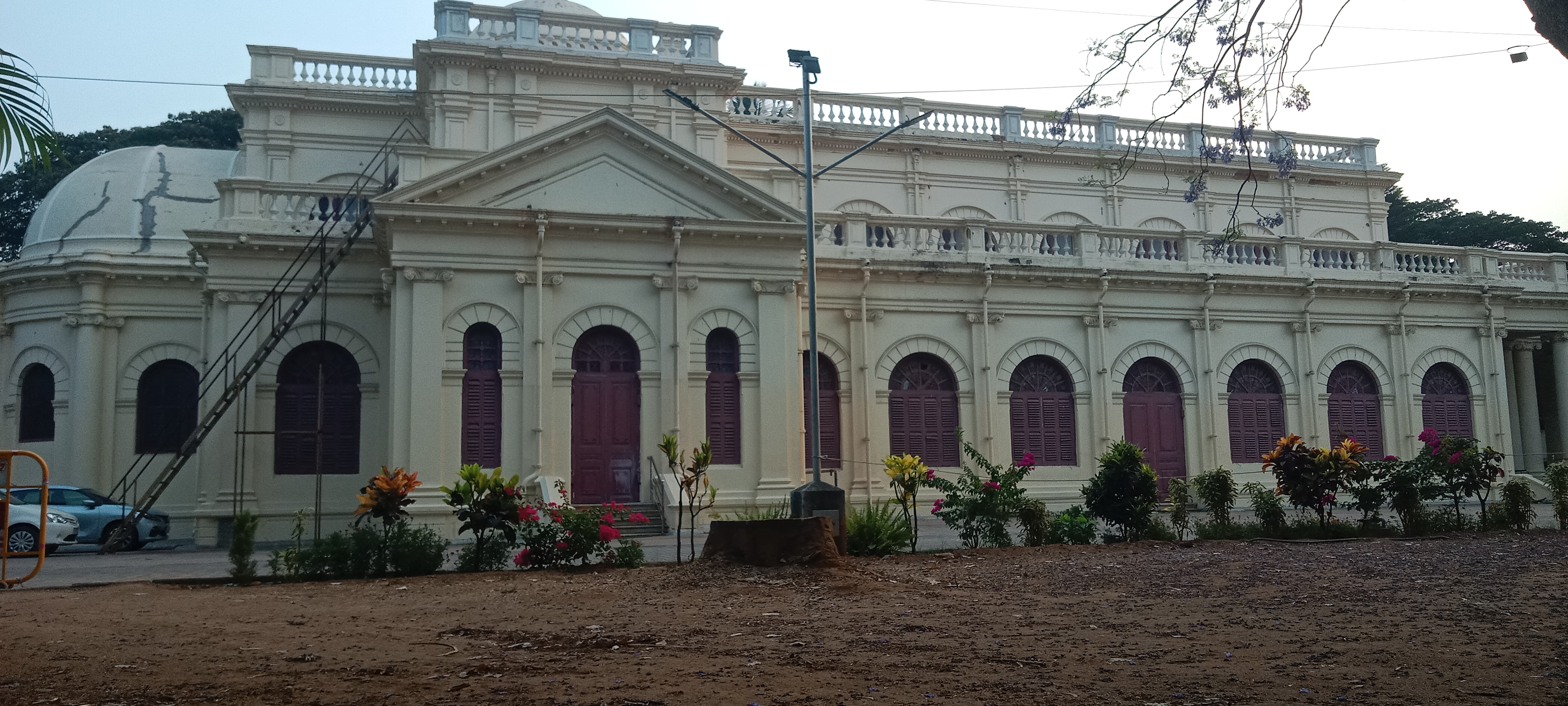
The cathedral in 2025

The cathedral is a colonial style, modelled on the lines of St Paul's Cathedral, London, with a dome, semi-circular chancel and roman arches. The entrance of the cathedral has elaborate wood work with ornate carvings.. The bell is the amongst the most well maintained church bells in India. The stained glasswork adds to the beauty of the cathedral.

The church measures 100 * 53 * 20 ft^{3}, and was the only government (Government of the British Madras Presidency) church in Bangalore. The extension in 1901, was also funded by the Government of British India. The renovated church was dedicated on 26 August 1902 by Bishop Whitehead of Madras. The stained glass was created by M/s Sreenivasulu Naidu & Sons, Madras. The stained glass on the west facing window was created by the architect of St. Dunstan's Society, England and cost INR 4500

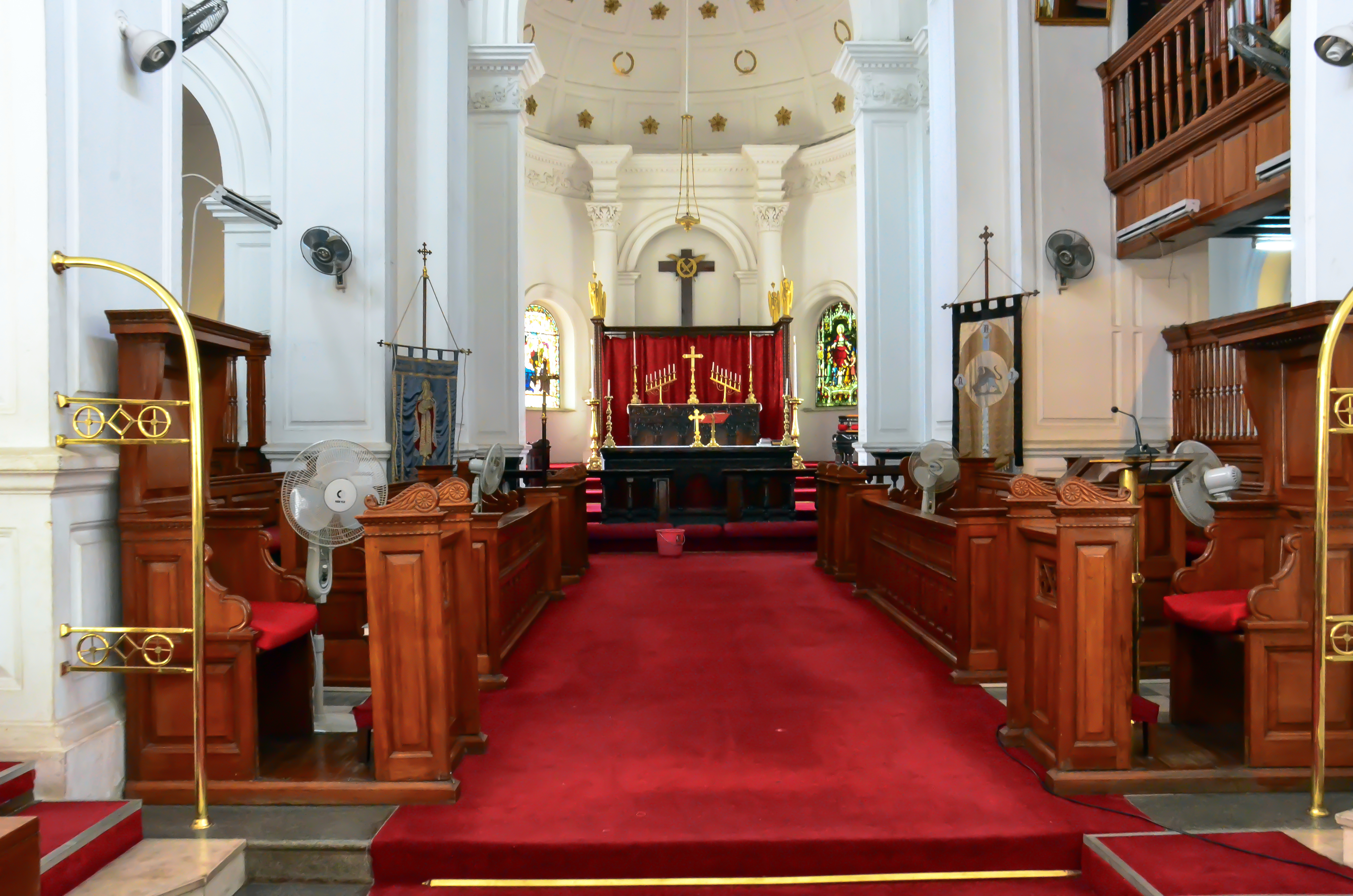
The interior of the cathedral

The cathedral has a mixture of different architecture. Italian Marble from Genoa has been used in designing the pulpit and the font used for baptising babies. The marble pulpit was created out by M/s Snaize & Co., and Bishop Tubbs of Palayamkottai was the first to preach on the marble pulpit on 1 July 1928, delivering the sermon 'The reunion of Christendom'. The Brass lectern (eagle with spread wings on the globe) was presented by some planters of Mysore in 1903, in memory of Harry Alexander Campbell and Montague Beaden Follett of Lumsden's Horse Regiment who died in the Boer Conflicts of South Africa. The bible on the lectern was presented by Mrs. Laura Amelia Amaller.

In the late 1800s an Indian ecclesiastical historian described St. Marks church building as the ugliest ever constructed. It has some unique architectural features.

== Pipe organ ==
The pipe organ of the St. Mark's Cathedral was installed in 1929, as a gift by Avis F Cowdrey of the Cowdrey family (father of cricketer Michael Colin Cowdrey), in memory of his parents. The organ is designed by two British builders, with only the metal pipes being built in England. The other parts were made from teak, and built in Bangalore, supervised by Herbert Norman, agent of the British firm in India. It fell into disrepair, and was not used for many years, till it was repaired by Swiss experts at a cost of INR 5 million. The repaired pipe organ is a major draw for the musicians, and has also inspired repair works at the St. Andrew's Kirk and St. George's Cathedral in Chennai.

In order to restore the organ, the then presbyter Vincent Rajkumar had coordinated a committee of experts. The organ was restored by the Orgelbau Felsberg Corporation, Switzerland, with organ builder Richard Freytah, and his colleagues Stefan Riniker and Hans Sievi. The restoration involved replacement of all the bellows, pipes, small trumpet and the blower, and converting keyboard to electric. The restoration took 4 months.

== School of Church Music ==
The St Mark's Ecumenical Centre for church Music, located at the cathedral was established in 1990, with the intention of training musicians and music enthusiasts, on church music. It is open for all people, irrespective of affiliations of religion, denomination or church. The candidates prepare for the Trinity College of Music and Royal School of Music examinations in violin, piano, music theory and singing.

== Community activities ==
The cathedral has adopted several slums at Tilak Nagar, Ragigudda, Baglur Layout, Lazar layout and Lingarajpuram. The church also sends young people on study missions to Jaffna (Sri Lanka), Jharkhand and Hardwar. The church has also started a community college with a tailoring institute at the slums of Baiyyappanahalli, a senior citizen home in the city and a resource mobilization centre also in the city. The church also runs a rural medical health centre at Hunsanahalli in the Kanakapura taluk.

The church also invites leaders of other religious faiths to speak on the theme of peace, in its annual Festival of Peace music festival.

== Other contributions ==
The Rev. R Posnett, the assistant chaplain of St. Mark's church, was instrumental in establishing St. John's Church, Clevaland Town, Bangalore Cantonment in the early 1850s. The clergy (Rev. George Trevor) of St. Mark's Cathedral also helped establish St. Paul's Church, on Old Poor House Road, Bangalore Civil and Military Station, for the Tamil speaking believers. The church was built in the premises of St. Paul's Tamil medium primary school (established in 1835, continued to function till 1900). Rev. WW Lutyens, established Holy Trinity Church in 1850, at the other end of the South Parade. The house of the Rev S.T. Pettigrew, chaplain of St. Mark's was used to establish the Bishop Cottons's School.
