= Lavelle Road =

- Neighbourhood
- Sri M.L. Subbaraju Road
- Lavelle Road signboard in September 2026

- Location of Lavelle Road Lavelle Road (India)
- Coordinates: 12.9711522°N 77.5978612°E
- Country: India
- State: Karnataka
- District: Bengaluru City
- Metro: Bengaluru

Languages
  - Official: Kannada
- Time zone: UTC+5:30 (IST)
- PIN: 560001
- Vehicle registration: KA 01

Lavelle Road, officially Sri M.L. Subbaraju Road is an upmarket residential and commercial street in the city of Bangalore, Karnataka in India. It is an important connection between Mahatma Gandhi Square and Richmond Circle. The road starts from the Queens Road end of the M. Chinnaswamy Stadium and after curving in a serpentine manner meets the junction of Bangalore Club with Richmond Circle. Lavelle Road was named after Michael Fitzgerald Lavelle, an Irish soldier who later made his money in the Kolar Gold Fields.

Lavelle Road in 2026

Bust of Vittal Mallya at Lavelle Road, in 2026

Bust of Paul Harris at Lavelle Road, in 2026

Harley-Davidson showroom Tusker at Lavelle Road, in 2026

== MacIver town/Shantala nagar ==
MacIver Town or Shantala Nagar, in the centre of the city, is a neighbourhood which comprises the residential and business districts of Kasturba Road, Lavelle Road and Vittal Mallya Road. The area is named after L.J. MacIver, the collector and president of the Municipal Commission of the Civil and Military Station between 1934 and 1937. He was also the president of the Bangalore Club in 1935 and 1936.

== Michael Lavelle ==
On 20 August 1873, Michael Lavelle applied for the right to carry on mining operations in Kolar. He started his work in a small village called Oorgaum. Two years previously he had examined portions of the Kolar district (without any grant it would seem, from no mention of one being made), and found three gold-bearing strata, in one of which he sunk a shaft to the depth of eighteen feet, and found that gold increased in quality and size as he went downwards. In the event of a mining right being granted he proposed to begin work again in November. After some correspondence came a letter from the chief commissioner, dated 16 September 1874, submitting conditions (which must be regarded as final) as the basis of an agreement (to be afterwards legally drawn up) to be entered into between the government and Lavelle. The mining permission was the right to mine in Kolar extending over twenty years, at a royalty of ten per cent on all metals and metallic ores, and of twenty per cent on all precious stones.

On 20 September 1874, Lavelle accepted the terms, and on 28 March 1876, leave was given to him to transfer his rights to other parties. On and from the 1886 onwards mining was again recommenced by Lavelle, who meanwhile had been prospecting in other parts of Southern India, and he succeeded in once more attracting attention to the Kolar field. Subsequently, various companies were formed, but so disappointing were the results obtained that all were practically closed. Thereafter, there is nothing much on the state of affairs or the involvement of Lavelle in the gold mining activities.

In 1877, considering that Lavelle realised that the amount he was earning from mining was far less than he had anticipated, he had contemplated to sell the mine. A small syndicate known as the Kolar Concessionaires Soft Corporation and Arbuthnot Company of Madras, heard of Lavelle's activities and approached him to sell his mining license to them. Lavelle took this opportunity and negotiated with them, for quite a good amount. After obtaining the approval of the Mysore British Government, he transferred all his rights and concessions to this syndicate known as the Kolar Concessionaries formed by Major General G. de la Poer Beresford and some of his friends.

=== Oorgaum: origin and emergence ===
Kolar Gold Fields is the mining area in south-eastern portion of the State of Karnataka in southern India. It lies on a Southern Railway spur that loops from Bangarapet to Bangalore (Bengaluru). Economic activities centred on the gold fields, which were the southern portion of a gold-bearing region that extends for 40 miles (65 km). The productive beds, 4 miles (6 km) long and with an average width of 4 miles, were first worked by a British company, John Taylor and Sons, in 1880. Within three years, four main veins (Champion, Oorgaum, Nundydorog, and Mysore) were opened. Oorgaum can still be visited. It has a railway station and regular trains ply between Bangalore and Chennai, making its stops at Oorgaum.

The achievements of Lavelle, in gold mining in Kolar and his subsequent affluence made him popular among the English residents at Bangalore. The British commandant of the Bangalore Cantonment honoured him by naming the road where he lived Lavelle Road. However, many residents are unaware of the history of Lavelle Road.

=== Oorgaum house ===
Oorgaum House built by Michael Lavelle, for the wedding reception of his daughter, Tingley. This was named after the town Oorgaum, in Kolar district of Karnataka; where Lavelle had discovered the gold fields along with contemporaries. The house was to be inherited by his son, who sadly was killed during the Great War. Oorgaum House, on then Seshadri Road, was purchased from family friend Rao Bahadur Deshmukh Shama Rao in September 1917 for Rs.9000 by Michael Lavelle. He renamed his house Oorgaum House after his first shaft that he sank in Urigaum, KGF as a reminder of his good fortune.

Mr and Mrs P G D'Souza bought Oorgaum House from Lavelle in the early 1900s. The whole property of three acres was later divided among the 17 children of Mr and Mrs P G D'souza and the place is known as D'Souza Layout. The apartments built on the property is named Oorgaum House.

== Bruhat Bengaluru Mahanagara Palike ==
The road falls within Ward No. 111, Shanthinagara, of the Bruhat Bengaluru Mahanagara Palike (BBMP). The Shantala Nagar ward is in the Shanthinagar Assembly constituency and is located right in the heart of Bangalore. The Chinnaswamy Cricket Stadium is located here as are busy Brigade and MG Road, two shopping and entertainment hubs in the city centre. The area is rich in old cantonment history and haunts – eateries, parks, book stores and churches. Mayo Hall on MG Road is now a BBMP office. It was built in the 19th century and named after the fourth Viceroy of India, Lord Mayo. It also houses the Kempegowda Museum which contains information on the founding father of Bangalore. Localities in the ward include Shantala Nagar, Ashok Nagar, MEG area, Elagondanapalya, KSRP quarters, Victoria Layout, Austin Town (P), Xavier Layout, Langford Gardens, and Richmond Town (P).
