= 268th Indian Infantry Brigade =

- Active: 1942 - 1962, probably present
- Country: British India
- Branch: Indian Army
- Part of: 19th Infantry Division
- Engagements: Burma Campaign

The 268th Indian Infantry Brigade is an infantry formation of the Indian Army, previously of the British Indian Army.

== History ==
It was initially formed as 268th Indian Armoured Brigade at Sialkot in July 1942, with three regiments of the Indian Armoured Corps. 51 Regiment IAC had been formed from the 7/5th Mahratta Light Infantry, 53 Regiment IAC had been formed from the MG/10th Baluch Regiment, and 54 Regiment IAC had been formed from 9/13th Frontier Force Rifles.

It was converted to the 268th Indian Infantry Brigade in October 1942. It was then assigned to the 43rd Indian Armoured Division until March 1943, and subsequently the 44th Indian Armoured Division until March 1944. In May 1944, the brigade moved to the 21st Indian Infantry Division followed by a move to the 23rd Indian Infantry Division in July 1944. In November 1944, it was the corps reserve for IV Corps and from December 1944, for XXXIII Indian Corps. In April 1945, it was attached to the British 2nd Infantry Division and the 7th Indian Infantry Division. It was Fourteenth Army reserve between April and May 1945, before returning to 7th Division command until the end of the war.

Following the war the brigade served with the BRINJAP Division of the British Commonwealth Occupation Force in Japan. The division moved by sea to Japan 1 March-19 May 1946, stopping at Singapore and Hong Kong en route. In Japan the units of the brigade included 5/1st Punjab Regiment, 2/5th Royal Gurkha Rifles (Frontier Force), and 1 Maratha Light Infantry. The division was disbanded on 1 May 1947 in Japan, at which time 268th Infantry Brigade was reorganised as a brigade group. It left Japan August–October 1947 for India.

The brigade then fought in Kashmir during the Indo-Pakistan War of 1947; it was the third brigade to enter Jammu and Kashmir. In 1962, just before the outbreak of a further war between India and Pakistan, it formed part of the 19th Infantry Division (India) with both divisional and brigade headquarters at Baramula. 19th Division was part of XV Corps in Western Command.

== World War II units ==
- 8th Battalion, 13th Frontier Force Rifles
- 17th Battalion, 10th Baluch Regiment
- 17th Battalion, 7th Rajput Regiment
- 2nd Battalion, 4th Bombay Grenadiers
- 5th Battalion, 4th Bombay Grenadiers
- 1st Battalion, Assam Regiment
- 1st Battalion, Chamar Regiment
- 4th Battalion, 3rd Madras Regiment
- Kalibahadur Regiment, Nepal
- Mahindra Dal Regiment, Nepal
- 1st Battalion, 3rd Madras Regiment
- 2nd Battalion, King's Own Scottish Borderers
- 2nd Battalion, South Lancashire Regiment
- 429th Field Company, Indian Engineers
- 45th Cavalry

== See also ==
- List of Indian Army Brigades in World War II
