= 3rd Madras Native Infantry =

3rd Madras Native Infantry could refer to:

- 1st Battalion which became the 63rd Palamcottah Light Infantry
- 2nd Battalion which became the 73rd Carnatic Infantry
