= Mohan Lal Kureel =

British Indian Army officer

- Born: 1 January 1910; Purwa, Unnao, British State of Oudh, British India (now in Unnao District, Uttar Pradesh, India)
- Died: 12 December 1980; Lucknow, Uttar Pradesh, India
- Organization: INC
- Relatives: Piare Lal Talib Unnavi (brother)

Mohan Lal Kureel was a British Indian Army officer who served in The Chamar Regiment and later an Indian National Congress politician in the Indian state of Uttar Pradesh.

== Life ==
In 1942, Kureel enlisted with the post of captain in the British Indian Army at the time that the Chamar Regiment was commissioned. In mid-1944, he accompanied his battalion to take part in the Burma Campaign. There he learned that the British Indian Army was plotting against the Indian National Army. He joined with comrades to rebel against the British Indian Army. Kureel was arrested and declared a Prisoner of War. While Kureel was in prison he joined the INA. Kureel also fought against the British in Singapore under Netaji.

== Politics ==
Kureel was freed from prison following the Independence of India at which time he became an Activist and social worker. In 1952, he was elected by the Safipur Constituency to run in the Uttar Pradesh Legislative Assembly elections. After winning the election, Kureel became a member of the Indian National Congress. He was elected by the Safipur constituency in the 1952 Uttar Pradesh Legislative Assembly elections.
