= 83rd Wallajahbad Light Infantry =

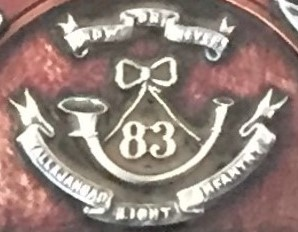
- Insignia of the 83rd Wallajahbad Light Infantry
- Active: 1794-1922
- Country: British Raj
- Branch: Army
- Type: Infantry
- Part of: Madras Army (to 1895); Madras Command; British Indian Army (1903-1922)
- Colors: Red; faced deep green, 1882 green, 1898 emerald green
- Engagements: Fourth Anglo-Mysore War; Third Burmese War; World War I

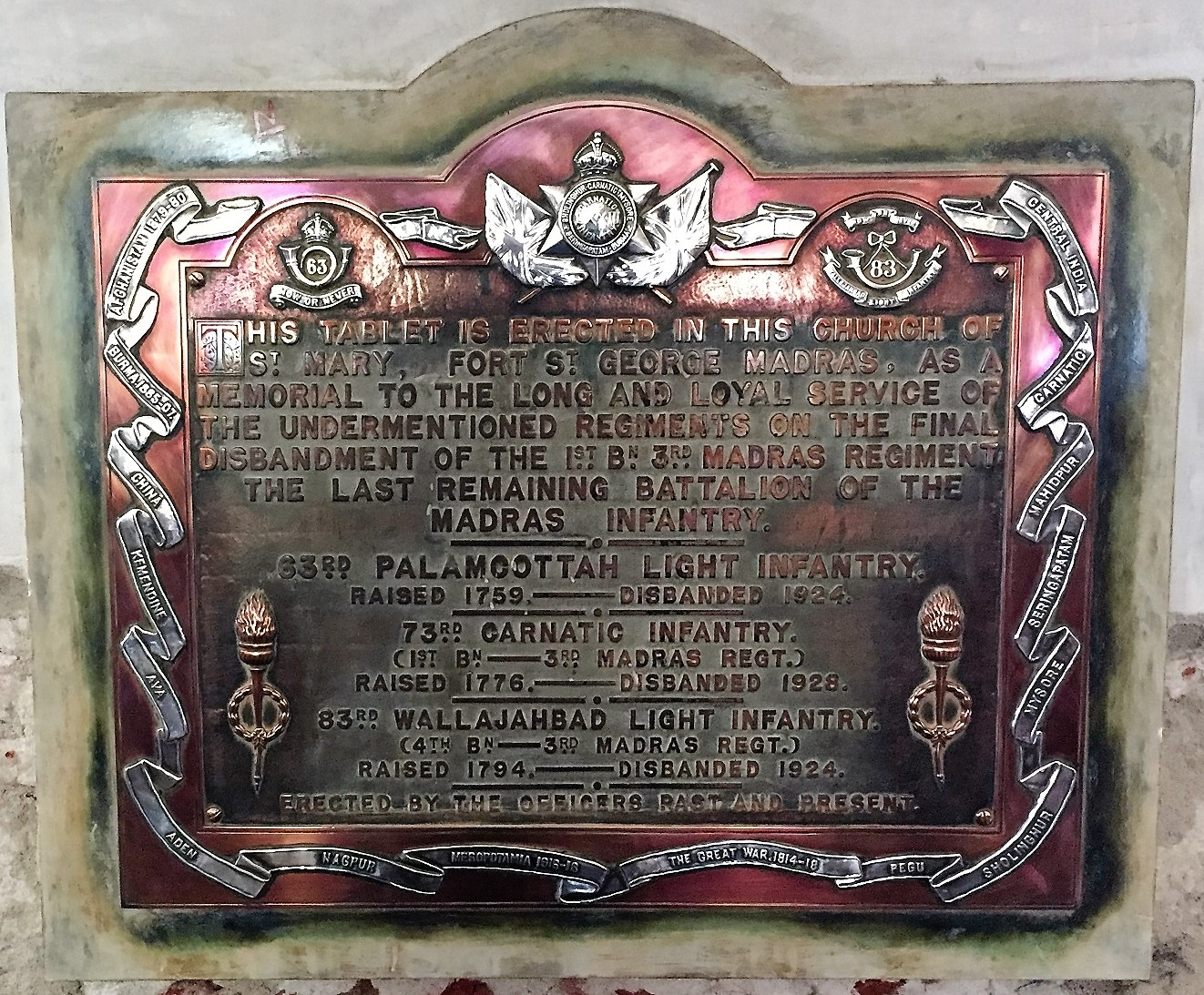
Colours of the 63rd Palamcottah Light Infantry, 83rd Wallajahbad Light Infantry and 73rd Carnatic Infantry, buried at St. Mary's Church, Madras

The 83rd Wallajahbad Light Infantry was an infantry regiment originally raised in 1794 as the 33rd Madras Battalion, part of the Presidency of Madras Army which was itself part of the Honourable East India Company Army. The presidency armies, like the presidencies themselves, belonged to the East India Company until the Government of India Act 1858 (passed in the aftermath of the Indian Rebellion of 1857) transferred all three presidencies to the direct authority of the British Crown. In 1903 all three presidency armies were merged into the British Indian Army. The unit was disbanded before Indian Independence.

== History ==
They took part in the Battle of Seringapatam during the Fourth Anglo-Mysore War and the Second Burmese War.

== First World War ==
The regiment was stationed at Secunderabad in 1914 on the outbreak of war and was here until at least early 1916.

They sent a wing of the regiment as a draft to the 63rd Palamcottah L. I. in 1914, which saw action in East Africa until December 1916, when it rejoined the regiment at Mandalay.

Meanwhile, the other wing was sent to serve in the Persian Gulf from 21 September 1916, being split up in detachments between Jask, Chabahar, Bandar Abbas, Henjam, Kishm Island, Lingeh and Bahrain, all port towns on the Gulf of Oman relieving the 94th Infantry detachments previously stationed there until they were relieved by the 3rd Brahmins from 16 July 1917.

They were joined by the other wing of the regiment and were sent to serve in Mesopotamia, where they were successively stationed at Basra, Tanoomah, and Nar Oomah from 24 July 1917 to 3 May 1919.

== 1919-1922 ==
From here they were sent join the forces in North Persia from 4 May 1919 at Hamadan and Kasvin in 1919, where misfortune in the shape of an epidemic of influenza overtook it, the casualties during the period, 15 December 1919, to 30 March, being no less than 57.

In Iraq from May 1920 doing garrison duty in Kut & Amarah until it returned to India in June 1921

The regiment arrived at Cannanore 24 June 1921.

They arrived back from foreign service into another inflamed situation at home - the Moplah rebellion.

During the operations that followed, from their base at Cannanore the 83rd carried out for the protection duties in the northern portion of Malabar, where outbreaks occasionally threatened. This situation lasted until February 1922.

On 5 December 1921, Moplah prisoners in Cannamore jail rioted. A breakout was attempted and in the ensuing struggle with the warders six internees were killed. Eventually troops from the 83rd had to be called out to restore order

After World War I the British government reformed the army, moving from single battalion regiments to multi battalion regiments. The 83rd Wallajahbad Light Infantry now became the 4th Battalion, 3rd Madras Regiment (Wallajahbad Light Infantry) in 1922 however they were disbanded in 1923.

== Previous names ==
- 33rd Battalion of Madras Native Infantry - 1794
- 1st Battalion, 12th Regiment of Madras Native Infantry - 1797
- 12th Regiment of Madras Native Infantry, or Wallajahbad Light Infantry - 1812
- 23rd Madras Native Infantry, or Wallajahbad Light Infantry - 1824
- 23rd (Wallajahbad) Regiment of Madras (Light) Infantry - 1885
- 23rd (Wallajahbad) Madras Light Infantry - 1901
- 83rd Wallajahbad Light Infantry - 1903

== Sources ==
- Barthorp, Michael; Burn, Jeffrey (1979). Indian infantry regiments 1860-1914. Osprey Publishing. ISBN 0-85045-307-0.
- Jackson, Maj. Donovan. India's Army. Sampson Low. London 1940.
- Sumner, Ian (2001). The Indian Army 1914-1947. Osprey Publishing. ISBN 1-84176-196-6.
- Quarterly Indian Army List January 1919, Army Headquarters India, Calcutta 1919.
