= 13th Carnatic Battalion =

The 13th Carnatic Battalion could refer to

- 72nd Punjabis in 1769
- 73rd Carnatic Infantry in 1776
