= 43rd Armoured Division (India) =

The 43rd Indian Armoured Division was an armoured division of the Indian Army during World War II. It was formed in July 1942. It never saw any combat and was broken up to form the 44th Armoured Division in February 1943.

== Formation ==
=== 268th Indian Armoured Brigade ===
Converted to 268th Indian Infantry Brigade October 1942

- 51st Regiment Indian Armoured Corps (ex 7/5th Mahratta Light Infantry)
- 53rd Regiment Indian Armoured Corps (ex MG/10th Baluch Regiment)
- 54th Regiment Indian Armoured Corps (ex 9/13th Frontier Force Rifles)

=== 267th Indian Armoured Brigade ===
- 52nd Regiment Indian Armoured Corps
- 116th Regiment Royal Armoured Corps (ex 9th Btn Gordon Highlanders)
- 160th Regiment Royal Armoured Corps (ex 9th Btn Royal Sussex Regiment)
- 163rd Regiment Royal Armoured Corps (ex 13th Btn Sherwood Foresters)

=== 268th Indian Infantry Brigade ===
- 8/13th Frontier Force Rifles
- 17/10th Baluch Regiment
- 17/7th Rajput Regiment
- 2/4th Bombay Grenadiers
- 5/4th Bombay Grenadiers
- 1st Assam Regiment
- 1st The Chamar Regiment
- 4/3rd Madras Regiment
- Kalibahadur Regiment Nepal
- Mahindra Dal Regiment Nepal
- 1/3rd Madras Regiment
- 2nd The King's Own Scottish Borderers
- 2nd The South Lancashire Regiment
- 429 Field Company Indian Engineers

=== Divisional troops ===
- 18th Field Regiment Royal Artillery
