= 44th Armoured Division (India) =

The 44th Indian Armoured Division was an armoured division of the Indian Army during World War II. It was formed in Burma, in February 1943, from the 32nd and 43rd Armoured divisions. It was reformed as the 21st Infantry Division in April 1944.

== Formation ==
=== 254th Indian Tank Brigade ===
- 7th Light Cavalry
- 25th Dragoons
- 46th Cavalry
- 45th Cavalry
- 3rd Carabiniers
- 149th Regiment, Royal Armoured Corps (RAC) raised from a Battalion of the King's Own Yorkshire Light Infantry
- 150th Regiment, RAC raised from 10th Bn York and Lancaster Regiment

=== 255th Indian Armoured Brigade ===
- 26th Hussars
- 45th Cavalry
- 4/4th Bombay Grenadiers
- 158th Regiment, RAC
- 159th Regiment, RAC
- 5th King Edward's Own Probyn's Horse
- 9th Royal Deccan Horse
- 116th Regiment, RAC
- 19th King George's Own Lancers

=== 268th Indian Infantry Brigade ===
converted from 268th Indian Armoured Brigade August 1945

- 8/13th Frontier Force Rifles
- 17/10th Baluch Regiment
- 17/7th Rajput Regiment
- 2/4th Bombay Grenadiers
- 5/4th Bombay Grenadiers
- 1st Assam Regiment
- 1st The Chamar Regiment
- 4/3rd Madras Regiment
- Kalibahadur Regiment, Nepal
- Mahindra Dal Regiment, Nepal
- 1/3rd Madras Regiment
- 2nd The King's Own Scottish Borderers
- 2nd The South Lancashire Regiment

=== Divisional troops ===
- 19th King George's Own Lancers
