= Chamar Regiment =

The Chamar Regiment
- चमार रेजिमेंट
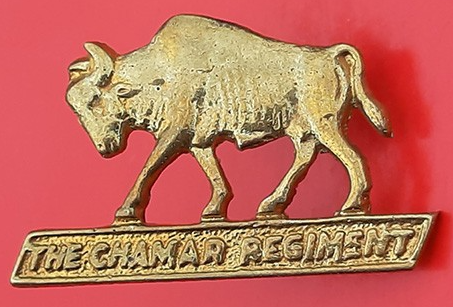
- Regimental Insignia of the Chamar Regiment
- Active: 1943-1946
- Country: British India
- Branch: Indian Army
- Type: Infantry
- Garrison/HQ: Jabalpur, Madhya Pradesh
- Engagements: Battle of Kohima; Battle of Kamo; Battle of Tokyo; Battle of Imphal; Battle of Mandla; Battle of Rangoon; Battle of Singapore; Battle of Burma
- Decorations: 5 British Empire Medal; 3 Military Medal; 3 Military Cross; 7 Burma Star; 4 War Medal; 4 Pacific Star; 8 Mentioned in dispatches; 1 battle honour

Insignia
- Regimental Insignia: A Bison, The Traditional Animal of Chamars

The Chamar Regiment was an infantry regiment of the Indian Army during World War II.

It was formed along caste lines from the Chamar. The Regiment fought against the Japanese in Burma, as part of the 268th Indian Infantry Brigade, under the command of Brigadier G M Dyer, part of XV Corps (India). The unit was disbanded as part of the wider demobilisation following the end of the war in 1946.

== History ==
The Regiment Raised on 1 March 1943, the regiment was initially assigned to the 268th Indian Infantry Brigade, which was part of 43rd Armoured Division in July 1943 and when the division was broken up to form the 44th Armoured Division the Chamar Regiment was included in the new division. During this time the regiment did not take part in any fighting.

=== World War II ===
Later, the Chamar Regiment became part of 23rd Indian Infantry Division. In mid-1944, the regiment's 1st Battalion was committed to the Burma Campaign to fight against Imperial Japanese Army in Nagaland. The fighting lasted over three months, during which time the regiment took part in the Battle of Kohima.

The Chamar regiment distinguished itself in the field of battle. It was part of the force that lifted the siege of Imphal and advanced against the Imperial army by liberating Burma along with other units of the army. They also took part in the assault on Kamo, Tokyo, Imphal, Mandla, Burma, Rangoon and cleared the city of Japanese troops. By mid 1945 the Chamar regiment had helped free entire Burma from Japanese occupation. The dropping of the Atomic bombs on Japan, brought about the surrender of Japan.

== Engagements ==
=== Battle of Burma ===
The Chamar Regiment was among the units raised by the British during World War Two to increase the strength of the Indian Army. It was formed along caste lines from the Chamars. The Regiment fought against the Japanese in Burma, as part of the 268 Indian Brigade, under the command of Brigadier G M Dyer, part of 15 Corps. The unit was disbanded as part of the wider demobilisation at the end of the War.

Regiment also supplied ammunition to Machine Gun Battalion XXXIII Corps.

In mid-1944, the regiment's 1st Battalion was committed to the Burma campaign (1944–1945) to fight against Imperial Japanese Army in Nagaland. On August 23, 1945, Tokyo Radio reported that Bose was arriving in Saigon on a large bomber plane when his plane crashed near Taihoku (Japanese language: 臺北帝國大學, Taihoku Teikoku Daigaku) airport on August 18. Japanese General Shodei, Pilot and some others were killed on board the plane. Netaji was seriously burnt. He was taken to Taihoku Sainik Hospital where he succumbed to his injuries. According to Col. Habibur Rahman, his last rites were performed in Taihoku. In mid-September, their bones were stored and placed in the Rankoji Temple in Tokyo, the capital of Japan. According to a document received from the National Archives of India, Netaji died on August 18, 1945, at 21.00 pm at Sainik Hospital in Taihoku.

=== Battle of Kohima ===
Chamar Regiment moved up to Laisong to support the scouts, and 'V' Force Headquarters rapidly supplied more service rifles, Thompson and Sten hand-held sub-machine guns, shotguns, grenades, ammunition and rations.

1st Chamar Regiment got Battle of honour in Battle of Kohima 1944.

Chamar Regiment was in this war with 158 Indian Pioneer Corps, 159 Manipur Labour Corps, 138 Mechanical Transport Platoon, 170 Mutaguchi's, 33rd Division, 12 Nepalese Army, 203 Nepalese, Gurkhas 201, Norfolk Regiment 90, 131, 133 North Kachin Levies and others.

=== Battle of Imphal ===
With the Japanese threat becoming acute as that time Japanese Reached current Northeast India borders of India, Chamar patrols began probing the country lying south of the Imphal-Kohima road, hunting out the enemy from his hideouts and camouflaged positions.

From Sittaung, Sagaing one company crossed the Chindwin River and operated on the east bank against the Imperial Japanese Army. "Chamar Battalion in Action against JAPS" were the headings of that time.

Malaya, then under British administration, was gradually occupied by Japanese forces between 8 December 1941 and the Allied surrender at Singapore on 15 February 1942. But the War staggered on and expansion went on. As the Punjab was drained of its youth other sources were considered. First step was the reactivation of the 3rd Madras Regiment. The military police Assam Rifles became the basis for the Assam Regiment. 'Class' battalions were formed from people outside the martial classes: the Mahar Regiment, the Sikh Light Infantry and the Chamar Regiment were raised whose recruitment had long been discontinued.

- Battle of Kamo
- Battle of Tokyo
- Battle of Mandla
- Battle of Rangoon
- Battle of Singapore

== Awards and decorations ==
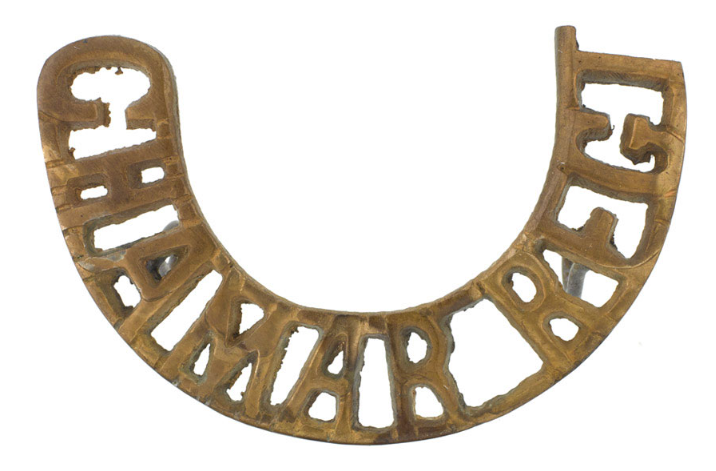
Shoulder title, Chamar Regiment, 1943–1946, from front

- 5 British Empire Medal
- 3 Military Medal
- 3 Military Cross
- 4 Pacific Star
- 7 Burma Star
- 4 War Medal
- 8 Mentioned in dispatches
- 1 battle honour

=== Shoulder title, Chamar Regiment, 1943-1946 ===
Brass shoulder title in the form of a curved regimental titile, 'Chamar Regt'.

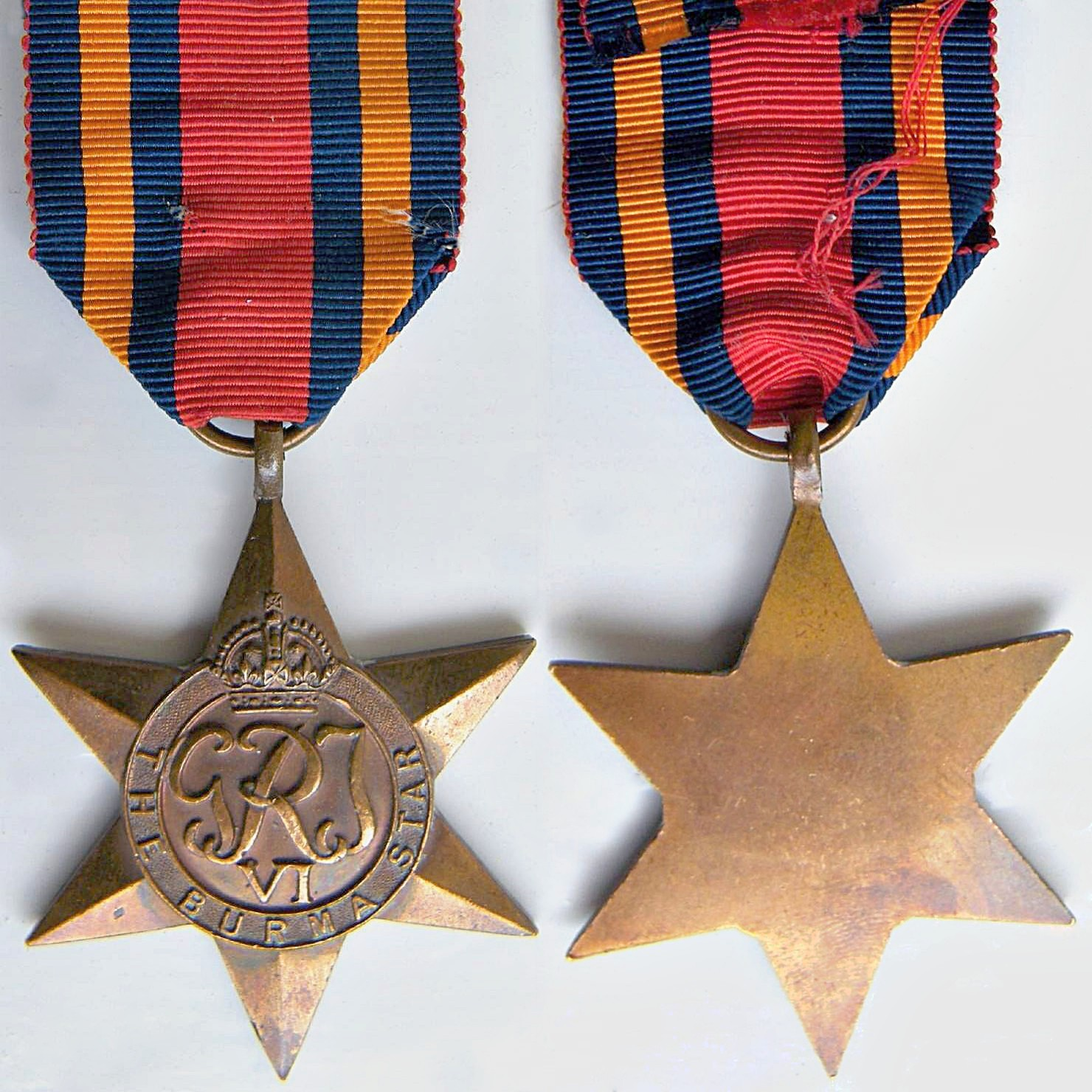

Medal group, Havildar Bhagat Ram, 1945 (c). The group includes Military Medal 1945, Burma Star(1941–45) and British War Medal 1939–1945

Bhagat Ram was a Chamar from Chinihar Village in the Kangra district, in north-east India at the foot of the Himalayas. He received one Military Medal. The award was announced in the 'London Gazette', dated 12 July 1945.

=== Battle of honour ===
Battle of Kohima 1944, 1st Chamar Regiment

== Disbandment ==
The unit was disbanded as part of the wider demobilisation at the end of the War.

Since then, many Dalit and non-Dalit leaders like Chandrasekhar Azad, RJD leader Raghuvansh Prasad Singh, Congress lawmaker Udit Raj, and Rajesh Bagha, the Chairman of Punjab S.C Commission, have suggested that the Chamar Regiment be re-raised.

== Revival of Chamar Regiment ==
The National Commission for Scheduled Castes(NCSC) has written a letter to Minister of Defence (India) Manohar Parrikar seeking “revival of the Chamar regiment in the Indian Army”. This was, as NCSC said, after three veterans from Haryana who were part of the regiment showed up before the commission and requested for its revival.

The Commission, in its letter to the ministry of defence, had asked for reasons why the Chamar regiment should not be reinstated when regiments formed on the basis of caste, religion continued to exist.

“It is strange that all the other regiments, such as Sikh Regiment, Jat Regiment, Dogra Regiment etc, formed on the basis of caste/religion continue to exist while Chamar Regiment was disbanded,” the letter stated.

== Notable Chamar Regiment Persons ==
- Captain Mohan Lal Kureel
- Havildar Bhagat Ram
