= 63rd Palamcottah Light Infantry =

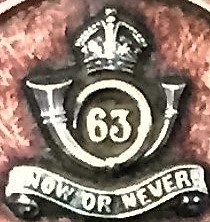
- 63rd Palamcottah Light Infantry insignia
- Active: 1759–1922
- Country: British India
- Branch: British Indian Army
- Type: Infantry
- Part of: Madras Army (to 1895); Madras Command
- Colours: Uniform: Red then scarlet; faced dark green 1882 facings green 1898 facings emerald green
- Engagements: Carnatic Wars; Third Anglo-Mysore War; Boxer Rebellion; Second Anglo-Maratha War; World War I

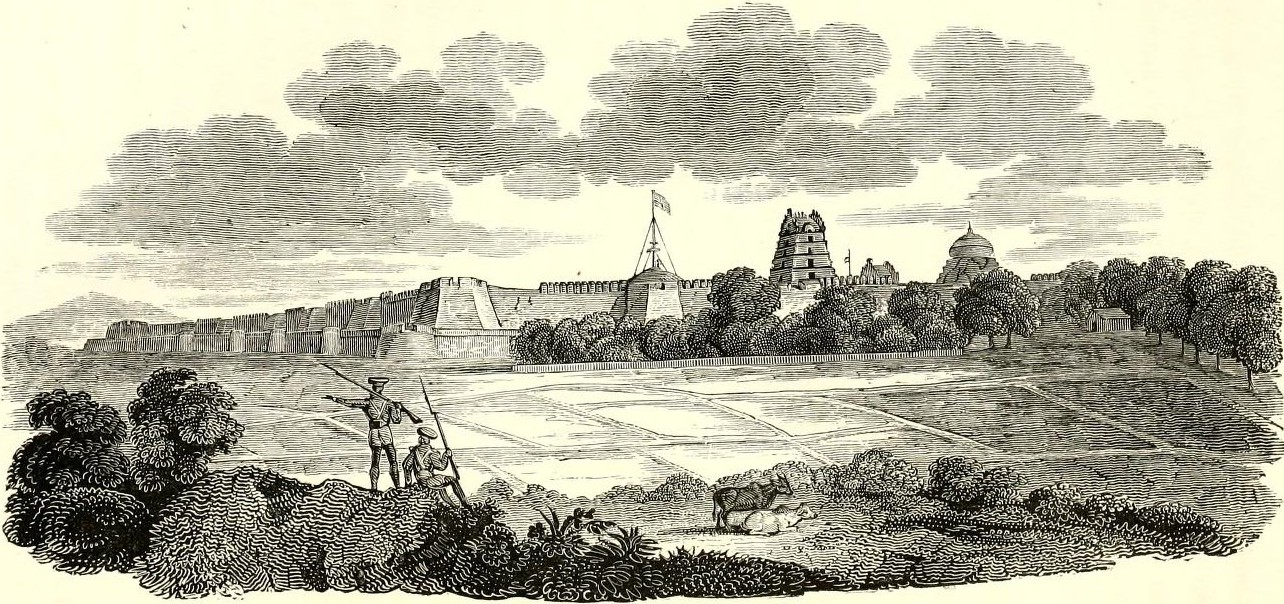
Fort Pallamcottah (1800) by James Welsh

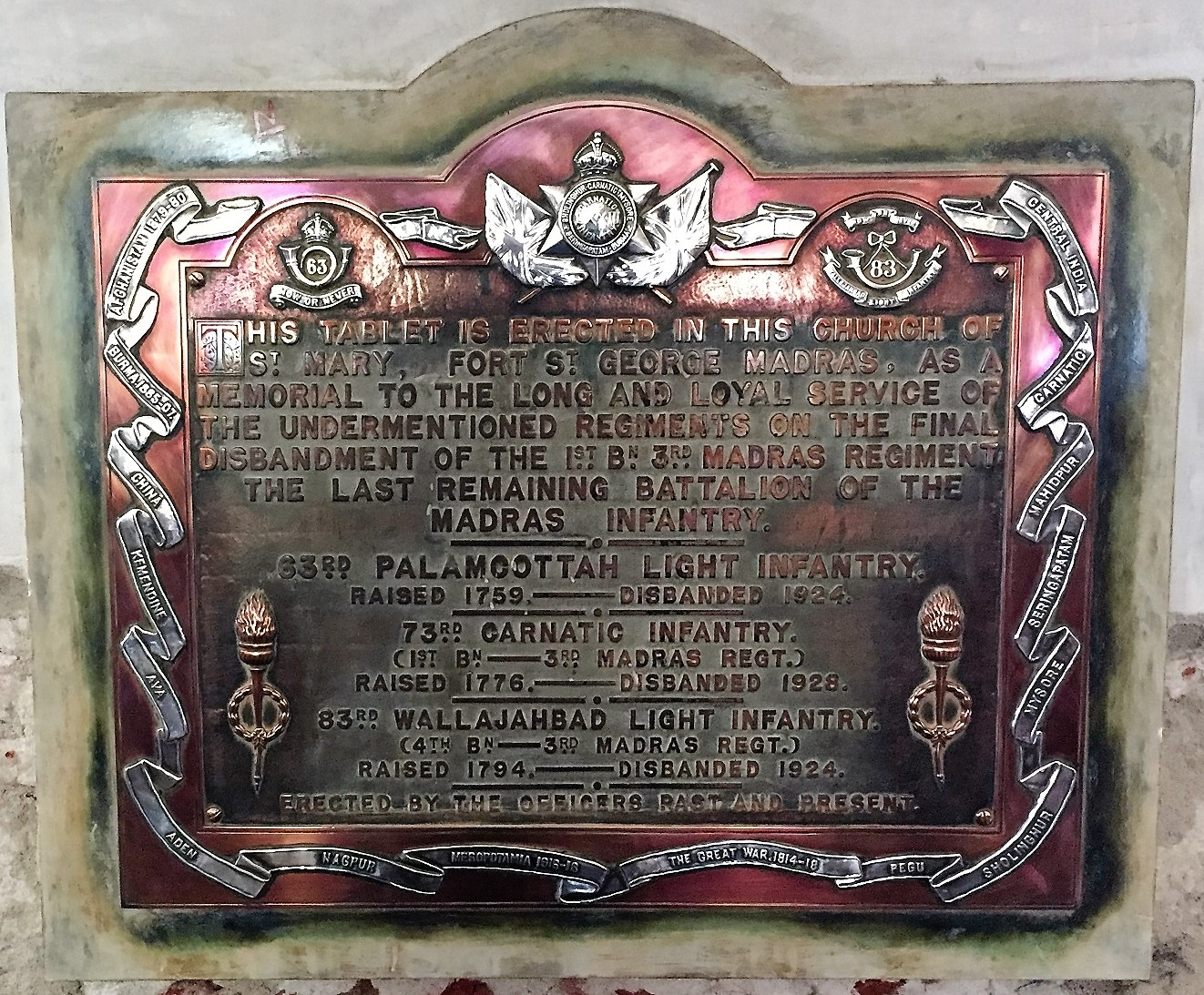
Colours of the 63rd Palamcottah Light Infantry, 83rd Wallajahbad Light Infantry and 73rd Carnatic Infantry, buried at St. Mary's Church, Madras

The 63rd Palamcottah Light Infantry was an infantry regiment of the British Indian Army. The regiment could trace its origins to 1759, when it was raised as the 4th Battalion Coast Sepoys.

== History ==
One of the oldest regiments in the British Indian Army, the Palamcottah Light Infantry took part in the Carnatic Wars, the Battle of Sholinghur in the Second Anglo-Maratha War, the Battle of Mahidpur in the Third Anglo-Mysore War, and the Battle of Ava in the Second Anglo-Burmese War. They were then sent to China as part of the British Empire forces that took part in suppressing the Boxer Rebellion, although without seeing active service.

=== Recruitment basis ===
After 1902 the basis of recruitment for most of the Madras regiments of the Indian Army shifted to the "martial races" of the Punjab and other northern regions. The Palamcottah Light Infantry however continued to be recruited in southern India. In 1914 four of its eight companies were Madrasi Muslims, two were Tamils and the remainder Parayans and Christian Madrasis. The regiment had about 13 British officers and 17 Indian officers. The India Army List dated October 1914 records the 63rd Light Infantry as sharing a regimental centre at Trichinopoly with the 61st Pioneers, the 64th Pioneers and the 83rd Light Infantry. Under the system of "linked battalions" in force at the time the 63rd shared recruits with any of the other regiments listed, according to individual unit needs.

=== World War I ===
During World War I the regiment initially remained in India on internal security duties as part of the 5th (Mhow) Division. In October 1914 the Palamcottah Light Infantry moved to British East Africa as part of the Indian Expeditionary Force B. It was part of the British landing force defeated by German colonial troops at the Battle of Tanga. At an early stage in the landing the regiment disintegrated when it came under heavy fire from the 6th Field Company of German askaris. Of 762 officers and men present at Tanga, the 63rd Light Infantry lost 85 killed, wounded and missing. It spent the remainder of the War on lines of communication service in East Africa before returning to India.

=== Disbandment ===
After World War I the Indian Army was restructured with the infantry moving from single battalion regiments to multi-battalion regiments. Following the allocation of individual battalions to the twenty new "large" regiments the nine remaining single battalion regiments were disbanded. These included the 63rd Palamcottah Light Infantry, which ceased to exist on 13 September 1922.

== Lineage ==
- 4th Battalion Coast Sepoys - 1759
- 4th Carnatic Battalion - 1769
- 3rd Carnatic Battalion - 1779
- 3rd Madras Battalion - 1784
- 1st Battalion, 3rd Madras Native Infantry - 1796
- 3rd Madras Native Infantry (Palamcottah Light Infantry) - 1812
- 3rd Madras Native Light Infantry - 1885
- 63rd (Palamcottah) Madras Light Infantry - 1901
- 63rd Palamcottah Light Infantry - 1903

== Insignia and Uniform ==
The Palamcottah Light Infantry had the usual bugle horn badge of light infantry regiments, in brass with the number 63 in the curl of the bugle and a crown above. The full dress uniform worn in 1910 included a scarlet "zouave" style tunic with emerald green facings and dark blue breeches. Turban and puttees were khaki.

== Sources ==
- Barthorp, Michael; Burn, Jeffrey (1979). Indian infantry regiments 1860-1914. Osprey Publishing. ISBN 0-85045-307-0.
- Rinaldi, Richard A (2008). Order of Battle British Army 1914. Ravi Rikhye. ISBN 978-0-9776072-8-0.
- Sumner, Ian (2001). The Indian Army 1914-1947. Osprey Publishing. ISBN 1-84176-196-6.
- Moberly, Frederick James (1927) [1923]. The Campaign in Mesopotamia 1914–1918. History of the Great War Based on Official Documents. Vol. I. London: HMSO. OCLC 772784341.
