= 73rd Carnatic Infantry =

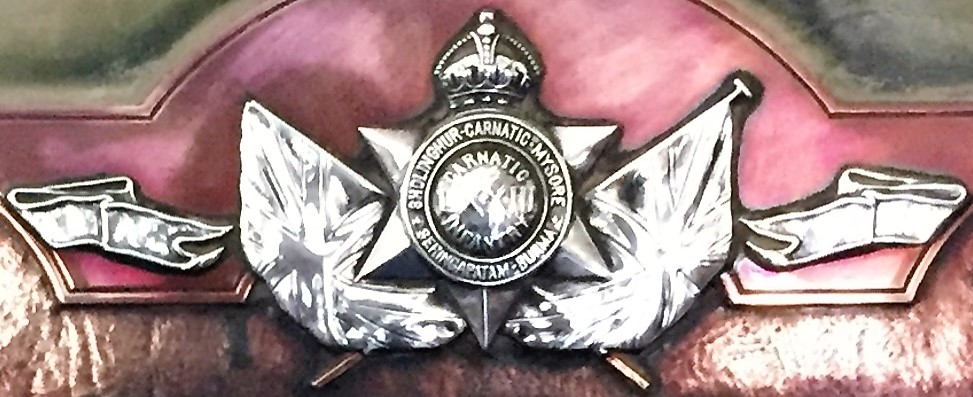
- Insignia of the 73rd Carnatic Infantry
- Active: 1759-1922
- Country: Indian Empire
- Branch: Army
- Type: Infantry
- Part of: Madras Army (to 1895); Madras Command
- Colors: Red; faced white
- Engagements: Second Anglo-Mysore War; Third Burmese War; World War I

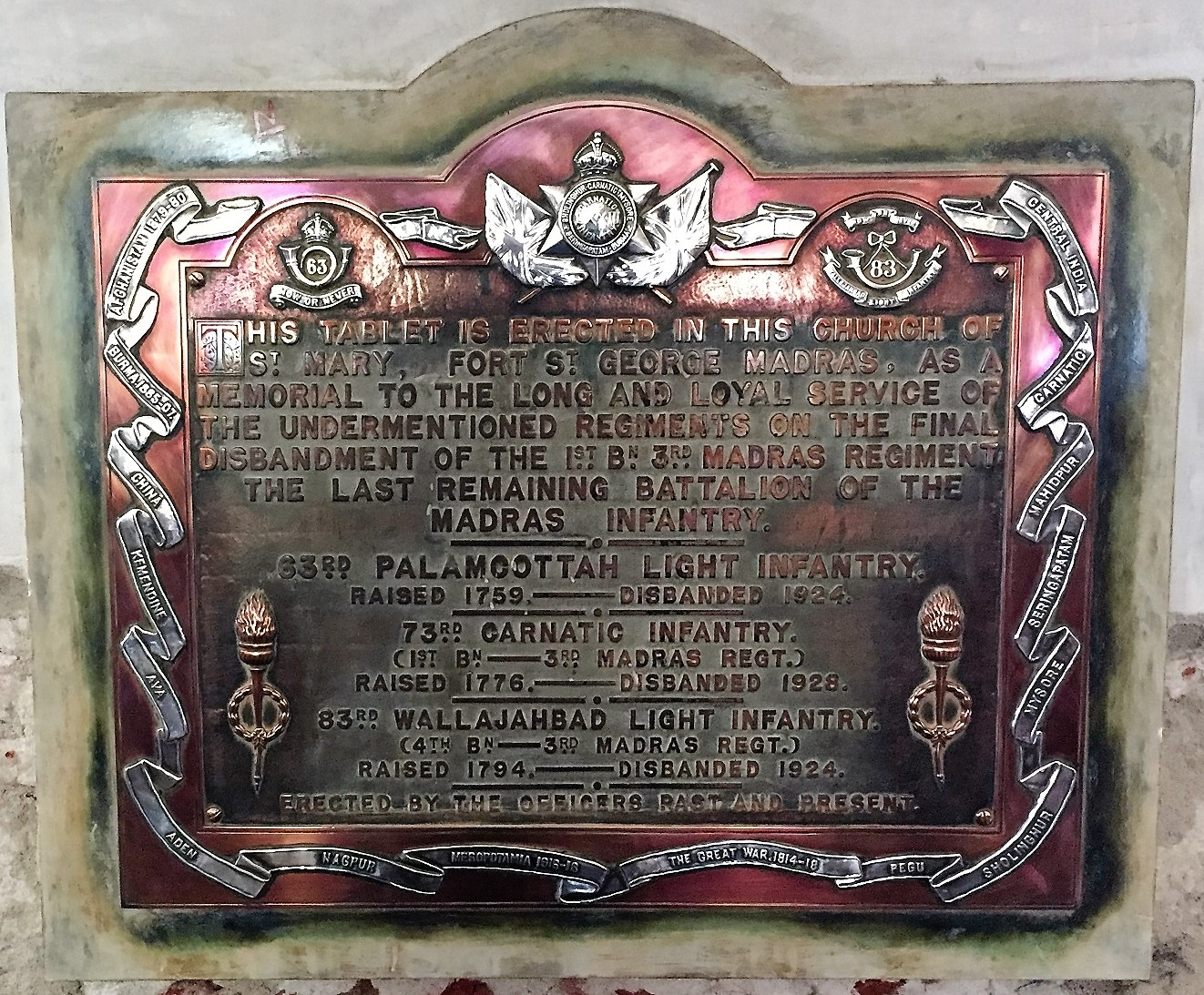
Colours of the 63rd Palamcottah Light Infantry, 83rd Wallajahbad Light Infantry and 73rd Carnatic Infantry, buried at St. Mary's Church, Madras

The 73rd Carnatic Infantry was an infantry regiment originally raised in 1776 as the 13th Carnatic Battalion (using drafts of men from the 4th, 7th and the 11th Carnatic Battalion) as part of the Presidency of Madras Army which was itself part of the Honourable East India Company Army. The presidency armies, like the presidencies themselves, belonged to the East India Company until the Government of India Act 1858 (passed in the aftermath of the Indian Rebellion of 1857) transferred all three presidencies to the direct authority of the British Crown. In 1903 all three presidency armies were merged into the British Indian Army. The unit was transferred to the Indian Army upon Indian Independence.

== History ==
The regiment's first action was in 1781, during the Battle of Sholinghur and the Battle of Seringapatam in the Second Anglo-Mysore War in 1781. They had to wait just over 100 years for their next action which was during the Third Anglo-Burmese War in 1885.

During World War I, they remained in India on training and internal security duties attached to the 9th (Secunderabad) Division.

After World War I the Indian government reformed the army moving from single battalion regiments to multi battalion regiments. In 1922, the 73rd Carnatic Infantry became the 1st Battalion, 3rd Madras Regiment. After independence they were one of the regiments allocated to the Indian Army.

== Present Day ==
Today the battalion is the 1st Battalion, Mechanised Infantry Regiment of the Indian Army.

== Changes in designation ==
- 13th Carnatic Battalion - 1776
- 13th Madras Battalion - 1784
- 2nd Battalion, 3rd Madras Native Infantry - 1796
- 13th Madras Native Infantry - 1824
- 13th Madras Infantry - 1885
- 73rd Carnatic Infantry - 1903
- 1st Battalion, 3rd Madras Regiment - 1922
- 1st Battalion, the Madras Regiment - 1947
- 1st Battalion, the Mechanised Infantry Regiment - 1979

== Sources ==
- Barthorp, Michael; Burn, Jeffrey (1979). Indian infantry regiments 1860-1914. Osprey Publishing. ISBN 0-85045-307-0.
- Rinaldi, Richard A (2008). Order of Battle British Army 1914. Ravi Rikhye. ISBN 978-0-9776072-8-0.
- Sharma, Gautam (1990). Valour and sacrifice: famous regiments of the Indian Army. Allied Publishers. ISBN 81-7023-140-X.
- Sumner, Ian (2001). The Indian Army 1914-1947. Osprey Publishing. ISBN 1-84176-196-6.
- Moberly, Frederick James (1927) [1923]. The Campaign in Mesopotamia 1914–1918. History of the Great War Based on Official Documents. Vol. I. London: HMSO. OCLC 772784341.
