= 32nd Indian Armoured Division =

Armoured division of the Indian Army during World War II

The 32nd Indian Armoured Division was an armoured division of the Indian Army during World War II. It was formed in April 1941 as the 2nd Armoured Division and renamed the 32nd in December. It never saw any combat and was broken up to form the 44th Armoured Division in February 1943.

== Formation ==
=== 254th Indian Tank Brigade ===
- 7th Light Cavalry
- 25th Dragoons
- 46th Cavalry

=== 255th Indian Tank Brigade ===
- 26th Hussars
- 45th Cavalry
- 4/4th Bombay Grenadiers
- 158th Regiment RAC
- 159th Regiment RAC
- 5th King Edward's Own Probyn's Horse
- 9th Royal Deccan Horse
- 116th Regiment RAC
- 19th King George's Own Lancers

=== 73rd Indian Infantry Brigade ===
The brigade was formed in July 1942, at Poona in India. The brigade was supposed to be the infantry brigade component of the 32nd Indian Armoured Division, but was disbanded in April 1943, when the armoured division was disbanded.

- 14/15th Punjab Regiment
- 15/7th Rajput Regiment
- 15/10th Baluch Regiment

=== Divisional troops ===
- 7th Anti Tank Regiment, Indian Artillery
- 123rd Field Regiment, Royal Artillery
- 33rd Field Squadron, Indian Engineers (IE)
- 36th Field Squadron, IE
- 40th Field Park Squadron, IE
