= British Indian Army =

1895–1947 military force

Indian Army
- The Union Flag, flown as the King's Colour by Indian regiments. A central emblem denoted each unit.
- Active: 1 April 1895 – 15 August 1947
- Country: India
- Allegiance: British Empire
- Type: Army
- Size: World War I: c. 1,500,000; World War II: c. 2,500,000 (Total serving during each conflict)
- Headquarters: GHQ India
- Engagements: First Mohmand Campaign; Boxer Rebellion; Tirah campaign British expedition to Tibet; Mahdist War; First World War; Third Anglo-Afghan War; Waziristan campaign (1919–1920); Waziristan campaign (1936–1939); Second World War; North-West Frontier (1858–1947); Indonesian National Revolution (1946)

Commanders
- Notable commanders: Lord Roberts; Lord Kitchener; Sir William Birdwood; Sir William Slim; Sir Claude Auchinleck; Sir Edward Quinan; Sir William Lockhart

The Indian Army during British rule, also referred to as the British Indian Army, was the main military force of India until national independence in 1947. Formed in 1895 by uniting the three Presidency armies, it was responsible for the defence of both the British Raj and the princely states, which could also have their own armies. As stated in The Imperial Gazetteer of India, the "British Government has undertaken to protect the dominions of the Native princes from invasion and even from rebellion within: its army is organized for the defence not merely of British India, but of all possessions under the suzerainty of the King-Emperor." The Indian Army was a vital part of the British Empire's military forces, especially in World War I and World War II.

The Indian Presidency armies were originally under East India Company command, and comprised the Bengal Army, Madras Army, and Bombay Army. After the Indian Rebellion of 1857, all company troops were transferred to the British Crown. In 1879, the Presidency armies were integrated into a system of four Commands with a central Commander-in-Chief. On 1 April 1895, the Presidency armies were dissolved and unified into a single Indian Army, also divided into four Commands, and the term "Indian Army" was officially used by 1903. (Note: Initially, the force was named the "Army of the Government of India") The Commands were later replaced by two "Armies" in 1908—the Northern and Southern Army—but the Command system was restored in 1920. (Note: The commands were: Northern Command, Eastern Command, Western Command, and Southern Command)

About 1.5 million Indian soldiers served during the First World War. The Indian Expeditionary Forces deployed to France, Belgium, east Africa, Iraq, Egypt, and the Gallipoli peninsula, among other regions. Eleven Indian soldiers won the Victoria Cross in the war. During the Second World War some 2.5 million soldiers served, and the Indian Army became the largest volunteer army in history to that point. India itself also served as a key logistical base for Allied operations in World War II.

The force is also sometimes referred to as the Army of the Indian Empire, or Imperial Indian Army. The Indian Army should not be confused with the Army of India, which was the Indian Army plus the British Army in India (British units sent to India). With the partition of India and Pakistan into two new Dominions on 15 August 1947, the army was reconstituted and divided between the newly independent countries, with the process overseen by the last Commander-in-Chief, India, Field Marshal Sir Claude Auchinleck. Independent India would, however, retain "much of the organizing framework" of the army.

== History ==
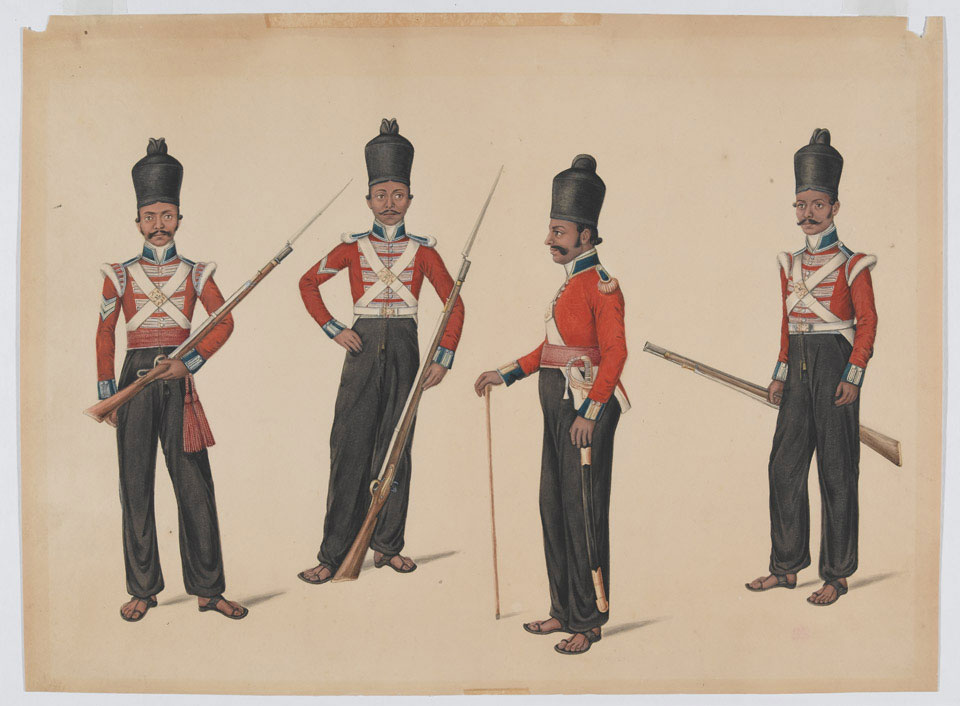
c. 1835 painting of the 40th Regiment of Madras Native Infantry

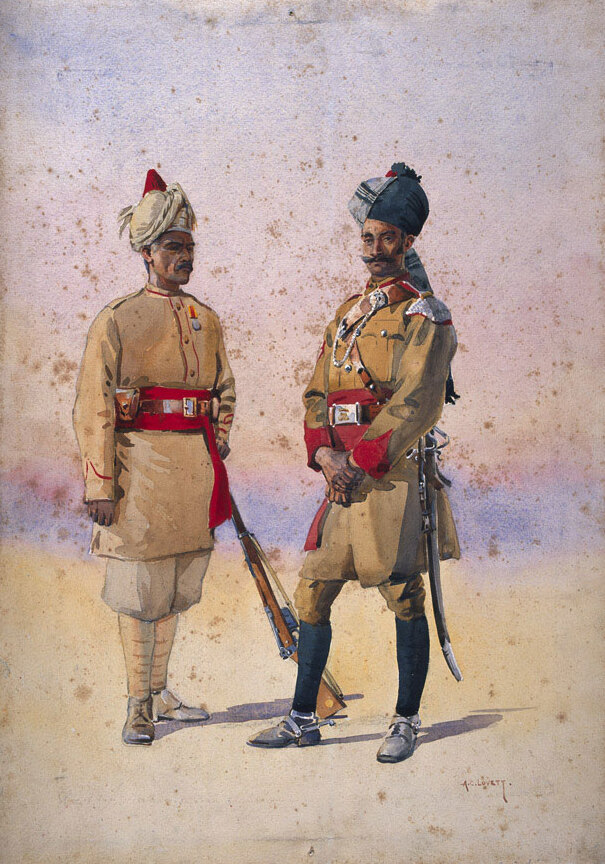
c. 1908 illustration of the Corps of Guides

The Indian Army has its origins in the years after the Indian Rebellion of 1857, often called the Indian Mutiny in British histories, when in 1858 the Crown took over direct rule of British India from the East India Company. Before 1858, the precursor units of the Indian Army were units controlled by the Company and were paid for by their profits. These operated alongside units of the British Army, funded by the British government in London.

The three Presidency armies remained separate forces, each with its own Commander-in-Chief. Overall operational control was exercised by the Commander-in-Chief of the Bengal Army, who was formally the Commander-in-Chief of the East Indies. From 1861, most of the officer manpower was pooled in the three Presidential Staff Corps. After the Second Afghan War a Commission of Enquiry recommended the abolition of the presidency armies. The Ordnance, Supply and Transport, and Pay branches were by then unified.

The Punjab Frontier Force was under the direct control of the Lieutenant-Governor of the Punjab during peacetime until 1886, when it came under the Commander-in-Chief, India. The Hyderabad Contingent and other local corps remained under direct governmental control. Standing higher formations—divisions and brigades—were abandoned in 1889. No divisional staffs were maintained in peacetime, and troops were dispersed throughout the sub-continent, with internal security as their main function. In 1891 the three staff corps were merged into one Indian Staff Corps.

Two years later the Madras and Bombay armies lost their posts of Commander-in-Chief. In 1895, the Presidency Armies were abolished and the Indian Army created thereby was grouped into four commands: Bengal, Madras (including Burma), Bombay (including Sind, Quetta, and Aden), and the Punjab (including the North-West Frontier and the Punjab Frontier Force). Each was under the command of a lieutenant general, who answered directly to the C-in-C, India.

The Presidency armies were abolished with effect from 1 April 1895 by a notification of the Government of India through Army Department Order Number 981 dated 26 October 1894, unifying the three Presidency armies into a single Indian Army. The armies were amalgamated into four commands, Northern, Southern, Eastern, and Western. The Indian Army, like the Presidency armies, continued to provide armed support to the civil authorities, both in combating banditry and in case of riots and rebellion. One of the first external operations the new unified army faced was the 1899 to 1901 Boxer Rebellion in China. The 1st, 4th, and 14th Sikhs; 3rd Madras Native Infantry, 4th Goorkas, 22nd and 30th Bombay Native Infantry, 24th Punjab Infantry, 1st Madras Pioneers, No. 2 Company Bombay Sappers, No. 3 Company Madras Sappers, No. 4 Company Bengal Sappers, and the 1st Bengal Lancers, among other Indian units, all served during the Rebellion. Numerous Indian soldiers earned the China War Medal 1900 with the "Relief of Pekin" clasp for contributing to the relief of Peking and the International Legations from 10 June to 14 August 1900.

=== Kitchener reforms ===
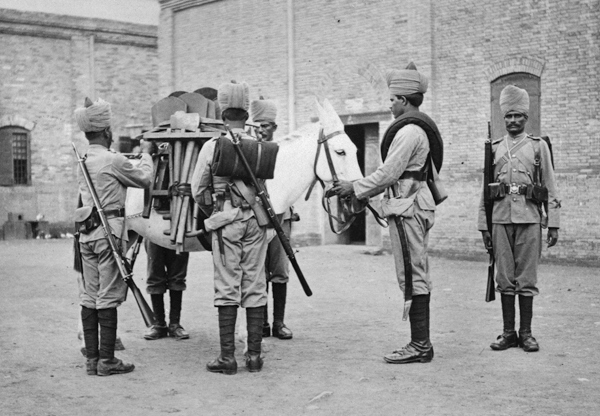
No. 2 Company of the Bombay Sappers and Miners during the Boxer Rebellion, China, 1900.

The Kitchener reforms began in 1903 when Lord Kitchener of Khartoum, newly appointed Commander-in-Chief, India, completed the unification of the three former Presidency armies, and also the Punjab Frontier Force, the Hyderabad Contingent and other local forces, into one Indian Army.

The principles underlying the reforms were that the defence of the North-West Frontier against foreign aggression was the army's primary role and that all units were to have training and experience in that role on that frontier. Furthermore, the army's organisation should be the same in peace as in war, and maintaining internal security was for the army a secondary role, in support of the Indian Imperial Police.

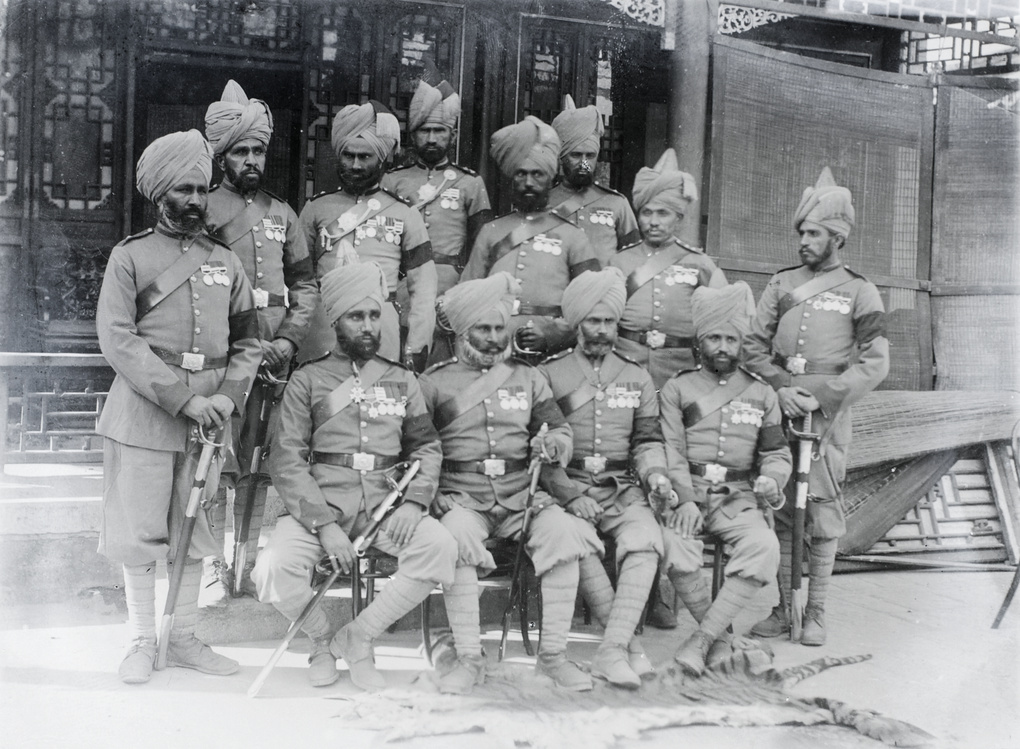
Indian Army soldiers, including men from the 3rd Sikh regiment and 1st Sikh Infantry, Punjab Frontier Force, in Beijing, c. 1900.

Lord Kitchener found the army scattered across the country in stations at brigade or regimental strength, and in effect, providing garrisons for most of the major cities. The reformed Indian Army was to be stationed in operational formations and concentrated in the north of the subcontinent. The Commander-in-Chief's plan called for nine fighting divisions grouped in two corps commands on the main axes through the North-West Frontier. Five divisions were to be grouped on the Lucknow–Peshawar–Khyber axis, and four divisions on the Bombay–Mhow–Quetta axis. However, the cost of abandoning some thirty-four stations and building new ones in the proposed corps areas was considered prohibitive, and that aspect of the plan had to be modified.

Under the compromise adopted in 1905, the four existing commands were reduced to three, and together with Army Headquarters, arranged in ten standing divisions and four independent brigades. The commands comprised: Northern Command, which consisted of the 1st (Peshawar) Division, the 2nd (Rawalpindi) Division, the 3rd (Lahore) Division, the Kohat Brigade, the Bannu Brigade, and the Derajat Brigade; Western Command, which consisted of the 4th (Quetta) Division, the 5th (Mhow) Division, the 6th (Poona) Division, and the Aden Brigade, located in Aden in the Arabian Peninsula; and Eastern Command, which consisted of the 7th (Meerut) Division and the 8th (Lucknow) Division.

Army Headquarters retained the 9th (Secunderabad) Division and the Burma Division under its direct control. The numbered divisions were organised so that on mobilisation they could deploy a complete infantry division, a cavalry brigade, and a number of troops for internal security or local frontier defence. Permanent divisional commands were formed with an establishment of staff officers under a major general.

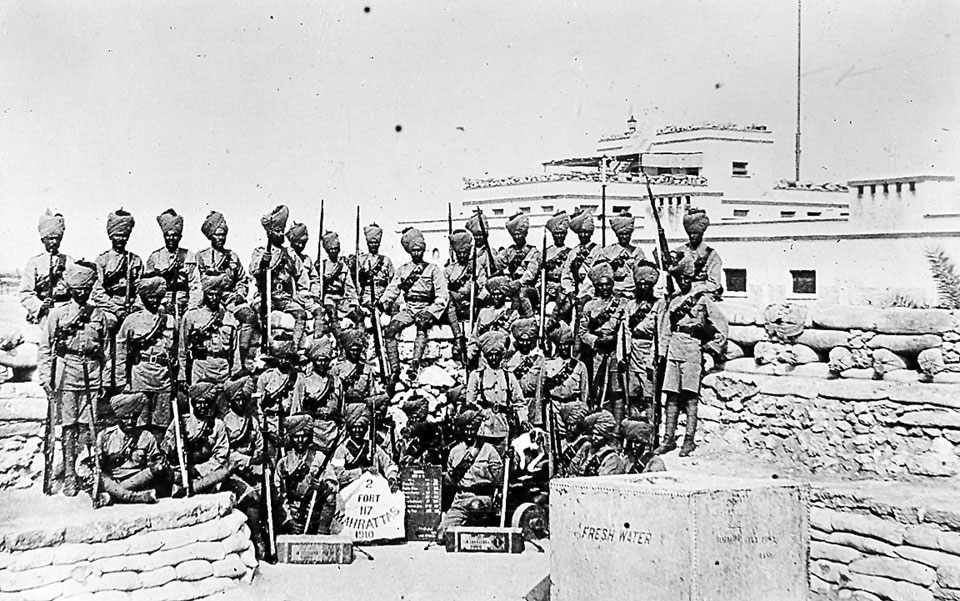
117th Mahrattas at a fort in the North West Frontier, British India, 1909

After the reforms ended in 1909, the Indian Army was organised along British lines, although it was always behind in terms of equipment. An Indian Army division consisted of three brigades each of four battalions. Three of these battalions were of the Indian Army, and one British. The Indian battalions were often segregated, with companies of different tribes, castes or religions. One and a half million volunteers came forward from the estimated population of 315 million in the Indian subcontinent.

Regimental battalions were not permanently allocated to particular divisions or brigades, but instead spent some years in one formation, and were then posted to another elsewhere. This rotating arrangement was intended both to provide all units with experience of active service on the Frontier, and to prevent them becoming 'localised' in static regimental stations. In contrast, the divisional locations remained constant.

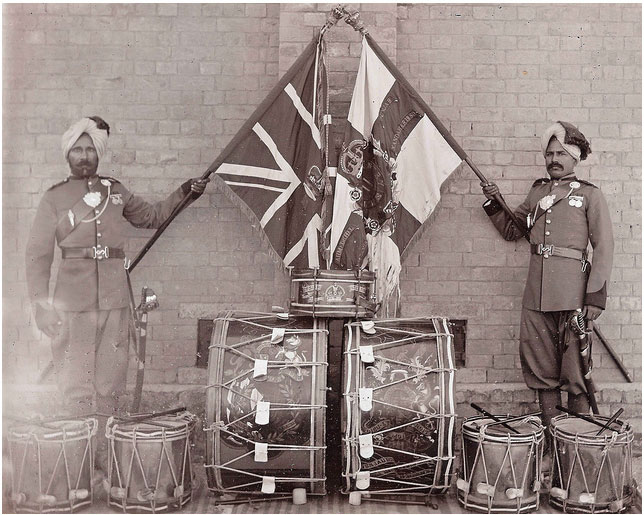
Flag party of the 52nd Sikhs (Frontier Force) at Kohat, with their regimental colours in 1905

==== Redesignating the regiments ====
To emphasise that there was now only one Indian Army, and that all units were to be trained and deployed without regard for their regional origins, the regiments were renumbered into single sequences of cavalry, artillery, infantry of the line, and Gurkha Rifles. Regimental designations were altered to remove all references to the former Presidency Armies. Where appropriate subsidiary titles recalling other identifying details were adopted. Thus the 2nd Bengal Lancers became the 2nd Lancers (Gardner's Horse).

The new order began with the Bengal regiments, followed by the Punjab Frontier Force, then the regiments of Madras, the Hyderabad Contingent, and Bombay. Wherever possible a significant digit was retained in the new number. Thus the 1st Sikh Infantry became the 51st Sikhs, the 1st Madras Pioneers became the 61st Pioneers, and the 1st Bombay Grenadiers became the 101st Grenadiers.

The Gurkha Regiments had developed into their own Line of rifle regiments since 1861. They were five of these until they were joined by the former 42nd, 43rd, & 44th Gurkha Regiments of the Bengal Army, who became the 6th, 7th, & 8th Gurkha Rifles. The numbers 42, 43, & 44 were allocated respectively to the Deoli and Erinpura Irregular Forces and the Mhairwara Battalion from Rajputana.

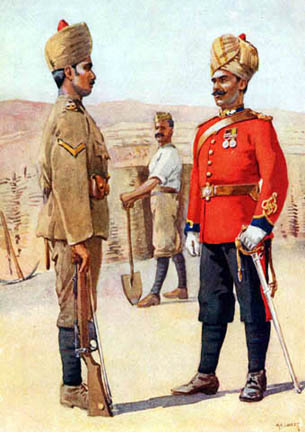
Soldiers of the 3rd Sappers and Miners. Illustration by Maj. A. C. Lovett, published 1911.

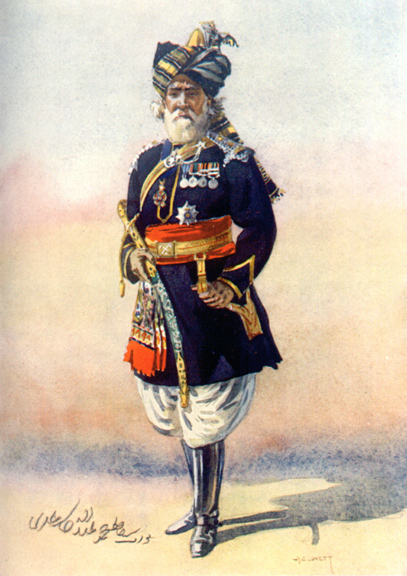
Officer of the 15th Lancers (Cureton's Multanis), painted by Maj. A. C. Lovett. The regiment served in France during the 1914 Winter Operations.

The mountain batteries had already lost their numbers two years earlier. Under the 1903 reforms they were renumbered with twenty added to their original numbers. The army had very little artillery (only 12 batteries of mountain artillery), and Royal Indian Artillery batteries were attached to the divisions. The Indian Army Corps of Engineers was formed by the Group of Madras, Bengal and Bombay Sappers in their respective presidencies.

The Corps of Guides composed of cavalry squadrons and infantry companies, was renamed the Queen's Own Corps of Guides (Lumsden's) but stayed numberless. The new regimental numbering and namings were notified in India Army Order 181, dated 2 October 1903.

In 1903 the title of the Indian Staff Corps was abolished, and thereafter officers were simply appointed to 'the Indian Army.' A General Staff was then created to deal with overall military policy, supervision of training in peacetime, conduct of operations in war, distribution of forces for internal security or external deployment, plans for future operations and collecting intelligence. Functions were divided along British lines into two branches; the Adjutant-General, dealing with training, discipline, and personnel, and the Quartermaster-General, dealing with supplies, accommodation, and communications. In 1906 a General Branch was established to deal with military policy, organisation and deployment, mobilisation and war plans, and intelligence and the conduct of operations. The Chiefs of the staff branches answered to the Chief of the General Staff, whose post was held by a Lieutenant-General. To provide training for staff officers, the Indian Staff College was established in 1905, and permanently based at Quetta from 1907.

With no intermediate chain of command, army headquarters was weighed down with minor administrative details. Divisional commanders were responsible not only for their active formations, but also for internal security and volunteer troops within their respective areas. On mobilisation, divisional staffs took the field, leaving no-one to maintain the local administration. Supporting services were insufficient, and many troops intended for the field force were not moved from their old stations into the areas of their new divisional command. These defects became clear during the First World War, and lead to further reorganisation.

The Indian Army Act 1911 legislated the replacement of the Indian Articles of War 1869. It was passed by the Governor General. It was under aspects of this law that the Army charged defendants during the Indian National Army Trials in 1945. It was replaced by the "Indian Army Act, 1950" after partition and independence.

=== First World War ===
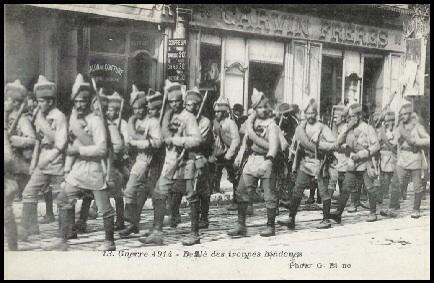
Indian soldiers, France, World War I

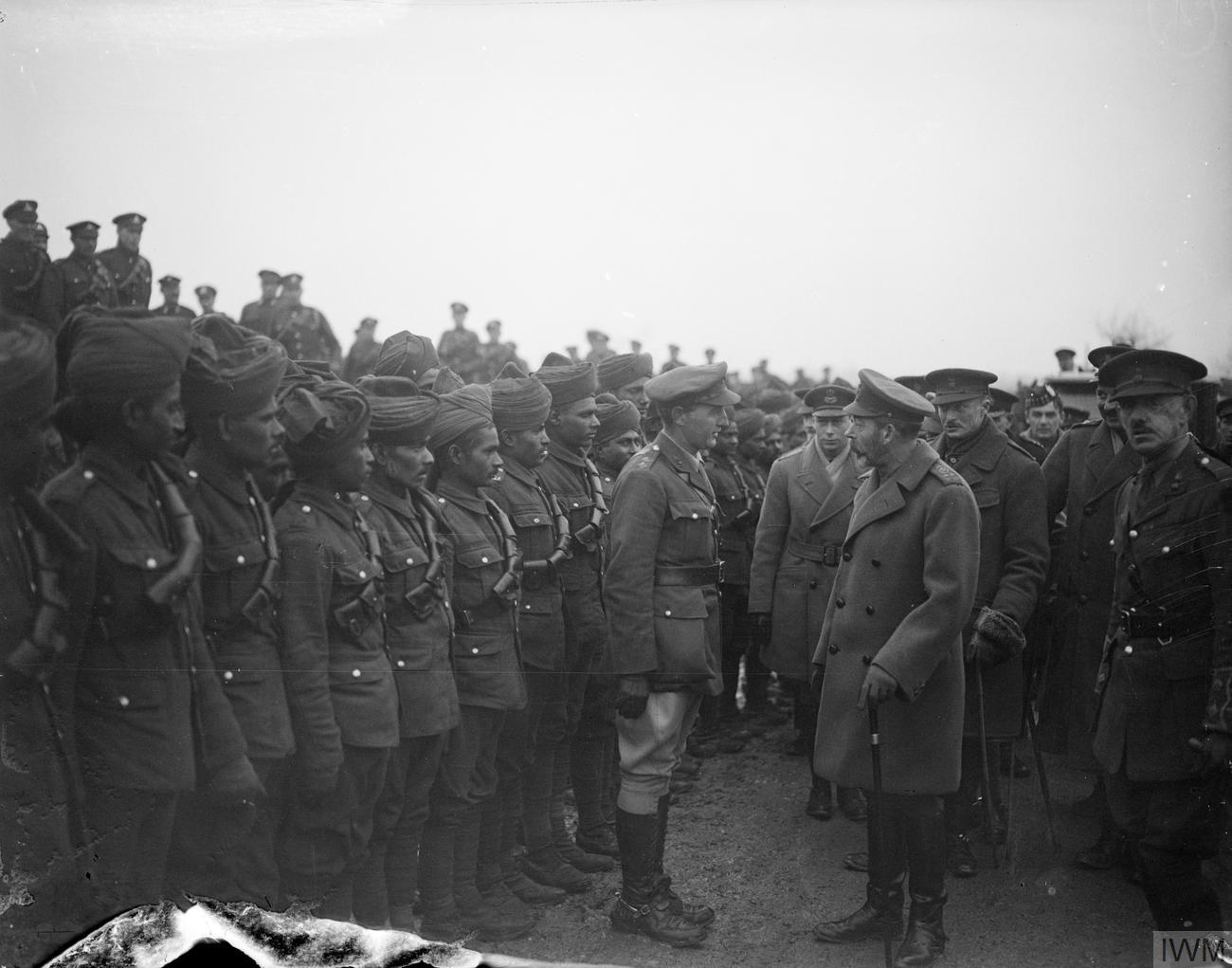
King George V inspects Indian troops attached to the Royal Garrison Artillery at Le Cateau, 2 December 1918

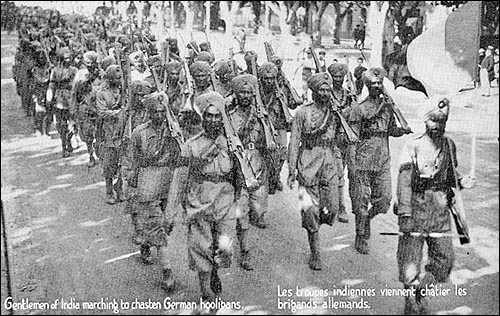
The 15th Sikh Regiment arrive in Marseille, France, on their way to fight the Germans during the First World War. The post card reads, "Gentlemen of India marching to chasten German hooligans"

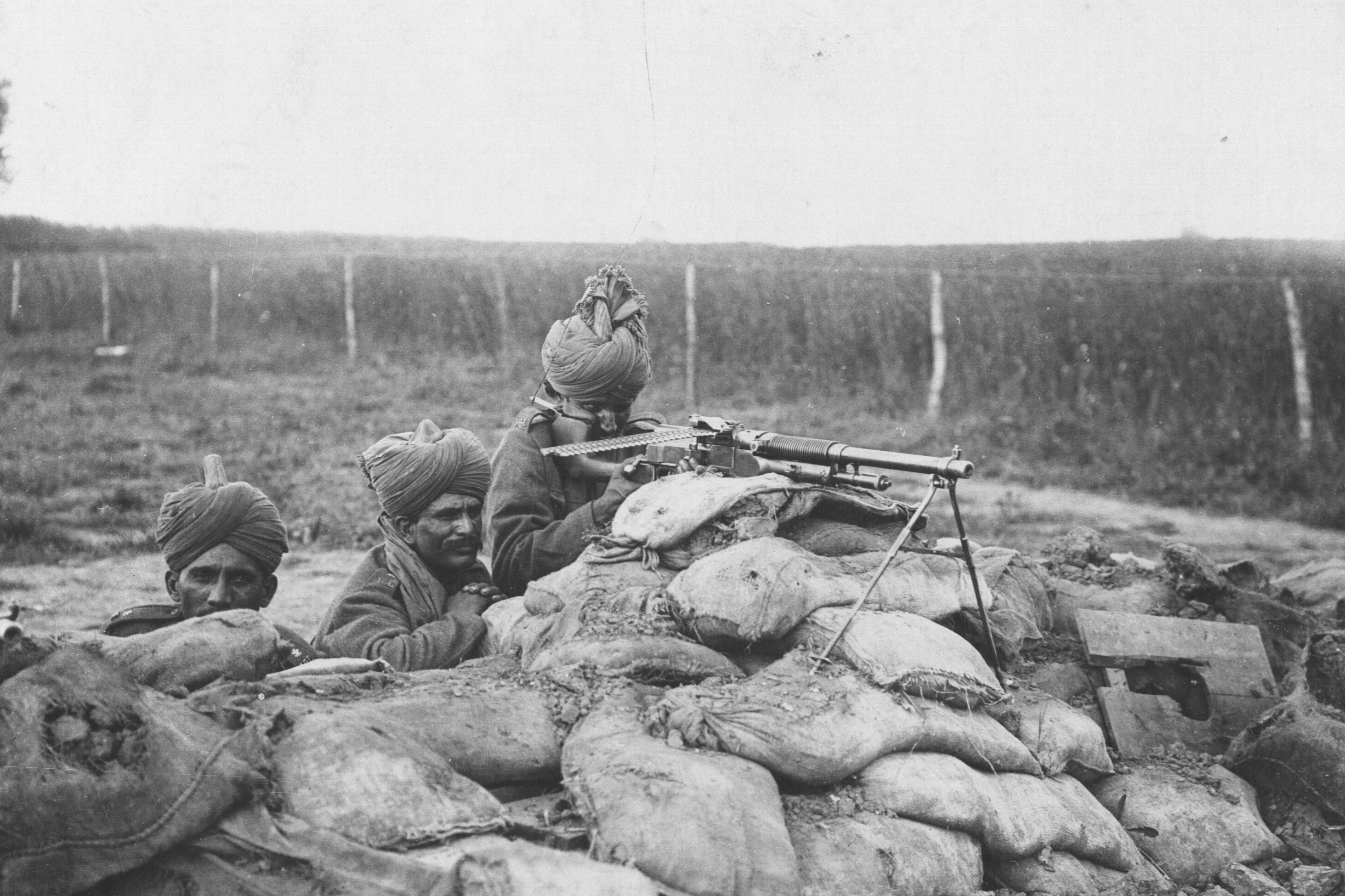
A Benét–Mercié machine gun section of 2nd Rajput Light Infantry in action in Flanders, during the winter of 1914–15

Prior to the outbreak of the First World War, the strength of the British Indian Army was 215,000. Either in 1914 or before, a ninth division had been formed, the 9th (Secunderabad) Division. By November 1918, the Indian Army rose in size to 573,000 men.

Before the war, the Indian government had decided that India could afford to provide two infantry divisions and a cavalry brigade in the event of a European war. Some 140,000 soldiers saw active service on the Western Front in France and Belgium – 90,000 in the front-line Indian Corps, and some 50,000 in auxiliary battalions. They felt that any more would jeopardise national security. More than four divisions were eventually sent as Indian Expeditionary Force A formed the Indian Corps and the Indian Cavalry Corps that arrived on the Western Front in 1914. The high number of officer casualties the corps suffered early on had an effect on its later performance. British officers that understood the language, customs, and psychology of their men could not be quickly replaced, and the alien environment of the Western Front had some effect on the soldiers. However, the feared unrest in India never happened, and while the Indian Corps was transferred to the Middle East in 1915 India provided many more divisions for active service during the course of the war. Indians' first engagement was on the Western Front within a month of the start of the war, at the First Battle of Ypres. In October/November 1914, the Baluchis of the 129th Duke of Connaught's Own, the first Indian contingent to be in contact with Germans at Hollebeke (and the only to inscribe 'Ypres 1914'), the sepoy Khudadad Khan maintaining the position until gravely wounded became the first Indian to win a Victoria Cross (Indians were eligible from 1911). In November, after a retreat, a scout section of the 1st Battalion 39th Garhwal Rifles under the leadership of Naik Darwan Singh Negi, then badly injured, reinvested lost trenches. For his gallantry he received the second VC.

Nearly 700,000 troops then served in the Middle East, fighting against the Ottoman Empire in the Mesopotamian campaign. There they were short of transportation for resupply and operated in extremely hot and dusty conditions. Led by Major General Sir Charles Townshend, they pushed on to capture Baghdad but they were repulsed by Ottoman forces at the Siege of Kut.

As the war continued the Indian Army continued to see extensive service, including on the Western Front, notably in the Battle of Neuve Chapelle, participated in the Battle of Gallipoli and Sinai and Palestine Campaign. It also campaigned in East Africa, including the Battle of Tanga.

Participants from the Indian subcontinent won 13,000 medals, including 12 Victoria Crosses. By the end of the war a total of 47,746 Indians had been reported dead or missing; 65,126 were wounded.

Also serving in the First World War were so-called "Imperial Service Troops", provided by the semi-autonomous Princely States. About 21,000 were raised in the First World War, mainly consisting of Sikhs of Punjab and Rajputs from Rajputana (such as the Bikaner Camel Corps and the Hyderabad, Mysore and Jodhpur Lancers of the Imperial Service Cavalry Brigade). These forces played a prominent role in the Sinai and Palestine Campaign.

=== Interbellum (1918–1939) ===
Elements of the Army operated around Mary, Turkmenistan in 1918–19. See Malleson mission and Entente intervention in the Russian Civil War. The army then took part in the Third Anglo-Afghan War of 1919. In the aftermath of the First World War, the Indian Territorial Force and Auxiliary Force (India) were created in the 1920s. The Indian Territorial Force was a part-time, paid, all-volunteer organisation within the army. Its units were primarily made up of European officers and Indian other ranks. The ITF was created by the Indian Territorial Force Act 1920 to replace the Indian section of the Indian Defence Force. It was an all-volunteer force modelled after the British Territorial Army. The European parallel to the ITF was the Auxiliary Force (India).

After the First World War the British started the process of Indianisation, by which Indians were promoted into higher officer ranks. In a 1923 census, the British Indian Army consisted of 64,669 British-born soldiers and officers, with 187,432 Indian-born soldiers in comparison. Indian cadets were sent to study in Great Britain at the Royal Military College, Sandhurst, and were given full commissions as King's Commissioned Indian Officers. The KCIOs were equivalent in every way to British commissioned officers and had full authority over British troops (unlike VCOs). Some KCIOs were attached to British Army units for a part of their careers.

In 1922, after wartime experience had shown that the maintenance of 130 separate single-battalion infantry regiments was unwieldy, a number of large (four to five battalion) regiments were created, and numerous cavalry regiments amalgamated. The List of regiments of the Indian Army (1922) shows the reduced number of larger regiments. Until 1932 most Indian Army officers, both British and Indian, were trained at the Royal Military College, Sandhurst, after that date the Indian officers increasingly received their training at the Indian Military Academy in Dehradun which was established that year.

=== Second World War ===
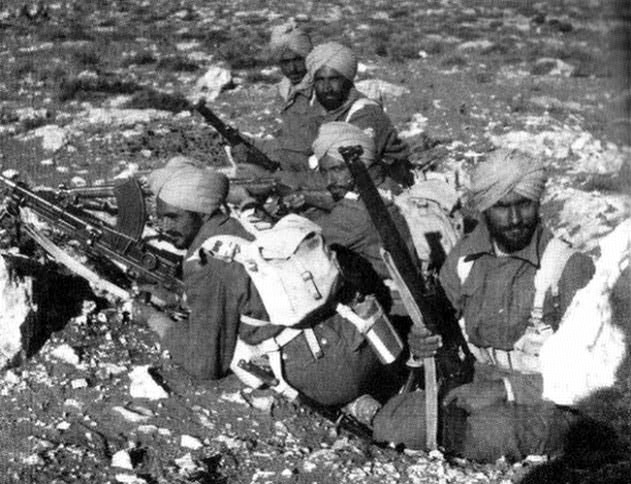
Indian Army Sikh personnel in action during the successful Operation Crusader in December 1941

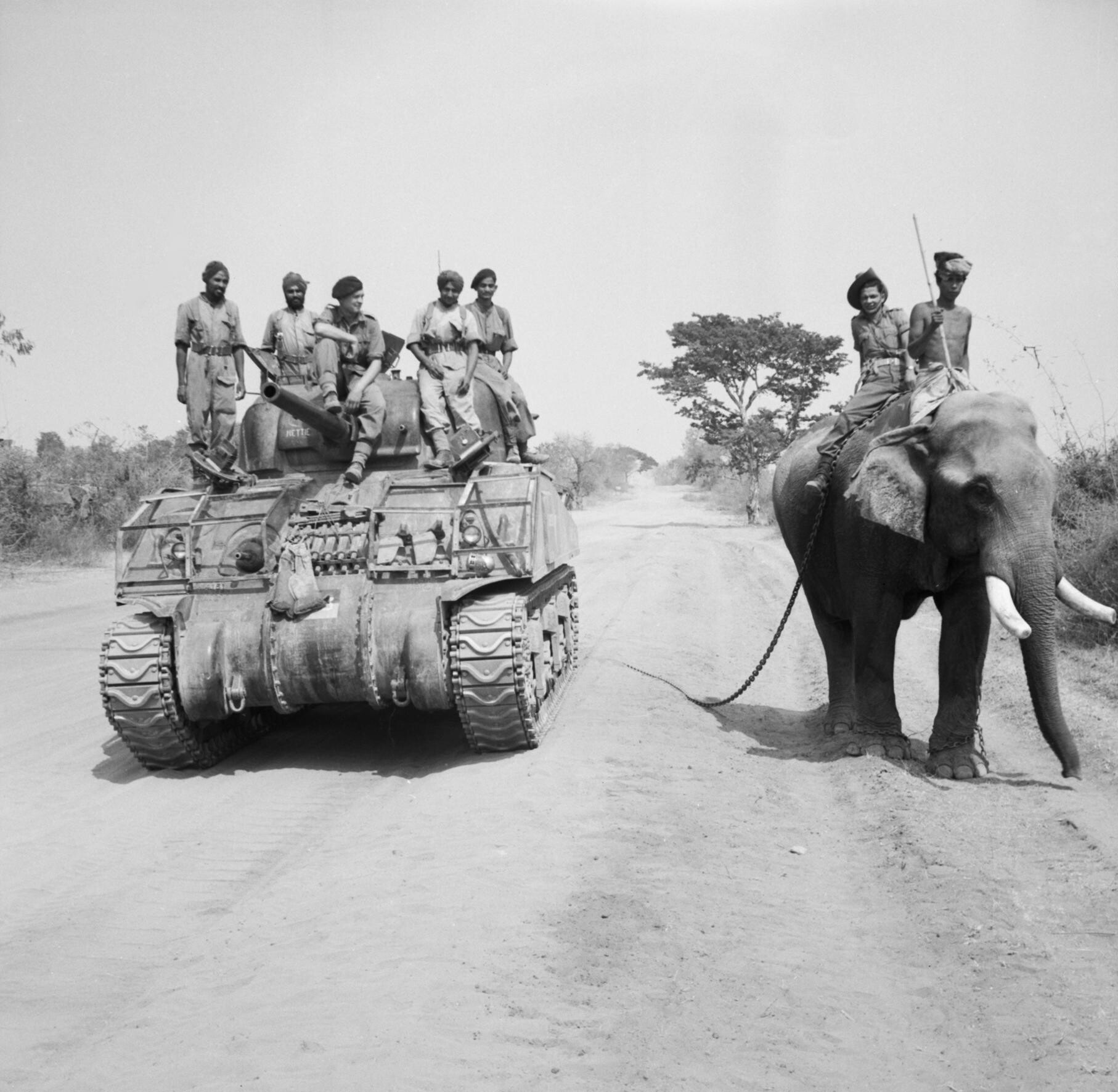
Sherman tank of the 9th Royal Deccan Horse, on the road to Meiktila, Burma, 29 March 1945.

At the outbreak of the Second World War, the Indian Army numbered 205,000 men and, as the war continued, this would rise to 2.5 million men to become the largest all–volunteer force in history. During this process, six corps would be raised; which consisted of the Indian III Corps, Indian IV Corps, Indian XV Corps, Indian XXI Corps (served with Tenth Army in the Middle East in 1942), Indian XXXIII Corps and Indian XXXIV Corps. Furthermore, the 2nd, 4th, 5th, 6th, 7th, 8th, 9th, 10th, 11th, 12th, 14th, 17th, 19th, 20th, 21st, 23rd, 25th, 26th, 34th, 36th (later converted to an all-British formation), and 39th Indian Divisions were formed, as well as other forces. Additionally there were at one time or another four armoured divisions formed (the 31st, 32nd, 43rd, and 44th), and one airborne division, also designated the 44th. In matters of administration, weapons, training, and equipment, the Indian Army had considerable independence; for example, prior to the war the Indian Army adopted the Vickers–Berthier (VB) light machine gun instead of the Bren gun of the British Army, while continuing to manufacture and issue the older SMLE No. 1 Mk III rifle during the Second World War, instead of the Lee–Enfield No.4 Mk I issued to the British Army from the middle of the war.

Particularly notable contributions of the Indian Army during that conflict were the:

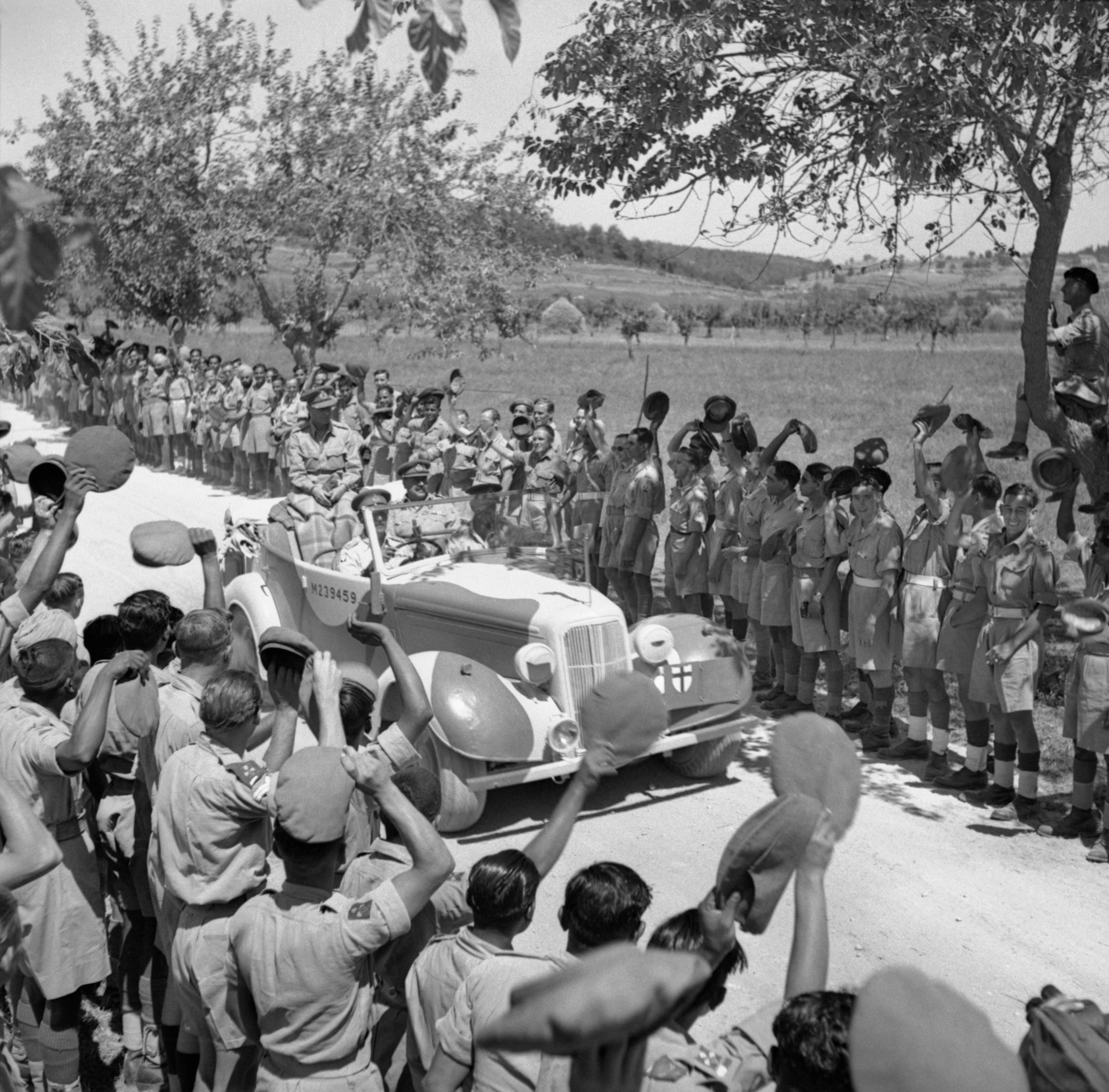
- King George VI rides past cheering Indian troops, on his way to award Sepoy Kamal Ram the Victoria Cross, Italy, 26 July 1944
  Mediterranean, Middle East and African theatres of World War II
  - East African campaign
  - North African campaign
    - Operation Compass
    - Operation Battleaxe
    - Operation Crusader
    - First Battle of El Alamein
    - Second Battle of El Alamein
  - Anglo-Iraqi War
  - Syria-Lebanon campaign
  - Anglo-Soviet invasion of Iran
  - Italian campaign
    - Battle of Monte Cassino
- Battle of Hong Kong
- Battle of Malaya
- Battle of Singapore
- Burma Campaign
  - Battle of Kohima
  - Battle of Imphal

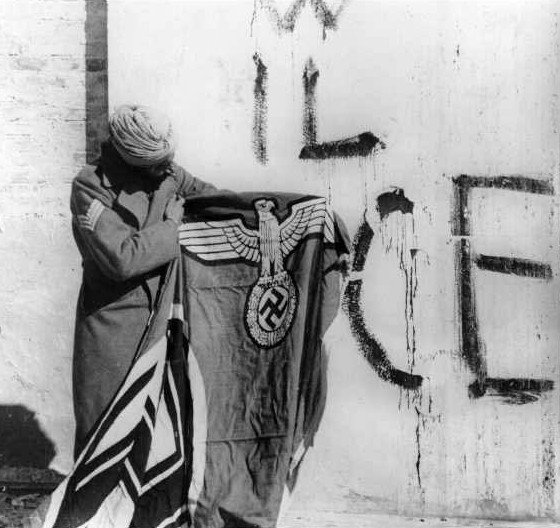
Sikh soldier with captured Nazi Swastika flag

Over the course of the Second World War, about 87,000 Indian soldiers were killed. In this period, 31 Indians were awarded the Victoria Cross (See: Indians in 'List of Victoria Cross Recipients by Nationality'). Out of the 252 Distinguished Service Orders awarded to the British Indian Army, at least 13 were awarded to native officers (See: South Asian Companions of the Distinguished Service Order).

The Germans and Japanese were relatively successful in recruiting combat forces from Indian prisoners of war. These forces were known as the Tiger Legion and the Indian National Army (INA). Indian nationalist leader Subhas Chandra Bose led the 40,000-strong INA. From a total of about 55,000 Indians taken prisoner in Malaya and Singapore in February 1942, about 30,000 joined the INA, which fought Allied forces in the Burma Campaign. Others became guards at Japanese POW camps. The recruitment was the brainchild of Major Fujiwara Iwaichi who mentions in his memoirs that Captain Mohan Singh Deb, who surrendered after the Battle of Jitra became the founder of the INA.

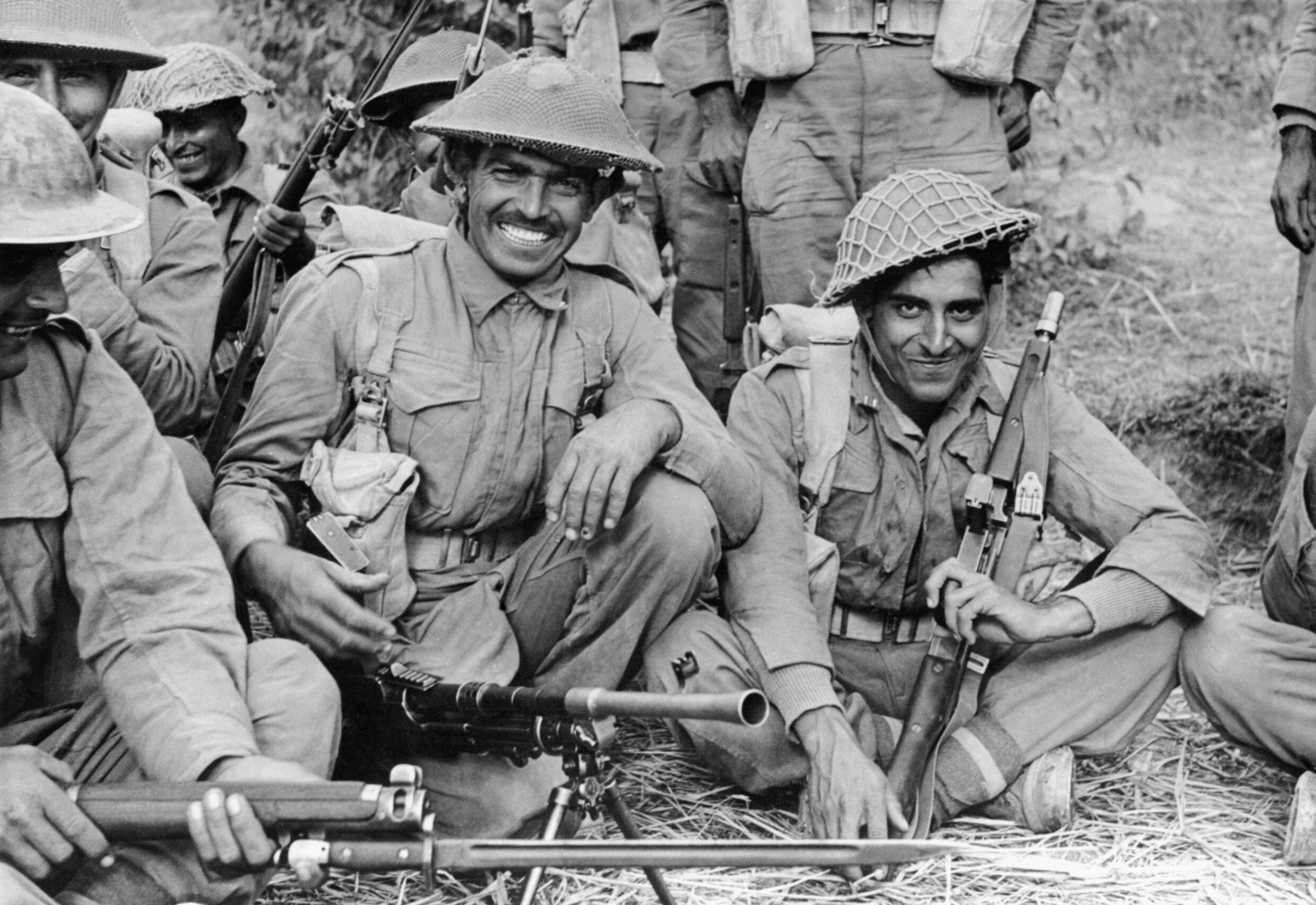
Soldiers of the 2nd Battalion, 7th Rajput Regiment about to go on patrol in Burma, 1944.

Some Indian Army personnel resisted recruitment and remained POWs. An unknown number captured in Malaya and Singapore were taken to Japanese-occupied areas of New Guinea as forced labour. Many of these men suffered severe hardships and brutality, similar to that experienced by other prisoners of Japan during the Second World War. About 6,000 of them survived until they were liberated by Australian or US forces, in 1943–45.

During the later stages of the Second World War, from the fall of Singapore and the ending of ABDACOM in early 1942 until the formation of the South East Asia Command (SEAC) in August 1943, some American and Chinese units were placed under British military command.

=== Post-Second World War ===
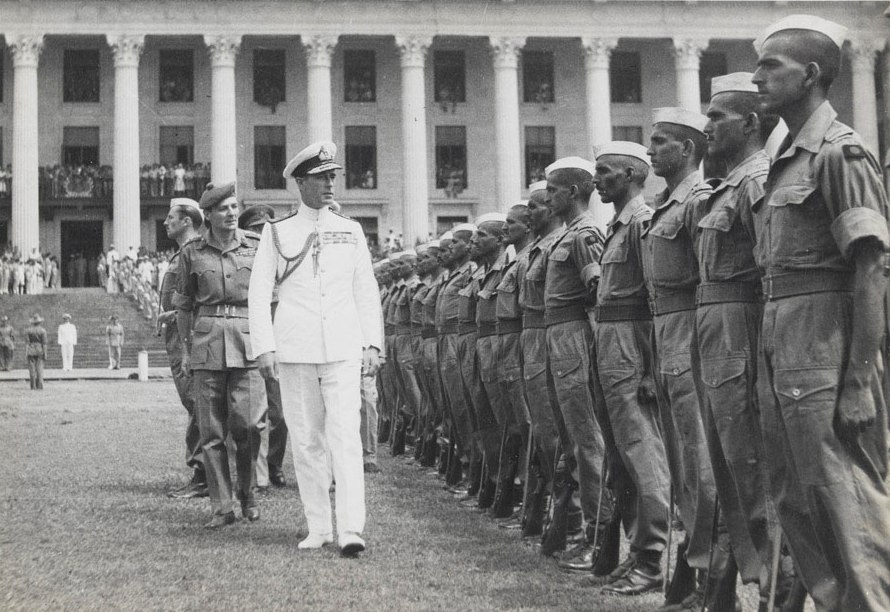
Lord Mountbatten inspects the 17th Dogra Regiment in Singapore, 1945.

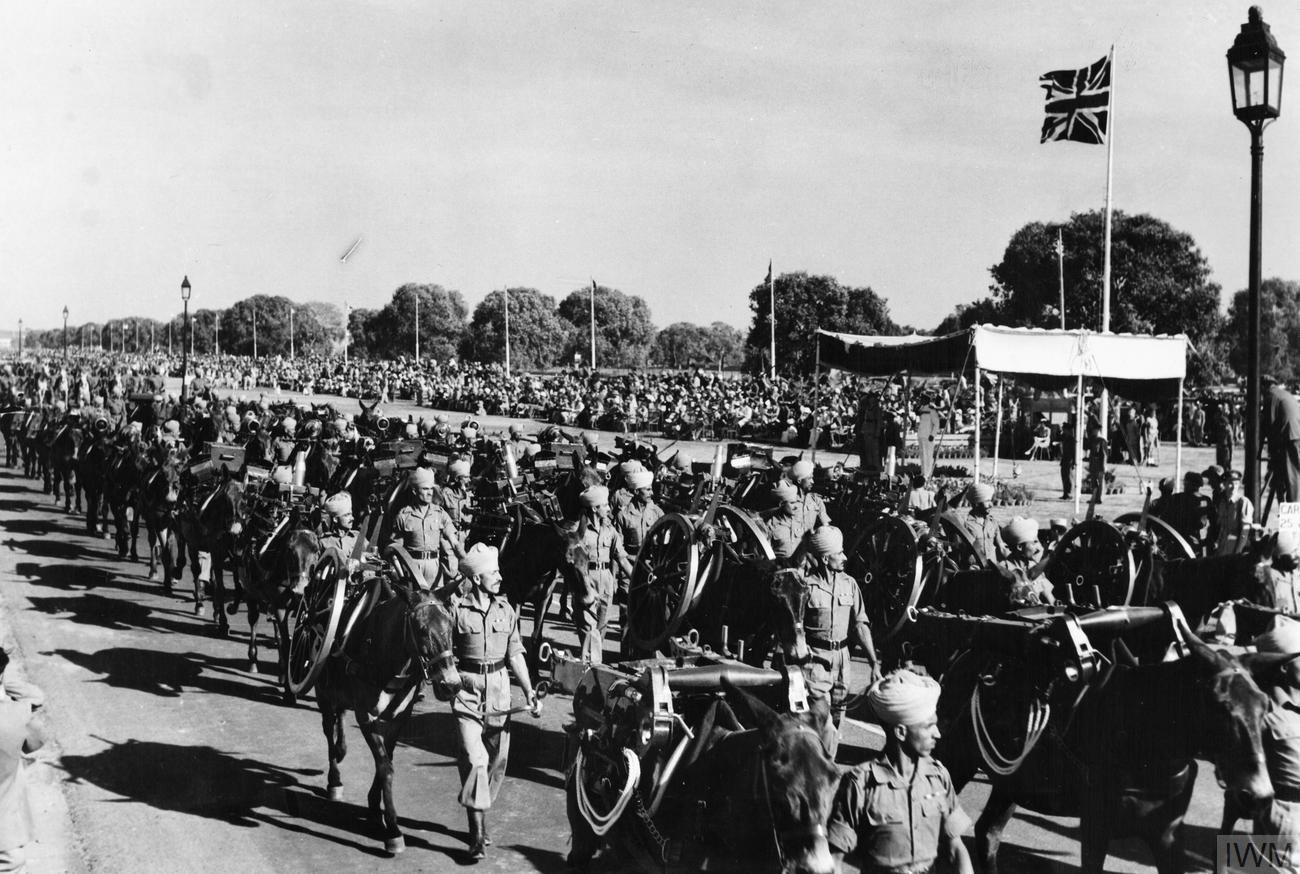
Indian Army soldiers pass the saluting base in the Delhi Victory Week Parade, 7 March 1946.

12 September 1946 the minister for external affairs in India, Jawaharlal Nehru demanded in a letter to the Commander in Chief and Defence Secretary, that a large-scale reform should be implemented to improve the Indian Army. Calcutta had been ravaged by large communal riots, but the British Indian Army was able to restore order. Nehru demanded with urgency, that the Indian Army should safeguard India's new democracy. Nehru was a nationalist and opposed India's "divide and rule" policy.

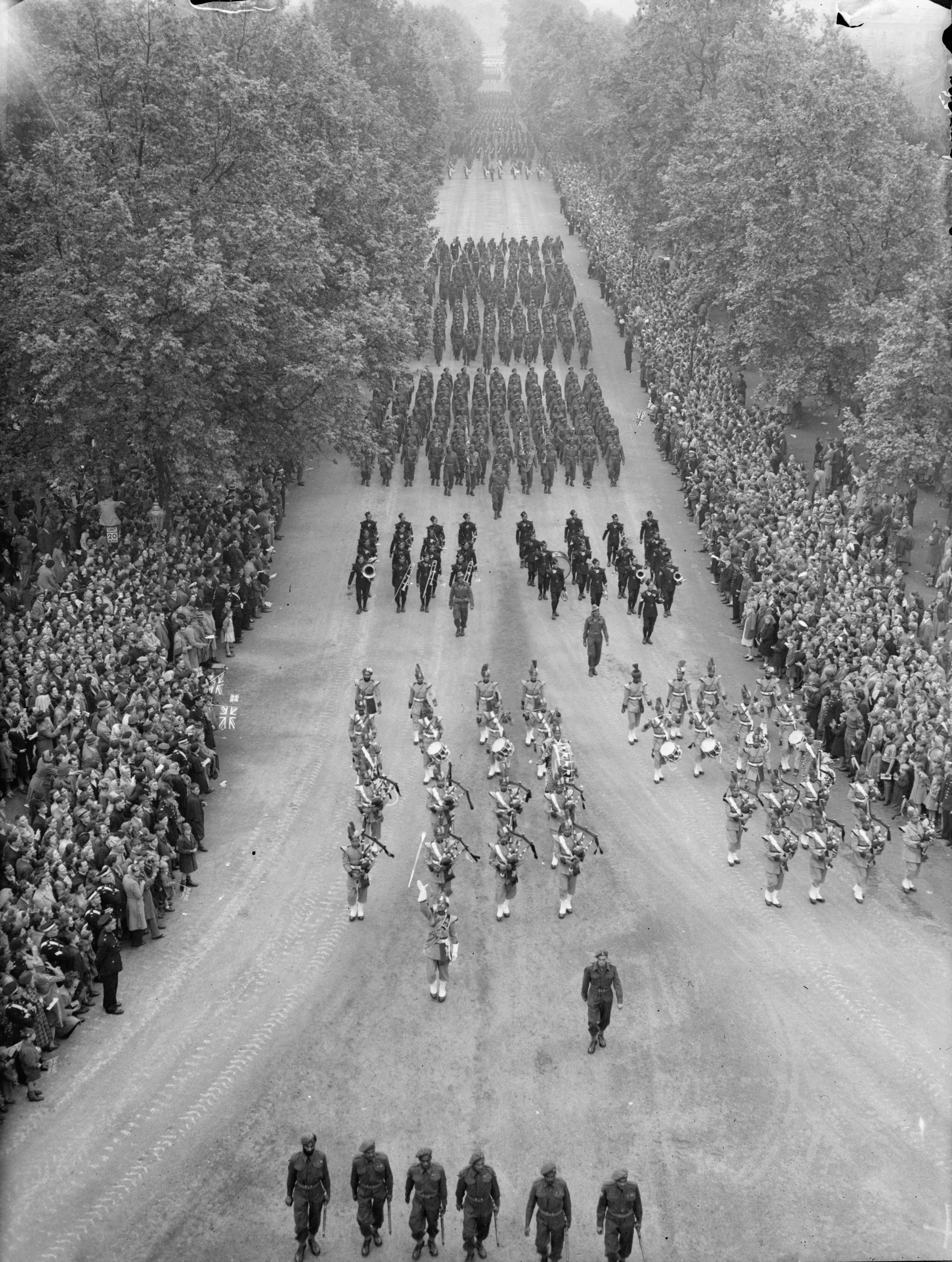
Contingent of infantry from the Indian Army at the Victory Parade in London, 8 June 1946.

As a result of the Partition of India in 1947, the formations, units, assets, and indigenous personnel of the Indian Army were divided between the Dominion of India and the Dominion of Pakistan. As Brian Lapping wrote, "By comparison with the two great provinces [Bengal & Punjab], partition of the army and the civil service was easy, though by any other standard, it was difficult, wasteful, and destructive. ... The men were transferred in their units. Regiments of Sikh and Hindu soldiers from the north-west frontier had to make their way through Muslim territory to get out of what was to be Pakistan." Also in 1947 a final agreement was signed regarding the Gurkha regiments in the British Indian Army. Four Gurkha regiments, recruited from both eastern and western Nepal, would join the British Army. The remaining six Gurkha regiments of the British Indian Army joined the Dominion of India. During the transition period after partition, those Gurkha regiments that were in Pakistan, did their service, but were eventually moved back to India.

The partition reduced the ethnic imbalance of the British Indian Army, which became the present-day Indian Army. But, the partition resulted in more ethnic imbalance in the Pakistani military, mainly because the new nation state of Pakistan was formed by joining West Punjab, NWFP, East Bengal, Baluchistan, and Sind. The new Pakistan Army was mainly made up of soldiers from two of these provinces. The Bangladesh Army, which was created from the Pakistan Army on the independence of Bangladesh, retain many British Indian Army traditions.

For a number of reasons, the pensions paid to long-serving officers and men of the Army, whether in Britain or in India, were lower than those of the British Army, and the background to this was set out at some length by Lord Middleton in the House of Lords on 9 March 1949. He summed up the position for the pensions of widows and orphans as follows:

The lowest pension at present given to the widow of an officer of the Indian Army is £54 a year. That will be reduced very shortly to £50 a year and, in due course, to £44 a year. The highest rate of pension at present given is £220 a year, which will now be reduced to £212, and in due course may be reduced to £188 a year. There are three intermediary classes whose pensions will be reduced proportionately, and also the small pensions for children.

== Organisation ==
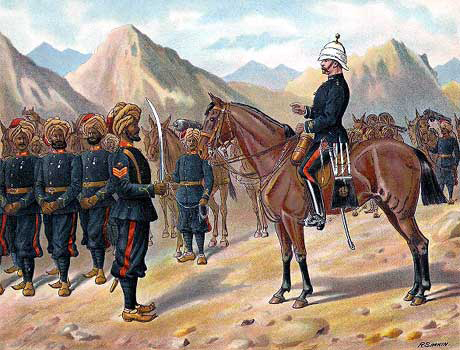
No. 1 Kohat Mountain Battery of the Punjab Frontier Force, illustration by Richard Simkin, c. 1896.

The armies of the East India Company were recruited primarily from forward caste Hindus and Muslims in the Bengal Presidency, which consisted of Bengal, Bihar, Uttar Pradesh, and Oudh. This formed the nucleus and later expanded into the armies of the three Presidencies and provinces of British India. Writing in The Indian Army (1834), Sir John Malcolm, who had a lifetime's experience of Indian soldiering, wrote about the Bengal Presidency.

"They consist largely of Rajpoots (Rajput), who are a distinguished race among the Khiteree (Kshatriya), or Brhamins (Brahmin) We may judge of the size of these men when we are told that the height below which no recruit is taken is five feet six inches. The great proportion of the Grenadiers are six feet and upwards."

— John Malcolm

The meaning of the term Indian Army changed over time, initially as an informal collective term for the armies of the three presidencies–the Bengal Army, Madras Army and Bombay Army–between 1858 and 1894. In 1895, the Indian Army began its formal existence and was the "army of the government of India", including British and Indian (sepoy) units; this arrangement lasted until 1902.

Many of these troops took part in the Indian Mutiny, with the aim of reinstating the Mughal Emperor Bahadur Shah II at Delhi, partly as a result of insensitive treatment by their British officers. During this period, the Company Raj relied heavily upon the armies of Princely states to quell the rebellion.

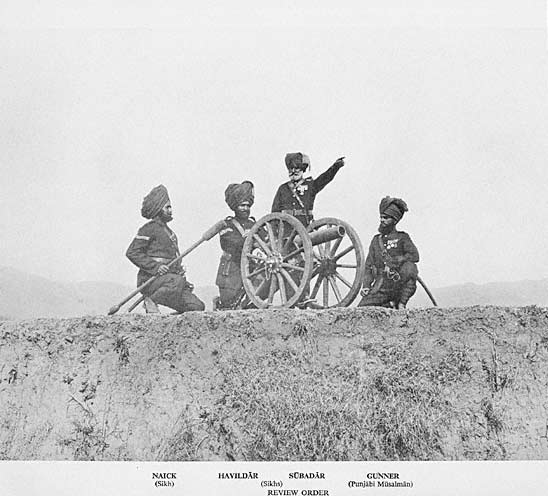
No. 4 (Hazara) Mountain Battery with RML 7-pounder mountain gun. Left to right Subadars (Sikhs) and Gunners (Punjabi Musalman) c. 1895.

The officer commanding the Army of India was the Commander-in-Chief, India who reported to the civilian Governor-General of India. The title was used before the creation of a unified British Indian Army; the first reported holder was then-Major Stringer Lawrence in 1748. Lawrence went to India with no larger command than a "small undisciplined garrison of two or three hundred men" facing a significant French presence. In 1903, Lord Kitchener became the Commander-in-Chief of the Indian Army. He instituted large-scale reforms, the greatest of which was the merger of the three armies of the Presidencies into a unified force. He formed higher level formations, eight army divisions, and brigaded Indian and British units. He left his command in 1909. Following Kitchener's reforms, the terminology used for the forces in India was altered. The Indian Army referred from that time to "the force recruited locally and permanently based in India, together with its expatriate British officers;" the British Army in India referred to the British Army units posted to India for a tour of duty, and which would then be posted to other parts of the Empire or back to the UK. The Army of India was used to describe the combined forces of both the Indian Army and the British Army in India.

By the early 1900s the three previous separate army staffs had been amalgamated into Headquarters, India (see 1906 Birthday Honours) which by 1922 had become GHQ India (see 1922 New Year Honours).

=== Command ===
O'Moore Creagh

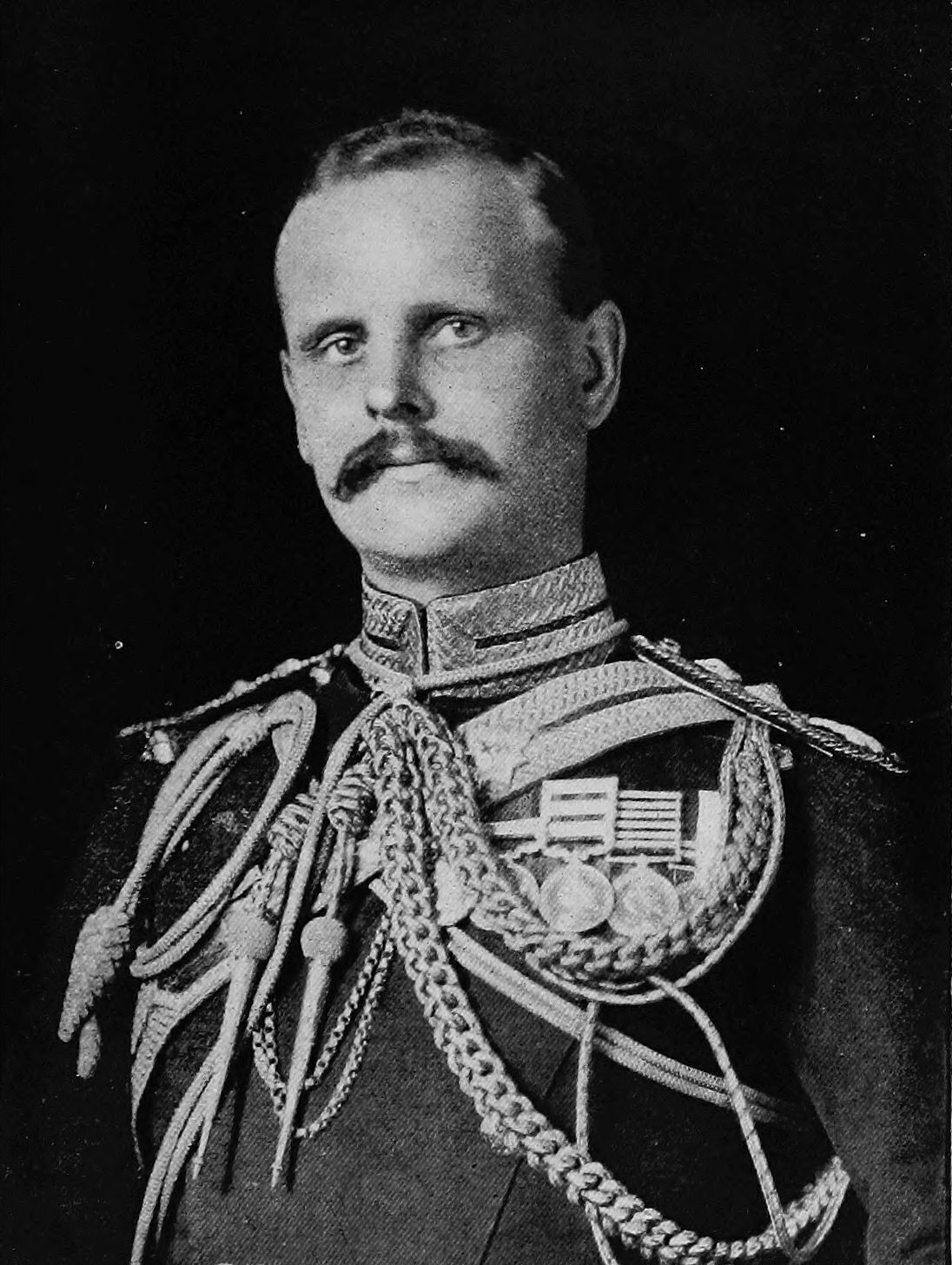
William Birdwood

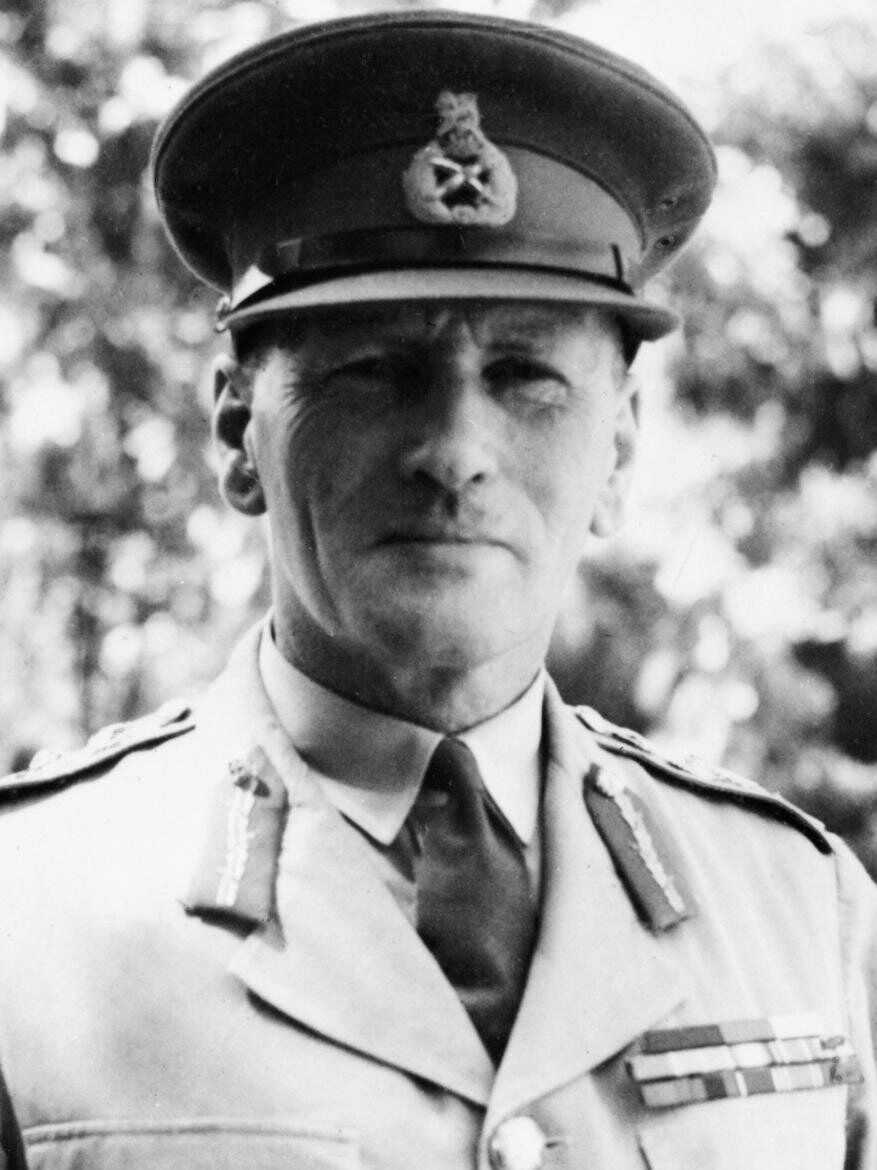
Claude Auchinleck

Indian Army postings were less prestigious than British Army positions, but the pay was significantly greater so that officers could live on their salaries instead of having to have a private income. Accordingly, vacancies in the Indian Army were much sought after and generally reserved for the higher placed officer-cadets graduating from the Royal Military College, Sandhurst. British officers in the Indian Army were expected to learn to speak the Indian languages of their men, who tended to be recruited from primarily Hindi speaking areas. Prominent British Indian Army officers included Lord Roberts, Sir O'Moore Creagh, Lord Birdwood, Sir Claude Auchinleck ("The Auk") and Lord Slim.

=== Personnel ===
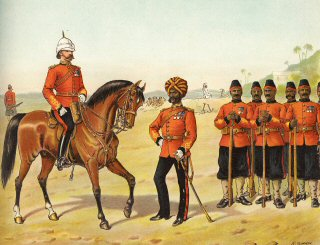
The Queen's Own Madras Sappers and Miners, illustration c. 1896.

Commissioned officers, British and Indian, held identical ranks to commissioned officers of the British Army. King's Commissioned Indian Officers (KCIOs), created from the 1920s, held equal powers to British officers. Viceroy's Commissioned Officers were Indians holding officer ranks. They were treated in almost all respects as commissioned officers, but had authority over Indian troops only, and were subordinate to all British King's (and Queen's) Commissioned Officers and KCIOs. They included Subedar Major or Risaldar-Major (Cavalry), equivalents to a British Major; Subedar or Risaldar (Cavalry) equivalents to Captain; and Jemadars equivalent to Lieutenant.

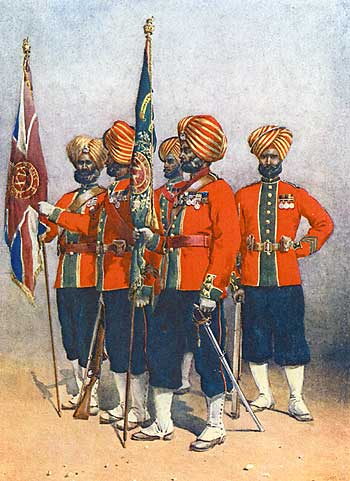
Colour party of the 15th Sikhs, published 1918.

Recruitment was entirely voluntary; about 1.75 million men served in the First World War, many on the Western Front and 2.5 million in the Second. Non-Commissioned Officers included Company Havildar Majors equivalents to a Company Sergeant Major; Company Quartermaster Havildars, equivalents to a Company Quartermaster Sergeant; Havildars or Daffadars (Cavalry) equivalents to a Sergeant; Naik or Lance-Daffadar (Cavalry) equivalents to a British Corporal; and Lance-Naik or Acting Lance-Daffadar (Cavalry) equivalents to a Lance-Corporal.

Soldier ranks included Sepoys or Sowars (Cavalry), equivalent to a British private. British Army ranks such as gunner and sapper were used by other corps.

In the aftermath of the Indian Rebellion of 1857, also called the Sepoy Mutiny by the British, the three armies of the former Presidencies of the East India Company passed to the British Crown. After the Mutiny, recruitment switched to what the British called the "martial races", particularly Sikhs, Awans, Gakhars, and other Punjabi Musulmans, Baloch, Pashtuns, Marathas, Bunts, Nairs, Rajputs, Ahir, Kumaonis, Gurkhas, Garhwalis, Janjuas, Maravars, Kallars, Vellalar, Dogras, Jats, Gurjar, Mahars and Sainis. Gurkhas had gone into the British army and were known to have rarely rebelled. The Sikhs, after the First and Second Anglo-Sikh Wars, treated the British Army as a replacement for the Sikh Khalsa Army.

== See also ==
- Commander-in-Chief, India
- Chief of the General Staff (India)
- List of regiments of the Indian Army (1903)
- List of Indian Victoria Cross recipients
- Indian Order of Merit
- Indian Distinguished Service Medal
- Order of British India
- Observatory Ridge, Johannesburg, site of a monument commemorating the British Indian Army
- Royal Indian Navy
- Royal Indian Air Force
- Indian Military Historical Society
- Royal Netherlands East Indies Army – having a similar function in the Netherlands East Indies

== Bibliography ==
- Barkawi, Tarak (April 2006). "Culture and Combat in the Colonies: The Indian Army In the Second World War". Journal of Contemporary History. 41 (2). Sage: 325–355. doi:10.1177/0022009406062071. S2CID 145364543.
- Barthorp, Michael (2002). Afghan Wars and the North-West Frontier 1839–1947. London: Cassel. ISBN 0-304-36294-8.
- Barua, Pradeep (2003). Gentlemen of the Raj: The Indian Army Officer Corps, 1817–1949. Westport, CT: Praegar. ISBN 0275979997.
- Chandler, David (2002). Oxford History of the British Army (2nd ed.). USA: Oxford University Press. ISBN 0192803115.
- Gaylor, John (1996). Sons of John Company – The Indian & Pakistan Armies 1903–1991. Tunbridge Wells, Kent: Parapress. ISBN 1-898594-41-4.
- Haythornthwaite, P.J. (1992). The World War One Sourcebook. Arms and Armour Press.
- Heathcote, T. A. (1974). The Indian Army – The Garrison of British Imperial India, 1822–1922. Newton Abbot, Devon: David & Charles.
- Ilbert, Courtenay (1 January 1913). "British India". Journal of the Society of Comparative Legislation. 13 (2): 327–333. JSTOR 752287.
- Imperial Gazetteer of India, Volume IV (1908). Indian Empire: Administrative. Oxford: Clarendon Press. p. 552.
- Jackson, Donovan (1940). India's Army. London: Sampson Low.
- Lapping, Brian (1985). End of Empire. London: Guild Publishing.
- Mazumder, Rajit K. (2003). The Indian army and the making of Punjab. Delhi, India: Permanent Black. ISBN 8178240599.
- Nathan, R.; Lee-Warner, William; Carnduff, H. W. C.; Maclagan, E. D.; Walker, G. H. D.; Collen, Edwin; Nathan; Bythel, W. J.; Hemming, T. H. (1908). The Imperial Gazetteer of India. Assistance by A. W. Alcock. Oxford: The Claredon Press.
- Raugh, Harold E. (2004). The Victorians at war, 1815–1914: an encyclopaedia of British military history. s.
- Robson, Brian (2007). The Road to Kabul. Stroud, Gloucestershire: Spellmount. ISBN 978-1-86227-416-7.
- Roger, Alexander (2003). Battle Honours of the British Empire and Commonwealth Land Forces 1662–1991. Marlborough: Crowood Press. ISBN 1-86126-637-5.
- Spilsbury, Julian (2007). The Indian Mutiny. Jouve, France: Orion Publishing Group. p. 9. ISBN 9780297856306.
- Sumner, Ian (2001). The Indian Army 1914-1947. Illustrated by Mike Chappell. UK: Osprey Publishing. ISBN 1-84176-196-6.
- Weeks, John (1979). World War II Small Arms. New York: Galahad Books. ISBN 0-88365-403-2.
