= 3rd Madras Regiment =

- Active: 1922–1947
- Country: (British Raj) British India
- Allegiance: British Empire
- Branch: British Indian Army
- Type: Infantry
- Size: Regiment

The 3rd Madras Regiment was an infantry regiment of the British Indian Army formed after the World War I reforms of the Indian Army. The infantry regiments were converted into large regiments with four or five battalions in each regiment plus a training battalion, always numbered the 10th. The regiment was later disbanded for economic reasons. The 3rd and 4th Battalions were disbanded in 1923, the 2nd and 10th in 1926 and the 1st in 1928.

== Formation ==
It was due to the 'spirited advocacy' of the then Governor of Madras Sir Arthur Hope, that the 3rd Madras Regiment was restored to the Army List in 1941; the old 11th, 12th, 13th and 15th Territorial battalions were converted into regular units, becoming the 1st to 4th Battalions of the reconstituted Regiment, with the Regimental Centre at Madukkarai (Coimbatore). Hectic training activity commenced and several other battalions were raised.

The 4th Battalion joined the War at Imphal in 1943 and distinguished itself in the fierce fighting that ensued in Tamu in March 1944. Capt RS Noronha tenaciously held his company defences for sixteen days against repeated attacks, inflicting heavy casualties on the enemy, for which he was awarded Military Cross. He was again instrumental in launching a feint attack to relieve pressure on 19 Inf Div bridge-head for which he was awarded a Bar to Military Cross.

In October 1945, all the Infantry Regiments of the Indian Army (barring Punjab) shed their numbers and the 3rd Madras Regiment became simply The Madras Regiment. At the time of Independence it had four battalions, 1st to 4th, with the Regimental Centre having shifted in 1946 to Trichinapally.

Regiments that joined:

- 1st Battalion ex 73rd Carnatic Infantry
- 2nd Battalion ex 75th Carnatic Infantry
- 3rd Battalion ex 79th Carnatic Infantry
- 4th Battalion ex 83rd Wallajahbad Light Infantry
- 10th (Training) Battalion ex 86th Carnatic Infantry
