= 8th Punjab Regiment =

Infantry regiment

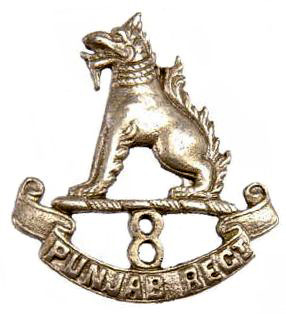
- Active: 1922 - 1956
- Allegiance: British India (1922 - 47); Pakistan (1947 - 56)
- Branch: British Indian Army; Pakistan Army
- Type: Line Infantry
- Regimental Centre: Lahore
- Uniform: Drab; faced blue
- March: God Bless the Prince of Wales
- Engagements: Second Poligar War 1801; Second Anglo-Maratha War 1803-05; Travancore War 1808-09; Third Anglo-Maratha War 1817-19; Third Kandy War 1818; First Burma War 1824-26; Naning War 1831-32; Coorg War 1834; Second Burma War 1852-53; Indian Rebellion of 1857; Second Afghan War 1878-80; Rampa Rebellion of 1879; Third Burma War 1885-87; Upper Burma 1890-96; Manipur Expedition 1891; The Boxer Rebellion 1900; First World War 1914-18 (France & Flanders, Egypt, Palestine, Gallipoli, Mesopotamia, Aden, Salonika, Russia); Third Afghan War 1919; Iraqi Revolt 1920; Second World War 1939-45 (Italy, Iran, Iraq, Burma, Malaya, French Indochina, Dutch East Indies); Kashmir War 1948

Commanders
- Colonel-in-Chief: King Edward VIII
- Colonels of the Regiment: General Sir Edward Quinan; Brigadier Fazal Ur Rahman Kallue

The 8th Punjab Regiment was a regiment of the British Indian Army from 1922 to 1947. It was transferred to Pakistan Army on Partition of India in 1947 and merged with the Baluch Regiment in 1956.

== History ==
=== Madras Infantry ===
The 8th Punjab Regiment had its origins in the Madras Army, where its first battalion was raised at Masulipatam in 1798. Four more battalions were raised in 1799-1800. In 1824, they were designated as the 29th, 30th, 31st, 32nd and 33rd Regiments of Madras Native Infantry. In the early 19th century, these battalions were engaged in fighting the Marathas and took part in a number of foreign expeditions including the Anglo-Burmese Wars. Between 1890 and 1893, they were reconstituted with Punjabi Muslims and Sikhs as Burma Battalions and permanently based in Burma to police the turbulent Burmese hill tracts. Under the Kitchener Reforms of 1903, they were redesignated as the 89th, 90th, 91st, 92nd Punjabis, and 93rd Burma Infantry. They were delocalized from Burma before the First World War.

=== First World War ===
- 89th Punjabis - India, Aden, Egypt, Gallipoli, France, Mesopotamia, Salonika, Russia.
- 2/89th Punjabis - Raised in 1917 - India, Iraq.
- 90th Punjabis - India, Mesopotamia.
- 2/90th Punjabis - Raised in 1918 - India. Disbanded 1922.
- 91st Punjabis (Light Infantry) - Burma, Mesopotamia, Egypt, Palestine.
- 2/91st Punjabis (Light Infantry) - Raised in 1918 - India, Egypt. Disbanded 1921.
- 92nd Punjabis - India, Egypt, Mesopotamia, Palestine.
- 93rd Burma Infantry - India, Egypt, France, Mesopotamia, Palestine.

Only 2/89th Punjabis of the wartime raisings was retained after the post-war reforms.

The 8th Punjabis have a most distinguished record of service during the First World War. Their long list of honours and awards includes the Victoria Cross awarded to Naik Shahmed Khan of 89th Punjabis in 1916. The 89th Punjabis had the unique distinction of serving in more theatres of war than any other unit of the British Empire. These included Aden, where they carried out the first opposed sea-borne assault landing in modern warfare, Egypt, Gallipoli, France, Mesopotamia, North-West Frontier Province, Salonika and Russian Transcaucasia. All battalions served in Mesopotamia, while 93rd Burma Infantry also served in France. The 92nd Punjabis were made 'Prince of Wales's Own' in 1921 for their gallantry and sacrifices during the war.

In 1922, the five battalions along with the war-raised 2/89th Punjabis were united to form the 8th Punjab Regiment:

- 1/89th Punjabis - 1st Battalion 8th Punjab Regiment
- 90th Punjabis - 2nd Battalion 8th Punjab Regiment
- 91st Punjabis (Light Infantry) - 3rd Battalion 8th Punjab Regiment
- 92nd (Prince of Wales's Own) Punjabis - 4th Battalion (Prince of Wales's Own)8th Punjab Regiment
- 93rd Burma Infantry - 5th (Burma) Battalion 8th Punjab Regiment
- 2/89th Punjabis - 10th Battalion (Training Battalion) 8th Punjab Regiment

The new class composition of the 8th Punjab Regiment was Punjabi Muslims, Sikhs and Hindu Gujars. Chinthe - the stylised lion, guardian of Buddhist pagodas in Burma, was chosen as its new emblem. The uniform was of drab colour with blue facings. In inter-war period, the Regiment saw extensive service on the North West Frontier of India.

=== Second World War ===
- 1st Battalion - India, Malaya. Captured at Singapore in 1942. Reformed in 1946 by redesignation of 9/8th Punjab.
  King George VI inspecting 3/8th Punjab, Siena, Italy, 26 July 1944.
- 2nd Battalion - India, Burma, French Indochina.
- 3rd Battalion - India, Iran, Italy.
- 4th Battalion - India, Iraq, Iran.
- 5th Battalion - India, Burma, Malaya, Dutch East Indies.
- 6th Battalion (Machine Gun) - Raised in 1940. India, Malaya, Dutch East Indies. Disbanded January 1948; re-raised October 1948.
- 7th Battalion - Raised in 1940. India, Singapore. Captured by the Japanese in February 1942.
- 8th Battalion - Raised in 1941. India, Burma.
- 9th Battalion - Raised in 1941. India, Ceylon, Cyprus. Redesignated as 1/8th Punjab in 1946. Re-raised 1948.
- 10th Battalion - Converted into Regimental Centre in 1942.
- 14th Battalion - Raised in 1941. Converted into 9th (Punjab) Heavy Anti-aircraft Regiment, Indian Artillery, in 1942. India, Ceylon. Disbanded 1946.
- 15th Battalion - Raised in 1942. Became a training battalion. India. Disbanded 1946.
- 16th Battalion - Raised in 1943. Became a training battalion. India. Disbanded 1946.
- 25th Garrison Battalion - Raised in 1941. India. Disbanded 1946.
- 26th Garrison Battalion - Raised in 1942. India. Disbanded 1946.

During the Second World War the 8th Punjab Regiment again distinguished itself, suffering more than 4500 casualties. It was awarded two Victoria Crosses to Havildar Parkash Singh and Sepoy Kamal Ram, besides numerous other gallantry awards. The regiment raised a further nine battalions. Two of its battalions, the 1st and 7th, were captured on Singapore Island, when the British Commonwealth Army surrendered there to the Japanese on 15 February 1942. Four battalions fought in the Burma Campaign, while others saw service in Iraq, Iran, Italy, French Indochina and the Dutch East Indies. Two men from the 8th Punjab Regiment received the Victoria Cross: Havildar Parkash Singh in Burma and Sepoy Kamal Ram in Italy. By the end of the war, the Regiment consisted of 14 Battalions. However, most of the war-raised units were disbanded in 1946 except the 6th and 8th Battalions.

=== Post-independence ===
In 1947, the 8th Punjab Regiment was allocated to Pakistan, and Sikhs and Gujars were exchanged with Hindustani Muslims from units allotted to India. In January 1948, 6th Battalion was disbanded, only to be re-raised in October along with the 9th Battalion, in response of the Kashmir War with India. In 1956, the eight battalions of 8th Punjab Regiment were merged with the Baluch Regiment. Their new designations were:

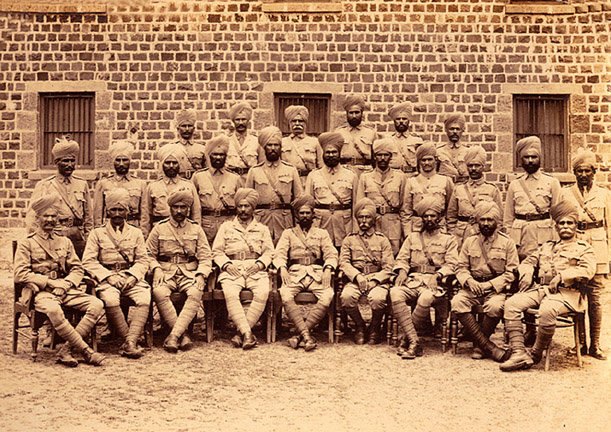
Indian Officers of 1st Battalion 91st Punjabis (Light Infantry), Poona, 1920.

- 1/8th Punjab - 1 Baluch
- 2/8th Punjab - 2 Baluch
- 3/8th Punjab - 3 Baluch
- 4/8th Punjab (Prince of Wales's Own) - 4 Baluch
- 5/8th Punjab (Burma) - 5 Baluch
- 6/8th Punjab - 13 Baluch
- 8/8th Punjab - 17 Baluch
- 9/8th Punjab - 18 Baluch

== Battle honours ==
Cochin, Maheidpoor, Ava, Afghanistan 1878-80, Burma 1885–87, China 1900, Loos, France and Flanders 1915, Macedonia 1918, Helles, Krithia, Gallipoli 1915, Suez Canal, Egypt 1915, Megiddo, Sharon, Palestine 1918, Tigris 1916, Kut al Amara 1917, Baghdad, Khan Baghdadi, Mesopotamia 1915–18, Afghanistan 1919, The Trigno, Perano, The Sangro, Gustav Line, Monte Grande, The Senio, Italy 1943-45, North Malaya, Jitra, Gurun, Kampar, Malaya 1941–42, Donbaik, North Arakan, The Shweli, Myitson, Kama, Burma 1942–45.

== See also ==
- The Baloch Regiment
- Madras Army
- Colonel Charles James William Grant, VC (Victoria Cross recipient, 1891)
- General Sir Edward Quinan, KCB, KCIE, DSO, OBE (GOC British Tenth Army 1942-43)
- Naik Shahmed Khan, VC, (Victoria Cross recipient, 1916)
- Havildar Parkash Singh, VC, (Victoria Cross recipient, 1943)
- Sepoy Kamal Ram, VC, (Victoria Cross recipient, 1944)
