= 15th Madras Native Infantry =

The 15th Madras Native Infantry can refer to the:

- 89th Punjabis which was the 1st Battalion, 15th Madras Native Infantry in 1798
- 90th Punjabis which was the 2nd Battalion, 15th Madras Native Infantry in 1798
- 75th Carnatic Infantry which was called the 15th Madras Native Infantry in 1824
