= 16th Madras Native Infantry =

The 16th Madras Native Infantry may refer to:

- 91st Punjabis (Light Infantry) which formed the 1st Battalion, 16th Madras Native Infantry in 1800
- 92nd Punjabis which formed the 2nd Battalion, 16th Madras Native Infantry in 1800
- 76th Punjabis which was called the 16th Madras Native Infantry in 1824
