= 92nd Punjabis =

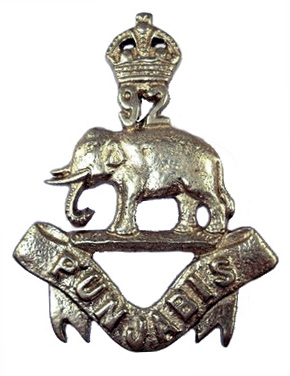
- Active: 1903 - 1922
- Country: British India
- Branch: British Indian Army
- Type: Infantry
- Size: 1 Battalion
- Uniform: Red; faced yellow in 1882; Blue; faced scarlet in 1892; Drab; faced white 1897
- Engagements: Second Poligar War 1801; Travancore War 1808-09; First Anglo-Burmese War 1824-26; Coorg War 1834; Indian Rebellion of 1857; Upper Burma 1890-96; Manipur Expedition 1891; First World War 1914-18 (Egypt, Palestine, Mesopotamia)

Commanders
- Colonel-in-Chief: Edward, The Prince of Wales.
- Colonel of the Regiment: Maj Gen ES Hastings, CB, DSO.

The 92nd Punjabis were an infantry regiment of the British Indian Army. The regiment was raised in 1800 as a battalion of Madras Native Infantry. It was designated as the 92nd Punjabis in 1903 and became 4th Battalion (Prince of Wales's Own) 8th Punjab Regiment in 1922. In 1947, it was allocated to Pakistan Army, where it continues to exist as 4th Battalion of The Baloch Regiment.

== Early history ==
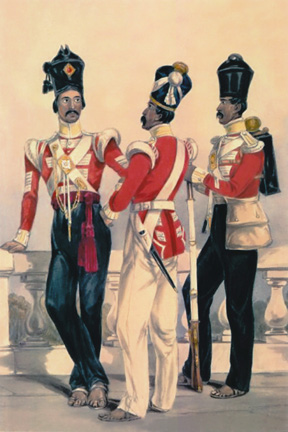
1845 lithograph of the 32nd Regiment of Madras Native Infantry

The regiment was raised on 1 January 1800 at Madura as the 2nd Battalion 16th Regiment of Madras Native Infantry by Lieutenant Colonel Alexander Dyce and was known as Dyce ki Paltan (Dyce's Battalion). It was composed mostly of Muslims, Tamils and Telugus. In 1801, it took part in suppressing a rebellion of the Poligars (local feudal chieftains) of Madura and Tinnevelly in South India. In 1809, it took part in the Travancore War and in 1824, it participated in the First Anglo-Burmese War. The same year, it was redesignated as the 32nd Regiment of Madras Native Infantry. During the Great Indian Rebellion of 1857, it operated in Central India.

In 1890, the 32nd Madras Infantry was reconstituted with Punjabi Muslims and Sikhs, and permanently based in Burma. Its designation was changed to 4th Regiment of Burma Infantry, and in 1891, to 32nd Regiment (4th Burma Battalion) of Madras Infantry. In 1901, its title was changed to 32nd Burma Infantry. The Burma Battalions were special units raised to police the new territories acquired in the Third Anglo-Burmese War and pacify the rebellious hill tribes inhabiting the frontier regions of Burma. In 1890 and 1894, the regiment operated in the Shan States, where it repulsed an incursion by the French. In 1891, it operated in the Chin Hills against recalcitrant hill tribes.

== 92nd Punjabis ==
Subsequent to the reforms brought about in the Indian Army by Lord Kitchener in 1903, all former Madras units had 60 added to their numbers. Consequently, the regiment's designation was changed to 92nd Punjabis. In 1910, Major General ES Hastings, CB, DSO, who had commanded the regiment from 1891 to 1907, was appointed the Colonel of 92nd Punjabis. In 1910, the Burma Battalions were delocalized from Burma and in 1913, the 92nd Punjabis moved to Benares in India.

On the outbreak of the First World War, the 92nd Punjabis sailed for Egypt in November 1914, where they defended the Suez Canal against an Ottoman attack in February 1915. Moving to Mesopotamia in December 1915, they were engaged in fierce fighting on the Tigris Front, as the British made desperate efforts to raise the siege of Kut, and later, during the British advance northwards. The regiment took part in the Battles of Sheikh Sa'ad, the Wadi, Hanna, the three Battles of Sannaiyat, and the Actions of Shawa Khan, Istabulat, Daur and Tikrit. It fought with great gallantry and suffered grievous losses in the long and bloody campaign. In 1918, the 92nd Punjabis proceeded to Palestine and took part in the Battle of Megiddo, which led to the annihilation of the Ottoman Army in Palestine.

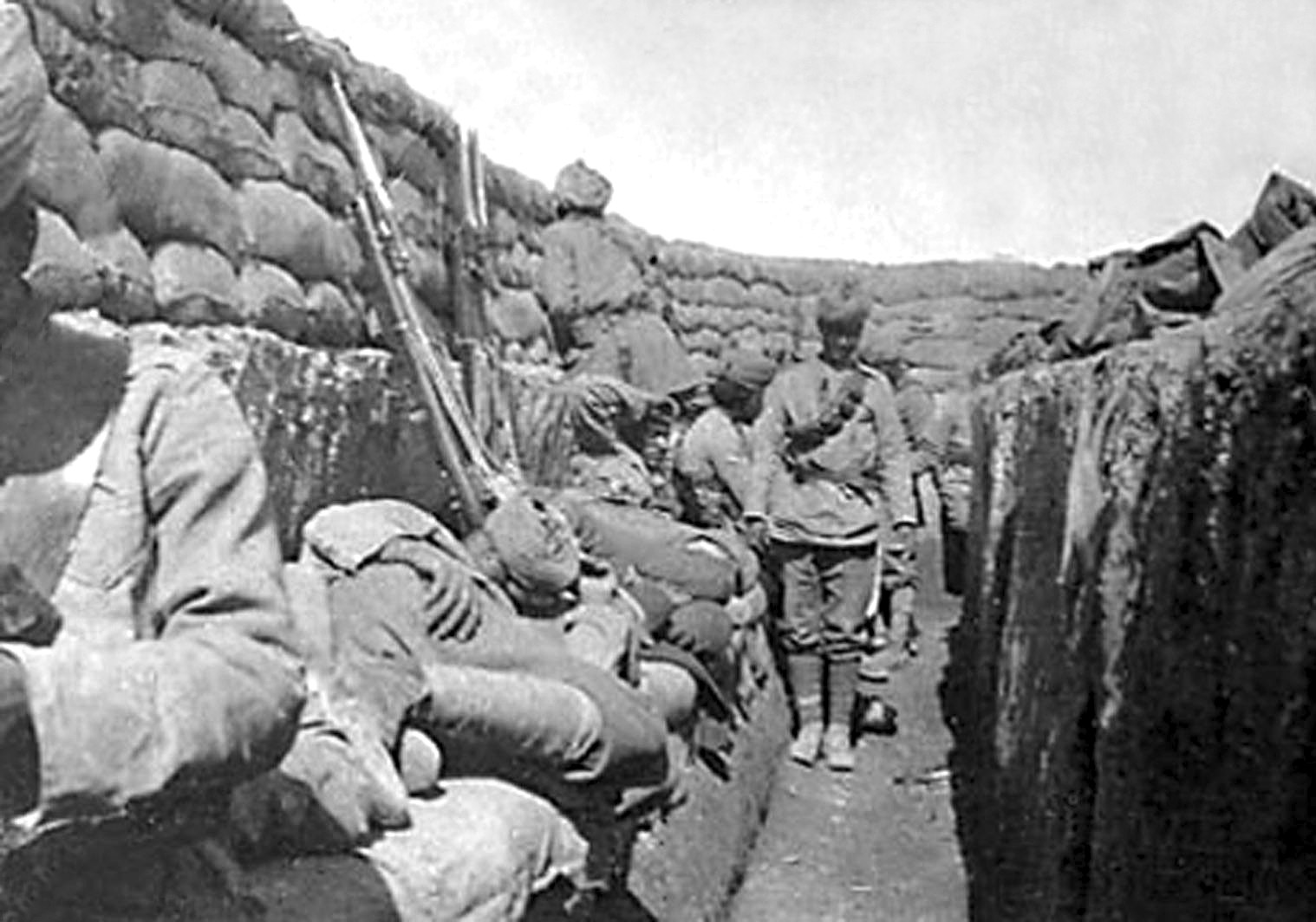
92nd Punjabis in a trench in Mesopotamia, c. 1916

During the war, the 92nd Punjabis suffered 1,591 casualties including 271 killed in action. For their exceptional bravery and excellent performance in the war, the 92nd Punjabis were made Prince of Wales's Own and on 1 January 1922, Edward, the Prince of Wales was gazetted as their Colonel-in-Chief.

== Subsequent history ==
After the First World War, the 92nd (Prince of Wales's Own) Punjabis were grouped with the 90th Punjabis, 91st Punjabis (Light Infantry), 93rd Burma Infantry and the two battalions of 89th Punjabis to form the 8th Punjab Regiment in 1922. The battalion was redesignated as the 4th Battalion (Prince of Wales's Own) 8th Punjab Regiment. During the Second World War, 4/8th Punjab (PWO) served in Iran and Iraq. In 1947, the 8th Punjab Regiment was allocated to Pakistan Army. In 1956, it was merged with the Baluch Regiment and 4/8th Punjab was redesignated as 4 Baluch (now 4 Baloch). During the Indo-Pakistani War of 1965, the battalion again distinguished itself on the Sialkot Front.

== Genealogy ==
- 1800 - 2nd Battalion 16th Regiment Madras Native Infantry
- 1824 - 32nd Regiment Madras Native Infantry
- 1885 - 32nd Regiment Madras Infantry
- 1890 - 4th Regiment Burma Infantry
- 1891 - 32nd Regiment (4th Burma Battalion) Madras Infantry
- 1901 - 32nd Burma Light Infantry
- 1903 - 92nd Punjabis
- 1922 - 92nd Prince of Wales's Own Punjabis
- 1922 - 4th Battalion (Prince of Wales's Own) 8th Punjab Regiment or 4/8th Punjab
- 1956 - 4th Battalion The Baluch Regiment or 4 Baluch
- 1991 - 4th Battalion The Baloch Regiment or 4 Baloch

== See also ==
- Baloch Regiment
- 8th Punjab Regiment
- Madras Army
- Colonel Charles James William Grant, VC (Victoria Cross recipient, 1891)
