= 89th Punjabis =

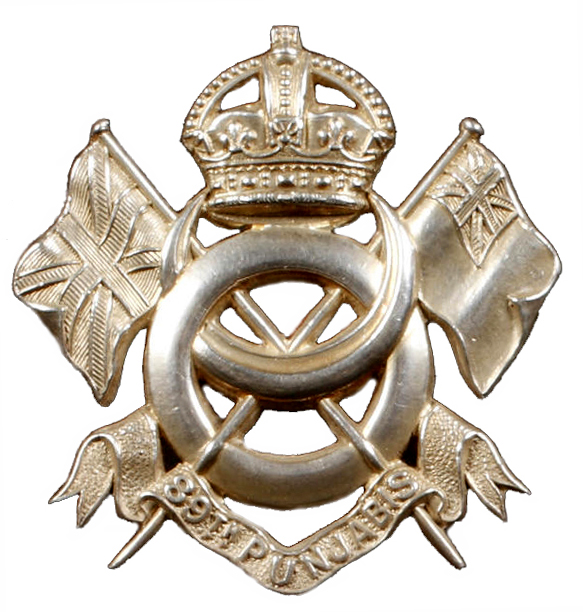
- Active: 1903–1922
- Country: British India
- Branch: British Indian Army
- Type: Infantry
- Size: 2 Battalions
- Uniform: Drab; faced blue. Red; faced white before 1897
- Engagements: Third Kandy War 1818; Naning War 1831–32; Rampa Rebellion 1879; Third Anglo-Burmese War 1885–87; Pacification of Upper Burma 1890–96; First World War 1914–18 (Aden, France, Egypt, Gallipoli, Mesopotamia, North West Frontier of India, Salonika, Russia); Third Afghan War 1919; Iraqi Revolt 1920

Commanders
- Colonel of the Regiment: Brig Gen LWY Campbell, CMG

The 89th Punjabis was an infantry regiment of the British Indian Army raised in 1798 as a battalion of Madras Native Infantry. It was designated as the 89th Punjabis in 1903 and became 1st Battalion 8th Punjab Regiment in 1922. In 1947, it was allocated to Pakistan Army, where it continues to exist as 1st Battalion, The Baloch Regiment.

== History ==
=== Formation and early service ===
The regiment was raised on 9 November 1798 at Masulipatam as the 3rd Extra Battalion of Madras Native Infantry by Captain Alexander MacLeod and was known as MacLeod ki Paltan (MacLeod's Battalion). In 1800, it was designated as the 1st Battalion 15th Regiment, and in 1824, as the 29th Regiment of Madras Native Infantry. The battalion was composed mostly of Muslims, Tamils and Telugus of South India. In 1818, it was dispatched to Ceylon to suppress a rebellion of the Sinhalese. In 1832, it was stationed at Malacca, Malaya, when it was again engaged in suppressing a revolt in the State of Naning.

The regiment served in Burma during the Third Anglo-Burmese War of 1885–87. In 1893, it was reconstituted with Punjabi Muslims, Sikhs, Rajputs Brahmins and in the 1930s Gurjars, and permanently based in Burma. Its new designation was 29th Regiment (7th Burma Battalion) of Madras Infantry. In 1901, its title was changed to 29th Burma Infantry. The Burma Battalions were special units raised to police the new territories acquired in the Third Anglo-Burmese War and pacify the rebellious hill tribes inhabiting the frontier regions of Burma.

=== Reorganisation and the First World War ===
Subsequent to the reforms brought about in the Indian Army by Lord Kitchener in 1903, all former Madras units had 60 added to their numbers. Consequently, the regiment's designation was changed to 89th Punjabis. In 1910, the Burma Battalions were delocalized from Burma and in 1914, the regiment moved to Dinapore in India, just before the outbreak of the First World War.

The 89th Punjabis have a most distinguished record of service during the First World War. They have the unique distinction of serving in more theatres of war than any other unit of the British Empire. These include:

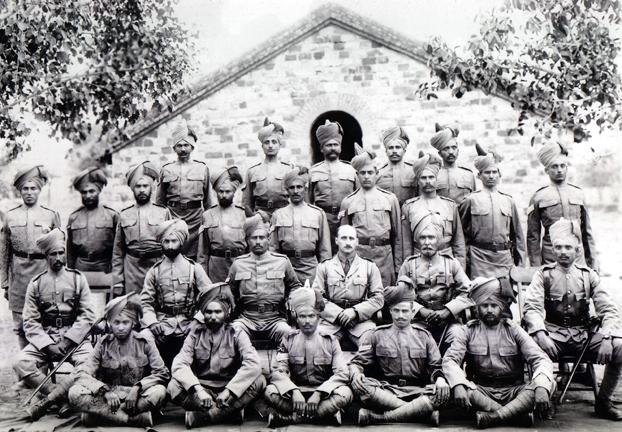
Gallantry Award recipients of 89th Punjabis with Lt Col NM Geoghegan, DSO, Nowshera, 1917.

- Aden (Yemen), where they carried out the first opposed sea-borne assault landing in modern warfare, when they landed at Sheik Saiad Peninsula on 10 November 1914
- Egypt, where they defended Suez Canal against the Turkish attack in February 1915.
- Gallipoli, where they fought in the Second Battle of Krithia in May 1915.
- France, where they endured the horrors of trench warfare from May to December 1915.
- Mesopotamia, where the regiment fought with great distinction and was almost decimated in the bloody battles for the Relief of Kut al Amara on the Tigris Front in 1916.
- North West Frontier of India, where they served on the Mohmand Blockade in 1917, while recuperating from the casualties suffered in Mesopotamia.
- Salonika (Greece), where they arrived in 1918 but were not actively engaged.
- Russian Transcaucasia, where they served from 1918 to 1920 as part of the British Expeditionary Force.

The regiment finally arrived home in August 1920 after six long years of active service. During the war, it suffered 1018 casualties including 211 killed. Their long list of honours and awards includes the Victoria Cross awarded to Naik Shahmed Khan in 1916.

The regiment raised a second battalion on 5 June 1917. The 2nd Battalion 89th Punjabis or 2/89th Punjabis served in the Third Afghan War of 1919 and took part in suppressing the Iraqi revolt against the British in 1920.

=== Later years ===
After the First World War, the two battalions of 89th Punjabis were grouped with four other Burma Battalions (90th, 91st, 92nd Punjabis and 93rd Burma Infantry) to form the 8th Punjab Regiment in 1922. The 1/89th Punjabis became the 1st Battalion and the 2/89th Punjabis the 10th (Training) Battalion of the new regiment. During the Second World War, 1/8th Punjab fought with great gallantry in the Malayan Campaign and again suffered heavy losses. In 1943, the 10th Battalion became the 8th Punjab Regimental Centre. In 1947, the 8th Punjab Regiment was allocated to Pakistan Army. In 1956, it was merged with the Baluch Regiment and 1/8th Punjab was redesignated as 1 Baluch (now 1 Baloch). During the Indo-Pakistan War of 1965, the battalion again distinguished itself at Lahore and Sulemanki, while during the Indo-Pakistan War of 1971 it was deployed in the Shakargarh Sector. Since then, it has served in the Siachen Conflict during 1990–91 and in Liberia as United Nations Peacekeepers in 2004.

== Lineage ==
- 1798 – 3rd Extra Battalion Madras Native Infantry
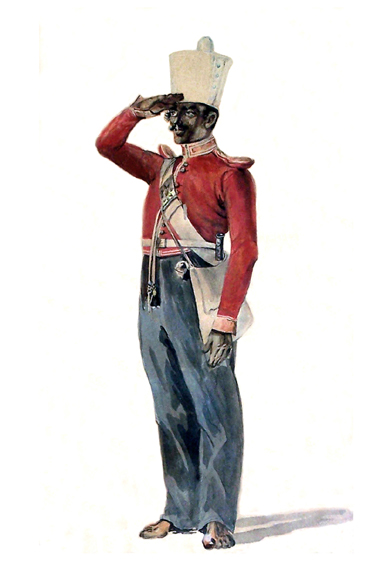
  29th Madras Native Infantry. Watercolour by Alex Hunter, 1846.
- 1800 – 1st Battalion 15th Regiment Madras Native Infantry
- 1824 – 29th Regiment Madras Native Infantry
- 1885 – 29th Regiment Madras Infantry
- 1893 – 29th Regiment (7th Burma Battalion) Madras Infantry
- 1901 – 29th Burma Infantry
- 1903 – 89th Punjabis
- 1917 – 1st Battalion 89th Punjabis or 1/89th Punjabis
- 1922 – 1st Battalion 8th Punjab Regiment or 1/8th Punjab
- 1956 – 1st Battalion The Baluch Regiment or 1 Baluch
- 1991 – 1st Battalion The Baloch Regiment or 1 Baloch

== See also ==
- Baloch Regiment
- 8th Punjab Regiment
- Madras Army
- Colonel Charles James William Grant, VC (Victoria Cross recipient, 1891)
- Naik Shahmed Khan, VC, (Victoria Cross recipient, 1916)
