= 93rd Burma Infantry =

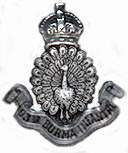
- Active: 1903 - 1922
- Country: British India
- Branch: British Indian Army
- Type: Infantry
- Size: 1 Battalion
- Uniform: Red; faced black; yellow in 1882; Drab; faced yellow in 1897
- Engagements: Second Anglo-Maratha War 1803-05; Travancore War 1808-09; Third Anglo-Maratha War 1817-19; Indian Rebellion of 1857; Pacification of Upper Burma 1890-96; First World War 1914-18 (France & Flanders, Egypt, Palestine, Mesopotamia)

The 93rd Burma Infantry was an infantry regiment of the British Indian Army. The regiment was raised in 1800 as a battalion of Madras Native Infantry. It was designated as the 93rd Burma Infantry in 1903 and became the 5th (Burma) Battalion 8th Punjab Regiment in 1922. In 1947, it was allocated to the Pakistan Army, where it continues to exist as 5th Battalion of The Baloch Regiment.

== Early history ==
The regiment was raised on 1 January 1800 at Guntur, in South India as the 1st Battalion 17th Regiment of Madras Native Infantry by Colonel George Wahab, and was known as Wahab ki Paltan (Wahab's Battalion). It was composed mostly of Muslims, Tamils and Telugus. In 1803, it took part in the Second Anglo-Maratha War, while in 1809, at Cochin, it repulsed a force of 3000 rebels during the Travancore War. In 1817, the battalion operated against the Pindaris during the Third Anglo-Maratha War. In 1824, it was redesignated as the 33rd Regiment of Madras Native Infantry. During the Great Indian Rebellion of 1857, it again operated against the Marathas in Central India.

In 1890, the 33rd Madras Infantry was reconstituted with Punjabi Muslims, Pathans and Sikhs, and permanently based in Burma. Its designation was changed to the 3rd Regiment of Burma Infantry, and in 1891, to the 33rd Regiment (3rd Burma Battalion) of Madras Infantry. In 1901, its title was changed to the 33rd Burma Infantry. The Burma Battalions were units raised to police the new territories acquired in the Third Anglo-Burmese War and pacify the rebellious hill tribes inhabiting the frontier regions of Burma. From 1891 to 1893, the regiment operated in the Kachin State in northern Burma, quelling various outbreaks of rebellion.

== 93rd Burma Infantry ==
As part of the reforms brought about in the Indian Army by Lord Kitchener in 1903, all former Madras units had 60 added to their numbers. Consequently, the regiment's designation was changed to 93rd Burma Infantry. In 1910, the Burma Battalions were delocalised from Burma and in 1913, the 93rd Burma Infantry moved to Barrackpore in India.

On the outbreak of the First World War, the regiment sailed for Egypt in November 1914, where it was deployed to defend the Suez Canal against the Turks. In September 1915, they left for France and over the next three months, served in the trenches of the Western Front. Early in 1916, the regiment arrived in Mesopotamia, where they were engaged in fierce fighting on the Tigris Front during British efforts to relieve the besieged garrison of Kut al Amara. The regiment took part in the Battles of Dujaila Redoubt, Beit Aissa, Khudaira Bend & Jebel Hamrin. It fought with great gallantry and suffered heavy losses in this long and bloody campaign. In 1918, the 93rd Burma Infantry proceeded to Palestine and took part in the Battle of Megiddo, which led to the annihilation of Turkish Army in Palestine.

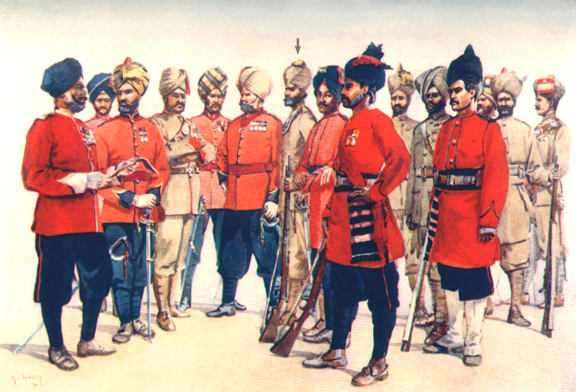
Types of Punjabi Regiments. Subedar 93rd Burma Infantry, seventh from left. Watercolour by Major AC Lovett, c. 1910.

During the war, the 93rd Burma Infantry suffered 1157 casualties including 235 killed. They received a large number of gallantry awards for their outstanding performance in the war.

== Subsequent History ==
After the First World War, the 93rd Burma Infantry was grouped with the 90th, 91st and 92nd Punjabis and the two battalions of 89th Punjabis to form the 8th Punjab Regiment, and was designated as the 5th (Burma) Battalion 8th Punjab Regiment in 1922. During the Second World War, 5/8th Punjab (Burma) fought in the Burma Campaign and served in the Dutch East Indies. In 1947, the 8th Punjab Regiment was allocated to the Pakistan Army. In 1956, it was merged with the Baluch Regiment and 5/8th Punjab was designated as 5 Baluch (now 5 Baloch).

== Genealogy ==
- 1800 - 1st Battalion 17th Regiment Madras Native Infantry
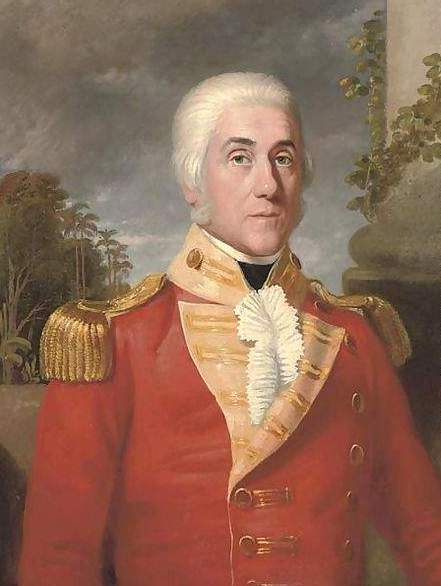
  Major General George Wahab (1752-1808), Colonel of 1st Battalion 17th Regiment, Madras Native Infantry (93rd Burma Infantry).
- 1824 - 33rd Regiment Madras Native Infantry
- 1885 - 33rd Regiment Madras Infantry
- 1890 - 3rd Regiment Burma Infantry
- 1891 - 33rd Regiment (3rd Burma Battalion) Madras Infantry
- 1901 - 33rd Burma Infantry
- 1903 - 93rd Burma Infantry
- 1922 - 5th (Burma) Battalion 8th Punjab Regiment or 5/8th Punjab
- 1956 - 5th Battalion The Baluch Regiment or 5 Baluch
- 1991 - 5th Battalion The Baloch Regiment or 5 Baloch

== See also ==
- The Baloch Regiment
- 8th Punjab Regiment
- Madras Army
- Travancore War
