= 90th Punjabis =

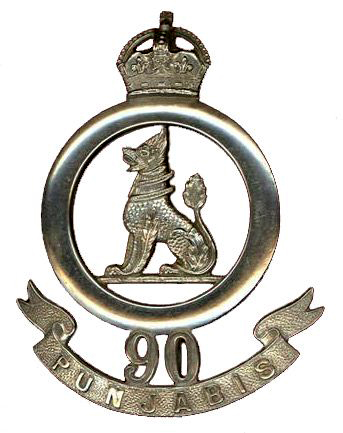
- Active: 1903–1922
- Country: British India
- Branch: British Indian Army
- Type: Infantry
- Size: 2 Battalions
- Uniform: Drab; faced blue Red; faced white before 1897
- Engagements: Third Anglo-Maratha War 1817–19; First Anglo-Burmese War 1824–26; Second Anglo-Burmese War 1852–53; Indian Rebellion of 1857; Second Afghan War 1878–80; Third Anglo-Burmese War 1885–87; Pacification of Upper Burma 1890–96; World War I 1914–18 (Mesopotamia); Third Afghan War 1919

Commanders
- Colonel of the Regiment: Lt Gen W Osborn

The 90th Punjabis were an infantry regiment of the British Indian Army. The regiment was raised in 1799 as a battalion of Madras Native Infantry. It was designated as the 90th Punjabis in 1903 and became 2nd Battalion 8th Punjab Regiment in 1922. In 1947, it was allocated to Pakistan Army, where it continues to exist as 2nd Battalion of The Baloch Regiment.

== Early history ==
The battalion was raised in 1799 at Masulipatam as the Masulipatam Battalion by Captain TK Crewe and was known as Crewe ki Paltan (Crewe's Battalion). In 1800, it was designated as the 2nd Battalion 15th Regiment, and in 1824, as the 30th Regiment of Madras Native Infantry. The battalion was composed mostly of Muslims, Tamils and Telugus of South India. In 1817–1819, it took part in the Third Anglo-Maratha War, and in 1824, it was dispatched to Burma, where it fought in the First Anglo-Burmese War. It returned to Burma in 1852 to participate in the Second Anglo-Burmese War. During the Great Indian Rebellion of 1857, it operated in Central India. The regiment also served in the Second Afghan War of 1878–1880 and the Third Anglo-Burmese War of 1885–1887.

In 1892, the 30th Madras Infantry was reconstituted with Punjabi Muslims, Sikhs, Rajputs, and Jats, and permanently based in Burma. Its new designation was 30th Regiment (5th Burma Battalion) of Madras Infantry. In 1901, its title was changed to 30th Burma Infantry. The Burma Battalions were special units raised to police the new territories acquired in the Third Anglo-Burmese War and pacify the rebellious hill tribes inhabiting the frontier regions of Burma. Between 1892 and 1894, the regiment operated in the Chin Hills against recalcitrant hill tribes.

== 90th Punjabis ==
Subsequent to the reforms brought about in the Indian Army by Lord Kitchener in 1903, all former Madras units had 60 added to their numbers. Consequently, the regiment's designation was changed to 90th Punjabis, the latter part reflecting the new class composition of the regiment, which it had acquired in 1892. In 1910, the Burma Battalions were delocalized from Burma and in 1911, the regiment moved to Nasirabad in India, where it was stationed on the outbreak of First World War.

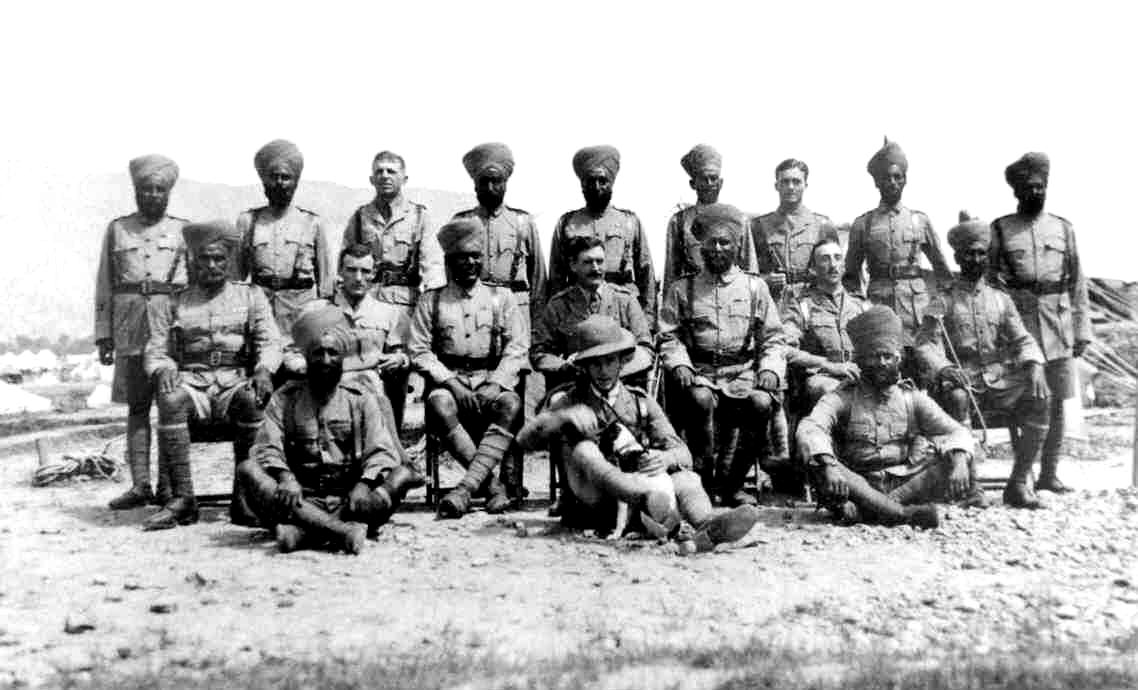
The 1st Battalion 90th Punjabis at Thal, NWFP, 1919.

During the First World War, the 90th Punjabis served in Mesopotamia, where they arrived in January 1915, as part of the 12th Indian Brigade. After serving in the Persian Arabistan with the 12th Indian Division, the regiment moved to the Euphrates Front in July. For the rest of the war, it operated on the Euphrates Line with 15th Indian Division and fought with great distinction in the Battle of Nasiriyah, the action of As Sahilan, the Second Battle of Ramadi and the action of Khan Baghdadi.

During the war, the 90th Punjabis suffered 452 casualties including 158 killed and were awarded a number of gallantry awards. Soon after returning home, the regiment was again called out to serve in the Third Afghan War in 1919. In 1918, 90th Punjabis raised a second battalion, which saw service in the Third Afghan War and took part in operations in Waziristan in 1920-21. The 2nd Battalion was disbanded in 1922.

== Subsequent history ==
After the First World War, the 90th Punjabis were grouped with the 91st and 92nd Punjabis, 93rd Burma Infantry and the two battalions of 89th Punjabis to form the 8th Punjab Regiment in 1922. The 90th Punjabis became the 2nd Battalion of the new regiment. During the Second World War, 2/8th Punjab returned to their old hunting grounds of Burma, where once again, they fought with great gallantry in the Burma Campaign. In 1947, the 8th Punjab Regiment was allocated to Pakistan Army. In 1956, it was merged with the Baluch Regiment and 2/8th Punjab was redesignated as 2 Baluch (now 2 Baloch). During the Indo-Pakistani Wars of 1965 and 1971, the battalion distinguished itself on the Sialkot and Lahore Fronts. Now the unit is in Lahore (Punjab).

== Genealogy ==
- 1799 - Masulipatam Battalion Madras Native Infantry
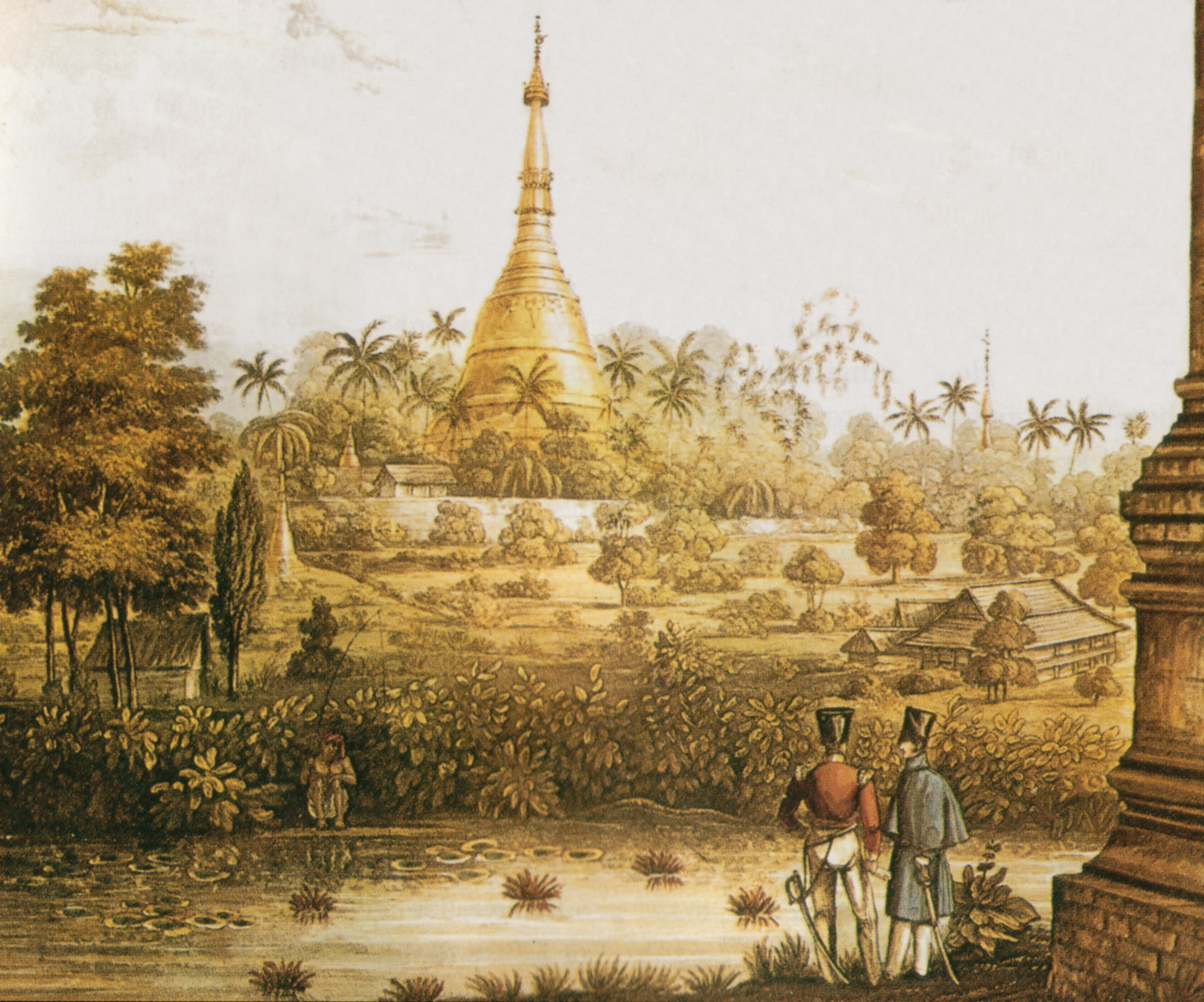
  The Shwedagon Pagoda. A colored lithograph from 1825 made during the First Anglo-Burmese War 1824–1826.
- 1800 - 2nd Battalion 15th Regiment Madras Native Infantry
- 1824 - 30th Regiment Madras Native Infantry
- 1885 - 30th Regiment Madras Infantry
- 1892 - 30th Regiment (5th Burma Battalion) Madras Infantry
- 1901 - 30th Burma Infantry
- 1903 - 90th Punjabis
- 1918 - 1st Battalion 90th Punjabis or 1/90th Punjabis
- 1922 - 2nd Battalion 8th Punjab Regiment or 2/8th Punjab
- 1956 - 2nd Battalion The Baluch Regiment or 2 Baluch
- 1991 - 2nd Battalion The Baloch Regiment 2 Baloch

== See also ==
- Baloch Regiment
- 8th Punjab Regiment
- Madras Army
