= Bikaner Camel Corps =

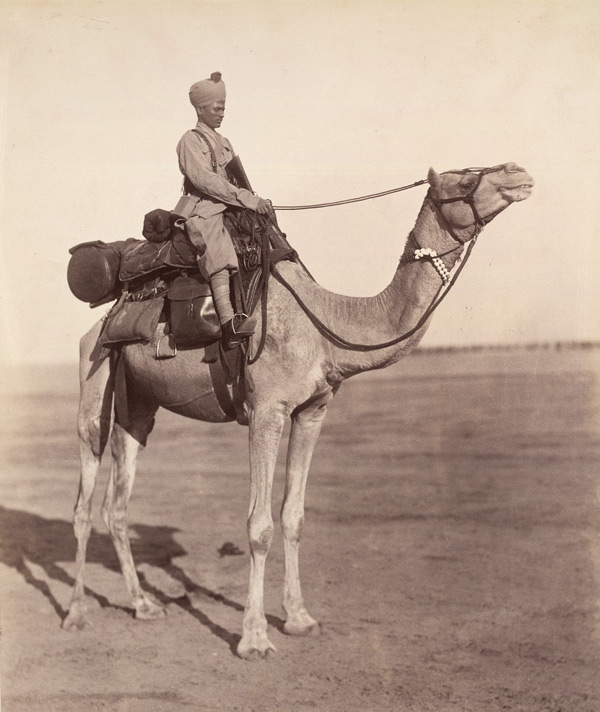
- A sowar of the Bikaner Camel Corps on his mount showing details of kit
- Active: 1889 - to date (The Ganga Jaisalmer Risala was dismounted in 1974 and underwent conversion into standard infantry.)
- Country: British India Later India
- Branch: Cavalry
- Type: Camel Cavalry

The Bikaner Camel Corps was a unit of Imperial Service Troops from India that fought for the Allies in World War I and World War II.

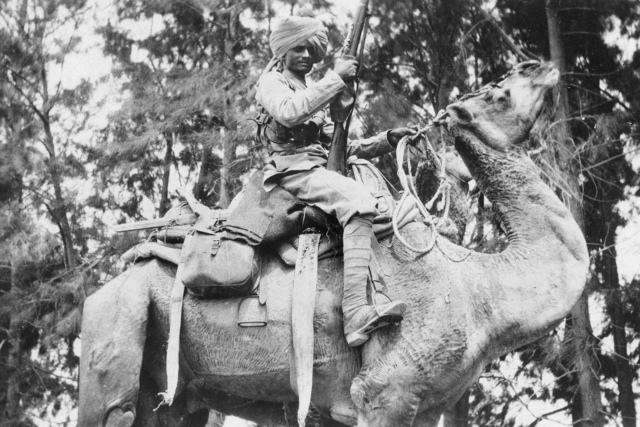
Bikaner camel corps

The Corps was founded by Maharaja Ganga Singh of the Indian state of Bikaner, as the Ganga Risala after the British government of India accepted his offer to raise a force of 500 soldiers. The state of Bikaner had a long tradition of using soldiers mounted on camels. For instance, in 1465 Rao Bika led a force of 300 sowar (or camel riders) to conquer neighbouring territories. Ganga Singh led the Ganga Risala when it fought in the Boxer Rebellion in China in 1900, in Somaliland in 1902-1904 in failed effort at defeating the Somali Uprising and in Egypt in World War I. At the Suez Canal in 1915 the corps routed the opposing Turkish forces in a camel cavalry charge. The Corps fought in the Middle East in World War II, when it was supported by the camel-mounted Bijay Battery, which became a mule team battery.

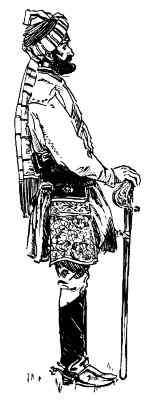
An Indian Officer of the Camel Corps

After India's Independence the Bikaner Camel Corps was merged with camel troops from Jaisalmer in 1951 to become the Ganga Jaisalmer Risala and joined The Grenadiers as the 13th Battalion. It took part in the actions to foil Pakistani raiders in the Bikaner and Jaisalmer regions during the Indo-Pakistani War of 1965.

After 1975 all of the Indian Military Camel Corps, including the Ganga Jaisalmer Risala, were disbanded. A brief attempt was made to resurrect them but the plan never came to fruition. The Ganga Risala still survives though as a part of the Border Security Force, retaining the name Bikaner Camel Corps. While primarily employed for ceremonial purposes, it is one of the few camel cavalry units still retained by present-day armed forces.

The Ganga Jaisalmer Risala was dismounted in 1974 and underwent conversion into standard infantry. The Mortar borne troops went on to became 44 Field Battery of Regiments of Artillery. The battery is a part of 38 Medium Regiment and uses the soubriquet of “Ganga Risala Battery”. It continues to serve as a regular infantry battalion under the name 13 Grenadiers (Ganga Jaisalmer). Post 1971 the unit has seen action in counter insurgency operations in the states of Punjab and Assam. It has to its credit one Kirti Chakra and one Shaurya Chakra among numerous other awards.

== Sources ==
- Crump, Vivien; Toh, Irene (1996). Rajasthan. London: Everyman Guides. ISBN 978-1-85715-887-8.
- Rikhye, Ravi (2003). "The Indian Army's Camel Troops 1948–75". Orders of Battle. Archived from the original on 14 June 2006.
