= Parkash Singh =

Indian soldier and Victoria Cross recipient (1913–1991)

- Havildar Parkash Singh, VC, 8th Punjab Regiment.
- Born: 31 March 1913; Lyallpur District, British India
- Died: 23 March 1991 (aged 77); Ealing, London
- Military career
- Allegiance: (British Raj) British India; India
- Branch: British Indian Army (1936-1947); Indian Army (1947-1968)
- Service years: 1936-1968
- Rank: Jemadar (British Indian Army); Major (Indian Army)
- Service number: 14696 (enlisted); SS-14772 (short-service commission); IC-6070 (regular commission)
- Units: 8th Punjab Regiment; Sikh Regiment
- Conflicts: Third Waziristan Campaign; World War II; Burma campaign
- Awards: Victoria Cross

Major Parkash Singh VC (31 March 1913 – 23 March 1991) was a Sikh Indian recipient of the Victoria Cross, the highest and most prestigious award for gallantry in the face of the enemy that can be awarded to British and Commonwealth forces.

== Biography ==
Parkash Singh was born on 31 March 1913 in Sharikar village, in the Lyallpur District of what was British India (now modern Pakistan) into a Jat Sikh family. He enlisted in the 8th Punjab Regiment of the British Indian Army on 21 November 1936, seeing service on the North-West Frontier. During the Second World War, Singh was a 28-year-old Havildar serving in the Bren Gun Carrier Platoon of 5th Battalion 8th Punjab Regiment, British Indian Army (now 5th Battalion The Baloch Regiment of Pakistan Army). In January 1943, his battalion was engaged in fighting on the Mayu Peninsula in the Arakan, Burma, against Japanese forces, when the following deed took place for which he was awarded the VC:

On 6 January 1943, the Bren Gun Carrier Platoon of 5/8th Punjab was attacked by a strong Japanese patrol near Donbaik on the Mayu Peninsula. The Platoon Commander was wounded and was forced to retire, handing over the command to Havildar Parkash Singh. Parkash Singh noticed two other carriers bogged down in a nullah, and under heavy Japanese fire. He immediately rushed to the rescue of the stricken carriers; calling on their crews to abandon the vehicles and run for safety while he provided covering fire. When his Bren gunner was wounded, he took control of the gun from him, and charged towards the enemy. Driving with one hand and firing the Bren gun with the other, he drove them out of their fixed positions. As he returned to pick the crews of the stranded carriers, he came under heavy enemy fire, but calmly rescued all eight men. On 19 January, the battalion carriers again came under heavy anti-tank fire in the same area, and several of them were destroyed including that of the Platoon Commander. The crews of the destroyed vehicles were given up for dead, and the rest of the carriers withdrew. But Parkash Singh wanted to see for himself if there were any survivors among the burning wrecks. Driving down the beach under intense enemy fire, he found the officer and his driver in their badly damaged carrier. The men were too badly injured to be moved, so Parkash Singh decided to tow their vehicle to safety. Despite the order of his Platoon Commander to go back and save himself, the fearless NCO rigged a makeshift tow chain and secured it to the damaged carrier, all the time exposed to enemy fire, and then towed it back to safety. For his feats of cool courage and selfless devotion on 6 and 19 January 1943, Havildar Parkash Singh was awarded the Victoria Cross although the initial recommendation was for a VC and Bar.

On 15 August 1943, Singh was commissioned in the VCO (Viceroy's Commissioned Officer - the present-day Junior Commissioned Officer) rank of jemadar (now naib subedar), with the war-substantive rank of subedar. Singh remained in the Indian Army post-Independence, transferring to the Sikh Regiment as 8 Punjab had been allotted to the Pakistan Army. Effective 19 July 1948, he was selected for a short-service commission in the rank of lieutenant (seniority from 19 July 1946), and received a regular commission in the same rank on 6 October 1952. He was promoted to captain and then to major on 19 July 1961, retiring on 21 November 1968 after 32 years of service. He died in 1991 aged 77, whilst undergoing heart surgery in England, at Ealing, London. His Victoria Cross is displayed at the Imperial War Museum, London.

== Awards ==

Raksha Medal
Samanya Seva Medal	General Service Medal 1947	Indian Independence Medal	Victoria Cross
1939–45 Star	Burma Star	War Medal 1939-1945	India Service Medal
General Service Medal (1918)	India General Service Medal (1936)	Queen Elizabeth II Coronation Medal	Queen Elizabeth II Silver Jubilee Medal
