= Charles James William Grant =

Recipient of the Victoria Cross

Charles James William Grant VC
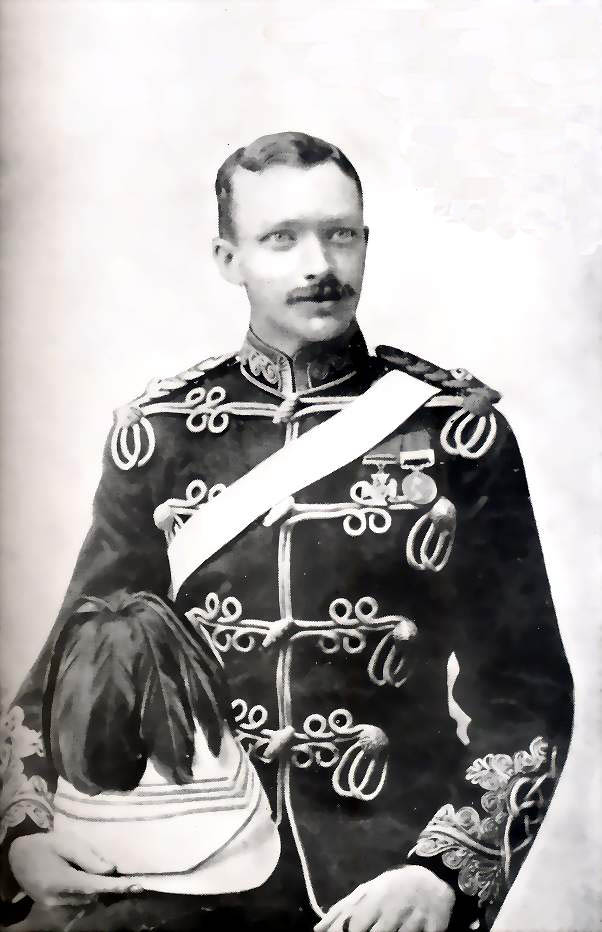
- Born: 14 October 1861; Bourtie, Aberdeenshire
- Died: 23 November 1932 (aged 71); Sidmouth, Devon
- Burial place: Sidmouth Cemetery
- Military career
- Allegiance: United Kingdom
- Branch: British Indian Army
- Rank: Colonel
- Units: Suffolk Regiment; Madras Staff Corps; Indian Staff Corps
- Commands: 89th Punjabis; 92nd Punjabis
- Conflicts: Anglo-Manipur War; Third Anglo-Burmese War; First World War
- Awards: Victoria Cross

Colonel Charles James William Grant VC (14 October 1861 – 23 November 1932) was a Scottish recipient of the Victoria Cross, the highest and most prestigious award for gallantry in the face of the enemy that can be awarded to British and Commonwealth forces.

== Details ==
Charles Grant was born in Bourtie, Aberdeenshire, Scotland. He attended the Royal Military College, Sandhurst, before being commissioned into the Suffolk Regiment on 10 May 1882.

He was 29 years old, and a lieutenant in the Indian Staff Corps, Indian Army during the Anglo-Manipur War when the following deed took place for which he was awarded the VC. In March 1891, during a revolt in the eastern Indian State of Manipur, James Wallace Quinton, the resident Frank Grimwood and other British officers were murdered, while others were imprisoned. Lieutenant CJW Grant of the Madras Staff Corps with a detachment of eighty Punjabi and Gurkha soldiers was stationed at the border post of Tamu, some 55 miles from Manipur. On hearing about the incident on 28 March, he immediately marched with his detachment for relief of the survivors. On 31 March, he arrived at Thoubal about 15 miles from Imphal and immediately attacked and captured the village. He then proceeded to entrench his force. Next day, the Manipuris advanced towards Thoubal in force. Without waiting for the enemy to attack, Lieutenant Grant with forty men went out to meet them and forming up, opened fire. For the next nine days, the intrepid young officer and his gallant men repulsed repeated attacks. Always keeping the initiative, and surprising the Manipuris with sallies, he inflicted heavy casualties and thoroughly demoralized them. Several offers of truce and safe passage were spurned by him. On 9 April, he received orders to withdraw towards a British force, which was then advancing towards Manipur. Eighty men had defied the entire army of a state for more than a week, losing just one man killed and four wounded, including Lieutenant Grant. The lieutenant and his men joined the relieving force and took further part in fighting during which he was again wounded. The British entered Imphal (Kangla) on 26 April, bringing an end to the war. For his conspicuous bravery, inspirational leadership and devotion to duty, Lieutenant Charles Grant was awarded the Victoria Cross.

His citation in the London Gazette reads:

For the conspicuous bravery and devotion to his country displayed by him in having, upon hearing on the 27th March, 1891, of the disaster at Manipur, at once volunteered to attempt the relief of the British Captives, with 80 Native Soldiers, and having advanced with the greatest intrepidity, captured Thobal, near Manipur, and held it against a large force of the enemy. Lieutenant Grant inspired his men with equal heroism, by an ever-present example of personal daring and resource.

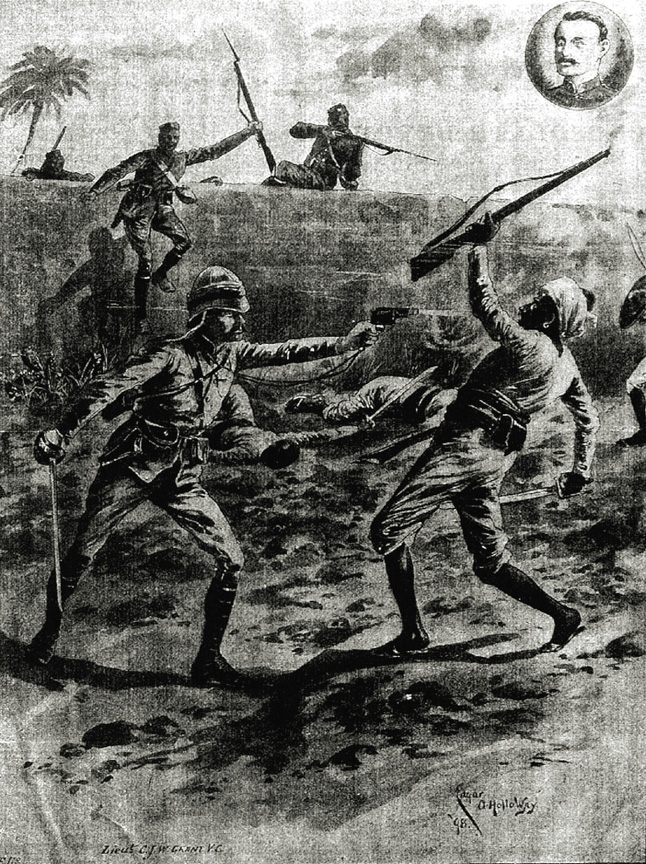
Action by Lieutenant CJW Grant, VC, at Thobal, Manipur, 1 April 1891.

He later achieved the rank of brevet colonel and commanded the 89th and 92nd Punjabis (now 1st & 4th Battalions The Baloch Regiment, Pakistan Army). He retired in 1911 and returned to England. He rejoined the army during the First World War, acting as a draft conducting officer. He lived in Sidmouth, Devon, where he died in 1932, aged 71.

On 24 June 2021, it was reported that Grant's VC was sold at auction along with other historically important items to an unnamed bidder for £420,000.

== See also ==
- List of Brigade of Gurkhas recipients of the Victoria Cross
- Ethel Grimwood
