= Raid on the Suez Canal =

1915 failed Ottoman attack during WWI

- Part of the Sinai and Palestine campaign
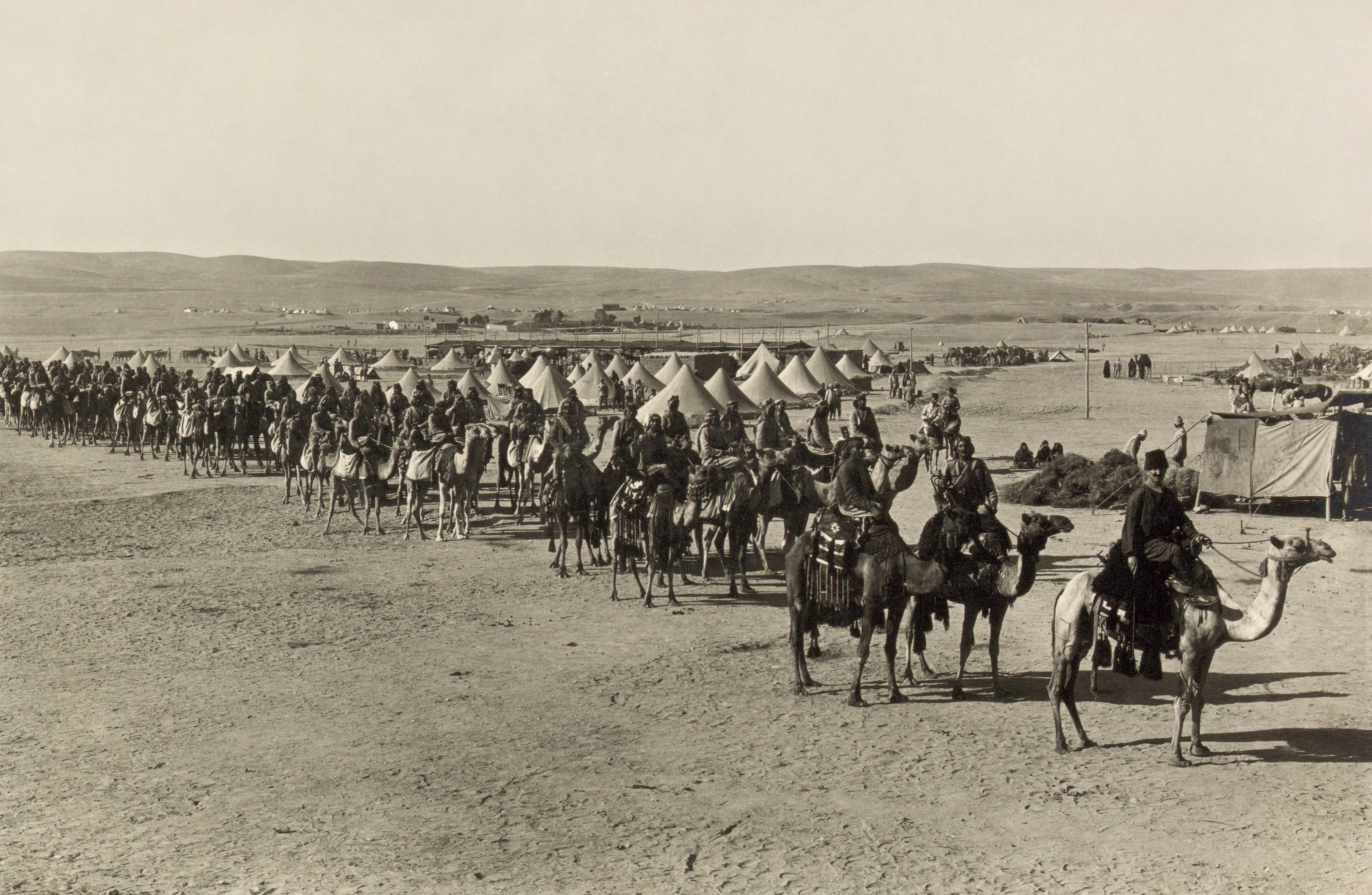
- Ottoman camel corps at Beersheba, 1915
Date	26 January – 4 February 1915 (1 week and 2 days)
Location	Suez Canal, Egypt
Result	British victory

Belligerents
British Empire: Egypt; India; United Kingdom	Ottoman Empire: German Empire (military officers)

Commanders and leaders
(British Empire) John Maxwell	(Ottoman Empire) Djemal Pasha (German Empire) F. K. von Kressenstein

Strength
30,000	25,000; Other estimates: 11,400 (400 officers and 11,000 soldiers)

Casualties and losses
32 killed 130 wounded	784 killed or wounded 716 captured

The raid on the Suez Canal, also known as actions on the Suez Canal, took place between 26 January and 4 February 1915 when a German-led Ottoman force advanced from southern Palestine to attack the British Empire-protected Suez Canal, marking the beginning of the Sinai and Palestine campaign (1915–1918) of World War I (1914–1918).

Substantial Ottoman forces crossed the Sinai Peninsula, and a few managed to cross the Canal. The primary objective of the Ottoman forces was not to capture British Egypt, but to seize the Suez Canal. Capturing this strategically vital channel would cut British communications with East Africa, India and Asia, and prevent British Empire troops from reaching the Mediterranean Sea and Europe. The Ottoman attack was a failure with the loss of nearly 2,000 troops.

== Background ==
Since its opening in 1869 the Suez Canal had featured prominently in British policy and concerns. Among the great advantages it provided were a line of communication and also the site for a military base; the well equipped ports at Alexandria and Port Said made the region particularly useful. However, the Egyptian public was becoming increasingly opposed to the British occupation of Egypt, in particular various policies and judgments issued by Britain during the occupation.

The Convention of Constantinople of 1888 by the European great powers guaranteed freedom of navigation of the Suez Canal. In August 1914 Egypt was defended by 5,000 men of the Force in Egypt.

== Prelude ==
Abbas Hilmi, the reigning Khedive, who had opposed the British occupation, was out of the country when the war started. When the British declared the Protectorate on 18 December 1914 they deposed Abbas Hilmi and promoted Prince Hussein Kamel as the Sultan of Egypt. The population agreed to these changes while the outcome of the war was unknown and the fighting continued.

From 2 August 1914 when the Ottoman armies mobilised, Brigadier General Zekki Pasha commanding the Ottoman Fourth Army at Damascus was planning to attack the Suez Canal, with the support of Djemal Pasha Commander in Chief of Syria and Palestine.

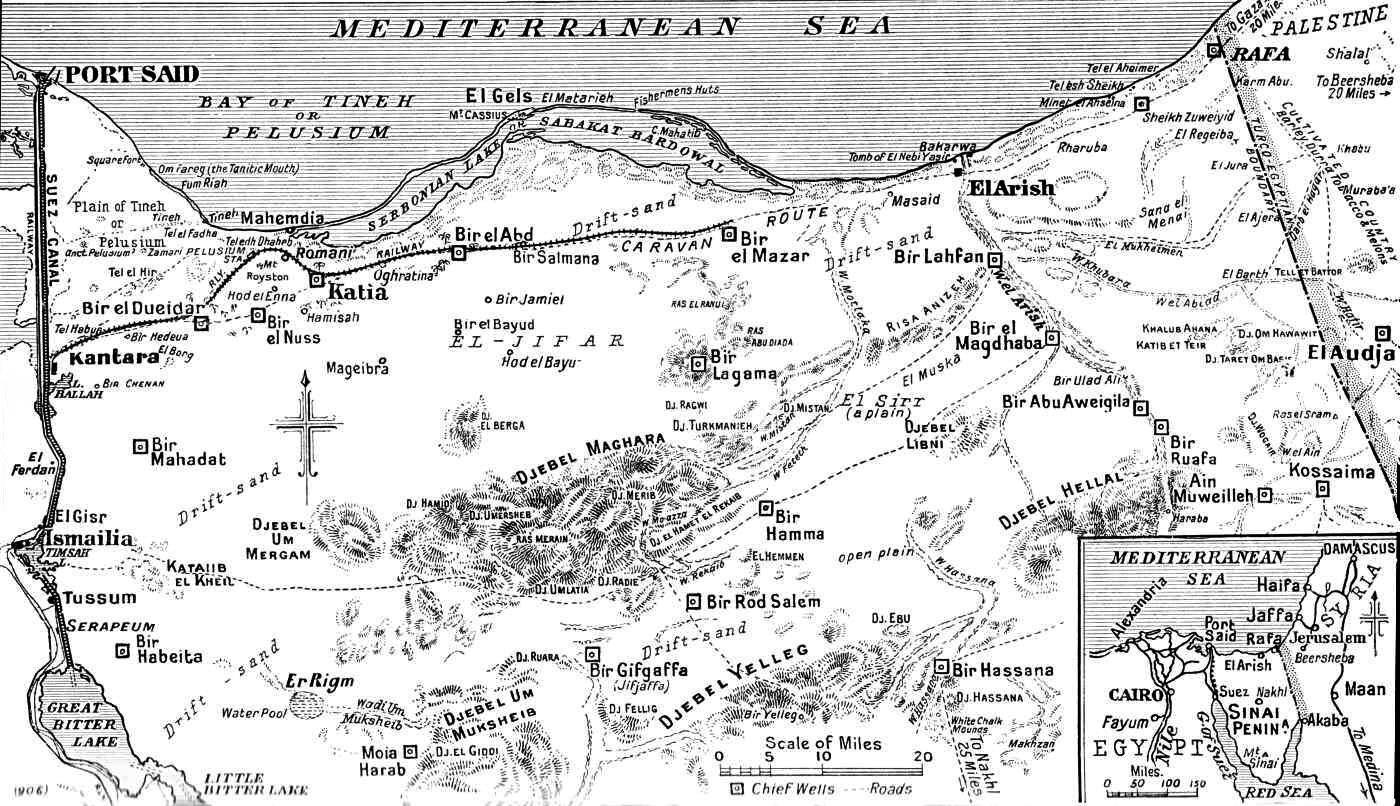
Suez and Sinai region 1917

The first hostilities occurred on 20 November when a 20-man patrol of the Bikaner Camel Corps was attacked at Bir en Nuss 20 miles (32 km) east of Qantara by 200 Bedouin. The Bikaner Camel Corps lost more than half their patrol. By December El Arish was occupied by an Ottoman force and the defence of the Suez Canal was organised. There had been a pre-war suggestion that a force of camels could hold Nekhel just to the south and in the centre of the Ottoman Empire and Egyptian frontier. The difficulty of supporting such a force of camels from bases on the western side of the Suez Canal was recognised when the decision was made that "the obvious line of actual defence of the eastern frontier of Egypt is the Suez Canal."

=== Suez Canal defences ===
The 100 miles (160 km) long canal had a railway running along its whole length and was supplied with water from the west, as only brackish wells could be found to the east. The length of the canal included about 29 miles (47 km) of the Great and Little Bitter Lakes and Lake Timsah, which divided the three sectors organised for the defence. These were,

1. Suez to the Bitter Lakes
2. Deversoir to El Ferdan
3. El Ferdan to Port Said

with headquarters and a general reserve at Ismailia, while small detachments guarded the Sweet Water Canal and the Zagazig supply depot on the main Ismailia to Cairo road.

On 25 November, cutting the canal bank at Port Said flooded a portion of the desert stretching to El Kab, shortening the northern stretch of the canal by 20 miles (32 km). On 2 January, another major cutting in the Asiatic bank north of Qantara enabled minor inundations between Qantara and Ismailia.

On 15 January 1915

Sector I Headquarters at Suez

30th Indian Brigade (the 24th and 76th Punjabis, the 126th Baluchistan Infantry and the 2/7th Gurkha Rifles)
1 Squadron Imperial Service Cavalry Brigade
1 Company Bikaner Camel Corps
half a company of Sappers and Miners
1 Battery Royal Field Artillery (RFA)
1 Indian Field Ambulance

These troops were deployed at the Esh Shat, Baluchistan, El Kubri, Gurkha, Shallufa, Geneffe and Suez posts.

Sector II Headquarters at Ismailia Old Camp

22nd (Lucknow) Brigade (the 62nd and 92nd Punjabis and the 2/10th Gurkha Rifles)
28th Indian Brigade (the 51st Sikhs (Frontier Force) and 53rd Sikhs, the 56th Punjabis and the 1/5th Gurkha Rifles)
1 Squadron Imperial Service Cavalry Brigade
Bikaner Camel Corps (less three and a half companies)
Machine Gun Section of Egyptian Camel Corps
1 Brigade of Territorial RFA
1 Battery Indian Mountain Artillery
2 Field Ambulances

These troops were deployed at the Deversoir, Serapeum East, Serapeum West, Tussum, Gebel Mariam, Ismailia Ferry and Ismailia Old Camp posts.

Sector III Headquarters at Qantara

29th Indian Brigade (the 14th Sikhs, the 69th and 89th Punjabis and the 1/6th Gurkha Rifles)
1 Battalion 22nd Brigade
1 Squadron Imperial Service Cavalry Brigade
half a company of Sappers and Miners
2 Batteries of Territorial Royal Field Artillery (RFA)
26th Battery Mountain Artillery
Armoured train with half company Indian Infantry
Territorial Wireless Section
Indian Field Ambulance
Detachment of Territorial R.A.M.C.

These troops were deployed at the Ballah, Qantara East, Qantara West, El Kab, Tina, Ras El Esh, Salt Works, New Canal Works and Port Said posts.

- Zagazig Advanced Ordnance Depot was defended by one battalion, 32nd (Imperial Service) Brigade
- Sweet Water Canal and the railway were defended by 1 Troop Imperial Service Cavalry Brigade, a half company of Bikaner Camel Corps and a half company of Indian Infantry
- Moascar General Reserve was formed by:

31st Indian Brigade (the 2nd Queen Victoria's Own Rajput Light Infantry), the 27th Punjabis, the 93rd Burma Infantry and the 128th Pioneers
32nd (Imperial Service) Brigade (the 33rd Punjabis, Alwar, Gwalior and Patiala Infantry)
Imperial Service Cavalry Brigade (less three squadrons and one troop)
1 Egyptian R. E. Section (Camels)
1 Egyptian Mountain Battery
2 Sections Field Artillery with Cavalry Brigade
3 Indian Field Ambulances. This force would be supported by warships located in the Suez Canal and the lakes.

Located at these series of posts were trenches with sand bag revetments, protected by barbed wire on the eastern bank of the canal mainly covering ferries with an extensive bridgehead at Ismailia Ferry Post. Three floating bridges were constructed, at Ismailia, Kubri and Qantara. On the western bank trenches were dug at intervals between the posts.

These defences were augmented by the presence in the Suez Canal of HMS Swiftsure, HMS Clio, HMS Minerva, the armed merchant cruiser Himalaya and HMS Ocean near Qantara, Ballah, Sallufa, Gurka Post and Esh Shatt respectively, with the French protected cruiser D'Entrecasteaux just north of the Great Bitter Lake, HMS Proserpine at Port Said, the Royal Indian Marine Ship Hardinge south of Lake Timsah and north of Tussum, with the French coastal defence ship Requin in Lake Timsah. The canal was closed each night during the threat.

Two battalions of the 32nd (Imperial Service) Brigade were deployed north of Lake Timsah to Ballah in Sector II commanded by Brigadier General H.D. Watson with the New Zealand Infantry Brigade and the Otago and Wellington Battalions reinforcing Sector I.

To protect their strategic interests, by January 1915 the British had assembled some 130,000 troops in Egypt. Major-General Sir John Maxwell, a veteran of Egypt and Sudan, was commander-in-chief and led mostly British Indian Army divisions, together with the 42nd (East Lancashire) Division, local formations and the Australian and New Zealand Army Corps. 30,000 of the troops stationed in Egypt manned defences along the Suez Canal. The Ottomans had only three available routes to reach the Suez Canal through the road-less and waterless Sinai Peninsula. A coastal advance that would have water supplies and usable tracks, but would be within range of Royal Navy warships. A central route from Beersheba to Ismailia or a southern track between El Kossaima and the Suez Canal. The central route was chosen as it would provide the Ottoman soldiers with proper tracks to follow once they crossed the canal.

=== Attacking force ===
The Bavarian Colonel Kress von Kressenstein had been appointed Chief of Staff of the VIII Corps, Fourth Army on arrival from Constantinople on 18 November 1914. The VIII Corps comprised five infantry divisions, the 8th, 10th, 23rd, 25th, and 27th with contingents from Sinai Bedouins, Druzes, Kurds, Mohadjirs, Circassians from Syria and Arabs. These Muslim contingents were to foment revolt against the British in Egypt. In January 1915 Kress von Kressenstein's force concentrated 20,000 men in southern Palestine with nine field batteries and one battery of 5.9 inch (15 cm) howitzers. (Note: Kress von Kressenstein claims this force left Beersheba in mid January in "two echelons." [quoted in Falls 1930 Vol. 1 p. 34])

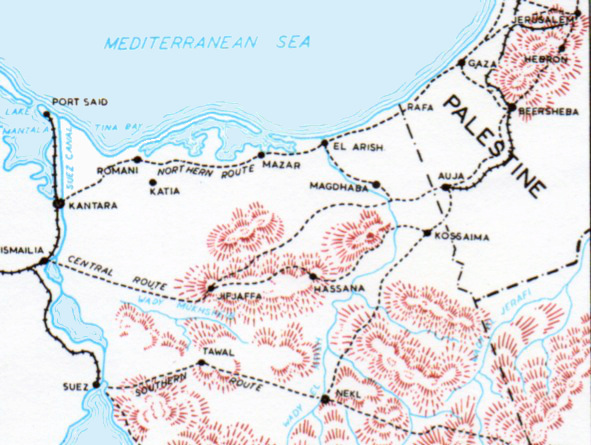
Map shows the 3 ways across the Sinai Peninsula from el Aujah

This force which was to cross the Sinai comprised the 10th Infantry Division and a cavalry regiment and the first echelon of about 13,000 infantrymen including the 23rd, 25th and 27th Divisions with 1,500 Arabs and eight batteries of field artillery. A second echelon of 12,000 infantrymen was made up of 20th and 23rd Divisions. The plan was for a single infantry division to capture Ismailia and cross the canal before being reinforced by a second infantry division which would be supported on the east bank of the canal by two additional divisions. A further division would be available to reinforce the bridgehead on the west bank of the Suez Canal.

The Ottoman Empire constructed a branch railway line from the Jaffa–Jerusalem railway at Ramleh running south to reach Sileh about 275 miles (443 km) from the Suez Canal during the autumn of 1914. The 100 miles (160 km) stretch of the railway to Beersheba was opened on 17 October 1915. By May 1916 it had been extended on to Hafir El Auja then south across the Egyptian frontier, to almost reached the Wadi el Arish in December 1916 when the Battle of Magdhaba was fought. German engineers directed the construction of stone Ashlar bridges and culverts along this railway line built to move large numbers of troops long distances quickly and keep them supplied many miles from base.

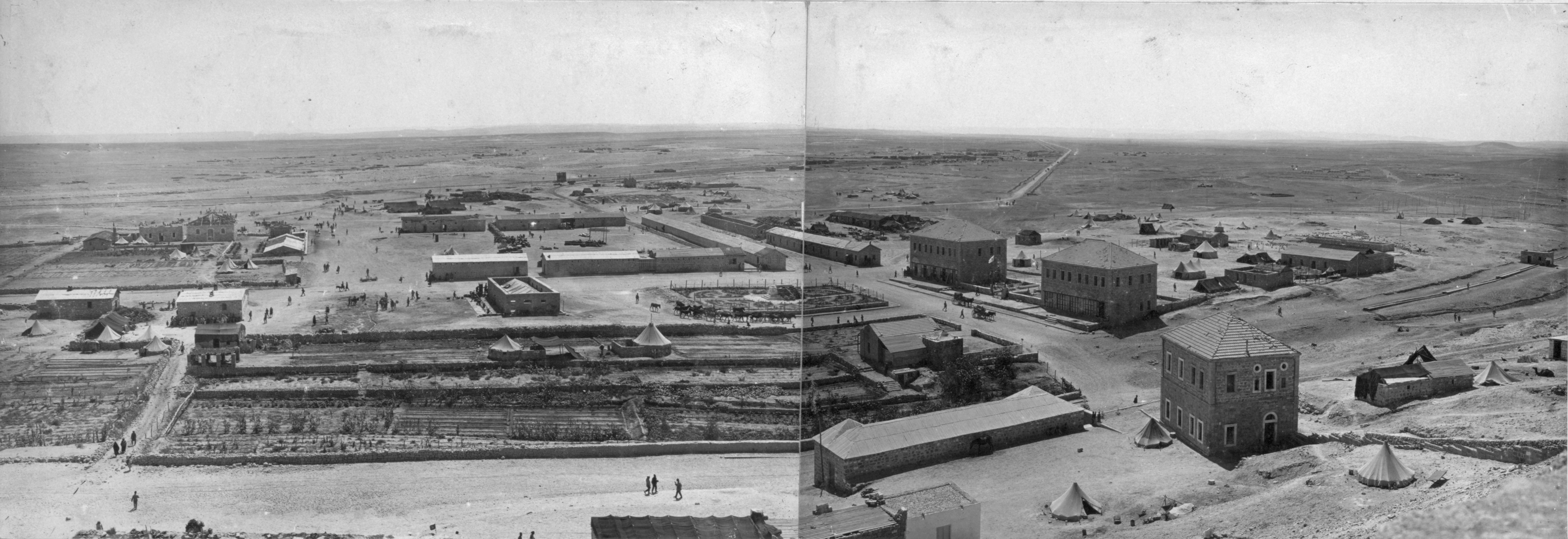
Ottoman military town of Hafir el Aujah, the Principal Desert Base

Any attack on the Suez Canal would require artillery and a bridging train to be dragged across the desert. Two Ottoman divisions plus one more in reserve, with camel and horse units, were ready to depart in mid-January. The advance across the Sinai took ten days, tracked by British aircraft, even though German aircraft stationed in Palestine in turn aided the Ottomans and later flew some bombing missions in support of the main attack. Kress von Kressenstein's force moved south by rail, continuing on foot via el Auja carrying iron pontoons for crossing and attacking the Suez Canal at Serapeum and Tussum.

It was known at Force in Egypt headquarters that the 10th, 23rd and 27th Divisions had assembled near Beersheba. By 11 January Nekhl had been occupied by a small Ottoman force. On 13 January 1915 it was known to the British that strong columns were passing through el Auja and El Arish. On 25 January one regiment was reported to be approaching Qantara. The next day a force of 6,000 soldiers was reported 25 miles (40 km) east of the Little Bitter Lake at Moiya Harab when defenders at Qantara were fired on by part of the approaching force. On 27 January the El Arish to Qantara road was cut 5 miles (8.0 km) to the east and Baluchistan and Kubri posts were attacked.

The force had moved towards the Suez Canal in three echelons; the main group along the central route with smaller forces on the northern and southern routes. The northern group of about 3,000 men moved via Magdhaba to El Arish and thence along the northern route towards Port Said. The central group of about 6,000 or 7,000 men moved via the water cisterns at Moiya Harab and the wells at Wady um Muksheib and Jifjafa towards Ismailia. This was at the midpoint of the Suez Canal near the vital British railway and water pumping equipment. The main force marched from Beersheba through El Auja and Ibni, between the Maghara and Yelleg hills to Jifjafa and Ismailia. The third group of about 3,000 moved via Nekl southwards towards the town of Suez at the southern end of the Suez Canal. (Note: The actual size of the Ottoman force Kress von Kressenstein lead across the Sinai in January 1915 is difficult to gauge from the numbers provided; 50,000 became 25,000 then 20,000 and finally between 10,000 and 12,000. Kress von Kressenstein stated the force was 20,000 strong. [quoted in Falls 1930 Vol. 1 p. 34]) The main force was attacked by aircraft dropping 20 pounds (9.1 kg) bombs.

Two smaller flanking columns of this Ottoman force made secondary attacks on 26 and 27 January 1915 near Qantara in the northern sector of the Suez Canal and near the town of Suez in the south.

== Battle ==
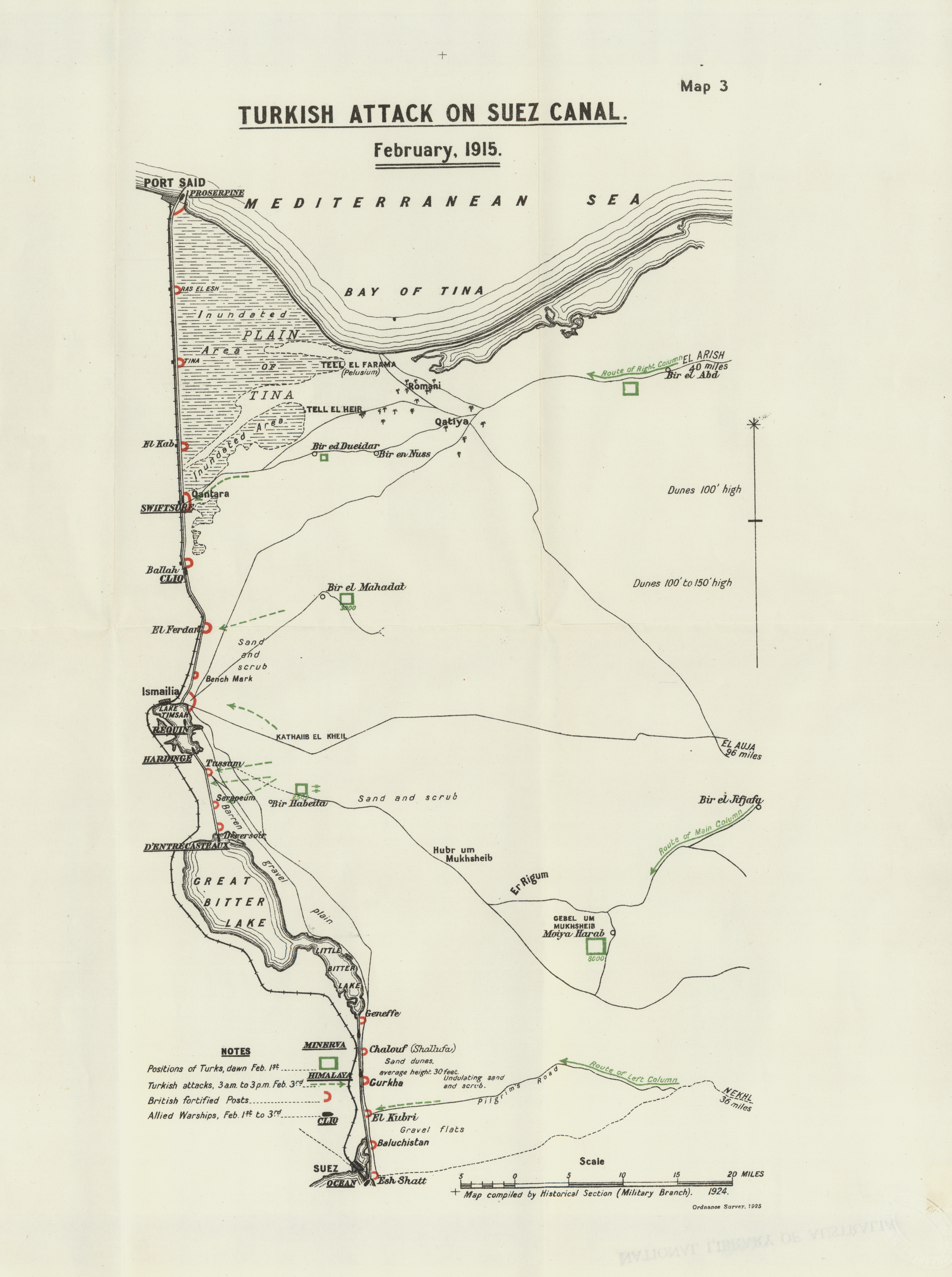
Attacks on the Suez Canal

From 31 January the British defenders expected an attack and by 1 February at least 2,500 infantry attackers were 6 miles (9.7 km) east of Serapeum with two guns, another force of 8,000 was at Moiya Harab 30 miles (48 km) to the south east and a third force of 3,000 was at Bir el Mahadat 10 miles (16 km) east north east of El Ferdan. In the rear of these forces were "considerable forces" at Bir el Abd 40 miles (64 km) from the Canal, at El Arish and at Nekhl.

The Ottoman Expeditionary Force, moving only at night, believed that it had been unnoticed, as scouts had observed British officers playing football when Ottoman forces had already established themselves in a camp 25 kilometres (16 mi) east of the Suez Canal. Kress von Kressenstein's Suez Expeditionary Force arrived at the Canal on 2 February 1915 and the Ottomans succeeded in crossing the Suez Canal about Ismailia on the morning of 3 February 1915.

By 2 February slight forward movements of the attacking force made it clear the main attack would be on the central sector, to the north or south of Lake Timsah and the armoured train with four platoons of New Zealand infantry and two platoons reinforced the 5th Gurkhas post on the east bank. The 22nd (Lucknow) Brigade (the 62nd and 92nd Punjabis and the 2/10th Gurkha Rifles) from Sector II, the 2nd Queen Victoria's Own Rajput Light Infantry, and two platoons of the 128th Pioneers from general reserve at Moascar, the 19th Lancashire Battery RFA (four 15-pounders), 5th Battery Egyptian Artillery (four mountain guns and two Maxim guns), two sections of the 1st Field Company East Lancashire Royal Engineers and the 137th Indian Field Ambulance were in position between the Great Bitter Lake and Lake Timsah.

=== 3 February ===
==== Tussum and Serapeum ====
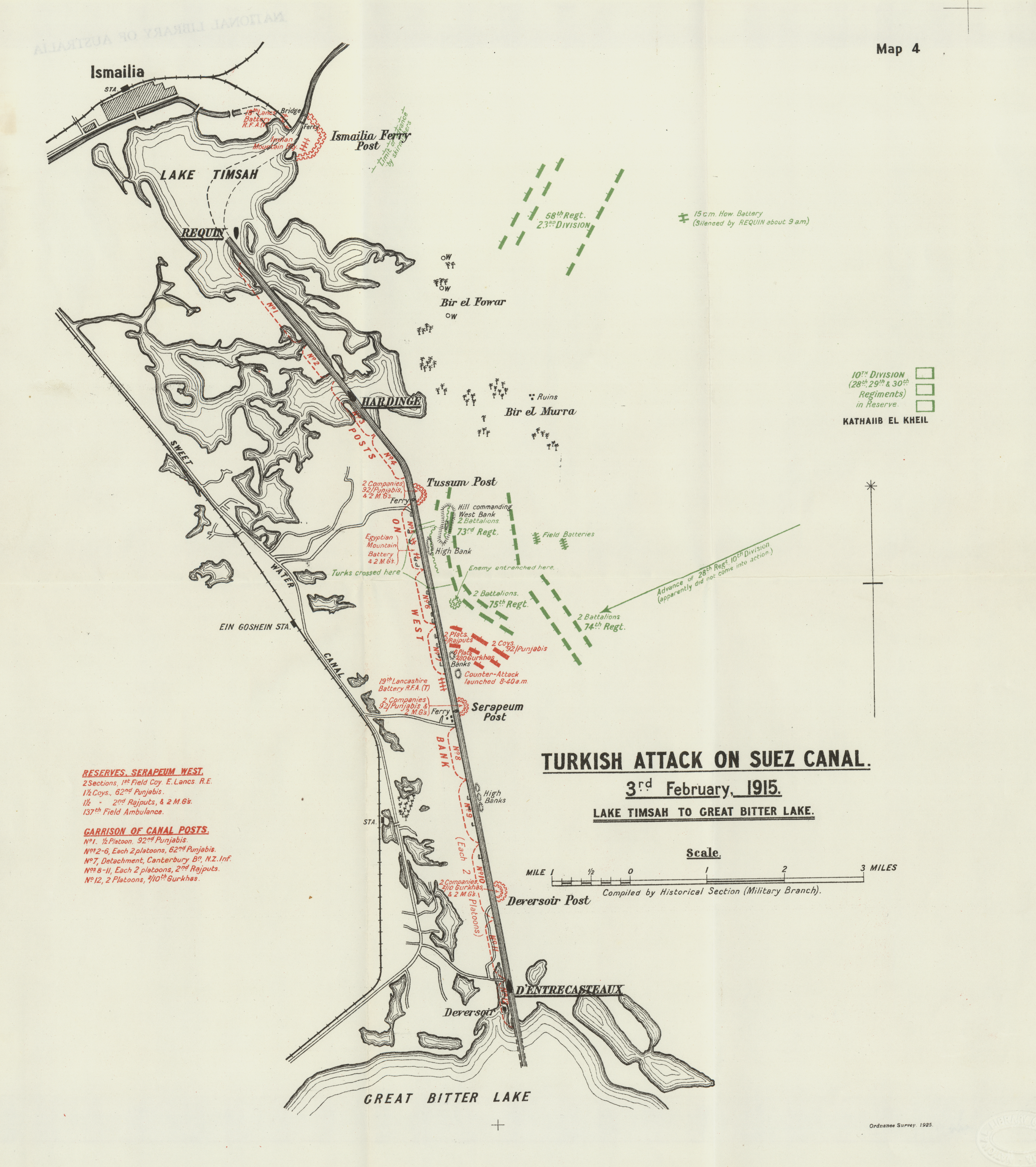
Lake Timsah to Great Bitter Lake

Squads of men were seen by the light of the moon at about 04:20 on 3 February moving pontoons and rafts towards the Suez Canal. They were fired on by an Egyptian battery, and the 62nd Punjabis along with the 128th Pioneers at Post No. 5 stopped most attempts to get their craft into the water. A further attempt along a stretch of 1.5 miles (2.4 km) to get pontoons and rafts to the canal was made slightly to the north of the first attempt. Three pontoons loaded with troops crossed the canal under cover of machine gun and rifle fire from the sand dunes on the eastern bank. As they landed on the western bank of the canal all three boat loads of soldiers were attacked and killed, wounded, or captured. As dawn lit the area, the failure of the attempt to cross the canal was complete.

At dawn, the Tussum Post was attacked supported by artillery shelling the British positions, the warships in the Canal, and the merchant shipping moored in Lake Timsah. The Hardinge and Requin opened fire on groups of infantry in the desert and an Ottoman trench 200 yards (180 m) south of Tussum Post was caught by enfilade fire from machine guns. A group of about 350 Ottoman soldiers, which occupied British day trenches located to the east and south of the post, was counterattacked during the day by the 92nd Punjabis. About 15:30 the trenches were recaptured with 287 casualties or prisoners.

At 06:00 a second attack was launched, this time by diversions north of the crossing point. The attack was checked by the defending British troops and the gunnery of the British and French ships in the canal. By 3 a.m. the Ottomans' attack had petered out and failed and a full withdrawal was effected. The thirsty Ottoman troops retreated to Beersheba, free from molestation by British forces. 600 Ottoman soldiers made it to the other side of the canal, but were taken prisoner.

By 06:30 the commander of the 22nd (Lucknow) Brigade ordered a counterattack which began to push Ottoman soldiers of the 73rd and 75th Regiments (25th Division) out of trenches and sandhills south of Tussum Post. Two companies of the 2/10th Gurkhas with machine guns moved from Deversoir to Serapeum to join six platoons of the 2nd Queen Victoria's Own Rajput Light Infantry where they crossed the canal by ferry. Two platoons of the 2nd Queen Victoria's Own Rajput Light Infantry with two platoons of the 92nd Punjabis from the post on their right began to advance up the east bank towards Tussum. This attack caused the Ottoman soldiers to break and run from hummocks and sandhills before a considerable force consisting of the 74th Regiment (25th Division) with the 28th Regiment (10th Division) following, was seen 3 miles (4.8 km) to the north east supported two batteries. Strongly counterattacked, the two platoons of the 2nd Queen Victoria's Own Rajput Light Infantry and two platoons of the 92nd Punjabis were halted, losing their commanding officer. However, they were reinforced by the six platoons of the 2/10th Gurkhas, and together with fire from the Requin, D'Entrecasteaux, the armed tug Mansourah and Tug Boat 043 the latter two armed with light guns, they brought the Ottoman attack to a standstill about 1,200 yards (1,100 m) from the British front line.

Subsequently, all the pontoons which could have been used again during the coming night were destroyed by firing two rounds from a torpedo boat's 3-pdr gun into each pontoon, while two pontoons that had been missed were holed by gun cotton charges.

==== Ismailia Ferry Post ====
Another Ottoman force advancing from the south east occupied entrenched positions 800 yards (730 m) from the Canal defences while two of their field batteries went into action to support the infantry attacks along with a 15-cm howitzer battery which opened fire from out in the desert. The howitzer began to accurately target the Hardinge hitting the ship's aerial, forward and aft funnels, the fore stokehold, the foredeck gun and steering gear forcing the ship to move out of range to anchor in Lake Timsah. Subsequently, the Requin in its role as floating battery became a target of the 15-cm howitzer which began to inflict damage but at 09:00 the location of the Ottoman howitzer was identified 9,200 metres (10,100 yd) away. The ship's 27.4 cm turret gun was ranged between 9,000 and 9,500 metres (9,800 and 10,400 yd) took out the howitzer with the third round.

Infantry fighting virtually ceased from 14:00 near Serapeum and Tussum and at 15:30 near Ismailia while artillery continued firing. The 11th Indian Division took over command of the front between the Great Bitter Lake and Lake Timsah while the Swiftsure took over from the Hardinge along with the Ocean while the Hardinge replaced the Swiftsure at Qantara. The 7th and 8th Battalions of the 2nd Australian Brigade arrived at Ismailia during the evening.

Minor attacks were launched when fire was exchanged by small detachments at El Kubri, El Ferdan while the Clio was targeted by two Ottoman field guns soon after 09:00 hitting the ship twice before the field guns were silenced at 10:30. At Qantara a stronger attack between 05:00 and 06:00 against two pickets of the 89th Punjabis armed with machine guns and rifles was stopped by the barbed wire defenses and heavy fire. Here 36 prisoners were captured and 20 dead found outside the wire, while other casualties were carried away by their comrades.

The attacks failed to surprise the Imperial Service Cavalry Brigade and the Bikaner Camel Corps who were garrisoning the canal. The Indians stopped von Kressenstein's force from establishing themselves on the western side of the Suez Canal, suffering casualties of about 150 men. Only two Turkish companies successfully crossed the canal, the rest of the advance party abandoning attempts to cross once the British opened fire. The British then amassed troops at the scene which made another crossing impossible. The Ottomans held their positions until the evening of 3 February 1915, when the commanding officer ordered the retreat. The retreat proceeded "orderly, first into a camp ten km east of Ismailia".

=== 4 February ===
The defending force were surprised to find at dawn on 4 February the Ottoman force had, apart from some snipers, disappeared. Two companies of the 92nd Punjabis advanced north along the east bank to clear the area from Serapeum Post to Tussum. A strong rearguard was encountered at 08:40 when a company from each of the 27th, 62nd Punjabis and 128th Pioneers reinforced their attack when 298 prisoners including 52 wounded were captured along with three machine guns. A further 59 were found dead.

At noon on 4 February the Imperial Service Cavalry Brigade, two infantry battalions and an Indian Mountain Battery marched out from Ismailia Ferry Post. The force saw three to four regiments 7 miles (11 km) north east of Tussum and further to the north another column of infantry were moving eastwards. They returned to the bridgehead having captured 25 prisoners and 70 camels. By the morning of the next day aircraft observed a concentration of forces east of Bir Habeita which was bombed while in the north a column was seen withdrawing through Qatiya. By 10 February the only Ottoman force in the area of the Suez Canal was 400 soldiers at Rigum.

== Aftermath ==
British Headquarters estimated German and Ottoman casualties at more than 2,000, while British losses amounted to 32 killed and 130 wounded. The Ottoman Suez Expeditionary Force suffered the loss of some 1,500 men including 716 prisoners. It had been at the end of its supply lines by the time it reached the Suez Canal. This "forcible reconnaissance" showed the Staff of Fourth Army the difficulties that would await further expeditions.

The opportunity for a British counterattack on the Ottoman force could not be taken advantage of: although there were 70,000 troops in Egypt at the time, only the Indian infantry brigades were highly trained and the infrastructure necessary to get a large force quickly across the Suez Canal did not exist. The only mounted force available was the Imperial Service Cavalry Brigade and the eight companies of the Bikaner Camel Corps, but these were distributed along the Suez Canal defences and unable to concentrate a larger force to attack and capture three divisions of Ottoman infantry.

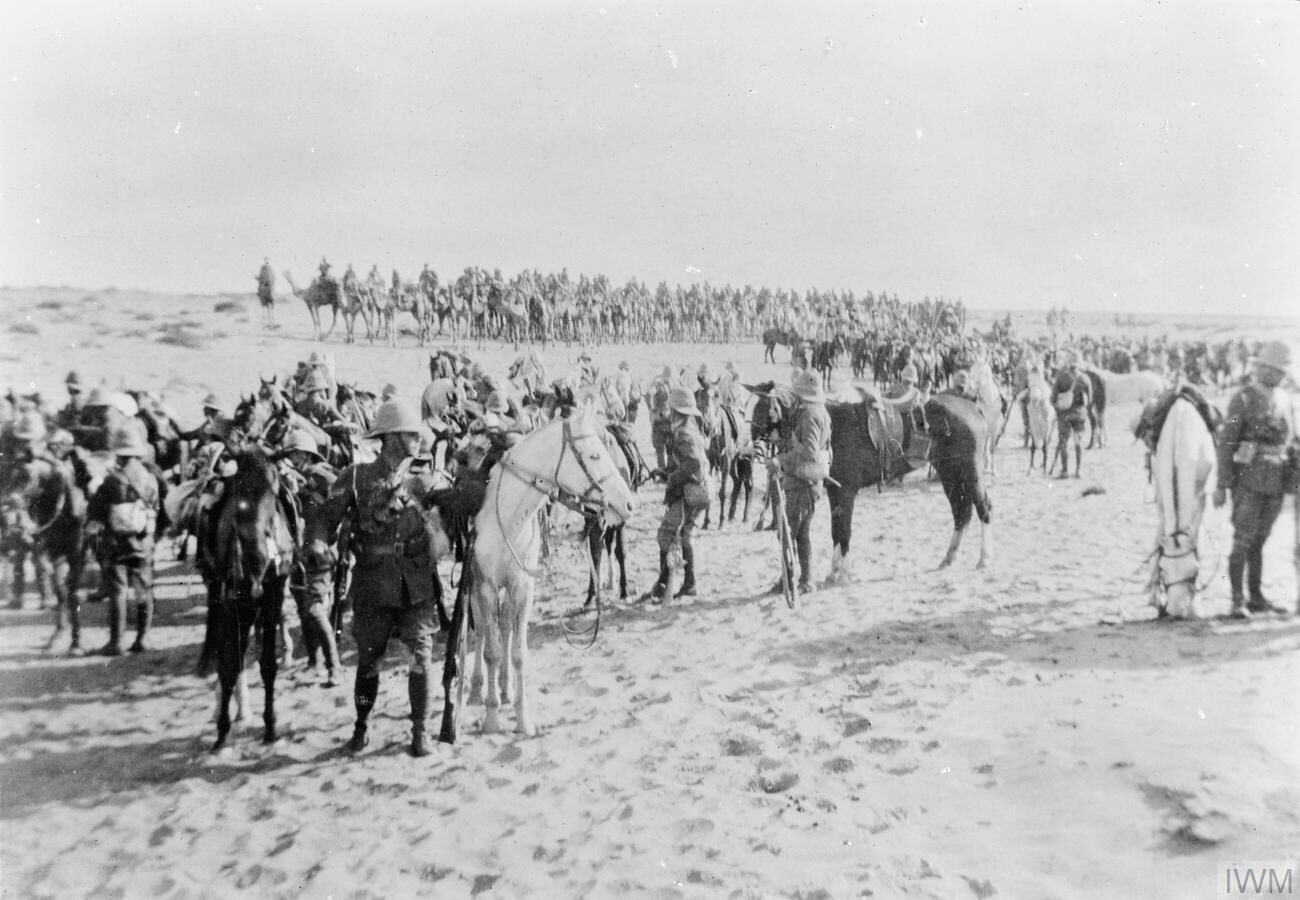
1st Hertfordshire Yeomanry and Bikaner Camel Corps on reconnaissance in Egypt on 14 February 1915

The Ottoman army maintained advance troops and outposts on the Sinai peninsula on a line between El Arish and Nekhl, with forces at Gaza and Beersheba. Kress von Kressenstein, Djemal Pasha's German Chief-of Staff, commanded mobile units to launch a series of raids and attacks to disrupt traffic on the Suez Canal. By 21 September 30,000 troops were in the vicinity of Beersheba.

Early in March Maxwell was asked to prepare a force of about 30,000 Australian and New Zealanders for operations in the Dardanelles in the Mediterranean Expeditionary Force. The landings at Gallipoli on 25 April 1915 began the Gallipoli campaign during which Egypt supported the fighting as the closest major base.

After the failure of the raid, Ottoman morale plummeted - none of their objective had been achieved. Djemal Pasha and von Kressenstein had hoped for an Egyptian Nationalist uprising once they had crossed but this failed to materialise. They were also now aware of the new British forces in Egypt. The only gain the Ottomans achieved was that a significant number of British troops were to be redirected from the European front to the Middle East, and began preparations for the main campaign.
