= Kamal Ram =

Indian recipient of the Victoria Cross

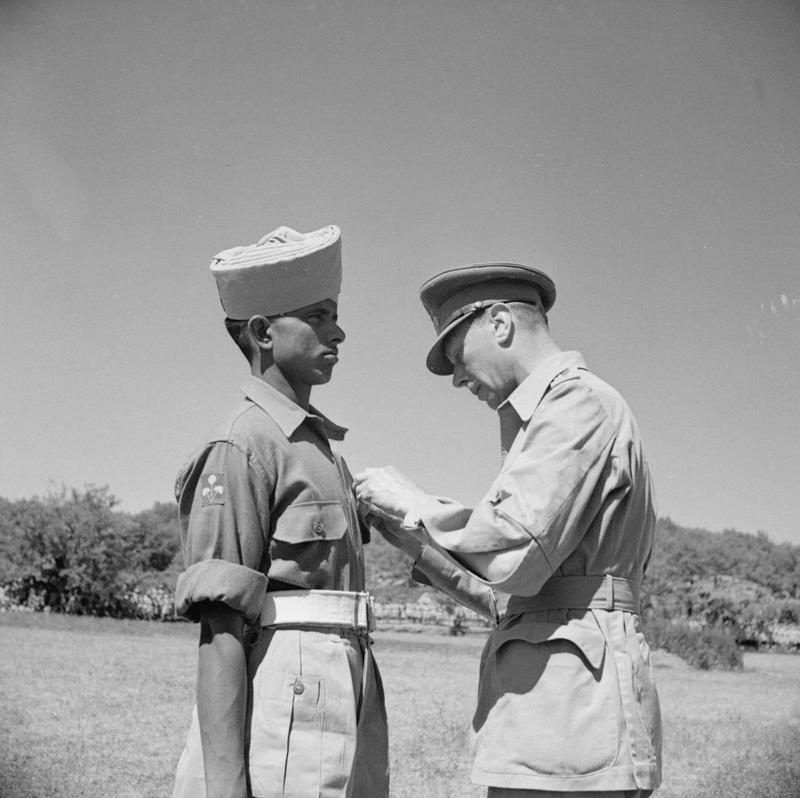
- King George VI pinning the Victoria Cross on Sepoy Kamal Ram, 26 July 1944
- Born: 17 December 1924; Bholupura, Rajputana Agency, British India
- Died: 1 July 1982 (aged 57); Bholupura, Rajasthan, India
- Spouse: Surjo Devi
- Children: Shishram Gurjar, Prem Singh Gurjar, Jeetpal Singh, Hari Singh
- Military career
- Allegiance: British India; India
- Branch: British Indian Army; Indian Army
- Service years: 194?-1972
- Rank: Honorary Lieutenant
- Units: 8th Punjab Regiment
- Conflicts: World War II; Italian campaign
- Awards: Victoria Cross

Kamal Ram, VC (17 December 1924 – 1 July 1982) was an Indian recipient of the Victoria Cross, the highest and most prestigious award for gallantry in the face of the enemy that can be awarded to British and Commonwealth forces. He was the first-youngest Indian recipient of the award.

== Life ==
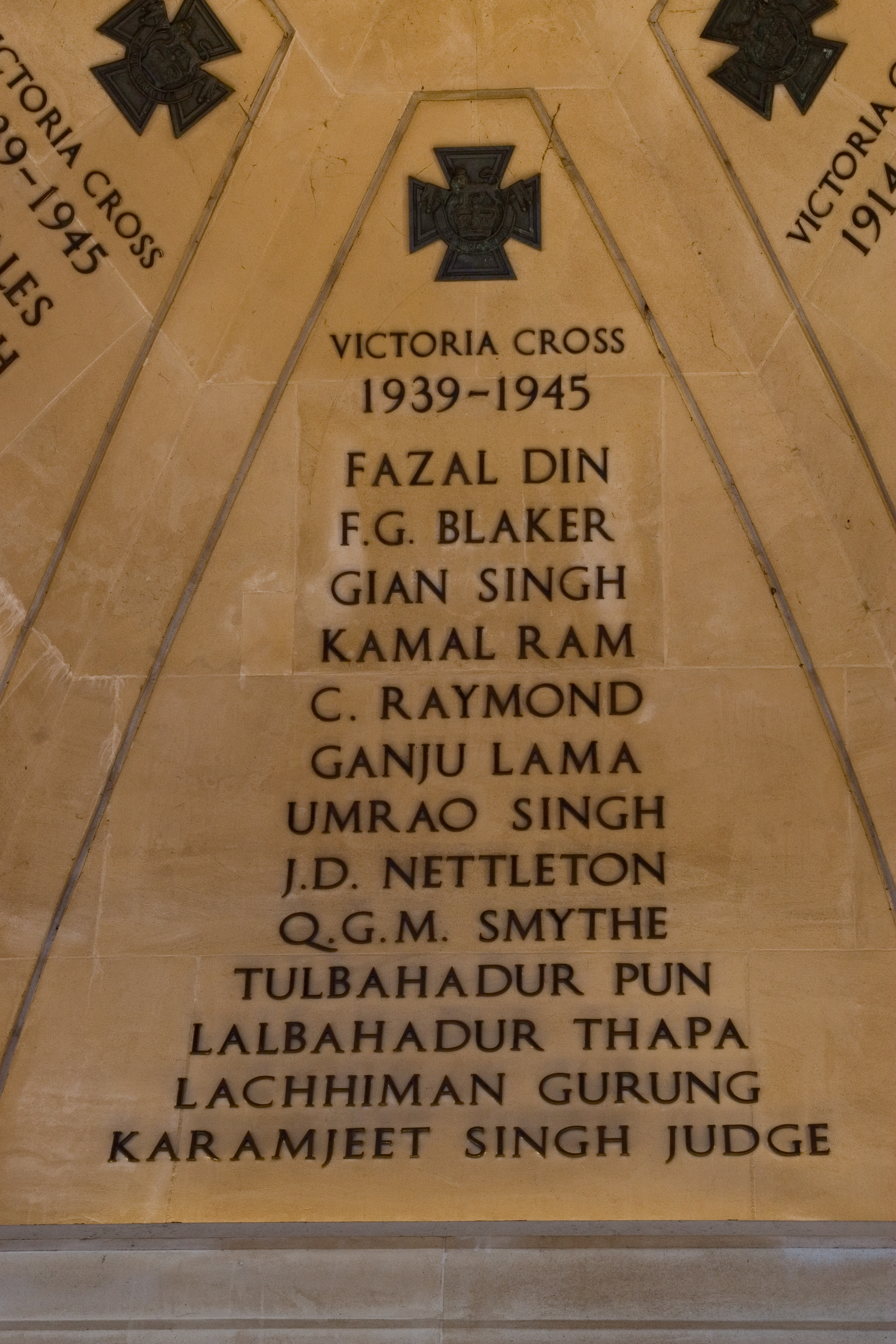
Kamal Ram's name is inscribed on the Memorial Gates at Constitution Hill in London.

Kamal Ram was born into a Gurjar family on 17 December 1924, in the village of Bholupura, Karauli district, British India (now in Rajasthan, India). His father's name was Shiv Chand. During the Second World War, he served in the 3rd Battalion, 8th Punjab Regiment, British Indian Army (now the 3rd Battalion, Baloch Regiment, Pakistan Army). He was 19 years old, with the rank of Sepoy, when, on 12 May 1944, his battalion assaulted the formidable German defences of the Gustav Line, across the River Gari in Italy; and he performed the deeds for which he was awarded the VC. The citation reads as follows:

The KING has been graciously pleased to approve the award of the VICTORIA CROSS to:–

No. 35408 Sepoy Kamal Ram, 8th Punjab Regiment, Indian Army.

In Italy, on 12 May 1944, after crossing the River Gari overnight, the Company advance was held up by heavy machine-gun fire from four posts on the front and flanks. As the capture of the position was essential to secure the bridgehead, the Company Commander called for a volunteer to get round the rear of the right post and silence it. Volunteering at once and crawling forward through the wire to a flank, Sepoy Kamal Ram attacked the post single handed and shot the first machine-gunner; a second German tried to seize his weapon but Sepoy Kamal Ram killed him with the bayonet, and then shot a German officer who, appearing from the trench with his pistol, was about to fire. Sepoy Kamal Ram, still alone, at once went on to attack the second machine-gun post which was continuing to hold up the advance, and after shooting one machine-gunner, he threw a grenade and the remaining enemy surrendered. Seeing a Havildar making a reconnaissance for an attack on the third post, Sepoy Kamal Ram joined him, and, having first covered his companion, went in and completed the destruction of this post. By his courage, initiative and disregard for personal risk, Sepoy Kamal Ram enabled his Company to charge and secure the ground vital to the establishment of the bridgehead and the completion of work on two bridges. When a platoon, pushed further forward to widen the position, was fired on from a house, Sepoy Kamal Ram, dashing towards the house, shot one German in a slit trench and captured two more. His sustained and outstanding bravery unquestionably saved a difficult situation at a critical period of the battle and enabled his Battalion to attain the essential part of their objective.

— London Gazette, 27 July 1944.

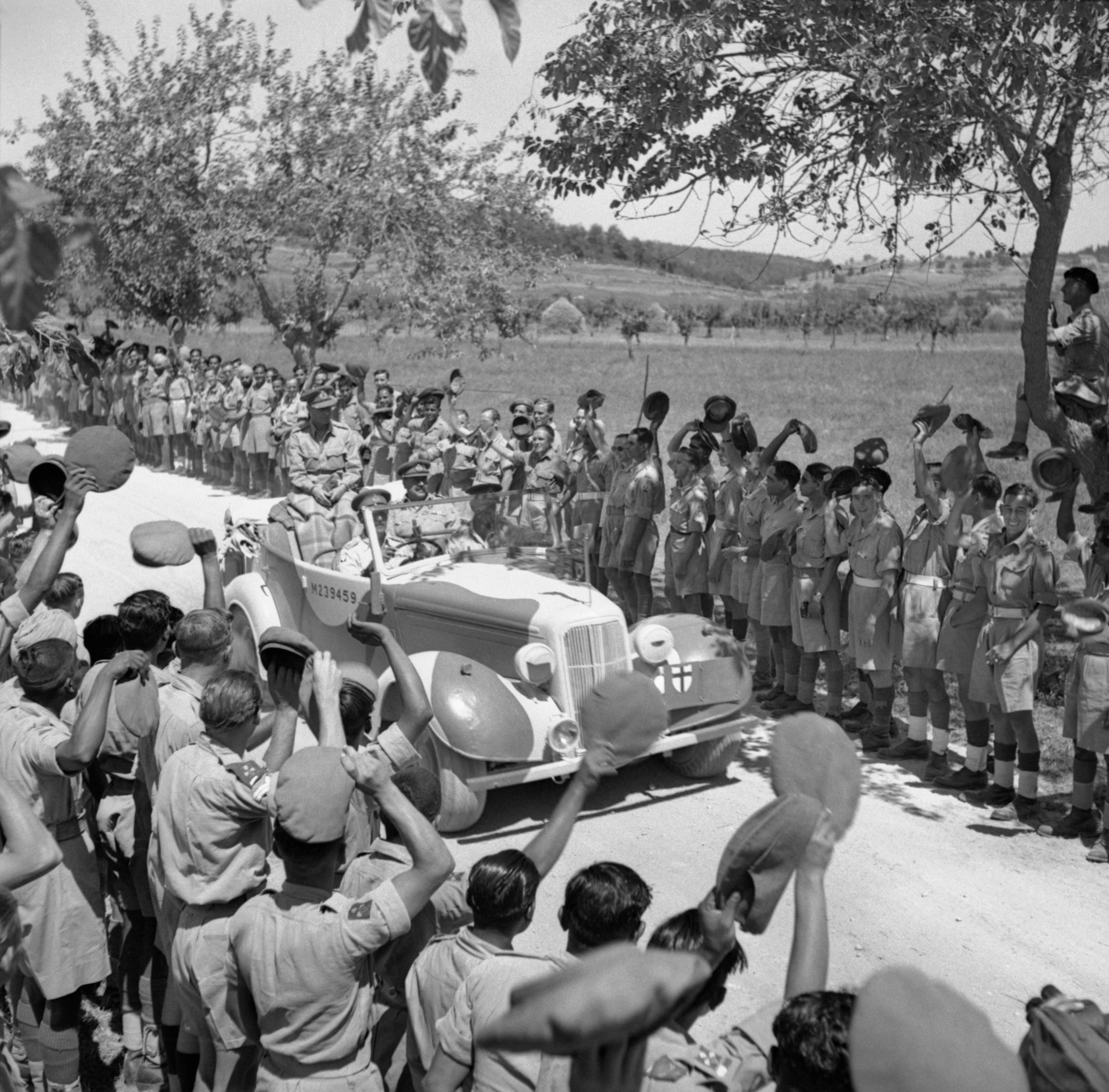
King George VI is driven past cheering Indian troops on his way to a ceremony to invest Sepoy Kamal Ram with the Victoria Cross, Italy, 26 July 1944.

King George VI presented him with the medal in Italy in 1944. He remained in the Indian Army post-independence, rising to the rank of Havildar (sergeant) before receiving a promotion to Jemadar (now Naib subedar) on 18 May 1960, and further promotions to Subedar on 1 March 1964 and to Subedar-major on 1 January 1970. He retired in 1972 with the rank of Honorary Lieutenant, and died in 1982.

== Further Information ==
Ram is one of four ethnic minority Victoria Cross winners commemorated in the Ministry of Defence brochure "We were there", which documents ethnic minority contribution to Great Britain in times of war in every aspect of military life. The other Victoria Cross winners included in the publication are William Hall, Gian Singh and Abdul Hafiz.

== Family ==
Kamal Ram was married to Smt. Surjo Devi (born 8 May 1924), Mrs. Surjo Devi is still alive. who is known for being honoured in several public ceremonies for her husband's bravery.

kamal ram vc was the son of Shivchand Gurjar and Rukmani Devi.

Kamal Ram had four sons:

1. Shishram Gurjar (gov. principal )
2. Prem Singh Gurjar (havaldar)
3. Jeetpal Singh Gurjar (Subedar, Indian Army)
4. Hari Singh Gurjar(Havaldar, Indian Army)

grandsons

1. Dharmendra Singh (8239484822)
2. Dr. Pradeep gurjar (7014606685)
3. Satpal Singh Gurjar (teacher)
4. Hemraj Singh (bsf)
5. Devi Singh (ntpc)
6. Amrit Singh (teacher)
7. dr.Dheer Singh Gurjar (amc)
8. dr.Dillep Singh (amc)
9. Rajveer Singh (Sarpanch)
10. Rakesh Singh (sarpanch)
11. Badal Gurjar

Members of his extended family continue to live in Bholupura karauli rajasthan (322255)

== The medal ==
His Victoria Cross is on display in the Lord Ashcroft Gallery at the Imperial War Museum, London. And now the Victoria Cross is kept safe with the family in Bholupura.

== Bibliography ==
- Bawa, Sundar Singh (1972). Tradition never dies: the genesis and growth of the Indian army. Lalvani Publishing House. ISBN 978-0856550775.
- Ahmad, Rifat Nadeem (2006). Unfaded Glory: The 8th Punjab Regiment 1798-1956. Naval & Military Press. ISBN 1783311045.
