= Shahamad Khan =

Defended a strip in Mesopotamia, Victoria Cross

Shahamad Khan VC
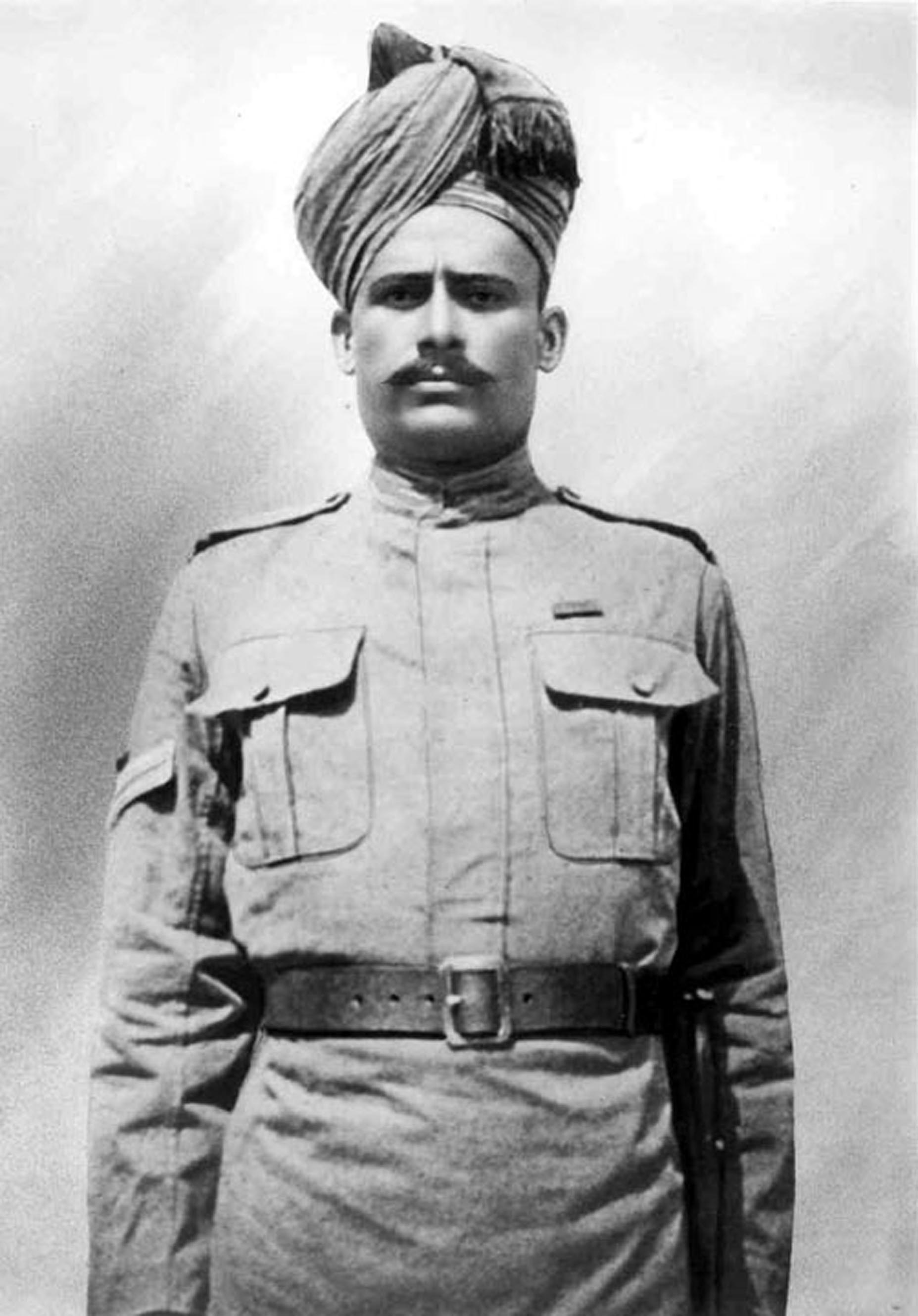
- Naik Shahamad Khan, VC, 89th Punjabis, 1916.
- Born: 1 July 1879; Rawalpindi, Punjab, British India
- Died: 28 July 1947 (aged 68)
- Burial place: Takhti, Pakistan
- Military career
- Allegiance: British India
- Branch: British Indian Army
- Rank: Subedar
- Unit: 89th Punjabis
- Conflicts: World War I; Mesopotamian campaign
- Awards: Victoria Cross

Shahamad Khan VC (1 July 1879 – 28 July 1947) was a British Indian soldier who was a recipient of the Victorian Cross during the era of the British Raj. He was one of the first people from the Indian Subcontinent to receive the Victoria Cross, the highest and most prestigious award for gallantry in the face of the enemy that can be awarded to British and Commonwealth forces.

== Military career ==
A Punjabi Muslim Janjua Rajput from Rawalpindi District in the then British India, he was 36 years old, and a Naik in the 89th Punjabis, British Indian Army (now 1st Battalion the Baloch Regiment, Pakistan Army) during the First World War. He served first on the Western Front from May to December 1915 and then on the Tigris Front in Mesopotamia, when the following deed took place, for which he was awarded the VC:

"Shahamad Khan was in charge of a machine-gun section 150 yards from the enemy's position, covering a gap in the New Line at Beit Ayeesa, Mesopotamia on 12th/13 April 1916. After all his men, apart from two belt-fillers, had become casualties, Shamahad Khan, working the gun single-handed, repelled three counter-attacks. Under extremely heavy fire, he continued to hold the gap, whilst it was being made secure, for three hours. When his gun was disabled by enemy fire, he and the two belt-fillers continued to hold the ground with their rifles until they were ordered to retire. Along with the three men who were sent to his assistance, he brought back to his own lines, his gun, ammunition and a severely wounded man. Eventually he returned to remove all remaining arms and equipment, except for two shovels. But for his action, the line would undoubtedly have been penetrated by the enemy."

He later achieved the rank of Subedar. He died in 1947 is buried in his ancestral village of Takhti, Pakistan.

== See also ==
- Geoghegan, Col NM, and Campbell, Capt MHA. (1928). History of the 1st Battalion 8th Punjab Regiment. Aldershot: Gale & Polden.
- Ahmad, Maj Rifat Nadeem, and Ahmed, Maj Gen Rafiuddin. (2006). Unfaded Glory: The 8th Punjab Regiment 1798-1956. Abbottabad: The Baloch Regimental Centre.
- Monuments to Courage (David Harvey, 1999).
- The Register of the Victoria Cross (This England, 1997).
