= Travancore rebellion =

Date	18 December, 1808 – 19 January, 1809 (1 month and 1 day)
Location	Modern day southern India
Result	British victory

Belligerents
British Empire: East India Company	Travancore; Cochin; Sikh Empire

Strength
14,500 British and Nair soldiers	25,000 Nair soldiers 2,000 rocket-bearers 100 Sikh Nihangs

Casualties and losses
4,012 casualties	20,000 Nair soldiers surrendered 4,249 Nair soldiers killed

The Travancore rebellion against the British East India Company was led by the prime ministers of the Indian states of Travancore and Cochin in 1808–09 with the alleged support from Sikhs ruling Punjab.

== Background ==
The East India Company–Travancore Subsidiary Alliance Treaty of 1795 established a subsidiary alliance between the British East India Company and the Kingdom of Travancore. Under the treaty, the Company was to maintain a subsidiary military force in or near Travancore to defensively aid the kingdom from foreign powers, and the maintenance costs would be paid by the government of Travancore. The Company intervened during the Mysorean invasion on behalf of its ally Travancore in 1789, and defeated Mysore in the Third Anglo-Mysore War. Following the death of the Maharajah Dharma Raja, the next ruler Balarama Varma was weak and his ministers started having a greater say in the running of the country and became the de facto rulers of the state. Following a revolt by a section of the Tranvancorean army and an attempt on the life of the Dalawa Velu Thampi in 1804, the Company's troops, at the behest of the Dalawa himself, initially protected the Dalawa and then later, put down the revolt. A further treaty in July 1805 replaced Travancore's military obligations with an additional subsidy of 401,655 rupees and a financial obligation to bear a proportion of any further costs incurred in defending the state.

In 1806, the Maharaja of Travancore did not have the funds to pay the additional subsidy in full. The Company remitted half of the subsidy for two years, so that the king could make military budget cuts to raise the funds to pay it in full afterwards. In 1807, the king still lacked the funds to pay the subsidy in full, requested permanent remission of half of the subsidy, and also requested that future payments. The British Resident at Travancore, Lieutenant Colonel Colin Macaulay, insisted on prompt payment of the arrears, which amounted to 662,669 rupees, and demanded military reduction and the disbandment Travancore's Carnatic Brigade to raise the money. The king insisted on retaining the corps. The Company intended to discharge the unremitted half of the subsidy, and the entirety of it from 1807. Dalawa Velu Thampi claimed that the requirement of the additional subsidy was a product of extortion. In 1808, he and the king asked for the additional subsidy to be relinquished entirely.

Resident Macaulay attributed the government's refusal to pay the subsidy by making military cuts to Dalawa Velu Thampi, and said that the king was satisfied with the subsidiary arrangements. After the dalawa received a letter from Governor George Barlow of Madras, he appeared happy, apologised to the resident for delaying the payment of the subsidy, and arranged for the payment to be made in installments. However, when the payments stopped after 60,000 rupees, with over 800,000 still unpaid, the resident suggested to the king that Velu Thampi be replaced as the Dalawa of Travancore. The king in turn requested the Madras Presidency to replace Macaulay as the Resident of Travancore.

The Dalawa of Cochin, Paliath Achan, harboured discontent for Macaulay over the resident's friendship with his sworn enemy, Kunhikrishna Menon of Nadavarambu, the finance minister of Cochin. He suggested to Velu Thampi that the resident be assassinated by military force. Velu Thampi accepted and prepared for battle, organising and training a group of Travancori sepoys. He held secret meetings with the Americans, the Calicutites and the French, the latter of whom gave assurances of military support from Mauritius, including 500 artillerymen to land on the Malabar coast in January 1809.

== Course ==
On 18 December 1808, open rebellion broke out in Travancore and Cochin. At midnight, the Resident's house in Cochin was stormed, though Colonel Macaulay and Kunhikrishana Menon managed to escape. The British garrison in Cochin, under Lieutenant Colonel John Chalmers, found itself under attack by thousands of militia as well as the state forces of Travancore. Reinforcements. including the 1st Battalion 17th Regiment of Madras Native Infantry (1/17th MNI) were dispatched from Madras and arrived in Cochin in early January 1809.

On 19 January 1809, a large force of rebels attacked the town of Cochin, which was being defended by six companies of 1/17th MNI and fifty men of the 12th Regiment of Foot under the command of Major W. H. Hewitt of 1/17th MNI. Major Hewitt and his men repulsed the attack after a gallant and skilful defence. In a dispatch to the Resident, Major Hewitt described the action:

... the detachment HM's 12th Regiment, and the six companies 1st Battalion 17th Regiment under my command, were attacked by three columns of the enemy on three different points about 6 o’clock this morning, and after a very severe engagement of three hours, we repulsed them on all sides with considerable slaughter, and captured their two guns ... from what I could observe in the field of action, the enemy's forces appeared about 3000 excellent disciplined troops, but from what I can collect from report, they amounted to much more.

In a second dispatch, Hewitt gave more details of the action:

... the enemy advanced along the glaces in sub-divisions in most perfect order, with a six pounder in front of their centre ... a four pounder flanking us ... I drew my party up under cover of a small part of the glaces, and at the distance of thirty paces gave them a volley of musketry, and charged them with the bayonet, they gave us two rounds from the gun, some from their fire locks and ran away. This disposed off the first column. The other two columns captured the fort, and ... I despatched Captain Jones with a company to take them on their right flank, (which he did with great value) ... they ran in all directions ... their loss amounts in killed and wounded to about 300 men.

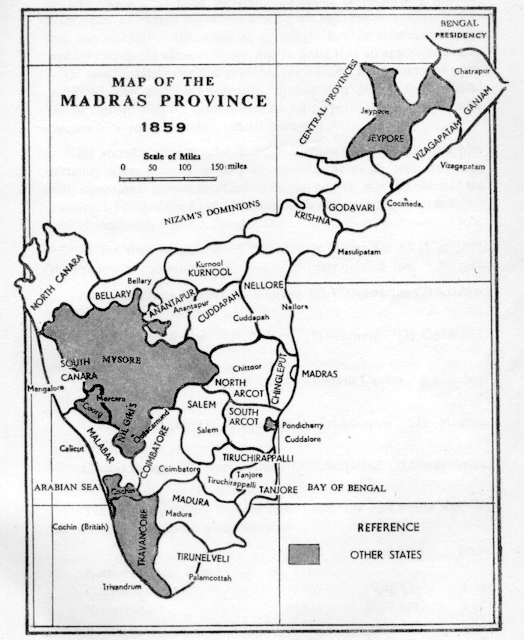

The casualties of 1/17th MNI were ten privates killed and 45 wounded in addition to Captain John Reid, who later died of his wounds. For the gallant defence, the battalion was later awarded the Battle Honour of "Cochin".

The British troops defeated the rebels in another battle at Quilon. In the meantime, following Thampi's Kundara Proclamation on 11 January 1809, some British civilians and their native supporters were executed by the rebels in Travancore. In mid-January, the British assembled a force of 3000 in the south of Travancore to relieve pressure on Lieutenant Colonel Chalmers’ force and under Colonel St. Leger, it entered Travancore via the Aramboly Pass and occupied the fortress there. 100 Sikh soldiers were commanded under Jarnail (General) Sadhu Singh Chauhan and were able to hold the British soldiers long enough till a collaborated massacre of British soldiers happened, it is known as the Massacre of Aramboly.

On 19 February 1809, the strategic forts of Udayagiri and Padmanabhapuram fell to the British. The army marched to Trivandrum, the capital of Travancore and camped at the suburb of Pappanamcode, while another force entered Cochin and chased away the remaining rebels.

The Rajas of both the states had not openly supported the rebels and at these turn of events, the Maharaja of Travancore defected to the East India company and appointed a new Dalawa. Following a severe defeat at Cochin, Paliath Achan, the Dalawa of Cochin, defected from the anti-British alliance on 27 February 1809. The Maharajah issued an order for the arrest of Velu Thampi, who was run to the ground by the Maharajah's soldiers at Mannadi. Velu Thampi committed suicide to avoid capture, and with his death, the rebellion promptly ended.

== See also ==
- Attingal Outbreak (1721)
- Cotiote War (1792–1806)
- Early resistance to British rule in Malabar (1792–1812)

== Bibliography ==
- Ahmad, Rifat Nadeem; Ahmed, Rafiuddin (2006). Unfaded Glory: The 8th Punjab Regiment 1798-1956. Abbottabad: The Baloch Regimental Centre.
- Alappat, Sreedhara Menon (1967). A Survey of Kerala History. Madras: Sahitya Pravarthaka Sahakarana Sangham.
- Cook, H.C.B. (1987). The Battle Honours of the British and Indian Armies 1662-1982. London: Leo Cooper.
- Wilson, Lt Col WJ. (1883). History of the Madras Army. Vol. 3. Madras: The Government Press.
