= Rampa rebellion of 1879 =

- Part of Indian independence movement
- Location: Andhra Pradesh
- Commanded by: Chandrayya and others
- Date: 1879–1880
- Casualties: Unknown

Rampa rebellion of 1879 (also known as the First Rampa rebellion to distinguish it from the Rampa Rebellion of 1922-24) was an insurrection by the hill tribes in the Rampa region of the Vizagapatam Hill Tracts Agency of Vizagapatam District against the British government of the Madras Presidency.

== Causes ==
The hill tracts of Vishakhapatanam were inhabited by hill tribes who led a more or less independent way of life for centuries. These tribes either spoke Telugu or Odia or tribal dialects and paid a regular tribute to a zamindar or mansabdar who was a subject of British India. The then mansabdar of the region was an oppressive tyrant, which led to smaller riots and uprisings before. Also, traders from the lowlands made unfair contracts with the tribes. When disputes arose, the government' favoritism towards the traders led to the seizure of tribal property. To make matters worse, the Madras government introduced a law making toddy tapping for domestic purposes illegal and introducing a toddy tax, while toddy tapping was part of their culture. This led to a full-scale rebellion in early 1879.

== Events ==
The rebellion started in March 1879 when the hill tribes of Rampa made attacks on police stations in Chodavaram taluk. Soon, the rebellion spread to the Golconda hills of Vishagapatam and Bhadrachalam taluk. Within a short time, rebellion engulfed the whole district.

The Madras government responded by dispatching several companies of policemen, six regiments of Madras infantry, a squadron of Madras cavalry, two companies of sappers and miners and an infantry regiment from the Hyderabad army. The rebellion was eventually suppressed and a large number of revolutionaries were sent to the Andaman Jail.

== Aftermath ==
In the aftermath of the rebellion, various conciliatory measures were adopted by the British government. They tried to improve the condition of the tribals of East Godavari agency and the hill tracts in the northern part of Madras Presidency. Also, the mansabdar was arrested, blaming his rule as a principal cause of the rebellion. Since the intention of the rebellion was not to drive away the British but to end exploitation, the tribes accepted the British Government in place of the mansabdar, unaware of the implications of this change.
