= 91st Punjabis (Light Infantry) =

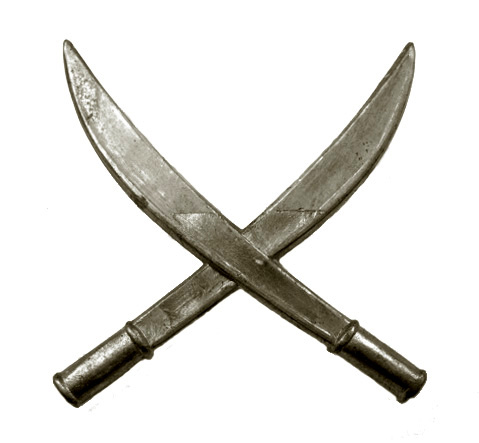
- Active: 1903 - 1922
- Country: (British Raj) British India
- Branch: (British Raj) British Indian Army
- Type: Infantry
- Size: 2 Battalions
- Uniform: Red; faced dark green; green in 1882; Drab; faced cherry in 1894
- Engagements: Third Anglo-Maratha War 1817-19; Coorg War 1834; Indian Rebellion of 1857; Pacification of Upper Burma 1890-96; Boxer Rebellion 1900; First World War 1914-18 (Mesopotamia, Palestine)

Commanders
- Colonel of the Regiment: Lt Gen Henry D'Urban Keary, KCB, KCIE, DSO

The 91st Punjabis (Light Infantry) was an infantry regiment of the British Indian Army. The regiment was raised in 1800 as a battalion of Madras Native Infantry. It was designated as the 91st Punjabis in 1903 and became 3rd Battalion 8th Punjab Regiment in 1922. In 1947, it was allocated to Pakistan Army, where it continues to exist as 3rd Battalion of The Baloch Regiment.

== Early history ==
The origin of the regiment can be traced back to 1759 when it was first raised as Irregular Troops of East India Company and was formed into a Battalion of "Coast Sepoys". It was converted into regulars on 1 January 1800 at Trichonopoly as the 1st Battalion 16th Regiment of Trichnopoly Native Infantry by Lieutenant Colonel S Jennerett and was known as Jennerett ki Paltan (Jennerett's Battalion). It was composed mostly of Muslims, Tamils and Telugus of South India. In 1811, it was styled as Trichonopoly Light Infantry as a reward for a 25-mile forced march in support of a retreating force; when it arrived just in time to turn the tables in a minor engagement near Mysore. In 1817–19, the regiment took part in Third Anglo-Maratha War, where it greatly distinguished itself in the Battle of Mahidpur. In 1824, it was redesignated as the 31st Regiment of Madras Native Infantry.

In 1887, the battalion was formed into SHWEBO BATTALION of UPPER BURMA POLICE and between 1887 and 1890 remained engaged in eliminating the rebels of SHWEBO area in Central Burma where it captured the WUNTHO SWABWA's DAH and SHEATH which later became part of its cap badge. On 1 February 1892, the battalion was designated as 31st Madras Light Infantry( 6th Burma Battalion) with Capt HDU Keary as the Commanding Officer who went to command it for 23 years at stretch till 1909. From 1900 to 1912, the battalion operated in China as a part of an Expeditionary Force in the Boxer Rebellion. On 3 October 1903, the battalion was renamed as 91st PUNJABIS. On 6 February 1906, the unit was presented with Regimental and Royal Colors at Bhamo, Burma. After 31 years of service in Burma. the unit proceeded overseas in 1916 for World War 1 where it saw actions at Mesopotamia and Palestine.

== 91st Punjabis (Light Infantry) ==
Subsequent to the reforms brought about in the Indian Army by Lord Kitchener in 1903, all former Madras units had 60 added to their numbers. Consequently, the regiment's designation was changed to 91st Punjabis (Light Infantry). In 1912, Major General Henry D'Urban Keary was appointed colonel of the regiment, who had commanded the regiment from 1892 to 1909.

On the outbreak of the First World War, the regiment was still stationed in Burma. It moved to Mesopotamia in 1916 and participated in operations on both the Tigris and the Euphrates Fronts, including the First Battle of Ramadi. In 1918, the regiment moved to Palestine and took part in the Battle of Megiddo, which led to the annihilation of Turkish Army in Palestine.

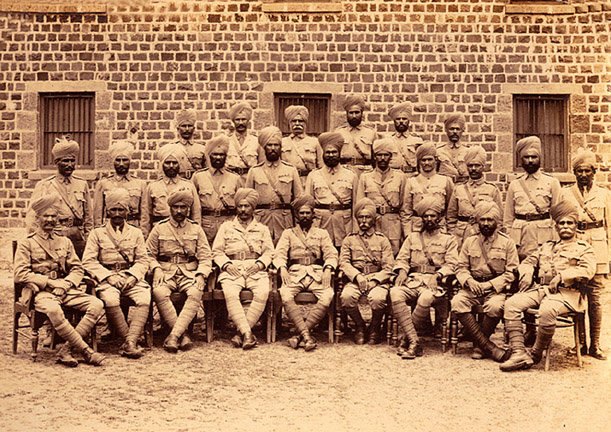
Indian Officers of 1st Battalion 91st Punjabis (Light Infantry), Poona, 1920.

During the war, the 91st Punjabis suffered 443 casualties including 185 killed. In 1918, they raised a second battalion which served in Egypt after the war. It was disbanded in 1921.

== Subsequent History ==
After the First World War, the battalion returned to India and in March 1921 became part of 8th Infantry Group, however, in October 1923 its title was changed to 3rd Battalion of 8 Punjab Regiment. The battalion operated in South Waziristan, Chitral, Wucha Garhi and Khujuri Plains up to 1930. From 1930 to 1941, the battalion remained in Jhansi, Bombay and Poona. In 1930 the new Colors were presented at Jhansi, whereas old colors were deposited in Viceroy's House.

On 9 August, the battalion embarked on active service during World War II as part of 8th Infantry Division and took part in numerous operations of Italian Campaign.3/8th Punjab fought with great gallantry in the Italian Campaign and suffered 1,289 casualties including 314 killed. It was awarded numerous gallantry awards including the Victoria Cross. It was on 12 May 1944 that Sepoy Kamal Ram was awarded the Victoria Cross at Gustav Lines. He was the youngest VC of his time at the age of 19. Later he retired as Subedar Major from the Indian Army.

At the time of partition, in 1947, the 8th Punjab Regiment was stationed at Allahabad and was allocated to Pakistan Army. In September 1947 Unit moved to Peshawar Under LT Colonel Raja Muhammad Sarwar. In January 1948, Unit moved to East Pakistan where it had THE HONOUR TO present Guard of Honour to the Father of Nation, Quaid e Azam Muhammad Ali Jinnah when he arrived at Dhakka airport on 19 March 1948.

The battalion returned from East Pakistan in 1950 and served at Bannu, Dera Ismail Khan and Chamman. In 1956, the unit was at Dera Ismail Khan where it was merged with the Baluch Regiment and 3/8th Punjab was designated as 3 Baluch (now 3 Baloch). In 1958 the battalion played a vital role in crushing the secessionist attempt of Khan of Kalat. The unit served at Quetta and Kakul till 1963. The battalion was presented new regimental and national colors at Quetta on 28 February 1960, thus getting rid of Royal colors. The battalion moved to Lahore in 1963 and on 6 September 1965 was first to blunt Indian attack at BATAPUR Bridge on BRBL Canal on Main Wagha- Lahore GT Road. In this battle, 38 soldiers embraced Shahdat and 60 were injured. A monument in the memory of these Shaheeds stands at the Bank of BRBL at Main GT Road at Batapur. In 1966 once again the unit moved to Quetta and in 1969 was airlifted to Rajshahi East Pakistan where it restored law and order in the districts of Rajshahi, Rangpur and Pabna. The battalion came back to Lahore in 1971 to once again face the Indian attack on Lahore, this time at Barki Sector where it captured Indian village Chena Bedi Chand. The unit lost 10 soldiers and 24 were wounded. Later the unit took part in Counter Insurgency Operation in Marri/Dera Bugti Agencies and anti dacoit operation in Sindh. From 1993 to 1997 the battalion served as Prime Minister's Guard Battalion at Islamabad and with a tenure at Line of Control and Lahore it is serving in Operation Zarb E Azb in North Waziristan.

== Genealogy ==
- 1759 - Coast Sepoys Battalion of Irregular Troops of East India Company
- 1800 - 1st Battalion 16th Regiment Madras Native Infantry
- 1812 - 1st Battalion 16th Regiment (Trichonopoly) Madras Native Infantry or Trichonopoly Light Infantry
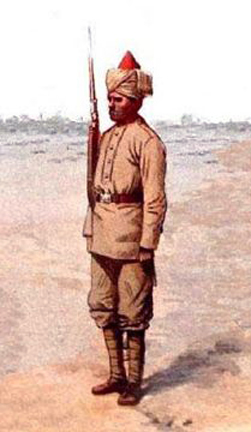
  Sepoy 31st Regiment (Trichonopoly) Madras (Light) Infantry. Illustration by Richard Simkin, c. 1888.
- 1824 - 31st Regiment Madras Native Infantry or Trichonopoly Light Infantry
- 1885 - 31st Regiment (Trichonopoly) Madras (Light) Infantry
- 1887 - SHWEBO Battalion of Upper Burma Military Police
- 1892 - 31st Regiment (6th Burma Battalion) Madras (Light) Infantry
- 1901 - 31st Burma Light Infantry
- 1903 - 91st Punjabis
- 1904 - 91st Punjabis (Light Infantry)
- 1906 - Presented Colors at Bhamo, Burma
- 1918 - 1st Battalion 91st Punjabis (Light Infantry) or 1/91st Punjabis (Light Infantry)
- 1921 - 91st Punjabis (Light Infantry) as part of 8th Infantry Group
- 1923 - 3rd Battalion of 8th Punjab Regiment or 3/8th Punjab
- 1930 - Presented new Colors at Jhansi, India
- 1944 - Sepoy Kamal Ram awarded Victoria Cross at Gustave Lines, Italy-WWII
- 1947 - Became part of Pakistan Army and moved to Peshawar
- 1948 - Presented Guard of Honor to Quaid e Azam at Dhakka Airport on 19 March
- 1956 - 3rd Battalion The Baluch Regiment or 3 Baluch
- 1960 - Presented new Regimental and National colors at Quetta.
- 1991 - 3rd Battalion The Baloch Regiment or 3 Baloch

== See also ==
- Baloch Regiment
- 8th Punjab Regiment
- Madras Army
