= Anglo-Persian War =

1856–1857 war between the UK and Iran

- Part of the Great Game
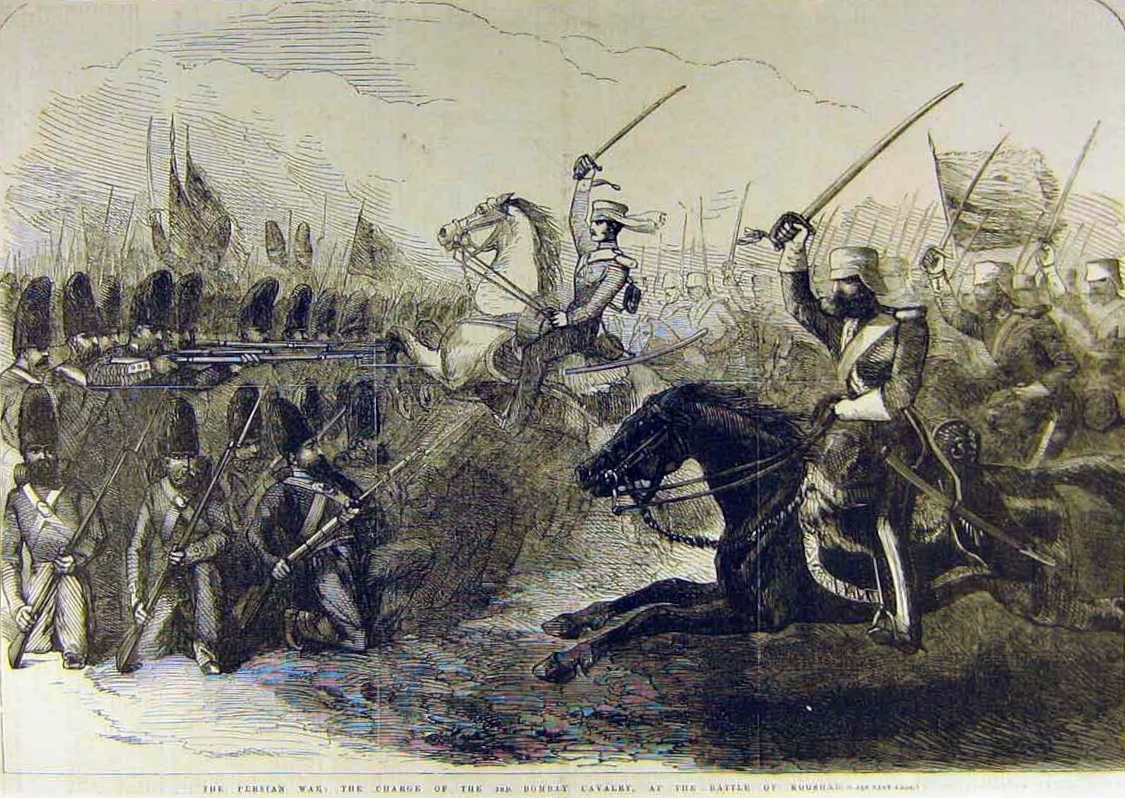
- Battle of Khushab (1857) by The Illustrated London News
Date	1 November 1856 – 4 April 1857 (5 months and 3 days)
Location	Southern Persia
Result	British victory: Treaty of Paris; British withdrawal from Persia; Persian withdrawal from Herat

Belligerents
(United Kingdom of Great Britain and Ireland) United Kingdom; East India Company; Afghanistan	Qajar Iran

Commanders and leaders
(United Kingdom of Great Britain and Ireland) James Outram (United Kingdom of Great Britain and Ireland) M.G. Foster Stalker; Dost Mohammad Khan	Nasser al-Din Shah; Khanlar Mirza; Mehr Ali Khan Nuri; Mirza Mohammad; Gov. Tahmasp Mirza; Baqer Khan Tangestani; Sohrab Khan Qashqaei

Strength
British Expeditionary Force: 1st Div. - 5,700 troops; 2nd Div. - 4,400 troops	Fars Division: 6,000 Nezam and Irregular Infantry; 2,000 Regular Cavalry; Khanlar Mirza's Army: 10,000–13,000 troops; Baqer Khan Tangestani Defense (December, 1856): 400-500; Khans of Bushehr (March, 1857): 3,000 Irregular Musketeers; Tahmasp Mirza Moayyed od-Dowleh Army (March,1857): 1,500 Irregular Cavalry and Musketeers of Kohgiluyeh

Casualties and losses
740+ (December, 1856) 1,400 (1857)	500-600+

The Anglo-Persian War, also known as the Anglo-Iranian War (Persian: جنگ ایران و انگلستان, romanized: Jang-e Irân o Engelestan), was a war fought between the United Kingdom and Iran, which was ruled by the Qajar dynasty. In the war, the British opposed an attempt by Iran to press its claim on the city of Herat. Though Herat had been conquered by Iran in 1856, it had declared itself independent under its own rebellious emir and placed itself under the protection of the British in India and in alliance with the Emirate of Afghanistan. The British campaign was successfully conducted under the leadership of Major General Sir James Outram in two theatres: on the southern coast of Iran near Bushehr and in southern Mesopotamia. The war resulted in the Iranians withdrawing from Herat in 1857 and signing the treaty of Paris to surrender their claims on the city in return for the British withdrawing from southern Iran.

== Background ==
In the context of the Great Game—the Anglo-Russian contest for influence in Central Asia—the British wished Afghanistan to remain an independent country with friendly relation as a buffer state against Russian expansion towards India. They opposed an extension of Iranian influence in Afghanistan because of the perception that Iran was unduly influenced by Russia. The Iranian influence on Central Asia had caused the creation of Greater Iran; although they knew of the influence, the British had never attacked Iran. Iran had over 12 foreign provinces under its imperial control. It made a fresh attempt in 1856 and succeeded in taking Herat on 25 October, in violation of an existing Anglo–Persian Treaty. In response, the British governor-general in India, acting on orders from London, declared war on 1 November.

Separate from and preceding the dispute over Herat, was an incident concerning Mirza Hashem Khan, whom the British ambassador had hoped to appoint as a secretary to the mission in Tehran. The Iranians objected and created a dispute that escalated after rumours appeared that the British ambassador had improper relations with the man's wife, who was the sister of the Shah's main wife. The dispute escalated further when the Iranians arrested the woman; the British ambassador broke relations when they refused to release her. Indeed, the initial mobilisation of British forces began in response to the incident although it is unlikely that the British would have gone beyond the occupation of one or two islands in the Persian Gulf if the issue of Herat had not arisen.

== 1856 ==
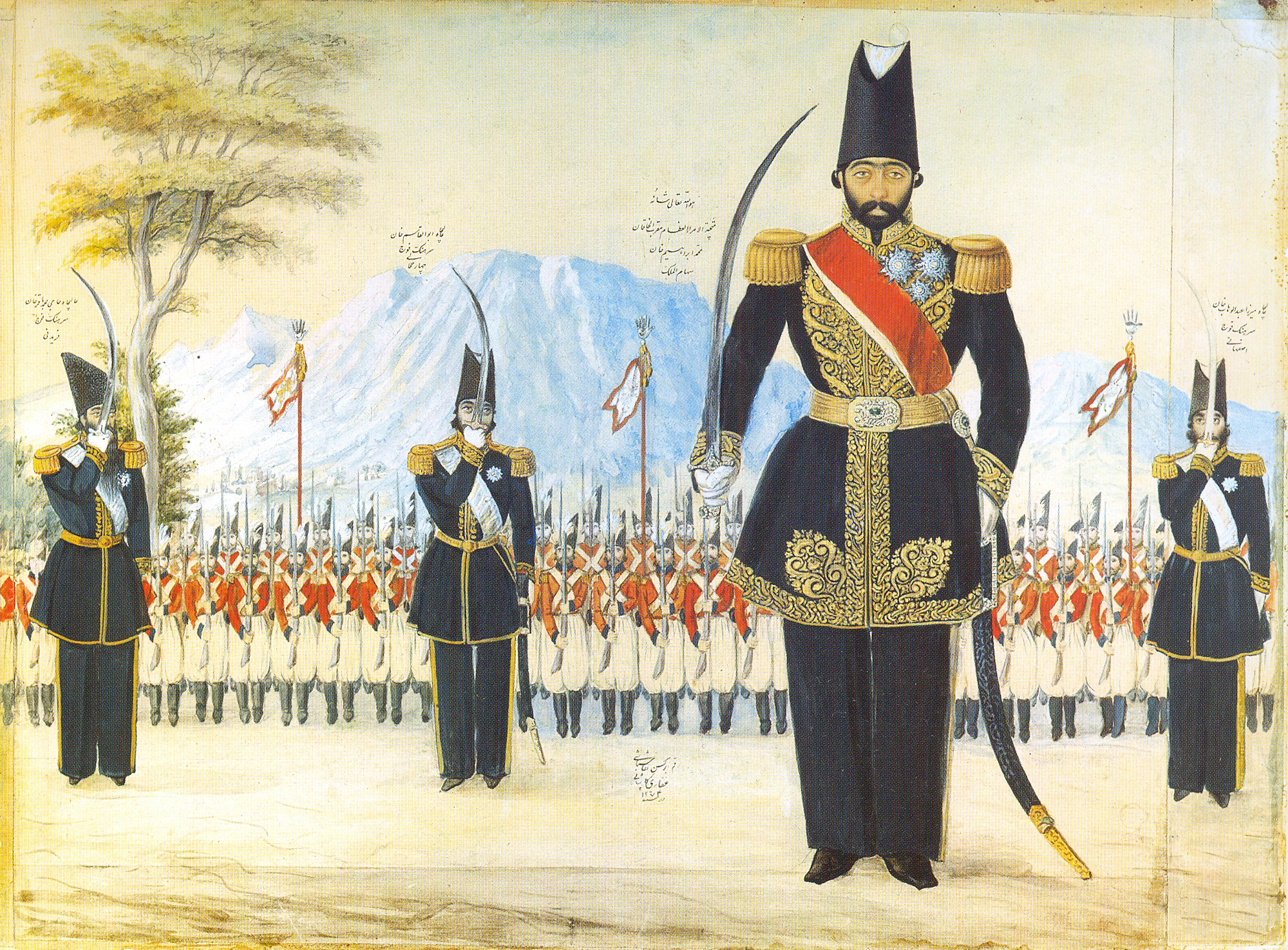
Mohammad-Ebrahim Khan Saham ol-Molk, Commander of the Isfahan Division at an inspection of the Nezam regiments in 1858

The Qajar military listed a total of 86,700 personnel on paper. However, Tehran was unable to mobilise more than 20,000 of those soldiers for battle. A sizeable portion of the Iranian army was composed of regular regiments from Azerbaijan. That division of the Iranian artillery (Toop Khaneh) was the only one well-versed in long-range guns. Out of 120 guns in total, six were composed of 12-pounder guns, while the remainder were of lower quality. The army train relied on mules, horses and camels for transportation, with carriages being limited in availability. With the exception of several Imperial Guard regiments, the Iranian army's morale was extremely low. The annual salary of an average soldier was seven tomans, with a daily subsidy of one shahi for rations. However, soldiers were considered lucky if they were paid two out of the seven tomans due for their service.

The Iranian army that fought against the British expeditionary force at the Battle of Khoshab was commanded by General (Amir-Nuyan) Mehr Ali Khan Nuri Shoja ol-Molk. In 1855, Mehr Ali Khan was promoted to the command of the Fars Army, which he held for four years. When the British invasion force landed in Iran, Shoja ol-Molk was temporarily promoted to commander-in-chief of the entire southern Iranian army. Shoja ol-Molk was a grandson of Minister of the General Staff (Vazir-e Lashkar) Mirza Assadollah Khan and a nephew of the Chancellor (Sadr-e Azam) Mirza Nasrollah Khan Nuri E’temad ol-Dowleh. He was among the most revered Iranian officers of the Qajar military at the time, and was known among the British rank and file.

The British government found itself in peculiar circumstances in the case of the war with Iran. This was a unique war in which the ultimate objective was to defeat the enemy but to ensure that its government and military would remain strong enough so as to remain stable and deter prospective advances by Russia. As such, several restrictions had been placed by the British cabinet concerning the expeditionary force's conduct:

1. No attempt shall be made to subvert the reigning Shah
2. His people shall not be instigated to rebellion
3. No Iranian subjects shall be enrolled in the ranks of the British Army

Two courses of action were available to the British: an overland expedition into Iran via Afghanistan, or an attack via the Persian Gulf, the aim being both punitive, and to force the Shah to ask for terms. In the aftermath of the disastrous First Anglo-Afghan War, the British Government were reluctant to send a force overland to relieve Herat directly, and so decided instead to attack the Persian Gulf coast. They ordered the government in India to launch a maritime expeditionary force to attack the general area of Bushehr, the primary port of entry into Iran at the time.

Initially a division, under Major General Foster Stalker, was organised comprising 2,300 British soldiers and 3,400 Indian sepoys of the Bombay Presidency army which landed in Iran in early December 1856. This included two companies of the Bombay Sappers & Miners. These were:

- The 2nd Company, under Captain C. T. Haig, (Bombay Engineers)
- The 4th Company, under Captain J. Le Mesurier, (Bombay Engineers)

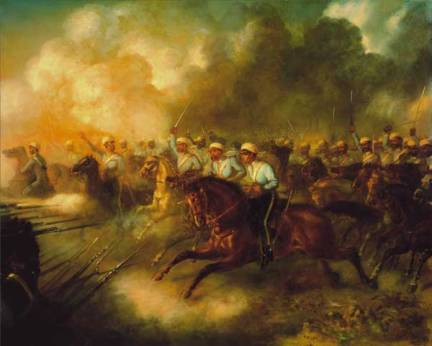
Charge of the 3rd Bombay Cavalry at the Battle of Khoshab.

The two companies were accompanied by the headquarters of the Corps of Bombay Sappers and Miners, under Captain W. R. Dickinson, (Bombay Engineers). Major J. Hill, the erstwhile Commandant of the Bombay Sappers and Miners, who had handed the Corps over to Dickinson, was appointed as the Commanding Engineer for this expedition. After the expedition he resumed the post of Commandant of the Bombay Sappers once again. Artillery commanded by Brevet Lieutenant-Colonel Sinclair Trevelyan, Bombay Artillery

- The 3rd troop Horse Brigade, commanded by Major Edward Blake, Bombay Artillery
- The 1st company 1st battalion European Foot Artillery, (Organized for the expedition as the 3rd Light Field Battery), commanded by Captain William Hatch, Bombay Artillery
- The 4th company 1st battalion European Foot Artillery, (Organized for the expedition as the 5th Light Field Battery), commanded by Captain Henry Gibbard, Bombay Artillery
- Reserve Artillery, European Foot Artillery, Bombay Artillery commanded by Major of Brigade, Captain John Pottinger

Soon after the induction of the force, it was considered to be inadequate for the task and a second division under Brigadier General Henry Havelock was formed and the entire expedition placed under command of Major General Sir James Outram. This force inducted in January 1857.

During the hostilities, 'B' Company of the Madras Sappers & Miners under Brevet-Major A. M. Boileau, Madras Engineers, embarked at Coconada on 19 January and reached the force just in time to participate in operations in Southern Mesopotamia.

The first division under Stalker set sail from Bombay in November after the declaration of war, on a squadron or flotilla of seven steamships under Commodore Young, towing thirty sailing vessels.

1st Division - (Major-General Stalker)

Cavalry Brigade - (Brigadier Tapp)

3rd Bombay Light Cavalry (243)

Poona Irregular Horse (176)

1st Brigade - (Brigadier Stopford)

HM 64th Regiment of Foot (780)

20th Regiment of Native Infantry (749)

2nd Brigade - (Brigadier Honner)

2nd Bombay European Light Infantry (693)

4th Regiment of Native Infantry (523)

2nd Baluch Battalion (460)

Artillery and Engineers

3rd Troop Horse Artillery

3rd Light Field Battery 1st coy/1st Battalion

5th Light Field Battey 4th Company/1st Battalion

Reserve Company Field Artillery

Bombay Sappers and Miners (109)

The British landed a force and captured the island of Kharag on 4 December and landed on 9 December on the coast a few miles south of Persia's primary port of Bushire.

=== Battle of Bushehr ===
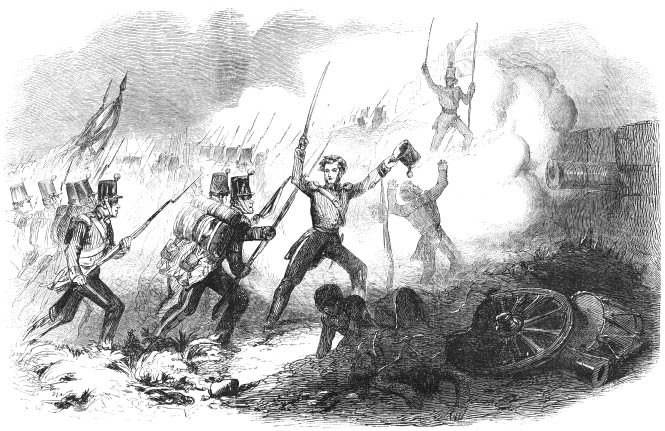
Major-general Stalker's forces lead the land assault on Bushehr on 5 December.

The first division of the expedition disembarked in the neighbourhood of the major port city of Bushehr on 5 December 1856. They stormed the old fort at Reshire (also called Rishahr or Rashir) and after a short naval bombardment went on to capture the city on 10 December, ably assisted by the two companies of Bombay Sappers & Miners. There was then a delay as the British waited for reinforcements.

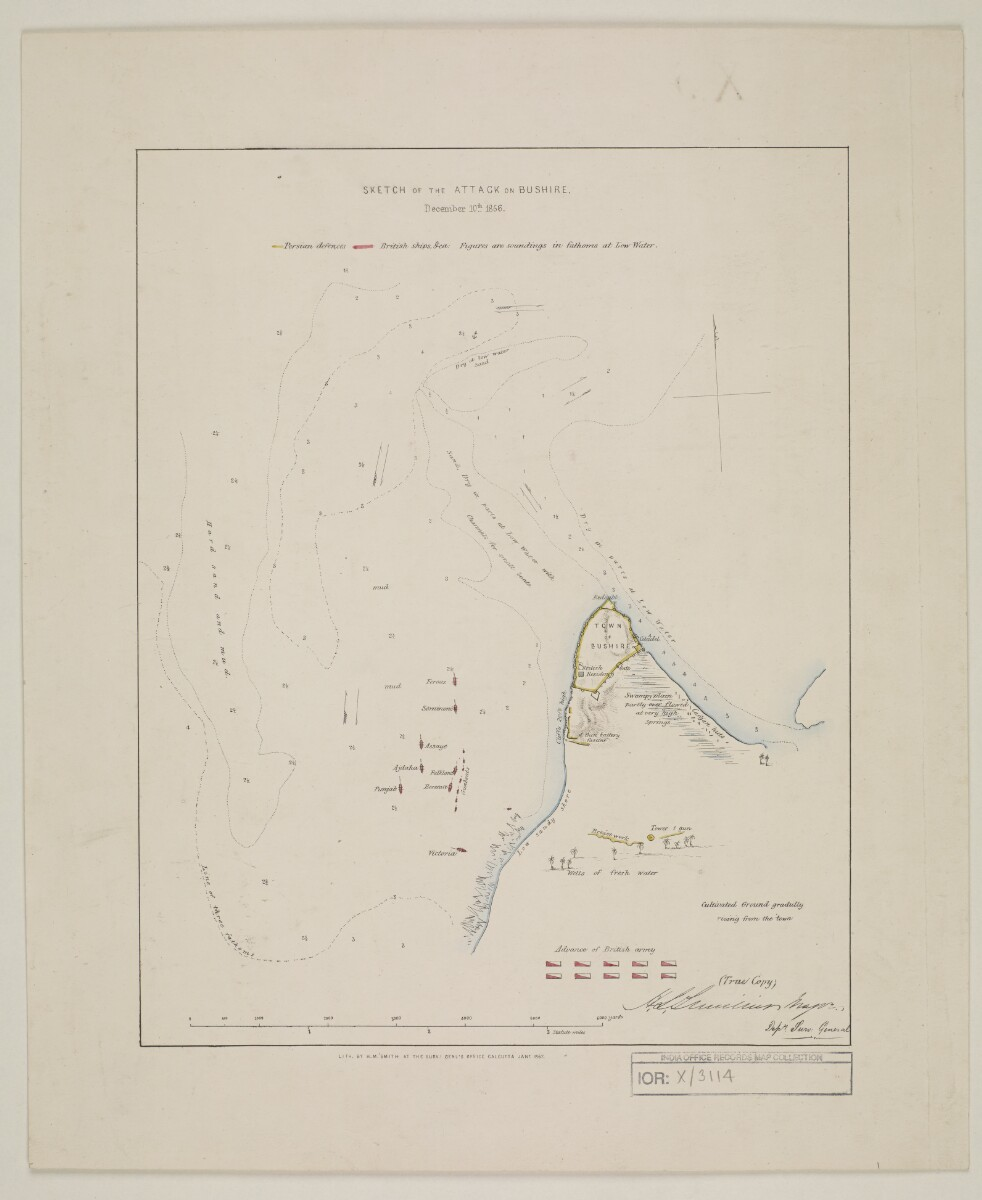
Map of the British assault on Bushehr, 1856

Reconnaissance inland revealed an Iranian force of 4,000 troops at Shiraz and the first division was considered too weak to venture inland away from its maritime base of operations. This led to the formation and induction of a second division from India, which landed in Iran in late January

2nd Division - (Brigadier General Havelock)

Cavalry Brigade - (Brigadier Tarol)

HM 13th Light Dragoons (89)

Scinde Horse (303)

1st Brigade - (Brigadier Hamilton)

HM 78th Regiment of Foot (830)

23rd Regiment of Native Infantry (749)

2nd Brigade - (Brigadier Hale)

26th Regiment of Native Infantry (716)

Composite Native Light Infantry Battalion of 10 coys (920)

Artillery and Engineers

4th Troop Horse Artillery

8th Light Field Battery 4th coy/3rd Battalion

2nd Light Field Battery 3rd coy/2nd Battalion

4th coy/4th Battalion

Madras Sappers and Miners (124)

and reached Bushehr, preceded by Outram on 20 January.

On 26 Rabi al-Thani 1273 (24 December 1856) the Iranian government at Tehran issued an official proclamation outlining its pacifist approach to the “coolness” that had arisen between the British and Iranian administrations. The Iranian government claimed that its loyal determination to not violate the prior friendship between the British and Iranian administrations had been made manifest to all levels of government and had been published in the Tehran Gazette. In hoping for a diplomatic solution by Farrokh Khan’s embassy at Constantinople, Nuri's government claimed to have directed all authorities on Iran's southern frontier to not make any preparation for war. The proclamation emphasized that this order had also been promulgated to Bushehr, where the garrison was limited to two regiments under Colonel Mohammad Ali Khan. Tehran expressed that the British declaration of war was delayed and not provided to the Iranian government or the office of the Governor-General of Fars. Instead, this declaration was addressed to the port city of Bushehr and its neighboring ports. As such, the Iranian government tried to explain the fall of Bushehr as a result of Britain's dubious declaration and Tehran's commitment to diplomacy. Following the British landing at Bushehr, the Iranian government mobilised its regular infantry to occupy positions surrounding Mohammareh as an attack was expected there. However, the Al-Nawasir branch of the Chaab tribe, violently opposed the Qajar army's occupation of an Iranian fort in their territory. The tribe inhabited the island of Menykh and Abadan, between the Arvand and Bahmanshir rivers. In a bid to show their neutrality to the British, the Al-Nawasir killed four Iranian infantrymen. Upon visiting one of Al-Nawasir chiefs in Kuwait, Outram's Arabic interpreter Reverend Badger was notified of the tribe's stance in the war.

== 1857 ==
=== Britain Mobilizes an Expeditionary Force ===
The British invasion force that was to be dispatched to the Persian Gulf in an effort to intimidate the Iranian government from further pressing its claim to Herat was eventually divided into two divisions. Sir James Outram of the Bombay army was to lead the British operations in Iran. The first division, which has conducted the landing at Bushehr was led by Major-General Stalker and Brigadier Wilson. This division was granted her Majesty's 64th Regiment, the 4th Bombay Rifles, The second division was led by Brigadier-General Havelock and Major-General Sir James Outram K.C.B., who had arrived in India from England with instructions to take over the chief command and direct the British operations in Persia. The Bombay government granted Outram the 14th King's Light Dragoons, 78th Highlanders, 23rd Native Light Infantry, 26th Native Infantry, Jacob's Scinde Horse, one troop of horse artillery, two field-batteries, and a light battalion of ten companies assorted from different native infantry regiments. While employed to command this second division of the British forces in Iran, Outram was granted the temporary rank of lieutenant-general.

The British put their ships to sea on the afternoon of 19 January. The Precursor had in tow the Earl of Clare with the 26th Native Infantry Regiment, while the British Queen carried the artillery and stores. The Pottinger towed the Futteh Mombarrak with horses and forage and the Kingston sailed with the light company of the 78th Highlanders. By 27 January, the ships at reached the Strait of Hormuz with little disruptions.

By 28 January, the party was off Basaidu, on the island of Qeshm. Two days later, the French frigate Sibylle commanded by Captain Maisonneuve passed the British ships. The French ship had left Bombay eight days prior on a mission to the Persian Gulf to protect French interests there. On 30 January, the British squadron anchored off of Bushehr around 2:00 PM. The next morning, the British command gave orders to disembark and join the force already stationed at the encampment. With the arrival of the reinforcements, supplies were plentiful in the camp.

By 6:00 PM on the afternoon of 3 February, the entire force was raised outside of the entrenchments in two lines of contiguous quarter-distance columns. Led by Outram, the army marched through the night to the village of Chahkootah. A few hours before the British army arrived, a Qajar cavalry picket had stopped at the village before continuing their patrol. At 4:00 PM on 4 February, Outram resumed the march with arms loaded. By the morning of 5 February, the British army travelled towards Borazjan, where the Persian army had been entrenched with 18 guns. Charles Murray, the Minister Plenipotentiary to Iran, had given Outram the aid of Mirza Agha, the Iranian Secretary of Her Majesty's Mission to Iran. Mirza Agha, whose appointment was the subject of dispute between the British Foreign Office and the Iranian government, accompanied Outram on the expedition to Borazjan.

=== Capture of Borazjan ===
Shortly before 1:00 PM, the approaching British army saw the Iranian garrison's vedettes and reconnoitering parties. By the time the British regiments had moved into their positions, the Iran army decided to withdraw from Borazjan and avoid a direct confrontation there. The Iranian army under command of Gen. (Amir-Nuyan) Mehr Ali Khan Shoja ol-Molk was misinformed by his reconnaissance units that the British were advancing with 13,000 infantry, 1,000 cavalry, and 28 guns. The Iranian justification for the hasty withdrawal was to prevent high casualties from the overestimated size of the British forces and the expected explosion of the unsecured ammunition stored at Borazjan. To cover its retreat, the Iranian army left behind a rear-guard, which confronted a few of the British cavalry. The hasty Iranian withdrawal left great amounts of ammunition and grain in the hands of their enemy.

==== Southern Iranian Army ====
In his dispatches, Outram had sized the Iranian garrison in Borazjan at 8,450 regular infantry and cavalry, with 17 guns and a mortar. The general noted that Tehran had planned to extend its reinforcements to 12 regiments of regular infantry with 35 guns, while the provincial governors were preparing to conscript 4,000 irregular infantry from among the local tribes. Outram's sense of urgency in his letter to the Governor-General of India dated 14 February 1857 was visible through his concern for the prospective loss of Bushehr should Iran raise a larger than expected army.

Tahmasp Mirza Mo’ayed ol-Dowleh was the Governor-General (Nawab Vala) of the province of Fars during the Anglo-Persian War. By order of Tahmasp Mirza, the 1st Arab Regiment of Brig. Gen. (Sartip) Reza Qoli Khan Arab, stationed in Kazerun, was to join the other regional regiments raised under Shoja ol-Molk. For the duration of the war, Tahmasp Mirza granted Reza Qoli Khan control of the Inanlu and Baharlu regiments. On 14 Jumada l-Ula, Reza Qoli Khan left the Iranian encampment with a contingent of 400 from the 1st Arab Regiment and 2 field guns to gather additional rations and supplies for the province's defense. During his sortie, Reza Qoli Khan was joined by 300 troops from the 1st Qashqai Regiment with one piece of artillery.

Shoja ol-Molk's garrison at Borazjan included the following regiments:

Regiment or Unit	Strength
Regiment of Khamseh	800
4th Regiment of Tabriz	800
1st Regiment of Shiraz	600
1st Arab Regiment	800
1st Qaragozlu Regiment of Shiraz	500
2nd Qaragozlu Regiment of Shiraz	500
Shah Selman Regiment	400
Regiment of Shaskar	800
Tofangchi Infantry	1,000
Eelyaut Horse	400
Afshar Cavalry	750
Irregular troops from Shiraz	400

==== March Back to Bushehr and Persian Army Ambush ====
The British army then commenced the march back to Bushehr at 8:00 PM on 7 February, after plundering the garrison's stores and taking the town's governor as prisoner. At 11:00 PM, the Qashqai cavalry contingent of 300 under command of Sohrab Khan Qashqai ambushed the British encampment. Shortly after midnight, Iranian forces descended on the British rear-guard who returned musket fire and deployed two of their horse-artillery guns. The Iranian cavalry contingent surrounded the British force on all sides and galloped around them. The Iranian cavalrymen aimed to instill fear and cause confusion among the British rank and file by sounding English bugle-calls. Given that English officers were once employed by the Qajar military, the Iranian army was well-versed in several standard bugle-calls that the British used. The buglers of the Qashqai cavalry sounded a “Cease Fire” and “Incline to the Left” order which had no effect on the Highlanders, but the 20th Native Infantry reportedly stopped firing, thinking that it was their own force firing on them. The Iranian light skirmishers fired a salvo and then stopped firing in that direction. The Iranian cavalry engaged the 78th Highlanders head on at various points during the skirmish. The British army adopted an oblong formation as the five heavy guns of the Iranian artillery opened fire with round shots. While the Iranian artillery had calculated the range very accurately, there were few casualties given the lengthy bombardment. However, one shot dealt considerable damage to the 64th Regiment and took off a foot from Lieutenant Greentree, while severely wounding Captain Mackler. During this engagement, Outram's horse fell and rolled over him, rendering the general incapacitated for the duration of the ambush. The Chief of his staff, Colonel Lugard took command of the British forces and quietly covered the mishap, ensuring few others knew of Outram's condition until the next morning.

=== Battle of Khoshab ===
The Iranian guns continued to fire on British positions until dawn. The Iranian army had gathered near the British encampment and prepared for a battle. Ravanji cites the Iranian army as 7,000 troops in total while Sandes lists the Iranian troops as being 8,000 strong, composed of 6,000 infantry and 2,000 cavalry. On the morning of 8 February, the Iranian army under Shoja ol-Molk drew up in line with the right flank of its infantry resting on the walled village of Khushab. The left flank of the Iranian army was covered by a round fortalice tower. Shoja ol-Molk had ordered two rising mounds placed at the center of the Iranian infantry. He ordered the bulk of the Iranian guns placed at the center and had deep nullahs covering the right front and flank. The Qashqai cavalry was led by Sohrab Khan, the hereditary chief of the Qashqai peoples native to the region. As the morning mist cleared, the two sides began firing their cannons at each other's positions.

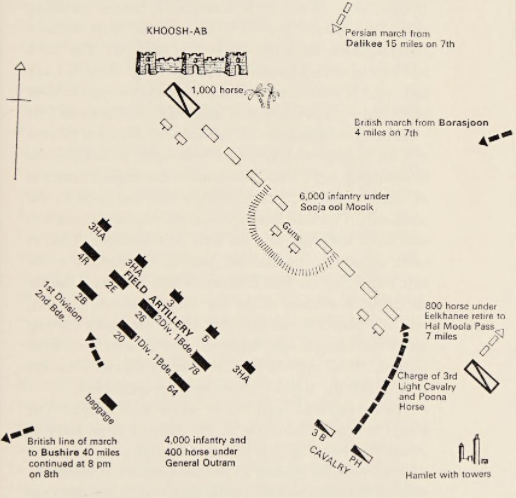
A diagram depicting the Battle of Khoshab in its entirety, illustrated in English's The War for a Persian Lady.

The British brigades began maneuvering into different positions, moving up as they deployed. The British army formed two lines, with the first consisting of the 78th Highlanders and a contingent of Indian sappers to their right, the rest included the 26th Regiment Native Infantry, the 2nd European Light Infantry, and the 4th Rifle Regiment at the far-left of the line. The second line included her Majesty's 64th Regiment to the right, the 20th Regiment Native Infantry, and the Belooch Battalion to the left. Outram placed the light infantry battalions to counter the Qajar centre, while a detachment of the 3rd Cavalry covered the Qashqai Cavalry. The Governor of Borazjan was present at the British rear but was forced off his horse to his knees when attempting to signal the Iranian army to his presence.

The Iranian rank and file included the 1st Qashqai Regiment, which took position on the left of the Iranian line. Other native units included the Regiment of Bushehr, the Regiment of Kazerun, and the Qaragozlu regiments from Shiraz. Jahangir Khan and Lotfali Khan Qashqai were the commanding officers of the 1st Qashqai Regiment. Reza Qoli Khan Arab commanded the Inanlu, Baharlu and 1st Arab Regiment. The Qashqai Cavalry Regiment was divided into two detachments, with Sohrab Khan leading a contingent of 800 cavalrymen on the left flank. A division of 1,000 cavalry covered the right flank beside the defensive walls of Khoshab. Two artillery squadrons were positioned at the centre of the Iranian army, while four other squadrons manned the 9-pounder brass guns on either flank each. The Persian army relied primarily on the Sarbaz from its reformed Nezam Regiments as opposed to the irregular infantry outside the auspices of the Qajar military. As such, Shoja ol-Molk refused to consider inviting the Tangestani Braves (Daliran-e Tangestan) to the defense of Borazjan.

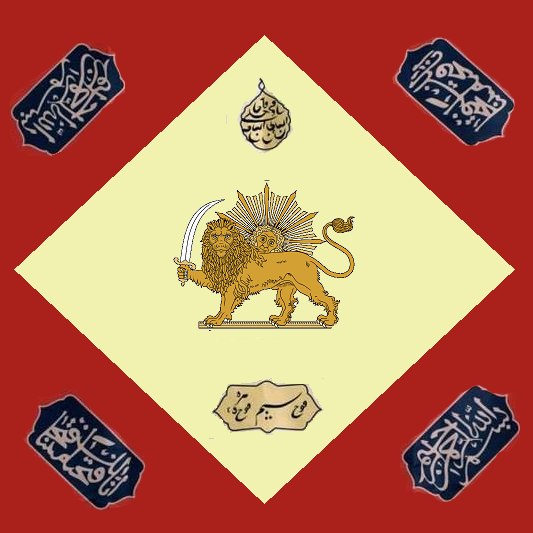
A modern rendition of the standard of the Iranian Nezam Infantry Regiments during Naser al-Din Shah's reign.

As the British lines advanced, Hunt and Townsend cite few casualties among the Highlanders and 26th Native Infantry but note that the first brigade, first division fared worse against the Iranian bombardment. The second brigade, first division is noted to have suffered equally with more dead among the 2nd European Light Infantry. The British artillery resumed the firing after advancing to closer action, which slackened the degree of the Iranian bombardment. Sohrab Khan charged forward with the Qashqai cavalry on the Iranian left flank which were met halfway by the squadrons of the 3rd Cavalry and Tapp's irregulars. The British cavalry were supported by horse-artillery. The British focus on the Iranian left flank managed to push back the cavalry under Sohrab Khan, which eventually retired to the Haj Mollah Pass, 7 miles away from the battlefield.

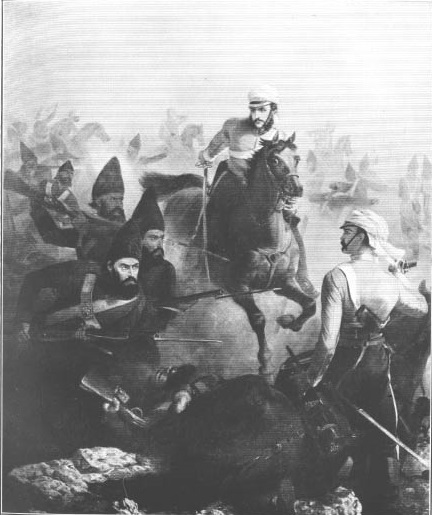
Lieutenants Malcolmson and Moore fighting through the 1st Qashqai Regiment's infantry square at the Battle of Khoshab.

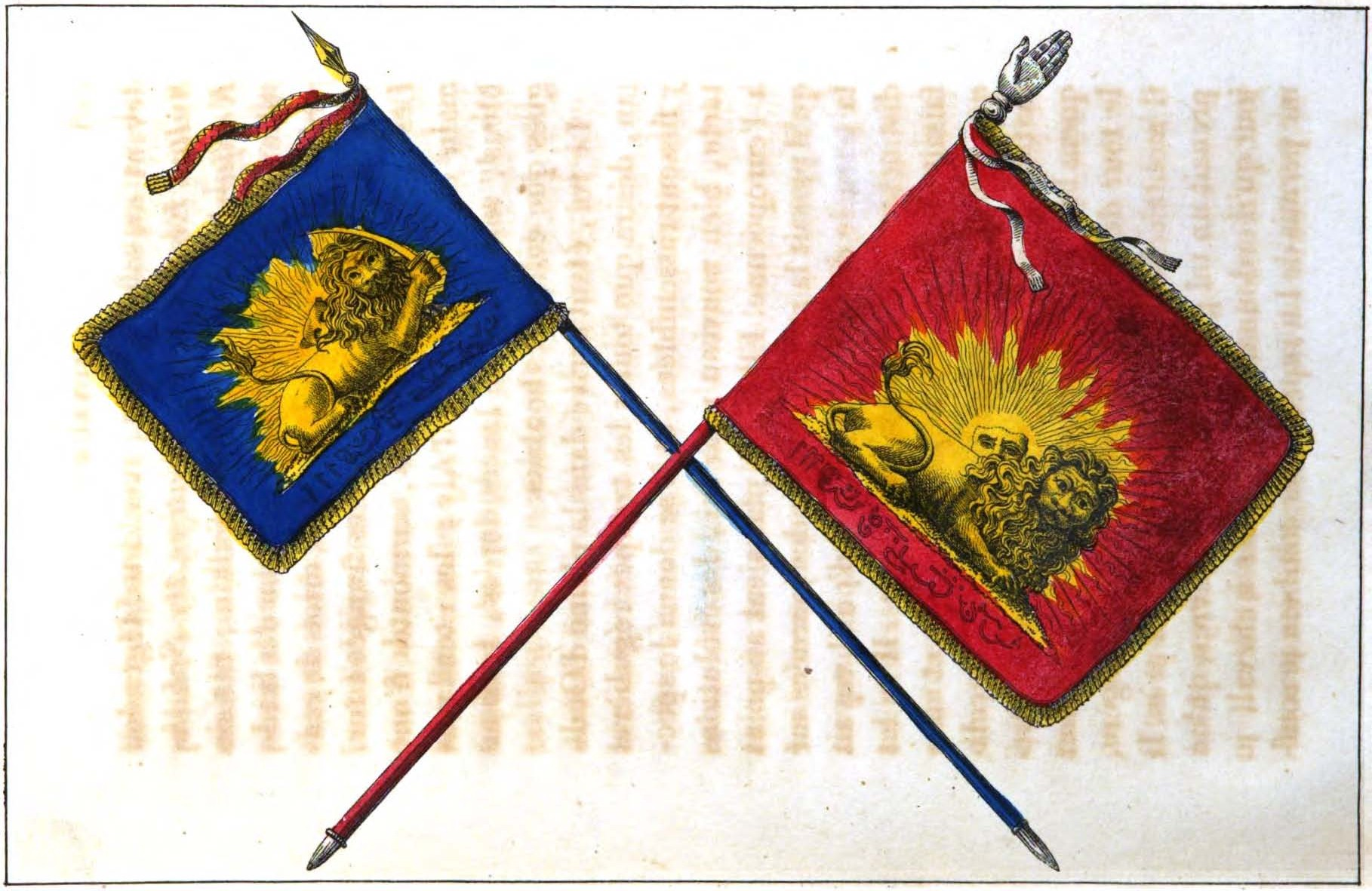
A conventional standard of the Iranian Nezam Infantry Regiments (right) from 1807 to 1848. The Silver Hand of Ali surmounts the standard.

The British infantry lines rapidly advanced to meet the Iranian army in closer action. As the British cavalry advanced on the right, the 3rd Bombay Light Cavalry and the Poona Horse charged the Nezam Infantry Regiments on the left flank of the Iranian line. Under musket and cannon fire, the 1st Qashqai Regiment of Fars entered an infantry square formation with kneeling ranks and sustained the charge of the 3rd Cavalry. The Iranian infantry fired volleys at the charging British cavalrymen. In the close action, the Iranian regiment's standard-bearer was shot, and the standard was taken by the 3rd Cavalry. The regimental flag of the 1st Qashqai was surmounted by a silver hand that signifies the Hand of Imam Ali. The standard, which has the phrase “God’s hand is above all things” (يد الله فوق عداهم) etched into it, now rests atop the Poona Horse Regiment's standard. For publicity, the English media capitalized on the action as the most gallant event of the war. Two Victoria Crosses were awarded to the Commander's Adjutant Lieutenant Arthur Thomas Moore for first breaking into the square, and Captain John Grant Malcolmson. Upon charging the 1st Qashqai's square, Moore's horse was shot and bayoneted, falling on its rider. The 21 one year old Malcolmson, a lieutenant of the 3rd Bombay Cavalry managed to extricate his comrade.

The infantry to the right of the Iranian left flank began fleeing in a disorderly manner, despite no major altercation with the British lines in front. In contrast, Townshend and Hunt highlight that the Nezam Regiments protecting the Iranian left flank soon retired with order. As the Iranian line began to waver, the Poona Horse spiked the two guns on the Iranian left. The Iranian cavalry regiments remained on the battlefield, posing a threat to the British rear and the wounded. However, the long range of the new Enfield rifles hindered the Iranian cavalry, which made off before 10:00 AM. The British record cited one officer and 18 men killed, with four officers and 60 wounded. Other records, however, cite 220 killed and 64 wounded. The British claimed the Iranian casualties to be approximately 700, and considered the battle a British victory. Despite the victory, Outram decided not to advance further towards Shiraz. The British army was short on rations and could not withstand a mountain pursuit. The Iranian government published a different version of Khoshab, considering the battle to be an Iranian victory in which the British casualties amounted to 1,000 killed and wounded.

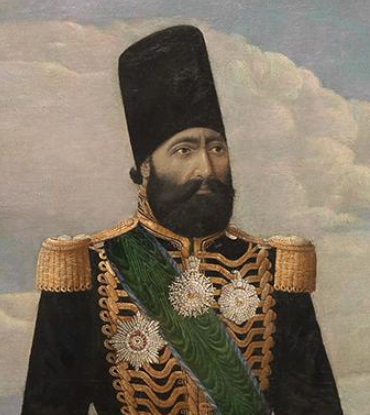
Portrait of Mirza Mohammad Khan Qajar-Davalu at the annual Royal Inspection (San Didan) of Qajar troops at Mashq Square.

By 10:00 AM, the British army regrouped a short distance to the right of the battlefield before resuming the march back to Bushehr. Out of fear of the raids and ambushes by Tangestani guerilla fighters, the British army decided against taking the road from Chahkootah. Outram instead made his way to Shif and took the coastal passage back to Bushehr. Despite Outram's decision, the British expedition through Shif was still met by an ambush from the guerilla fighters of Ziarat. Shoja ol-Molk had retreated to Khesht and wrote despondently to the Shah that the Iranian army was in dire need of reinforcements after the battle. By 14 February, Tehran had decided to relieve Shoja ol-Molk of his command due to the retreat at the Battle of Khoshab. Mirza Mohammad Khan Qajar-Dolu, Commandant of the Shah's Bodyguard was to assume command of the southern Iranian army. Mirza Mohammad Khan set out to reorganize the Fars division with equipment costing 50,000 tomans, gold-mounted swords, and robes of honour. Mirza Mohammad Khan would later gain the title of generalissimo (Sepahsalar) and be elected as Iran's first minister of war. The commandant was accompanied by Hamzeh Mirza Qajar Heshmat ol-Dowleh, the Shah's uncle. Hamzeh Mirza had been the Governor-General of Khorasan, and had returned to Tehran after failing to quell the rebellion of Hasan Khan Salar. He would later become the minister of war in 1868, employing Kamran Mirza Nayeb ol-Saltaneh as his representative for the role instead. Hamzeh Mirza's royal presence granted the new leadership of the Iranian army the full powers to negotiate with Outram. However, at this stage the Qajar court had not given any indications of a desire to communicate with the British expeditionary force.

The British army resumed its march back to Bushehr but in deplorable conditions; torrential rains created mud deep enough to pull a man's boots from his feet. The troops went through a harrowing ordeal but finally reached Bushire on 10 February:

The troops had covered 46 miles in 41 hours to meet the enemy, a further 20 miles over the most difficult country during the night after the battle, and after a rest of 6 hours, another 24 miles to Bushire.

— E.W.C. Sandes in the Indian Sappers and Miners (1948).

=== Return to Bushehr ===
In deplorable conditions, the British army marched back to the encampment at Bushehr the entire night of the battle, halting for daylight at 4:00 AM. Pitiless rains and winds formed a swamp with knee-deep waters around the British battalions. The British troops reached the village of Choghadak between Chahkootah and Bushehr by 10:00 AM. On 9 February, the troops halted at the village's well until 2:00 PM amid heavy rainfall. The regiments reached the camp on the morning of 10 February. During the two or three days of rest, Brigadier-General Havelock took command of the second division and Brigadier Hamilton took control of the division's first brigade. The British army began constructing a sequence of redoubts and a Martello tower at the center of their entrenchment. During this time, heavy rain and damp weather persisted, making rest more difficult. Several companies of the light battalion and guns from the mountain train joined the British force during this period. The arrival of the 23rd Native Light Infantry and a troop of horse artillery contributed to motivation for contemplated attack on Mohammareh. In anticipation of a potential assault on Mohammareh, the Iranian military focused its best available batteries there. Outram believed that the Iranian government could not raise more troops beyond those stationed at Mohammareh and the army the British faced at Khushab. Outram did not expect the Shah to recall his expeditionary force under Soltan Morad Mirza Hesam ol-Saltaneh from Herat. The British believed that they could coerce the Shah into accepting their demands by employing the semi-autonomous demographic of Iran's northwest against the Iranian government. Namely, Outram believed that the Chaab, Bakhtiari and Feyli were particularly resistant to Iranian authority and considered negotiating an alliance with them. This idea made Mohammareh more strategically significant for the British army.

==== The Iranian Army Under Mirza Mohammad Khan ====
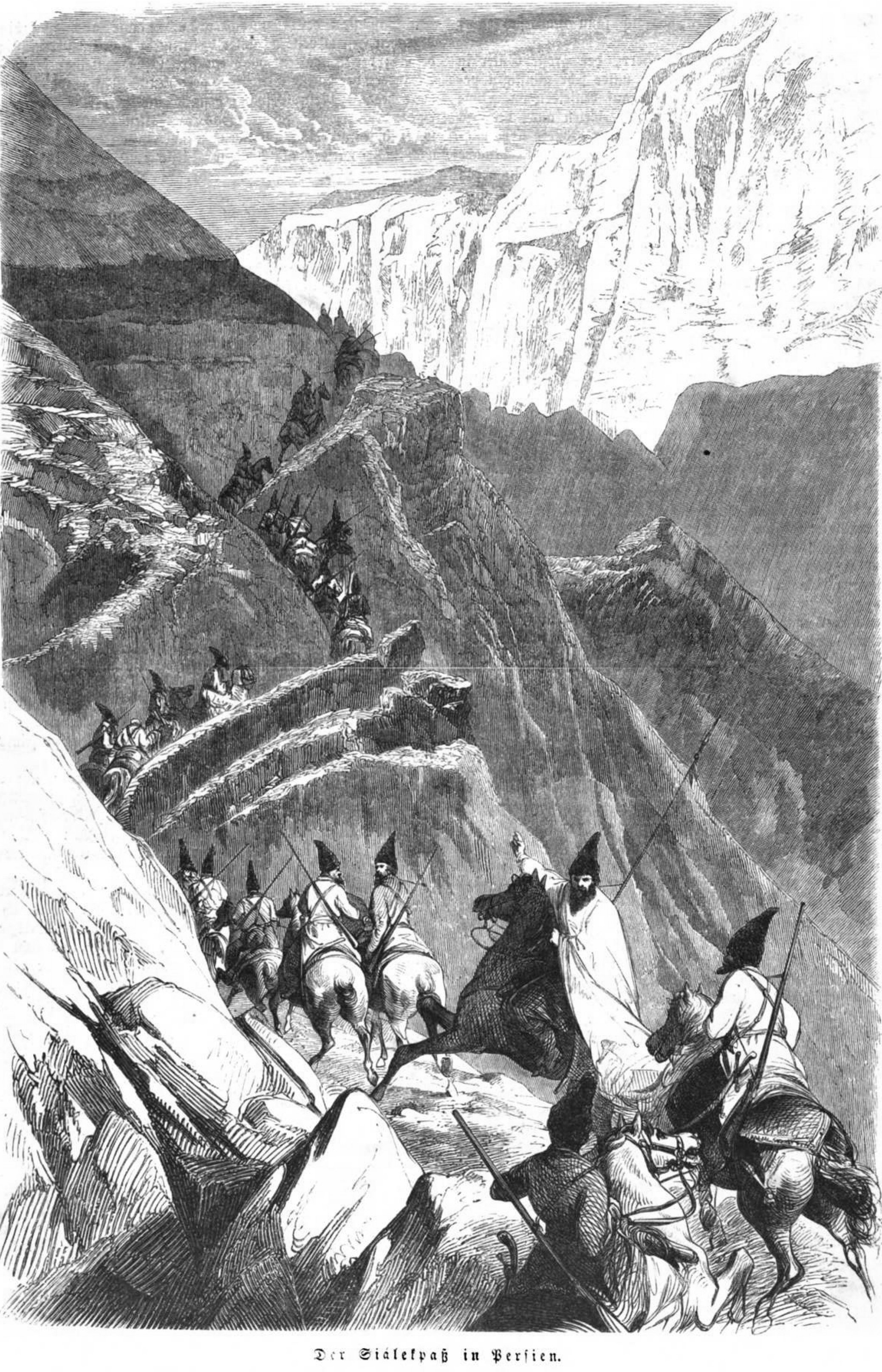
The Iranian cavalry travelling through the Sialak Pass in 1857.

By 22 February, Iranian troops encroached on the British encampment at Bushehr but did not engage. The British reported seeing the fires of the enemy on the hills surrounding their camp. In response, the Poona Horse expanded the range of its patrols, but did not report any confrontations. In his correspondence with Governor-General Canning, Outram reported that the total size of the new forces raised between Shiraz and Khesht for Mirza Mohammad Khan's army was 27,800 men with 85 guns. Of this army, 2,000 were attributed to cavalry, 3,000 tofangchi infantry (Musketeers), and 31 regiments of regular infantry at 800 each. This army was exclusive of the 10,000 to 13,000 troops and 16 guns estimated to be garrisoned at Mohammareh under Prince Khanlar Mirza. Governor-General Tahmasp Mirza commanding several regiments, advanced from Shiraz to Nanizak. He was to await the arrival of General Mirza Mohammad Khan Qajar-Dolu, at which point he would take over all of his troops and return to Shiraz. Jafar Qoli Khan Ilkhani was stationed at Shiraz with a cavalry detachment of 3,000. Mohammad Khan had made his way to Farashband with his troops and had ordered several contingents to rendezvous at Nanizak by 6 March to form a larger army fit to assault Bushehr. Brigadier-General Fuzl Ali Khan was stationed at Khesht with 10 guns, five regiments and 1,000 cavalry. Brigadier-General Mirza Ibrahim Khan was at Sarkoreh with his troops. The three contingents were to make their way to Nanizak through different roads so as to not exhaust the provisions on the route. The Iranian general himself led a contingent of four regiments with eight guns and 1,500 cavalry. The British intelligence report from 27 February estimated that the southern Persian force was 24 regiments, 31 guns and 5,000 cavalry strong. The report further projected 4,000 tofangchis could be conscripted from among the local inhabitants.

=== Battle of Mohammareh ===
The British then shifted their focus north up the Persian Gulf, invading Southern Mesopotamia by advancing up the Shatt al-Arab waterway to Mohammerah at its junction with the Karun River, short of Basra. The force collected for the sortie consisted of 1,500 British and 2,400 Indian soldiers. The engineers grouped with the force included 2nd Company, Bombay Sappers & Miners (with 109 troops under Captain Haig) and B Company, Madras Sappers & Miners (with 124 troops under Brevet-Major Boileau). Outram decided that Major-General Stalker was to remain in command at Bushehr along with Brigadiers Wilson, Honnor, and Tapp. The troops that would stay in the encampment included two field batteries, the mountain-train, the entire cavalry of the first division, three companies from her Majesty's 64th and the 78th Highlanders, the 4th rifles, 20th Native Infantry, and the Belooch battalion. The force at Bushehr numbered around 3,000. This left just under 4,000 troops under the command of Outram.

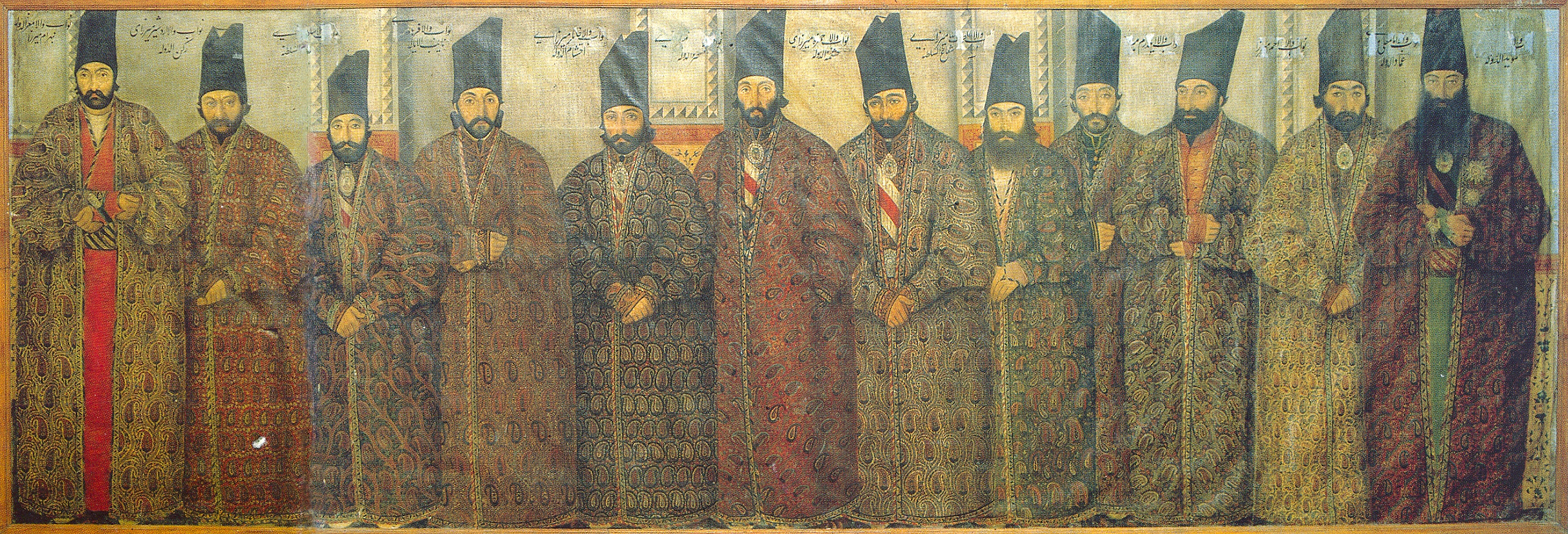
Khanlar Mirza (fifth from the left), among Abbas Mirza's other sons at the Nezamiyeh Hall (by Sani-ol-Molk)

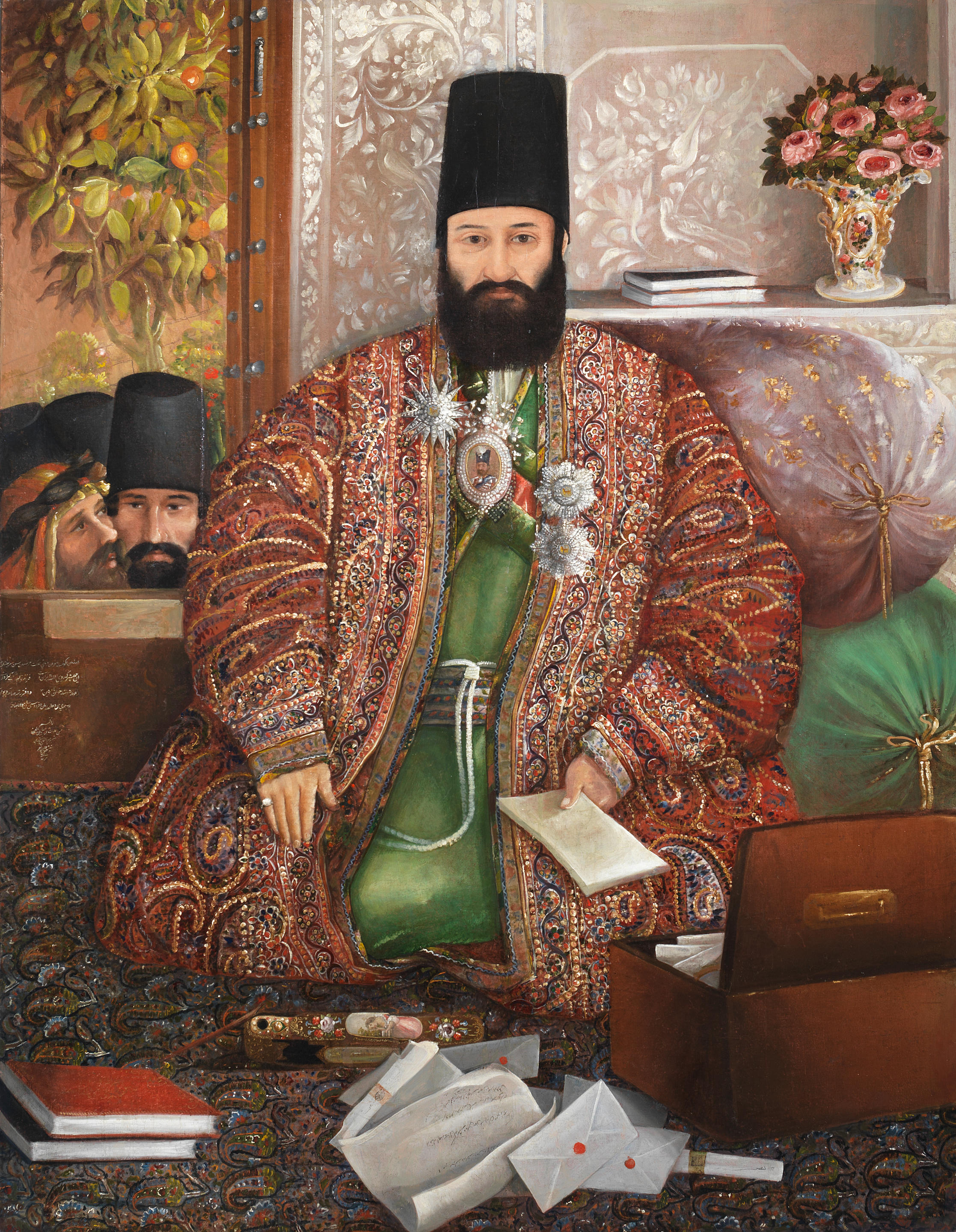
A portrait of the Governor of Khuzestan, possibly Khanlar Mirza Ehtesham ol-Dowleh, just over the age of 40. The portrait was dated November 1866 and inscribed by Zayn al-'Abidin al-Husayni.

By this point, the defence of Mohammareh was given to Prince Khanlar Mirza commanding seven regular regiments composed of 13,000 infantry and cavalry in total. The Iranian army had undertaken an effort to develop extensive defensive infrastructure along the city's coastline and Khanlar Mirza now had 17 guns placed along the defenses in anticipation of the British attack. Khanlar Mirza Ehtesham-ed-Dowleh was the 17th son of the late Abbas Mirza and an uncle to Naser al-Din Shah. At the time of the Anglo-Persian War, Khanlar Mirza was the magistrate of Mazandaran and Khuzestan. The works of the fort at Mohammareh were 20 feet thick, and the Persian heavy guns were placed on the river face with a range of around 100 yards. The British army would counter the Iranian bombardment with the broadsides of the Clive and Falkland sloops as well as the Ajdaha, Feroze, Semiramis, Victoria, and Assaye steamers. Besides its defences, Mohammerah was further protected by the political requirement of the British not violating Ottoman territory, as the city lay right on the border.

On 6 March, the Falkland sailed for the Euphrates, while the 64th regiment sailed on the Bride of the Sea. On the same day, the Feroze, Pottinger, and Pioneer steamers brought a troop of horse artillery and a contingent of the Scinde Horse, reinforcing Outram's confidence of an attack on Mohammareh. That afternoon, the Kingston and four other transports sailed towards Kharg island where a detachment of the 4th rifles had been left to secure a coaling station for the British navy. On the morning of 8 March, the Falkland reached the mouth of the Euphrates. As the other ships reached the anchorage in the river, Iranian cavalry patrols took sight of the enemy. One of the superior officer's of Khanlar Mirza's army held a military inspection of 3,000 infantry in sight of the British ships near the coast as a show of force. The British troops were also made aware of a considerable detachment of irregular cavalry and infantry occupying the village of Mahamur, where pickets had been constructed along some ruined buildings. Upon his return from a visit to Mohammareh, Captain Maisonneuve warned the British troops that the Iranian defences were formidable and that Outram's forces could not easily take them. By 15 March, the Berenice steamer brought the headquarters of the Highlanders with Brigadier-General Havelock and the staff of the second division. Lieutenant Sinclair of the 78th Highlanders had died a few days prior to departure due to fever. By 17 March, as the Pioneer reached the anchorage, news spread that Major-General Foster Stalker had committed suicide in the night of 14 March. Hunt & Townshend and Ballard cite Stalker's main motive for suicide as a loss of mental balance and macular degeneration. However, Granny sees the suicide as arising out of disagreement with Outram's idea of pushing into Iran's interior. Watson likewise cites the suicide as stemming from the unbearable responsibility of defending Bushehr against the growing southern Iranian army of Mirza Mohammad Khan. Consequently, Outram decided to remain in command at Bushehr and at first, left the execution of the British objectives in Mohammareh to Havelock. At this time, one troop of horse artillery returned to Bushehr as the prospect of an Iranian attack became more imminent. Eventually, Outram himself joined the troops anchored near Mohammareh with a contingent of the Scinde Horse and dragoons. Outram left Colonel John Jacob in command of the garrison at Bushehr. In the night of 17 March, Commodore Richard Ethersey, who Rear Admiral Henry Leeke had appointed in command of the British navy at Bushehr, also committed suicide.

The British force remained anchored until 23 March, with ships transporting troops and horses on an hourly basis throughout the day. By 24 March, the rendezvous point was set to three miles below the Iranian fortifications. As some of the British forces disembarked and assembled, a considerably large party of Persian reconnoitrers sighted the enemy within firing range. However, the Iranian troops did not engage the British. By the night of 25 March, several hundred Iranian soldiers were seen throwing up an embankment to cover two of their field guns which were to be positioned towards the British positions. The Assaye was soon ordered to fire eight shells at the Iranian positions, forcing the artillerymen to retreat. On the same night, the British placed two 8 and two 5-inch mortars northward behind a low swampy island facing the Persian army's most powerful battery. This endeavour was undertaken by the engineer officers that also conducted a reconnaissance of the Iranian guns in a small canoe. They first planned to erect a battery on an island in the Arvand, but the island proved to be too swampy. They then towed the mortars on a raft and moored it behind the island from where fire support was provided.

At dawn on 26 March, the mortars from the raft placed by the swampy island, commanded by Captain Worgan, opened fire on into the centre of the Persian fortifications. The Iranian soldiers were noted to have been mid-prayer for Fajr. The first shots wounded the Iranian Brigadier commanding the northern battery. As such, it took Khanlar Mirza's artillerymen a few minutes to identify where the missiles came from. As the Iranian batteries began to return fire by 6:00 AM, the British attack ships advanced and began to engage them. The Semiramis led the squadron and towed the Clive sloop and was followed by the Ajdaha, Feroze, Assaye and Victoria. The Victoria towed the Falkland sloop as she got into position. The Madras Sappers were also aboard the S.S. Hugh Lindsay to assist the 64th Regiment in firing the ship's carronades The Iranian batteries opened fire along the entire line of defence, inflicting considerable damage on the hulls and rigging of the British ships. Arab inhabitants on the Turkish side of the border had gathered to watch the battle, but as some of the Iranian shots ricocheted in their direction, they dispersed. By 7:45 AM, the British commodore ordered the ships to close in on the forts, all anchoring except for the Assaye. The British attack ships and the Iranian batteries continued to fire on each other for three hours, while the British transports remained patiently at anchorage. At this point, Commodore Rennie hoisted the signal for the British flotilla carrying the troops. The Iranian guns managed to cut the rigging and damage the hull of the Berenice, which carried Havelock and the 78th Highlanders, as she entered within 100 yards of the Iranian battery. The transports disembarked about 100 yards above the Persian army's north battery. The disembarkation lasted an hour and went unopposed. As the Iranian batteries fell silent, the brigadiers of their army, which was situated behind the fortifications, retreated while the British troops were called to halt to properly arrange their lines. The Iranians effectively abandoned the city to a British force under Brigadier Henry Havelock, which captured it on 27 March. Khormuji sees the reason for the Iranian retreat as resulting from confusion caused by an order from Tehran and the Iranian border coast guard to avoid direct conflict the British navy due to their superior maritime prowess and their 66-pound cannons. The British reported 41 casualties at the Battle of Mohammareh. A further five were wounded when two of their pickets accidentally fired on one another as the British troops attempted to chase down the retreating Iranian army into the night. The Iranian army of 13,000 made its way to Ahvaz along the Karun river.

=== Battle of Ahvaz ===
The sappers were now continually employed in destroying Iranian batteries, making roads, landing stages and huts in the unhealthy climate and so could not be spared for the sortie to Ahvaz, where the Royal Navy and forces from the 64th Foot and 78th Highlanders attacked the Iranian force. The town fell to the British on 1 April 1857.

=== Treaty of Paris (1857) ===
On returning to Muhammarah on 4 April, the force learned that a treaty had been signed in Paris on 4 March, and hostilities ceased. When news of peace arrived, Outram was planning an invasion into the Iranian interior that likely would have significantly escalated the war. The expeditionary force had thus successfully carried out its purpose by capturing Bushire, defeating the Iranians at Khosh-Ab and capturing a foothold in southern Mesopotamia, thus forcing the Iranians to sue for terms. Over the next few months, the force returned to India. In October, the British withdrew from Bushehr. Most of the forces were soon inducted into operations in Central India to quell the Indian Rebellion of 1857 in which both Havelock and Outram would distinguish themselves at the siege of Lucknow.

== Diplomacy ==
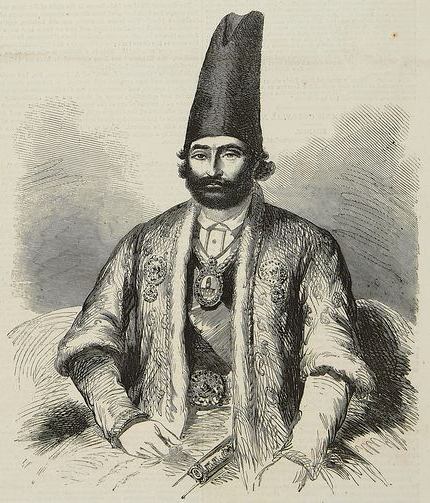
Farrokh Khan in The Illustrated London News, 1857.

Negotiations in Constantinople between Iranian Ambassador Farrokh Khan and British Ambassador Stratford de Redcliffe ultimately broke down over British demands for the Iranians to replace their prime minister (Sadr-e Azam). News of the onset of fighting resulted in a formal rupture of talks, but discussions soon began again in Paris, and both sides signed a peace treaty on 4 March in which the Shah agreed to withdraw from Herat and to refrain from further interference in the affairs of Afghanistan. In the treaty, the Iranians agreed to withdraw from Herat, to apologise to the British ambassador on his return, to sign a commercial treaty, and to co-operate in suppressing the slave trade in the Persian Gulf. The British agreed not to shelter opponents of the Shah in the embassy and abandoned the demand of replacing the prime minister and requiring territorial concessions to the Imam of Muscat, a British ally.

The Iranians faithfully withdrew from Herat, which allowed the British to return their troops to India, where they were soon needed for combat in the Indian Rebellion of 1857. Herat returned to more direct Afghan control when it was retaken by Dost Mohammed Khan in 1863.

The loss of Herat, akin to the earlier loss of the Caucasian provinces, illustrated the limitations on authority over territories that were historically and culturally part of Greater Iran. Despite their deep-rooted ties, these areas could no longer be sustained as provinces within the Guarded Domains of Iran.

== Gallantry awards ==
Three Victoria Crosses were awarded during the expedition to captain John Augustus Wood, captain John Grant Malcolmson and lieutenant Arthur Thomas Moore.

== Battle honours ==
A total of four battle honours were awarded for this campaign, namely, 'Persia', 'Reshire', and 'Koosh-Ab' in 1858, and 'Bushire' in 1861.

=== Persia ===
The battle honour 'Persia' was awarded to all units that had participated in the campaign vide Gazette of the Governor General 1306 of 1858. The units were:

- 3rd Bombay Cavalry – currently Poona Horse
- Poona Irregular Horse – currently Poona Horse
- 1st Scinde Irregular Horse – currently Scinde Horse
- Madras Sappers & Miners – currently Madras Engineer Group
- Bombay Sappers & Miners – currently Bombay Engineer Group
- 4th Bombay Infantry – Later 1st Battalion, the Rajputana Rifles, currently, the 3rd Battalion, Brigade of the Guards 1 RAJ RIF
- 20th Bombay Infantry – currently 2nd Battalion, the Rajputana Rifles
- 23rd Bombay Infantry – currently 4th Battalion, the Rajputana Rifles
- 26th Bombay Infantry – later the 2nd Battalion, the 10th Baluch Regiment

=== Reshire ===
The honour was awarded to the units which participated in the attack on the old Dutch redoubt of Reshire on 7 December 1856. the Governor surrendered the fortifications on 8 December. The division then waited for the arrival of the C-in-C with the remainder of the army. The battle honour was awarded vide GOGG 1306 of 1858 to the following:

- 3rd Bombay Cavalry
- Bombay Sappers & Miners
- 4th Bombay Infantry
- 20th Bombay Infantry
- 26th Bombay Infantry

=== Bushire ===
The first division of the expedition disembarked in the neighbourhood of the city of Bushire on 5 December 1856. After a naval bombardment of the fortifications, Bushire was occupied unopposed. The honour was awarded by Bombay GO 191 of 1861, after India had passed under the Crown. Other honours for this campaign were awarded by the Company in 1858.

- Poona Horse
- Bombay Sappers & Miners
- 4th Bombay Infantry
- 20th Bombay Infantry
- 26th Bombay Infantry
- 3rd Regiment Local Contingent (disbanded)

=== Koosh-Ab ===
After the arrival of the C-in-C, the force advanced inland and defeated the Iranian field army at Koosh-Ab on 8 February 1857. The Poona Horse carries a Standard surmounted by a silver hand and bearing a Persian inscription captured at Koosh-Ab, in commemoration of the brilliant charge of the 3rd Bombay Light Cavalry which broke into enemy infantry and decided the fate of the day. The honour was awarded vide GOGG 1306 of 1858 and spelling changed from Kooshab vide Gazette of India No 1079 of 1910.

- 3rd Bombay Cavalry
- Poona Irregular Horse
- Bombay Sappers and Miners
- 4th Bombay Infantry
- 20th Bombay Infantry
- 26th Bombay Infantry
- 2nd Baluch Battalion – later the 4th Battalion, the 10th Baluch Regiment (Pakistan)

== See also ==
- British Indian Army
- East India Company
