= Battle of Khushab =

Major battle of the Anglo-Persian War

- Part of the Anglo-Persian War
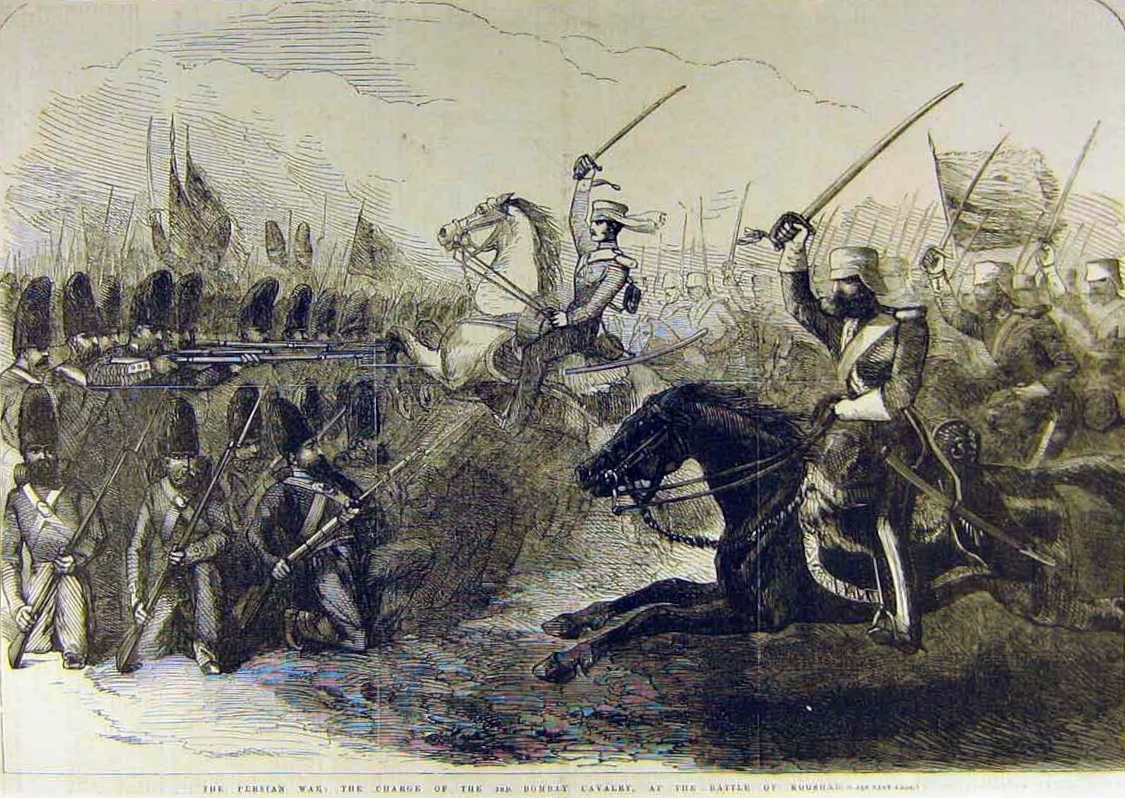
- British-Indian forces attacking at the Battle of Khushab
Date	7 February 1857
Location	Khushab, Qajar Iran
Result	British victory

Belligerents
(United Kingdom of Great Britain and Ireland) United Kingdom: East India Company	Qajar Iran

Commanders and leaders
(United Kingdom of Great Britain and Ireland) James Outram	Khanlar Mirza

Strength
4,600	8,000

The Battle of Khushab (Persian: جنگ خوشاب) took place in Khushab on 7 February 1857 and was the largest single engagement of the Anglo-Persian War. Having taken Borazjan without a fight, the British expeditionary army under Sir James Outram was withdrawing to Bushehr when it was ambushed by a smaller Persian force under Khanlar Mirza, drawn up in battle order to its rear. The battle ended with a British victory, whose troops returned to Bushehr.

The distinguishing action of the battle was the charge of the 3rd Bombay Light Cavalry (now amalgamated into The Poona Horse) against an infantry square of the 1st Khusgai Regiment of Fars, in which two Victoria Crosses were won. The recipients were the commander's adjutant Lieutenant Arthur Thomas Moore, who first broke into the square, and Captain John Grant Malcolmson, who then extricated Moore. Only twenty of the five hundred soldiers in the square escaped. Having beaten off the ambush, the British continued their withdrawal to Bushehr.

== Sources ==
- Mikaberidze, A. (2011). Conflict and Conquest in the Islamic World: A Historical Encyclopedia. ABC-CLIO. ISBN 978-1-59884-336-1.
- Tucker, Spencer C., ed. (2010). A Global Chronology of Conflict: From the Ancient World to the Modern Middle East. Vol. I. ABC-CLIO. ISBN 978-1851096671.
