= Ilkhani =

Ilkhani or Ilkhanid may refer to:

- Ilkhanate, a breakaway khanate of the Mongol Empire
- Zij-i Ilkhani, a Zij book with astronomical tables of planetary movements

== People ==
- Mohammad Ilkhani, Iranian philosopher
- Emam Gholi Khan Haji Ilkhani, the great ilkhan of Bakhtiari tribe

== Places in Iran ==
- Seyyedabad-e Ilkhani
- Jafarabad, Tabas (Deh-e Ilkhani)
- Mohammadabad-e Ilkhani
