= Sir James Outram, 1st Baronet =

British army officer (1803–1863)

Lieutenant-General Sir James Outram Bt GCB KSI
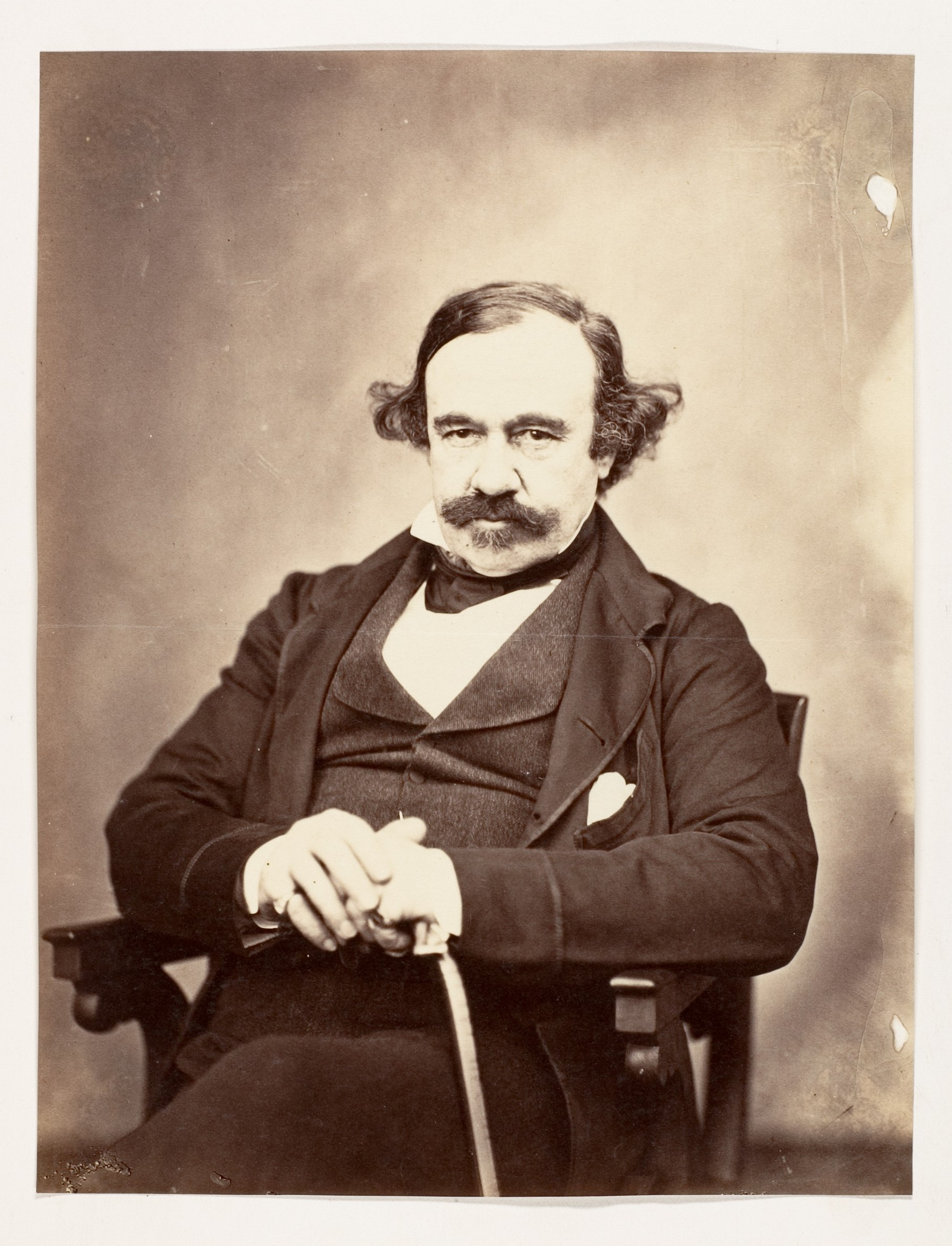
- Outram in c. 1858-61
- Born: 29 January 1803; Butterley, Derbyshire, England
- Died: 11 March 1863 (aged 60); Pau, Pyrenees-Atlantiques, France
- Burial place: Westminster Abbey
- Alma mater: Marischal College, University of Aberdeen
- Military career
- Allegiance: East India Company
- Branch: Bombay Army; Bengal Army
- Service years: 1819–1860
- Rank: Lieutenant-general
- Nickname: The Bayard of India
- Conflicts: First Anglo-Afghan War: Battle of Ghazni; Anglo-Persian War: Battle of Khushab; Indian Rebellion of 1857: Siege of Lucknow
- Awards: Knight Grand Cross of the Order of the Bath; Knight Companion of the Order of the Star of India
- Other work: Resident Minister of Lucknow; Chief Commissioner of Oudh

Lieutenant-General Sir James Outram, 1st Baronet (29 January 1803 – 11 March 1863) was a British army officer who served in the conquest of Sindh and Indian Rebellion of 1857.

== Early life ==
James Outram was the son of Benjamin Outram of Butterley Hall, Butterley, Derbyshire, a civil engineer, and Margaret Anderson, a daughter of James Anderson of Hermiston, a Scottish writer on agriculture. His father died in 1805, and his mother moved to Aberdeenshire in 1810. From Udny school the boy went in 1818 to the Marischal College, Aberdeen, and in 1819 an Indian cadetship was given to him. Soon after his arrival at Bombay his remarkable energy attracted notice, and in July 1820 he became acting adjutant to the first battalion of the 12th regiment on its embodiment at Poona, an experience which he found to be of immense advantage to him later in his career.

== Khandesh – 1825 ==
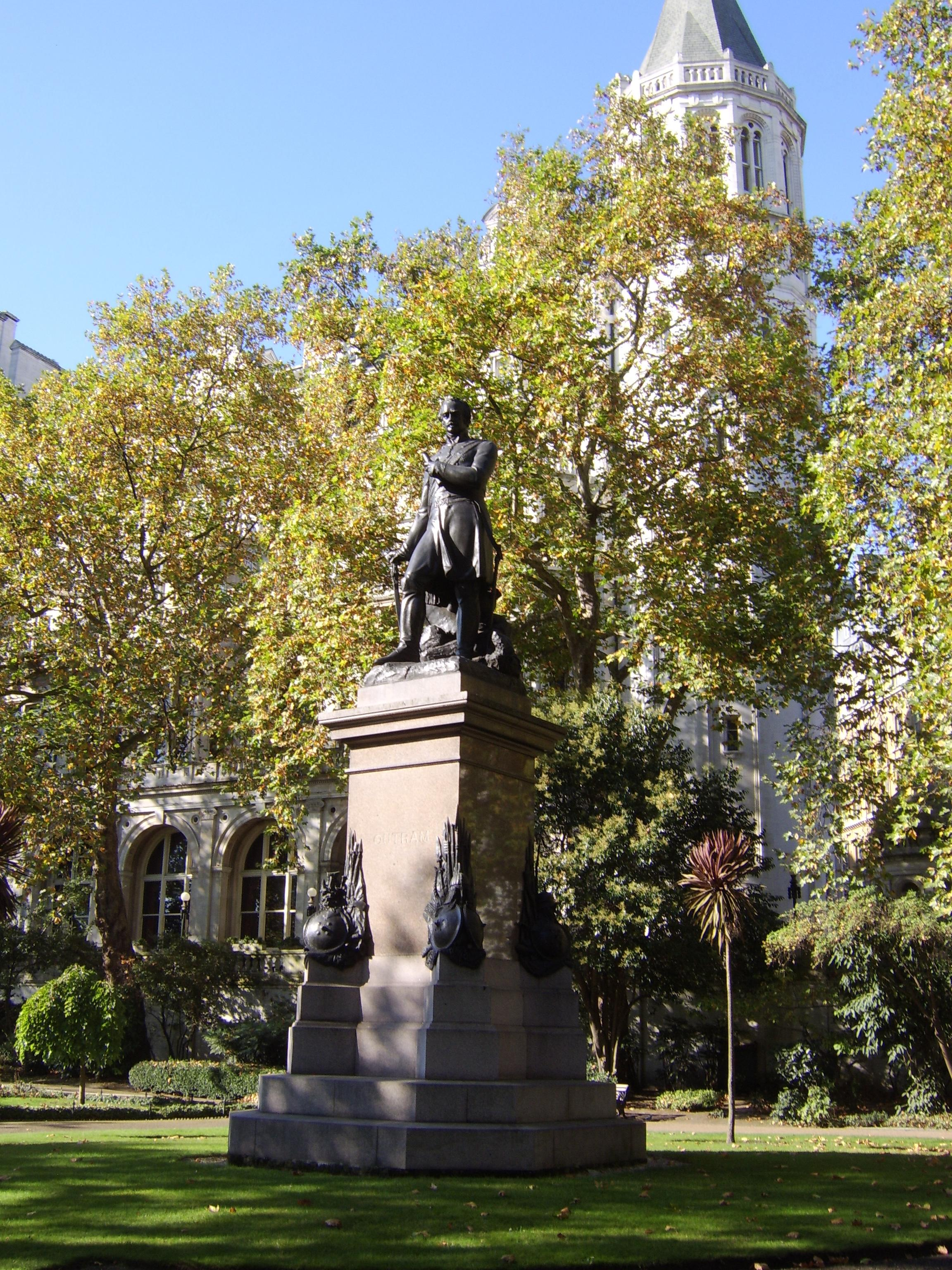
Statue of Sir James Outram by Matthew Noble, in Whitehall Gardens, London

In 1825, Outram was stationed in Khandesh to organize a light infantry corps composed of the Bhils, an indigenous tribe of the region's forested hills. He established significant authority within the community and utilized the corps to suppress local raiding and plundering. The Bhil's cooperation was largely sustained by their respect for his hunting skills, which involved considerable physical risk. Although Outram was physically frail and frequently ill during his early years in India, his health and physical strength improved over time, leading contemporaries to praise his strength.

== Gujarat and Sindh campaigns ==
In 1835 he was sent to Gujarat to make a report on the Mahi Kantha district, and for some time he remained there as political agent. On the outbreak of the First Afghan War in 1838 he was appointed extra aide-de-camp on the staff of Sir John Keane, and went to Afghanistan, where he conducted various raids against Afghan tribes and performed an extraordinary exploit in capturing a banner of the enemy before Ghazni. In 1839, he was promoted to major and appointed political agent in Lower Sindh, later being moved to Upper Sindh. While in Sindh, he strongly opposed the policy of his superior, Sir Charles Napier, which led to the annexation of Sindh into British India. However, when war broke out, he strategically defended the residency at Hyderabad against 8000 Baluchis irregulars, causing Sir Charles Napier to describe him as the "Bayard of India." On his return from a short visit to England in 1843, he was, with the rank of brevet lieutenant-colonel, appointed to a command in the Mahratta country, and in 1847 he was transferred from Satara to Baroda, where he incurred the resentment of the Bombay government by his fearless exposure of corruption.

== Lucknow – 1854 ==
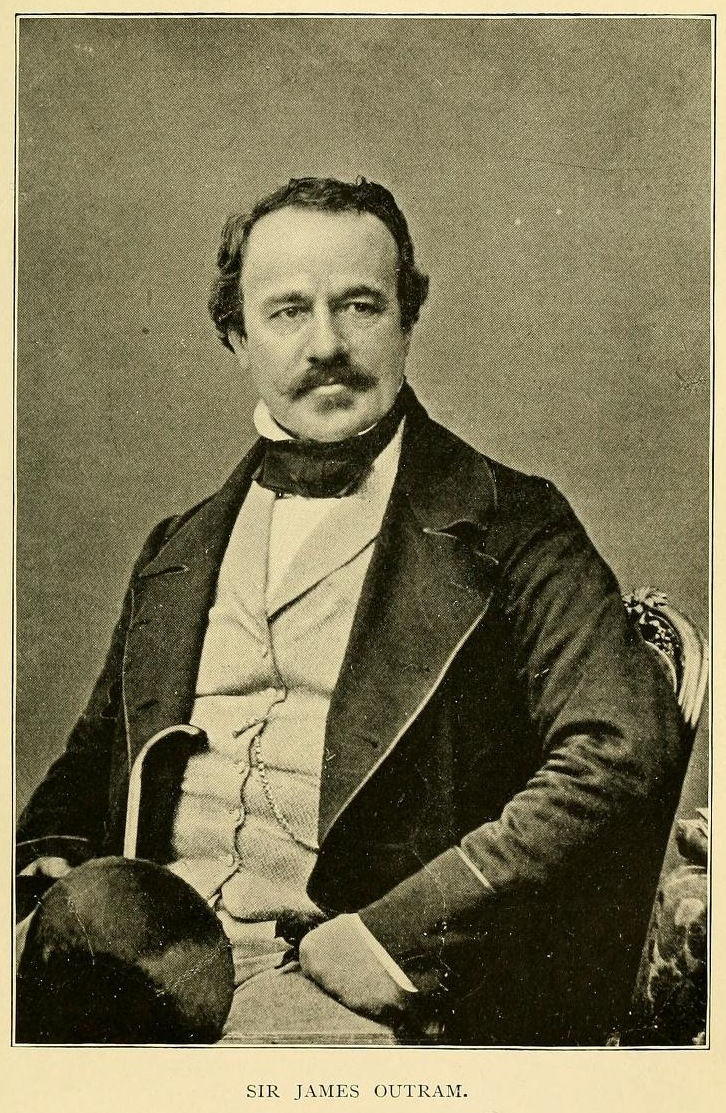

In 1854 he was appointed resident at Lucknow, in which capacity two years later he carried out the annexation of Oudh and became the first chief commissioner of that province. Appointed in 1857, with the rank of lieutenant-general, to command an expedition against Persia during the Anglo-Persian War, he defeated the Persian forces in February 1857 after an attempted ambush by their commander Khanlar Mirza at Khushab. Outram conducted the campaign with such rapid decision that peace was concluded by the Treaty of Paris in March 1857, his services being rewarded by the grand cross of the Bath. Later that year, the Governor-General's wife, Lady Canning was unimpressed with him when he stayed at Government House in August 1857: she recorded that ‘he is a very common looking little dark Jewish bearded man, with a desponding slow hesitating manner, very unlike descriptions — or rather the idea raised in one’s mind by the old Bombay name the "Bayard of the East" . . . He is not the least my idea of a hero.’

From Persia he was summoned in June to India, with the brief explanation "We want all our best men here". It was said of him at this time that a fox is a fool and a lion a coward by the side of Sir J. Outram. Immediately on his arrival in Calcutta he was appointed to command the two divisions of the Bengal army occupying the country from Calcutta to Cawnpore; and to the military control was also joined the commissionership of Oudh. Already hostilities had assumed such proportions as to compel Henry Havelock to fall back on Cawnpore, which he held only with difficulty, although a speedy advance was necessary to save the garrison at Lucknow. On arriving at Cawnpore with reinforcements, Outram, in admiration of the brilliant deeds of General Havelock, conceded to him the glory of relieving Lucknow, and, waiving his rank, tendered his services to him as a volunteer. During the advance he commanded a troop of volunteer cavalry, and performed exploits of great brilliancy at Mangalwar, and in the attack at the Alambagh; and in the final conflict he led the way, charging through a very tempest of fire. The volunteer cavalry unanimously voted him the Victoria Cross, but he refused the choice on the grounds that he was ineligible as the general under whom they served. Resuming supreme command, he then held the town until the arrival of Sir Colin Campbell, after which he conducted the evacuation of the residency so as completely to deceive the enemy. In the second capture of Lucknow, on the commander-in-chief's return, Outram was entrusted with the attack on the side of the Gomti, and afterwards, having recrossed the river, he advanced through the Chattar Manzil to take the residency, thus, in the words of Colin Campbell, putting the finishing stroke on the enemy. After the capture of Lucknow he was gazetted lieutenant-general. While in Lucknow he employed a code whereby letters were transliterated using the Greek alphabet, which was a common practice in the military at the time.

Major-General Francis Edward Archibald Chamier, CB, CIE, IMM**, (1833 - 1923) served as a Lieutenant where he was Aide-de-Camp and Persian interpreter to General Sir James Outram, 1st Baronet, during the Indian Mutiny where he took part in the relief of Lucknow in 1857.

== Thanks – Bayard of India ==
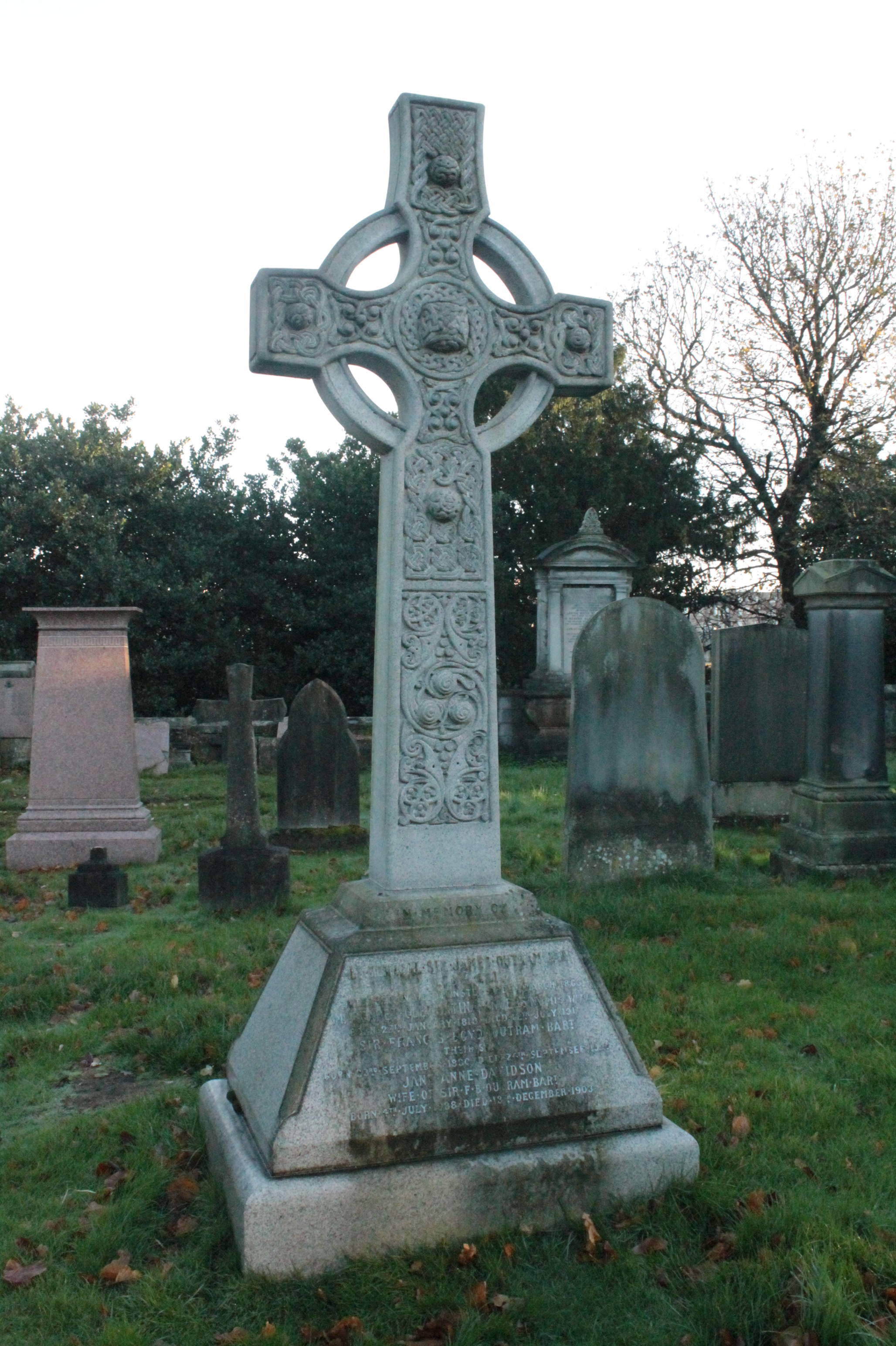
Memorial to Sir James Outram, Dean Cemetery

In February 1858, he received the special thanks of both houses of Parliament, and in the same year the dignity of baronet with an annuity of £1,000. When, on account of shattered health, he returned finally to England in 1860, a movement resulted in the presentation of a public testimonial, and the erection of statues in London (by sculptor Matthew Noble) and Calcutta.

He died at Pau in the south of France on 11 March 1863, and was buried on 25 March in the nave of Westminster Abbey, where the marble slab on his grave bears the poignant epitaph The Bayard of India.

== Family ==
He was married to Margaret Clementine Anderson (1813-1911). She is buried in Dean Cemetery in Edinburgh. The gravestone is also to the memory of Sir James. Their son Sir Francis Boyd Outram lies with her.

== Legacy ==
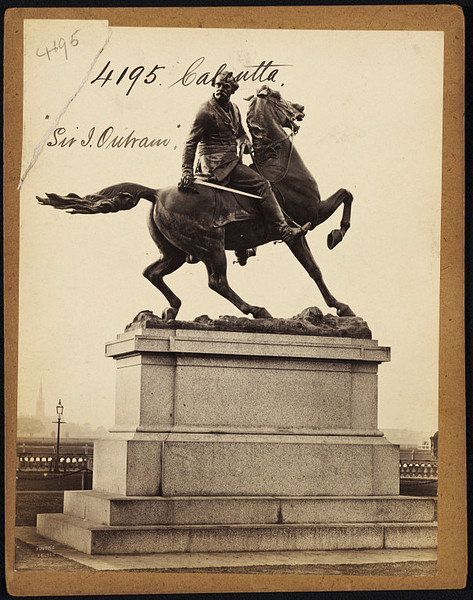
Statue of Sir James Outram at Maidan, now in garden of Victoria Memorial, Kolkata

A memorial to Outram was erected in Westminster Abbey in 1863 to the designs of Matthew Noble.

- Autram Ghat is in the Satmala Range in Khandesh, that connects Aurangabad and Chalisgaon in Maharashtra.
- Outram Street is a street near King's Park in Perth, Australia, named after Sir James Outram. Two other nearby streets (Colin Street and Havelock Street) are named in honour of Generals concerned in the Indian Mutiny.
- Jamesabad, Pakistan is a town in the Punjab province of Pakistan which was named after Sir James Outram during the British Raj.
- Outram, Singapore is an area of the city of Singapore named after Outram Road which was named in Sir James' honour in 1858. The nearby MRT station is Outram Park.
- Outram, New Zealand is a small town near Dunedin. It was named after Sir James by Sir John Richardson.
- Outram Road in Croydon, south London, is named after Outram. The road is near Addiscombe Military Seminary which trained officers for the East India Company.
- The Outram Ghat in Kolkata, West Bengal, India, has been named after General Outram.
- Outram Lines, Kingsway Camp, Delhi, India
- Outram Road in Southsea, Hampshire, United Kingdom is named for Sir James Outram.
- Outram Hall, named after Sir James Outram, is located across from the popular Murrays Bay beach on Auckland's North Shore in New Zealand.
- Outram Street, Ripley, Derbyshire, United Kingdom, is a street in the neighbouring Village to where Sir James Outram was born, named in 1861 to honour his legacy.

== Fictional portrayals ==
- General James Outrum appears as a character in Flashman in the Great Game by George MacDonald Fraser.
- Outram is played by Richard Attenborough in the 1977 Satyajit Ray film The Chess Players.
- In a 53-episode Indian TV historical drama Bharat Ek Khoj, John Holyer plays the role of Outram in episodes 42.,

== Works ==
- Outram, James (1840). Rough Notes on the Campaign in Sinde and Affganistan in 1838–39. Bombay: American Mission Press.
- Outram, James (1846). The Conquest of Scinde: A Commentary. Vol. Part 1: General Sir Charles Napier's Negotiations with the Amers. Edinburgh and London: William Blackwood and Sons.
- Outram, James (1846). The Conquest of Scinde: A Commentary. Vol. Part 2: Campaign in Scinde and treatment of the Amers. Edinburgh and London: William Blackwood and Sons.
- Outram, James (1853). A Memoir of the Public Services Rendered by Lieut. Colonel Outram, CB. London: Smith, Elder and Co.
- Outram, James (1853). A Few Brief Memoranda of Some of the Public Services Rendered by Lieut.-Colonel Outram, C.B. London: Smith, Elder and Co.
- Outram, James (1853). Baroda Intrigues and Bombay Khutput. London: Smith, Elder and Co.
- Outram, James (1860). Lieut.-General Sir James Outram's Persian Campaign in 1857. London: Smith, Elder and Co.
- Outram, James (1860). Lieut.-General Sir James Outram's campaign in India, 1857–1858. London: Smith, Elder and Co.

Baronetage of the United Kingdom
New creation	Baronet (of Bengal); 1858–1863	Succeeded by Francis Boyd Outram
