= Arthur Thomas Moore =

Recipient of the Victoria Cross

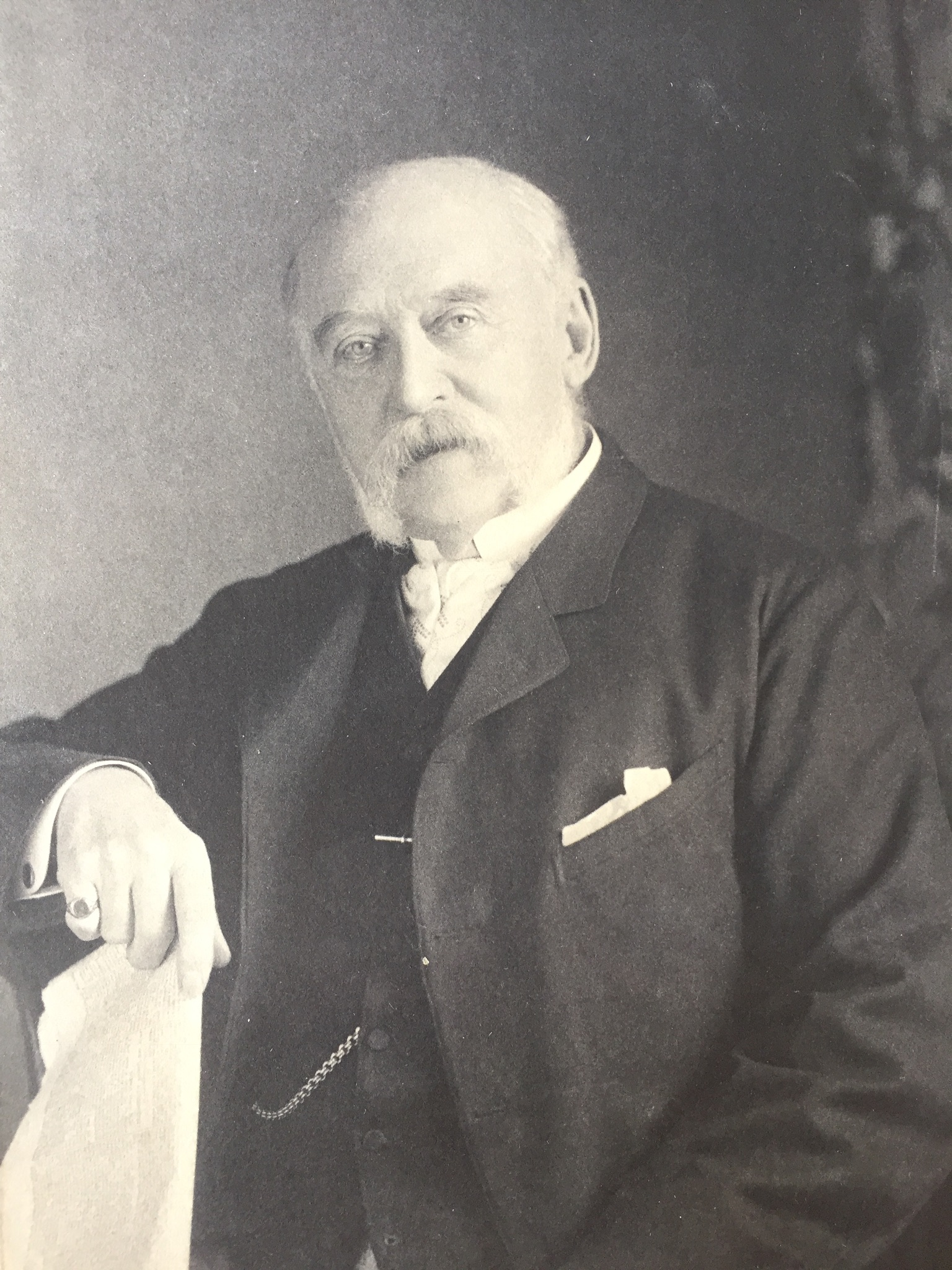
- Born: 20 September 1830; Carlingford, County Louth, Ireland
- Died: 25 April 1913 (aged 82); Dublin, Ireland
- Burial place: Mount Jerome Cemetery
- Military career
- Allegiance: United Kingdom
- Branch: Bombay Army
- Service years: 1850–1888
- Rank: Major general
- Units: 3rd Bombay Light Cavalry
- Conflicts: Anglo-Persian War; Indian Mutiny
- Awards: Victoria Cross; Companion of the Order of the Bath; Mentioned in Despatches (2)

Major General Arthur Thomas Moore, VC, CB (20 September 1830 – 25 April 1913) was a Bombay Army officer and an Irish recipient of the Victoria Cross, the highest award for gallantry in the face of the enemy that can be awarded to British and Commonwealth forces.

== Details ==
Moore was born in Carlingford, County Louth and educated at the East India Company College. He was 26 years old, and a lieutenant in the 3rd Bombay Light Cavalry, Indian Army during the Persian War when the following deed took place for which he and John Grant Malcolmson were awarded the VC.

On 8 February 1857 at the Battle of Khushab, Persia, Lieutenant Moore who was Adjutant of the Regiment, was probably the first in the attack, but his horse, on leaping into the square, fell dead, crushing his rider and breaking his sword. Lieutenant Moore extricated himself, but he would almost certainly have lost his life had not Lieutenant John Grant Malcolmson fought his way to his dismounted comrade and carried him to safety. In this battle Lieutenant Moore also charged an infantry square of 500 Persians at the head of his regiment and jumped his horse over the enemy's bayonets.

He later achieved the rank of major general. He died 8 Waterloo Place, Dublin, 25 April 1913 and is buried in Mount Jerome Cemetery.

== See also ==
- List of Persian War Victoria Cross recipients
