= Outram baronets =

Baronetcy in the Baronetage of the United Kingdom

The Outram of Bengal baronetcy is a title in the Baronetage of the United Kingdom. It was created on 10 November 1858 for General Sir James Outram. He was the son of the civil engineer Benjamin Outram. The family surname is pronounced "Ootram".

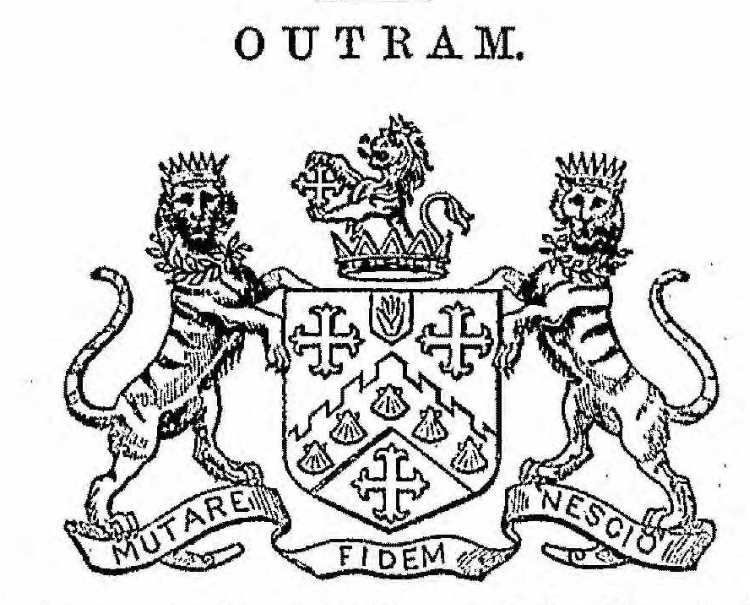
The coat of arms of the Outram baronetcy

== Outram baronets (1858) ==
Escutcheon of the Outram baronets

- Sir James Outram, GCB, KCSI, 1st Baronet (1803–1863)
- Sir Francis Boyd Outram, 2nd Baronet (1836–1912)
- Sir James Outram, 3rd Baronet (1864–1925)
- Sir Francis Davidson Outram, OBE, 4th Baronet (1867–1945)
- Sir Alan James Outram, 5th Baronet (born 1937)

The heir apparent to the baronetcy is Douglas Benjamin James Outram (born 1979), only son of the 5th Baronet.
