= John Malcolmson =

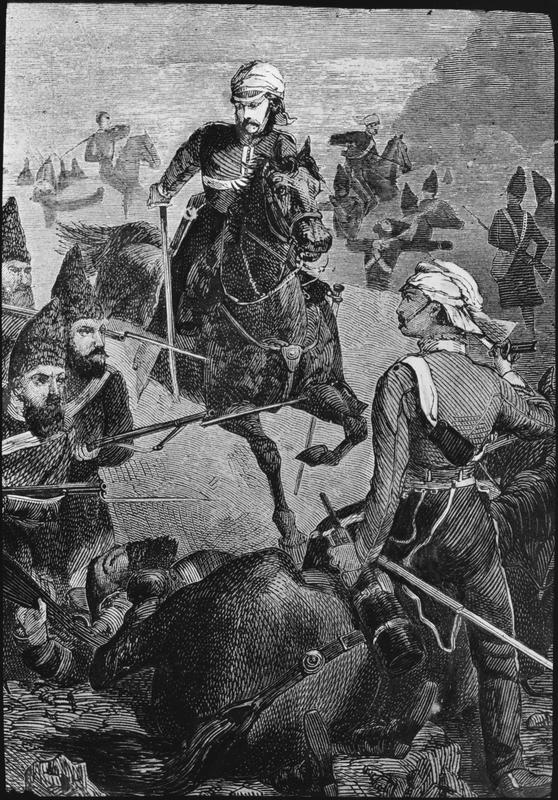
- Born: 9 February 1835; Inverness, Scotland
- Died: 14 August 1902 (aged 67); London, England
- Burial place: Kensal Green Cemetery
- Military career
- Allegiance: United Kingdom
- Branch: Bengal Army
- Rank: Captain
- Units: 3rd Bombay Light Cavalry
- Conflicts: Anglo-Persian War; Indian Mutiny
- Awards: Victoria Cross; Member of the Royal Victorian Order

John Grant Malcolmson, VC, MVO (9 February 1835 – 14 August 1902) was a Bengal Army officer and a Scottish recipient of the Victoria Cross, the highest award for gallantry in the face of the enemy that can be awarded to British and Commonwealth forces.

== Details ==
Malcolmson was 21 years old, and a lieutenant in the 3rd Bombay Light Cavalry, Indian Army during the Persian War when the following deed took place for which he and Arthur Thomas Moore were awarded the VC.

On 8 February 1857 at the Battle of Khushab, Persia, the adjutant of the regiment, Lieutenant Moore was probably the first in the attack, but his horse, on leaping into the square, fell dead, crushing his rider and breaking his sword. The adjutant extricated himself and tried with his broken sword to force his way through the enemy, but he would almost certainly have lost his life had not Lieutenant Malcolmson seen his plight, fought his way to his dismounted comrade and, giving him his stirrup, carried him to safety.

The following year, he took part in the Central Indian campaign of 1858 during the Indian Rebellion. He later achieved the rank of captain, and served in the Honourable Corps of Gentlemen at Arms.

Shortly before his death, he was invested as a Member (fourth class) of the Royal Victorian Order (MVO) by King Edward VII at Buckingham Palace on 11 August 1902 (the order was gazetted after his death).

He died, suddenly, at Bramham Gardens, London, on 14 August 1902. His Victoria Cross is held by the National Army Museum in Chelsea.

== See also ==
- List of Scottish Victoria Cross recipients
