= Outram Ghat =

Ghat of Kolkata, West Bengal, India

Religion
- Affiliation: Hinduism

Location
- Country: India
- Geographic coordinates: 22°33′51.809″N 88°20′16.769″E

Outram Ghat is a ghat built during British Raj, in Kolkata along the river bank of Hooghly, a distributary of the Ganges River.

It was built in late nineteenth century by British authorities in memory of Sir James Outram. During colonial era it used to be a key port and the main mooring for ships to East Bengal and Burma. Outram Ghat is located in the southern direction busy and bustling Babughat of Kolkata.
