= Mirza Mohammad Khan Sepahsalar =

Grand Vizier of Iran in 1865–1866

- محمد خان
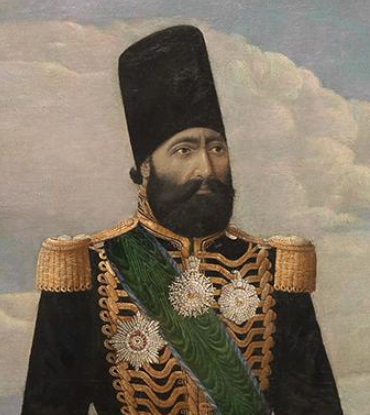

Grand vizier of Iran
- In office 23 March 1865 – 16 June 1866
- Monarch: Naser al-Din Shah Qajar
- Preceded by: Jafar Khan Moshir od-Dowleh→Vacant→
- Succeeded by: →Vacant→Mirza Yusuf Ashtiani

Minister of War
- In office September 1858 – 19 July 1866
- Monarch: Naser al-Din Shah Qajar
- Succeeded by: Aziz Khan Mokri

Personal details
- Died: c. 1867 Mashhad, Qajar Iran
- Children: Amir Mehdi Khan; Mohammad Nasr Khan; Hussein Khan
- Occupation: Politician

Military service
- Allegiance: Qajar Iran
- Rank: Commander-in-chief
- Battles/wars: Anglo-Persian War

Mirza Mohammad Khan Sepahsalar (Persian: میرزا محمدخان سپهسالار; died c. 1867) also known as Kashikchi Bashi and then Sepahsalar was the Grand vizier of Iran during the reign of Naser al-Din Shah Qajar (r. 1848–1896).

== Biography ==
Mirza Mohammad Khan, the son of Amir Khan Sardar, was a soldier during the reign of Mohammad Shah Qajar. He inherited the title of Kashikchi Bashi from his father. During the British military invasion of southern Iran, he was chosen to replace Mehr Ali Khan Shuja al-Mulk Nouri, commander of the southern forces, who had been defeated by the British, but could not do anything against him.

In 1863, he suppressed the Turkmens uprising in Astarabad and was appointed Minister of Defense as a reward. A year later, Naser al-Din Shah was appointed Minister of War, retaining the position of Minister of War. At his initiative, the first military manual in Iran was approved and implemented, based on the guidelines of the British and French armies. The program set out the method of appointing and dismissing command staff, scheduling compulsory military exercises, and establishing a trained reserve to introduce a specific organizational structure.

Prime Minister Mirza Mohammad Khan lasted 17 months and because he was a military man, he mainly paid attention to the troops and was oblivious to the affairs of the country. In addition, courtiers and ministers appointed by the Shah disregarded his orders, and were accountable only to the Shah. Eventually, he was ousted and exiled to Mashhad by the conspiracies of Mirza Yusuf Ashtiani and other courtiers.

After Mirza Yusuf Khan's death, Mirza Mohammad, along with a number of Naser al-Din Shah's opponents, conspired to overthrow him in favour of his brother Abdol-samad Mirza Ezz ed-Dowleh. Naser al-Din Shah realized this conspiracy and during a trip to Mashhad ordered the poisoning of Mirza Mohammad Khan with Qajar coffee. Mirza Mohammad Khan Sepahsalar died three days after Naser al-Din Shah returned to Tehran in 1867.

Mirza Mohammad Khan had sons named Amir Mehdi Khan, Mohammad Nasr Khan, and Hussein Khan.
