= Monikh =

Monikh منيخ
- Village
- Location within Iran
- Coordinates: 30°25′27″N 48°14′04″E
- Country: Iran
- Province: Khuzestan
- County: Khorramshahr
- Bakhsh: Central
- Rural District: Howmeh-ye Sharqi

Population (2006)
  - Total: 1,500
- Time zone: UTC+3:30 (IRST)
  - Summer (DST): UTC+4:30 (IRDT)

Monikh (Persian: منيخ, also Romanized as Monīkh, Monnīkh, and Munīkh) is a village in Howmeh-ye Sharqi Rural District, in the Central District of Khorramshahr County, Khuzestan Province, Iran. At the 2006 census, its population was 1,500, in 270 families.
