= Seyyedabad-e Ilkhani =

Seyyedabad-e Ilkhani سيدابادايلخاني
- Village
- Location within Iran
- Coordinates: 28°29′57″N 57°45′46″E
- Country: Iran
- Province: Kerman
- County: Anbarabad
- Bakhsh: Esmaili
- Rural District: Hoseynabad

Population (2006)
  - Total: 646
- Time zone: UTC+3:30 (IRST)
  - Summer (DST): UTC+4:30 (IRDT)

Seyyedabad-e Ilkhani (Persian: سيدابادايلخاني, also Romanized as Seyyedābād-e Īlkhānī; also known as Seyyedābād-e Īlkhānī Pūr) is a village in Hoseynabad Rural District, Esmaili District, Anbarabad County, Kerman Province, Iran. At the 2006 census, its population was 646, in 133 families.
