= Mohammadabad-e Ilkhani =

Mohammadabad-e Ilkhani محمدابادايلخاني
- Village
- Location within Iran
- Coordinates: 36°29′09″N 59°27′50″E
- Country: Iran
- Province: Razavi Khorasan
- County: Mashhad
- Bakhsh: Central
- Rural District: Tus

Population (2006)
  - Total: 595
- Time zone: UTC+3:30 (IRST)
  - Summer (DST): UTC+4:30 (IRDT)

Mohammadabad-e Ilkhani (Persian: محمدابادايلخاني, also Romanized as Moḩammadābād-e Īlkhānī; also known as Moḩammadābād-e Qods (Persian: محمداباد قدس) and Moḩammadābād) is a village in Tus Rural District, in the Central District of Mashhad County, Razavi Khorasan Province, Iran. At the 2006 census, its population was 595, in 143 families.
