= Khvosh Ab, Bushehr =

Village in Bushehr province, Iran

Khvosh Ab Persian: خوشاب
- Village
- Location within Iran
- Coordinates: 29°13′38″N 51°07′10″E
- Country: Iran
- Province: Bushehr
- County: Dashtestan
- District: Central
- Rural District: Howmeh

Population (2016)
  - Total: 914
- Time zone: UTC+3:30 (IRST)

Khvosh Ab (Persian: خوشاب) (Note: Also romanized as Khosh Āb, Khowsh Ab, Khūsh Āb, and Khvosh Āb; also known as Khāshāb) is a village in Howmeh Rural District (Note: Formerly Khvosh Makan Rural District) of the Central District in Dashtestan County, Bushehr province, Iran.

== Demographics ==
=== Population ===
At the time of the 2006 National Census, the village's population was 648 in 150 households. The following census in 2011 counted 726 people in 200 households. The 2016 census measured the population of the village as 914 people in 250 households.
