= Khanlar Mirza =

Iranian prince (d. 1862)

- Ehtesham ed-Dowleh
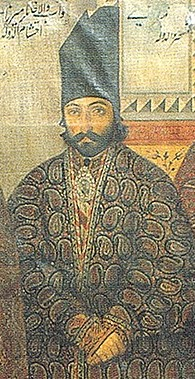
- Illustration of Khanlar Mirza, from the Nezamiyeh Hall in the Golestan Palace, Tehran
- Died: April 1862; Tehran, Iran
- Dynasty: Qajar
- Father: Abbas Mirza
- Religion: Twelver Shia Islam
- Military career
- Conflicts: Anglo-Persian war of 1856–1857

Khanlar Mirza Ehtesham-ed-Dowleh (Persian: خانلر میرزا; died April 1862), titled Ehtesham ed-Dowleh (Persian: احتشام الدوله), was a Qajar prince who held the governorship of several Iranian provinces during the reigns of Mohammad Shah Qajar (r. 1834–1848) and Naser al-Din Shah Qajar (r. 1848–1896). He was the seventeenth son of Abbas Mirza.

== Biography ==
A member of the Qajar dynasty, Khanlar Mirza was the seventeenth son of Abbas Mirza. He was given the governorship of Yazd in 1835, most likely at the suggestion of the newly appointed premier Haji Mirza Aqasi. But in less than two years, Khanlar Mirza was sent from Yazd to Kerman and Sistan, where he put down an uprising by the Baloch people. While his uncle Bahman Mirza Baha od-Dowleh was governing Yazd, a revolt was staged by Aga Khan I, the Imam of the Nizari Isma'ilis. Without any permission, Khanlar Mirza then went to Yazd to take Kerman from Bahman Mirza. Their clash infuriated Mohammad Shah, but Aqasi stepped in to defend Khanlar Mirza.

From 1841 to the middle of 1848, Khanlar Mirza served as the governor of Hamadan. Following several months in office as the governor of the Mazandaran province, Khanlar Mirza was dispatched to the southwest to resolve the matters of Borujerd and Bakhtiari. In early 1851, his responsibilities were expanded to include the administration of the Arabestan and Lorestan provinces. Most of the bandits in that region were driven out by him during that time. It was also through his efforts that the lengthy and expensive Hashem dam was finally constructed. It spanned the Hashem river, an artificial tributary of the Karkheh river.

His subpar leadership of a substantial Iranian army at the battle of Mohammerah during the Anglo-Persian war of 1856–1857, however, eclipsed these accomplishments. Many of Khanlar Mirza's officers subsequently received harsh punishment from the central government, while he reportedly had to pay a large indemnity. The governorship of Isfahan was the final post held by Khanlar Mirza. He died in April 1862 in the capital of Tehran, where he had traveled to inform Naser al-Din Shah of the situation in Isfahan.

== Sources ==
- Algar, Hamid (1986). "Āqā Khan". In Yarshater, Ehsan (ed.). Encyclopædia Iranica. Vol. II/3: ʿArab Moḥammad–Architecture IV. London and New York: Routledge & Kegan Paul. pp. 170–175. ISBN 978-0-71009-103-1.
- Eslami, Kambiz (2020). "Eḥtešām-al-Dawla, Ḵānlar Khan". In Yarshater, Ehsan (ed.). Encyclopædia Iranica (Online ed.). Encyclopædia Iranica Foundation.
