= 26th Jacob's Mountain Battery =

- Active: 1826 – Present
- Country: (United Kingdom) British India (1826–1947); Pakistan (1947 – Present)
- Branch: (British Raj) British Indian Army; Pakistan Army
- Size: Battery
- Part of: Pakistan Army Artillery Corps
- Uniform: Blue; faced red
- Engagements: Second Afghan War 1878–80; Pacification of Upper Burma 1889–93; First World War (Egypt, Gallipoli, Mesopotamia, Persia) 1914–18; Second World War (Burma) 1939–45; Kashmir War 1948; Indo-Pakistan War 1965; Indo-Pakistan War 1971

The 26th Jacob's Mountain Battery was an artillery unit of the British Indian Army. The battery can trace its origins back to Golandauze Battalion (1826). In 1843 it became the 10th Company Golandauze Battalion of Bombay Foot Artillery, and became the 26th Jacob's Mountain Battery in 1903. In 1947, it was transferred to the Pakistan Army, where it exists as the 1st Jacob's Battery (Baloch) of The First (SP) Medium Regiment Artillery (Frontier Force).

== History ==
The battery was raised in 1826 and renamed as the 10th Company Golandauze Battalion Bombay Foot Artillery in 1843. The Golandauze Battalion was the first native artillery unit of the Bombay Army. The gunners were dressed in blue uniforms with red facings. The manpower consisted of Muslims, Marathas and Purbeeas. In 1846, the Golandauze Battalion was split into two, and the battery was re-designated as the 3rd Company 4th Battalion Bombay Foot Artillery. During the Great Indian Rebellion of 1857, the battery mutinied at Shikarpur and was disbanded. In 1862, it was re-raised and in 1864, it was re-designated as No. 2 Company Bombay Native Artillery. Meanwhile, in 1858, General John Jacob raised a unit of mountain artillery in Jacobabad, Sindh, called the Jacobabad Mountain Train for service on the Sindh frontier. The Jacobabad Mountain Train was manned by men of Jacob's Rifles. In 1876, the guns of Jacobabad Mountain Train were taken over by No. 2 Company Bombay Native Artillery, which was re-designated as the No. 2 Bombay Mountain Battery.

The Jacob's Battery saw service on the Northwest Frontier of India and fought in the Second Afghan War of 1878–80. It also took part in the Lushai Expedition of 1889 and served in Burma from 1889 to 1893 where it took part in operations against the Shans and Kachins. In 1890, the battery was designated as No. 6 (Bombay) Mountain Battery, becoming Jullundur Mountain Battery in 1901 and 26th Jacob's Mountain Battery in 1903.

During the First World War, the 26th Jacob's Mountain Battery fought with great distinction at Gallipoli, Egypt, Mesopotamia and Persia. After the war, it again saw service on the Northwest Frontier. During the Second World War, it fought in the Burma Campaign as part of the 17th Indian Division. In 1944, it became an exclusively Punjabi Muslim unit. In 1947, it was transferred to the Pakistan Army, where it became the senior battery of 1 Mountain Regiment, Royal Pakistan Artillery. The battery fought in the Kashmir War of 1948.

In 1954, Jacob's Battery was affiliated with the Baluch Regiment due to its old links and common origins with the Jacob's Rifles. In 1957, the battery was equipped with 105 mm Self Propelled Field guns and the 1st Mountain Regiment was re-designated as the 1 (SP) Field Regiment, Artillery. The regiment fought gallantly in the Battle of Chawinda during the Indo-Pakistani War of 1965. In the Indo-Pakistani War of 1971, the regiment served in the Zafarwal Sector. In 1980, it was re-equipped with M109A2 self-propelled medium guns.

== Battle honours ==
Afghanistan 1878–80, Suez Canal, Egypt 1915–16, Mesopotamia 1916–18, Persia 1918, Anzac, Landing at Anzac, Defence of Anzac, Suvla, Sari Bair, Gallipoli 1915.

== Genealogy ==
- 1843 – 10th Company Golandauze Battalion Bombay Foot Artillery
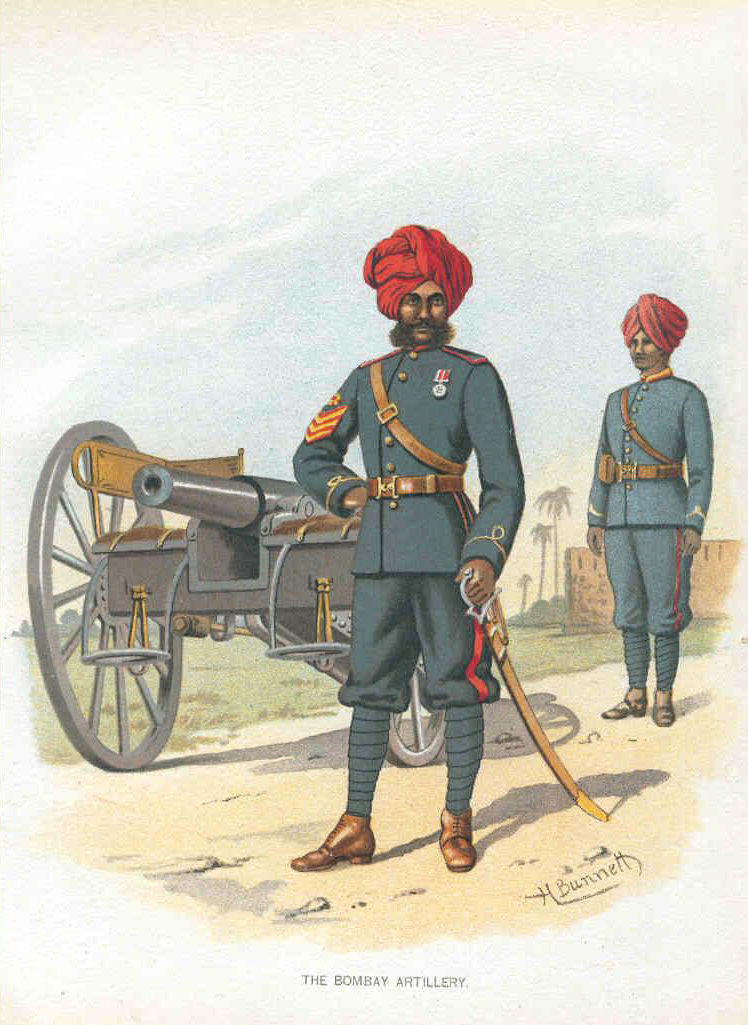
  The Bombay Artillery. Chromolithograph by H Bunnett, c. 1890.
- 1846 – 3rd Company 4th Battalion Bombay Foot Artillery
- 1857 – Mutinied at Shikarpur and disbanded
- 1862 – Re-raised
- 1864 – No. 2 Company Bombay Native Artillery
- 1876 – No. 2 Mountain Battery, Bombay Artillery (amalgamation of No. 2 Company Bombay Native Artillery & Jacobabad Mountain Train – raised 1858)
- 1876 – No. 2 Bombay Mountain Battery
- 1890 – No. 6 (Bombay) Mountain Battery
- 1901 – Jullundur Mountain Battery
- 1903 – 26th Jacob's Mountain Battery
- 1920 – 26th Jacob's Pack Battery
- 1921 – 106th (Jacob's) Pack Battery
- 1922 – 106th (Jacob's) Pack Battery (How)
- 1924 – 106th (Jacob's) Pack Battery, Royal Artillery (How)
- 1927 – 6th (Jacob's) Indian Mountain Battery, Royal Artillery (How)
- 1928 – 6th (Jacob's) Mountain Battery, Royal Artillery (How)
- 1939 – 6th (Jacob's) Mountain Battery, Indian Artillery
- 1942 – 6th (Jacob's) Indian Mountain Battery, Indian Artillery
- 1945 – 6th (Jacob's) Indian Mountain Battery, Royal Indian Artillery
- 1947 – 1st (Jacob's) Mountain Battery, Royal Pakistan Artillery
- 1954 – 1st (Jacob's) Mountain Battery, Royal Pakistan Artillery (Baluch)
- 1956 – 1st (Jacob's) Mountain Battery, Artillery (Baluch)
- 1957 – 1st Jacob's (SP) Field Battery, Artillery (Baluch)
- 1980 – 1st Jacob's (SP) Medium Battery, Artillery (Baluch)
- 1991 – 1st Jacob's (SP) Medium Battery, Artillery (Baloch)

== Affiliations and alliances ==
- (Pakistan) The Baloch Regiment
