= Baloch Regiment =

Infantry regiment of the Pakistan Army

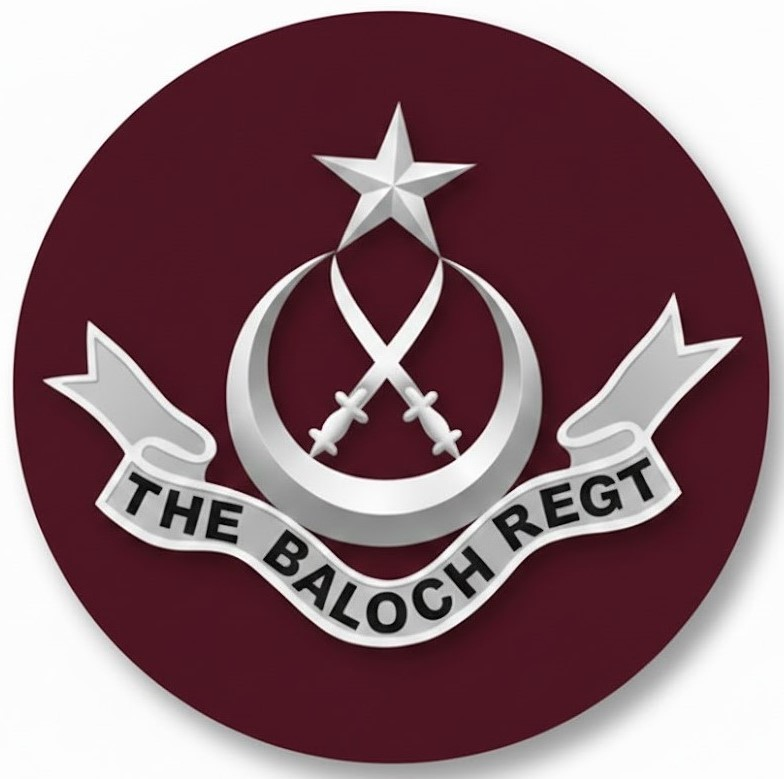
- Founded: 1798
- Country: Company Rule 1798–1858; British India 1858–1947; Pakistan 1947–present
- Branch: British Indian Army; Pakistan Army
- Role: Infantry
- Size: 62 battalions
- Regimental centre: Abbottabad
- Mottos: Ghazi ya Shaheed (Victorious or Martyr)
- War cry: Kai Kai
- Uniform: Rifle Green; faced cherry
- Engagements: Second Polygar War; Second Maratha War; Travancore War; Third Maratha War; Third Kandy War; First Burma War; Naning War; Coorg War; Expedition to Aden; Second Sikh War; Second Burma War; Anglo-Persian War; Great Indian Rebellion; Taiping Rebellion; Abyssinian Campaign; Second Anglo-Afghan War; Rampa Rebellion; Anglo-Egyptian War; Third Burma War; Pacification of Upper Burma; Manipur Expedition; British East Africa 1896; British East Africa 1897–99; Boxer Rebellion; British Somaliland; First World War; France & Flanders; Egypt; Palestine; Gallipoli; Mesopotamia; Persia; Aden; German East Africa; Salonika; Russia; Third Anglo-Afghan War; Iraqi Revolt; Burmese Rebellion; Second World War; Italian East Africa; North Africa; Sicily; Italy; Greece; Iran; Iraq; Burma; Malaya; French Indochina; Dutch East Indies; Indo-Pakistani War of 1947 (Kashmir War); Indo-Pakistan War of 1965; Indo-Pakistan War of 1971; Defence of Kamalpur; Siachen Conflict; Kargil War; Insurgency in Balochistan; Insurgency in Khyber Pakhtunkhwa

Commanders
- Colonel Commandant: Lt General Muhammad Asim Malik, HI (M)

The Baloch Regiment is an infantry regiment of the Pakistan Army. The modern regiment was formed in May 1956 by the merger of 8th Punjab and Bahawalpur Regiments with the Baluch Regiment. Since then, further raisings have brought the strength of the Regiment to 62 battalions. Before 1991, it was called the Baluch Regiment but the spelling was changed to 'Baloch' to better reflect the correct pronunciation.

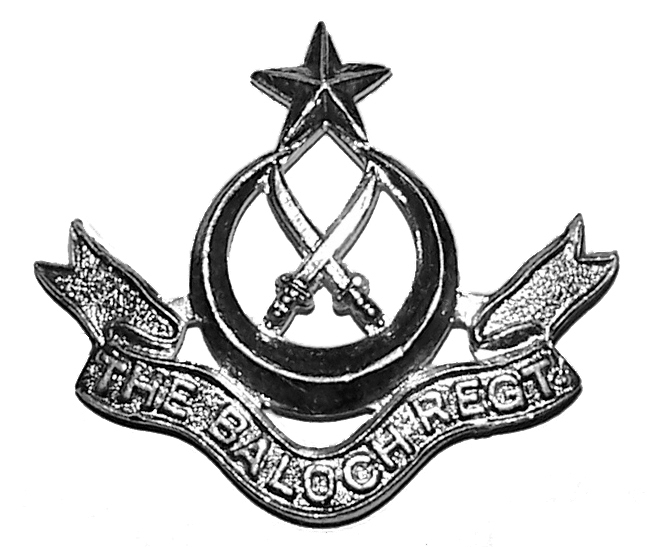
Regimental cap badge

The Baloch Regiment is second in seniority after the Punjab Regiment among the infantry regiments of Pakistan Army. Its senior-most battalion was raised more than two hundred years ago, in 1798. The regiment has a distinguished record of military service both before and after the independence of Pakistan. It has won numerous gallantry awards including 6 Victoria Cross, one George Cross, 6 Hilal-i-Jurat with one bar, 68 Sitara-i-Jurat with 4 bars, and 81 Tamgha-i-Jurat. The regiment's long list of battle honours dates from the Battle of Cochin in 1809 to the Battle of Qaisar-i-Hind in 1971.

== Early history of the Baloch Regiment ==
The Baloch Regiment has its origin in the former Bombay and Madras Armies, as well as the State Forces of Bahawalpur.

=== The Madras Army ===
In the 18th century, British possessions in India were divided into the 'Presidencies' of Madras, Bengal and Bombay. Each presidency maintained its own army, and it was not until the end of the 19th century that a unified command was established for the British Indian Army. For more than fifty years, the Madras Army was engaged in the struggle for control of South India and was largely responsible for the British defeat of Tipu Sultan and the French. It also took an active part in the wars against the Marathas, dispatched a number of overseas expeditions and played a major role in the conquest and pacification of Burma. The Baloch Regiment's Madrassi origins are derived from the five battalions it inherited from the 8th Punjab Regiment in 1956. The 1st Battalion was raised in 1798 at Masulipatam, as 3rd Extra Battalion of Madras Native Infantry, and was known as MacLeod ki Paltan (MacLeod's Battalion) after the officer who raised it. It was designated as the 1st Battalion 15th Regiment in 1800, and 29th Regiment of Madras Native Infantry in 1824. The battalion was dispatched to Ceylon to suppress a rebellion of the Sinhalese in 1818. In 1832, it was stationed at Malacca, Malaya, when it was again engaged in suppressing a revolt in the State of Naning. 2, 3, 4 & 5 Baloch were also raised as battalions of Madras Infantry in 1799–1800. In 1824, they were designated as the 30th, 31st, 32nd & 33rd Madras Native Infantry respectively. The 30th & 32nd Regiments took part in the First Burma War, while the 30th, 31st & 33rd fought in the Third Anglo-Maratha War of 1817. The 31st Regiment, then known as 1st Battalion 16th Regiment (or Trichinopoly Light Infantry), greatly distinguished itself at the Battle of Mahidpur. It was styled as Light Infantry in 1811, as a reward for a 25-mile forced march in support of a retreating force; when it arrived just in time to turn the tables in a minor engagement near Mysore. The 33rd Regiment first made its name in the Travancore War in 1809, when the battalion repulsed a force of 3000 rebels at Cochin. All four battalions saw considerable action in Central India against the Marathas during the Great Indian Rebellion of 1857-58.

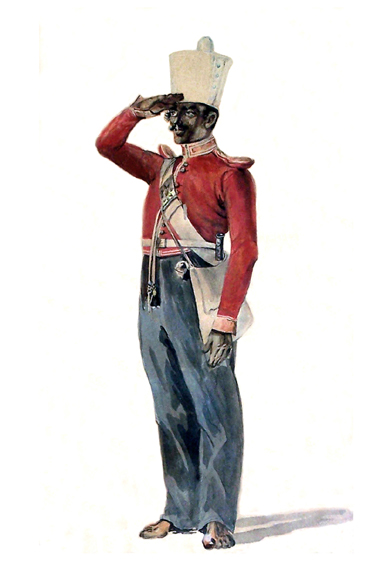
29th Madras Native Infantry (1 Baloch). Watercolour by Alex Hunter, 1846.

Between 1890 and 1893, the five battalions were moved to Burma and reconstituted with Punjabi Muslims, Sikhs and other North Indians. Their designations were changed to 29th (7th Burma Battalion), 30th (5th Burma Battalion), 31st (6th Burma Battalion), 32nd (4th Burma Battalion) and 33rd (3rd Burma Battalion) Regiments of Madras Infantry. In 1901, these cumbersome titles were simplified by removing all mention of Madras, and the five regiments were styled as the 29th and 30th Burma Infantry, 31st Burma Light Infantry, 32nd and 33rd Burma Infantry. These Burma Battalions were created to police the new territories acquired in the Third Burma War and pacify the rebellious hill tribes inhabiting the frontier regions of Burma. In 1903, all Madras regiments had sixty added to their numbers, requiring another change in designation to 89th and 90th Punjabis, 91st Punjabis (Light Infantry), 92nd Punjabis and 93rd Burma Infantry. After the First World War, the five Burma Battalions were grouped together to form the 8th Punjab Regiment in 1922. These frontier battalions had adopted uniforms of drab colour (a pinkish shade of khaki) when they moved to Burma and the 8th Punjab Regiment retained drab as its regimental colour with blue facings.

=== The Bombay Army ===
The senior battalion of what became the 10th Baluch Regiment in 1922, was raised in 1820, as the 2nd (Marine) Battalion 12th Regiment of Bombay Native Infantry. In 1838, as the 24th Regiment of Bombay Native Infantry, it stormed and captured the city of Aden (Yemen) as part of a punitive expedition sent to rid the area of pirates. The 26th Bombay Native Infantry was raised in 1825, as the 2nd Extra Battalion of Bombay Native Infantry, changing its name a year later. In 1843, the British conquered Sindh after defeating the ruling confederacy of Baloch chieftains. General Sir Charles Napier, the British commander, was much impressed by the ferocious courage of his Balochi opponents and decided to recruit them for local service within Sindh. As a result, two irregular battalions of Bombay Army, the 1st and 2nd Belooch (old spelling of Baloch) Battalions were raised in 1844 and 1846 at Karachi. In 1856, the 2nd Belooch Battalion was dispatched to fight in the Persian War in 1856–57, a campaign frequently overshadowed by the events of the Great Indian Rebellion of 1857. Meanwhile, the 1st Belooch Battalion was dispatched on foot across the Sindh desert in May, to join the siege artillery train on its way to Delhi; the only Bombay unit to join the Delhi Field Force. The battalion was brought into line in 1861, for its services in North India and it became the 27th Regiment of Bombay Native Infantry in the post-Mutiny realignment. 2nd Belooch, in the meantime, had qualified for a similar change in status and became the 29th Regiment of Bombay Native Infantry.

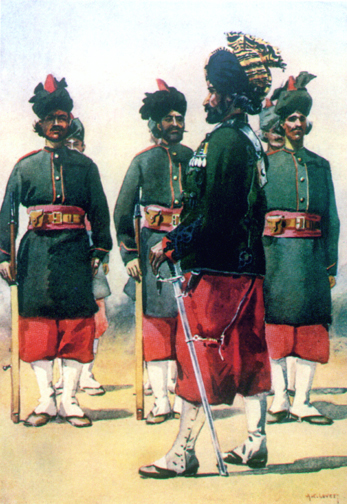
127th Queen Mary's Own Baluch Light Infantry (10 Baloch). Watercolour by AC Lovett, c. 1910.

In 1858, Major John Jacob raised two local 'silladar' infantry battalions known as Jacob's Rifles; the only silladar infantry to have existed in the Indian Army. These battalions soon earned a formidable reputation in and around Jacobabad for keeping the peace on the Sindh frontier. In 1861, the first of these was accorded regular status, becoming the 30th Regiment of Bombay Native Infantry or Jacob's Rifles, while the second was disbanded. In 1862, the 2nd Beloochees went to China to suppress the Taiping Rebellion. Two years later, they became the first foreign troops to be stationed in Japan, when two companies were sent to Yokohama to guard the British legation. Meanwhile, the 1st Beloochees greatly distinguished themselves in the long and arduous Abyssinian Campaign of 1868 and were made Light Infantry as a reward. All Baloch battalions took part in the Second Afghan War of 1878–80, where Jacob's Rifles suffered heavy casualties at the Battle of Maiwand. The 1st Belooch Regiment again distinguished itself in 1885–87 during the Third Burma War. In 1891, the 24th and 26th Bombay Infantry also became 'Balochi', when they were reconstituted with Pathans, Balochis and Hazaras, and localized in Baluchistan; becoming the 24th and 26th (Baluchistan) Regiments of Bombay Infantry. The 24th and 27th Regiments saw active service in British East Africa in 1896–99, while the 26th and Jacob's Rifles went to China in 1900 to suppress the Boxer Rebellion.

In 1903, the 24th, 26th, 27th, 29th, and 30th had one hundred added to their numbers as part of Lord Kitchener's reforms, emerging as the 124th Duchess of Connaught's Own Baluchistan Infantry, 126th Baluchistan Infantry, 127th Baluch Light Infantry, 129th Duke of Connaught's Own Baluchis and 130th Jacob's Baluchis. Following World War I, the five battalions were merged to form the 10th Baluch Regiment.

The pre-1914 full dress uniforms of all five Baluchi infantry regiments included dark red trousers; with rifle green tunics and dark green turbans for the 127th, 129th and 130th Baluchis. The 124th and 126th Baluchistan Infantry also wore red trousers but with drab-coloured tunics and turbans. On the formation of the 10th Baluch Regiment, rifle green and red uniform was adopted by the whole regiment. The 1911 edition of the Encyclopædia Britannica commented that "The remarkable Baluchi uniforms (green and drab with baggy red trousers) are unique in the British Empire".

=== The Bahawalpur State Forces ===
The two senior battalions of Bahawalpur Regiment trace their origin to 1827 when the Nawab of Bahawalpur first organized his forces. These forces were engaged in support of the British during the Second Anglo-Sikh War in 1848–49 and the Great Rebellion of 1857. In 1889, a small force from Bahawalpur was accepted as Imperial Service Troops, placing them at the disposal of the British for use in emergencies. However, it was not until the 20th century that these units began training on modern lines. In 1901, Bahawalpur State raised a camel baggage train with an escort of mounted infantry, called the Bahawalpur Imperial Service Mounted Rifles and Camel Transport Corps, which would go on to become the 1st Bahawalpur Sadiq Battalion in 1924. In 1912, the colour of their uniform was khaki with green facings.

== Baloch Regiment in the First World War ==
=== 10th Baluch Regiment ===
- 124th Duchess of Connaught's Own Baluchistan Infantry – British India, Persia.
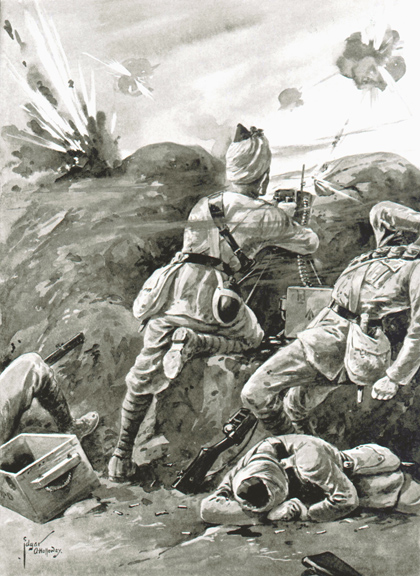
  Sepoy Khudadad Khan, VC, 129th DCO Baluchis (11 Baloch), Hollebeke Sector, First Battle of Ypres, 31 October 1914.
- 2/124th Duchess of Connaught's Own Baluchistan Infantry – Raised in 1916 – Mesopotamia, Egypt, Palestine.
- 3/124th Duchess of Connaught's Own Baluchistan Infantry – Raised in 1917 – India, Persia, Iraq. Disbanded 1921.
- 126th Baluchistan Infantry – India, Egypt, Muscat, Aden, Mesopotamia.
- 127th Queen Mary's Own Baluch Light Infantry – India, German East Africa, Persia.
- 2/127th Queen Mary's Own Baluch Light Infantry – Raised in 1918 – India, Egypt, Palestine. Disbanded 1921.
- 129th Duke of Connaught's Own Baluchis – India, France, German East Africa.
- 2/129th Duke of Connaught's Own Baluchis – Raised in 1917 – British India, Iraq. Disbanded 1922.
- 130th King George's Own Baluchis (Jacob's Rifles) – India, German East Africa, Palestine.
- 2/130th King George's Own Baluchis (Jacob's Rifles) – Raised in 1918 – India. Disbanded 1920.

Only 2/124th Baluchistan Infantry of the wartime raisings was retained after the post-war reforms.

During the First World War, the 129th DCO Baluchis served on the Western Front in France and Belgium, where they became the first Indian regiment to attack the Germans and the only Indian regiment to fight in both the First & Second Battles of Ypres. At Hollebeke, during the First Ypres, Sepoy Khudadad Khan became the first Indian to win the Victoria Cross; Britain's highest decoration for valour. Prior to 1911, Indian soldiers were not eligible for the Victoria Cross. The battalion would go on to serve with distinction in German East Africa alongside 127th QMO Baluch Light Infantry and 130th KGO Baluchis. Meanwhile, the 1st and 3rd Battalions of 124th DCO Baluchistan Infantry served in Persia, while the 2nd distinguished itself in Mesopotamia and Palestine.

=== 8th Punjab Regiment ===
- 89th Punjabis – British India, Aden, Egypt, Gallipoli, France, Mesopotamia, Salonika, Russia.
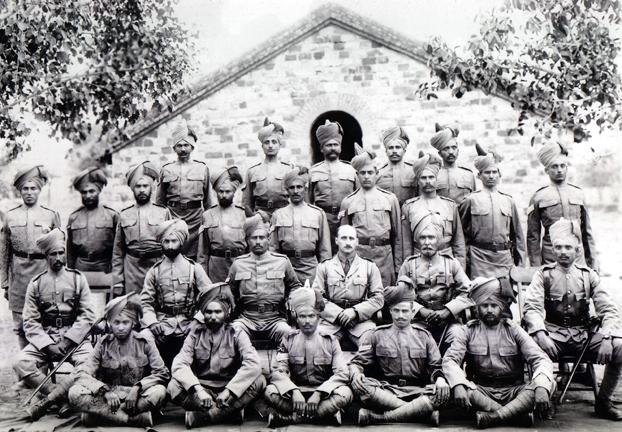
  1st Battalion 89th Punjabis (1 Baloch), Nowshera, 1917.
- 2/89th Punjabis – Raised in 1917 – India, Iraq.
- 90th Punjabis – British India, Mesopotamia.
- 2/90th Punjabis – Raised in 1918 – India. Disbanded 1922.
- 91st Punjabis (Light Infantry) – Burma, Mesopotamia, Egypt, Palestine.
- 2/91st Punjabis (Light Infantry) – Raised in 1918 – India, Egypt. Disbanded 1921.
- 92nd Punjabis – British India, Egypt, Mesopotamia, Palestine.
- 93rd Burma Infantry – India, Egypt, France, Mesopotamia, Palestine.

Only the 2/89th Punjabis of the new raisings was retained after the war.

The 8th Punjabis had a distinguished record of service during the First World War. Their list of honours and awards included the Victoria Cross awarded to Naik Shahamad Khan of 89th Punjabis in 1916. The 89th Punjabis had the unique distinction of serving in more theatres of war than any other unit of the British Empire. These included Aden, where they carried out the first opposed sea-borne assault landing in modern warfare, Egypt, Gallipoli, France, Mesopotamia, North-West Frontier of India, Salonika and Russian Transcaucasia. All battalions served in Mesopotamia, while the 93rd Burma Infantry also served in France. The 92nd Punjabis were designated as the 'Prince of Wales's Own' in 1921 for their gallantry and sacrifices during the war.

=== The Bahawalpur Infantry ===
A detachment of Bahawalpur Mounted Rifles served in Egypt and Palestine, while the Bahawalpur Camel Corps saw action in Baluchistan and Waziristan.

== Post First World War history ==
After the First World War, a major reorganization was undertaken in the British Indian Army leading to the formation of large infantry groups of four to six battalions in 1922. Among these were the 8th Punjab and 10th Baluch Regiments.

The line-up of battalions for the 10th Baluch Regiment was:

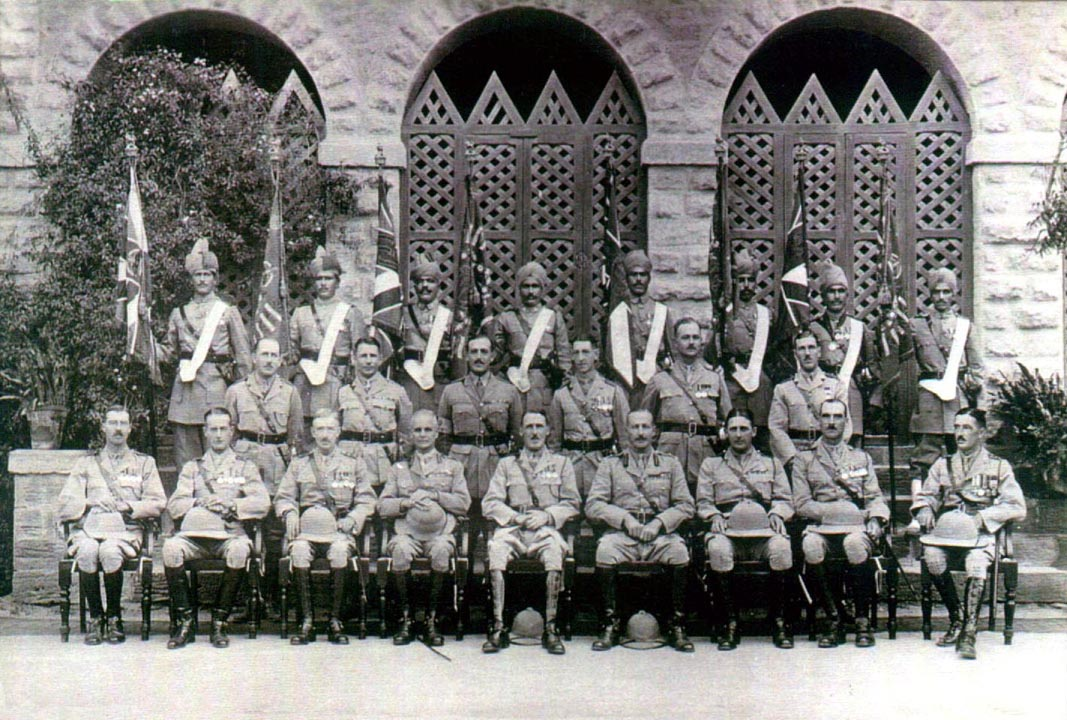
Photograph with Field Marshal Sir William Birdwood, C-in-C in India, on occasion of Colour Presentation to the 1st, 4th, 5th and 10th Battalions of 10th Baluch Regiment. Karachi, 15 November 1929.

- 1st Battalion (DCO) – 124th Duchess of Connaught's Own Baluchistan Infantry.
- 2nd Battalion – 126th Baluchistan Infantry.
- 3rd Battalion (QMO) – 127th Queen Mary's Own Baluch Light Infantry.
- 4th Battalion (DCO) – 129th Duke of Connaught's Own Baluchis.
- 5th Battalion (KGO) – 130th King George's Own Baluchis (Jacob's Rifles).
- 10th (Training) Battalion – 2/124th Duchess of Connaught's Own Baluchistan Infantry.

The regiment was based at Karachi and initially retained its traditional class composition of Punjabi Muslims, Pathans, Balochis and Brahuis. The Balochis and Brahuis are two of the main ethnic groups of Balochistan Province of Pakistan. Balochis also constitute a major part of the population of Sindh Province and Southern Punjab. However, in 1925, Balochis and Brahuis were replaced with Hindu Dogras because of the difficulty encountered in their recruitment during the war. During the inter-war period, the regiment saw continuous employment on the North West Frontier of India, keeping it in fighting trim for the great test ahead.

The distinctive rifle green and red uniform of the old Baluch battalions was adopted by the entire regiment. The officers wore a red boss surmounted by a silver 'X' on field and forage caps, while the old battalion badges were worn on pagris and helmets by the 1st, 3rd, 4th and 5th Battalions. It was not until 1945 that a single cap badge was adopted by the regiment on introduction of berets during the Second World War. It consisted of the Roman numeral 'X' within a crescent moon, a Tudor crown above and the title scroll below, all in white metal. The badges of rank were in black metal with red cloth edging, while the lanyard was of rifle green cord with two red runners. Another distinctive feature of Baluchi uniforms were plain silver ball buttons worn on service and mess dresses.

The line-up of battalions for the 8th Punjab Regiment was:

- 1st Battalion – 89th Punjabis
- 2nd Battalion – 90th Punjabis
- 3rd Battalion – 91st Punjabis (Light Infantry)
- 4th Battalion (PWO) – 92nd Prince of Wales's Own Punjabis
- 5th Battalion (Burma) – 93rd Burma Infantry
- 10th (Training) Battalion – 2/89th Punjabis

The regiment was based at Lahore and its class composition was 50% Punjabi Muslims, 25% Sikhs and 25% Hindu Gujjars. 8th Punjab Regiment also remained engaged on the North West Frontier, taking part in numerous actions and engagements during a period of constant trouble in the region. In light of the association of the constituent regiments with Burma, it was appropriate that the new regiment should adopt Chinthe – the mythical Burmese lion-dragon guardian of Buddhist pagodas, as its emblem in 1927. The cap badge was in white metal with blue backing, while the badges of rank were in gilding metal. The uniform was of drab colour with blue facings. The lanyard was also of drab colour.

In 1917, Bahawalpur State raised the Imperial Service Double Company, which was designated as 2nd Bahawalpur Household Infantry in 1922 and redesignated as 2nd Bahawalpur Haroon Infantry a year later. In 1921, Bahawalpur joined the Indian State Forces Scheme, placing its two infantry battalions at the disposal of the Government of India. The Bahawalpur Infantry was mostly composed of Punjabi Muslims. Their uniforms underwent numerous changes, until settling for grey colour in 1930. Ceremonial headdress included the distinctive 'fez', which was unique to the Bahawalpur State Forces. The badges of Bahawalpur Infantry also underwent numerous changes but usually included the pelican as their central theme.

== Baloch Regiment in the Second World War ==
=== 10th Baluch Regiment ===
- 1st Battalion – India, Iran, Iraq, Syria, Lebanon.
- 2nd Battalion – India, Malaya. Captured at Singapore in 1942. Reformed in 1946 by redesignation of 9/10th Baluch.
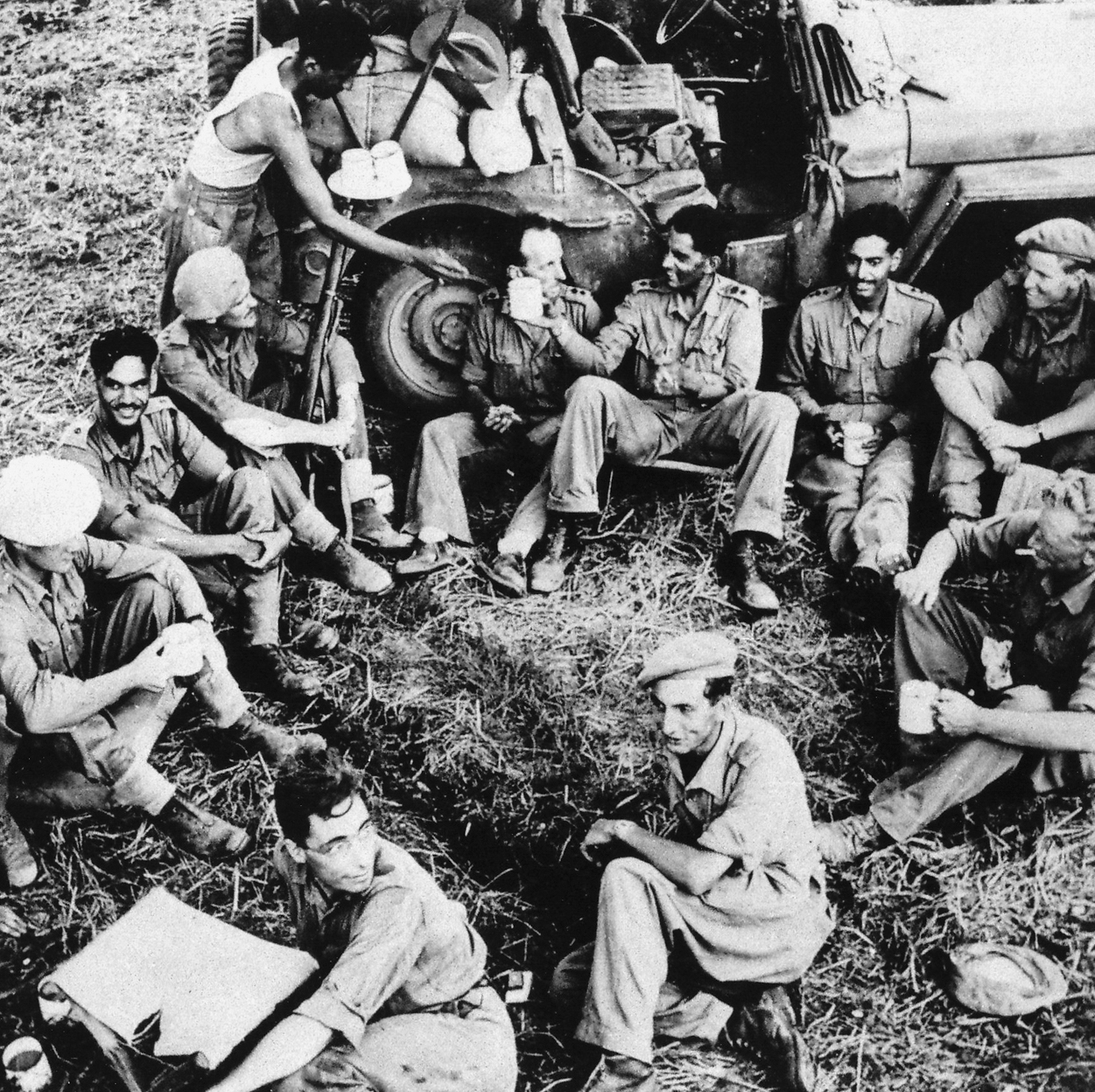
  Officers of 7/10th Baluch (15 Baloch) after the fall of Pegu, Burma, 1945.
- 3rd Battalion – India, Iran, Iraq, North Africa, Sicily, Italy, Greece.
- 4th Battalion – India, Italian East Africa, North Africa, Cyprus, Italy.
- 5th Battalion – India, Burma.
- 6th Battalion – Raised in 1940. India. Disbanded 1947; re-raised 1948.
- 7th Battalion – Raised in 1940. India, Burma.
- 8th Battalion – Raised in 1941. India, Burma. Disbanded 1946; re-raised 1948.
- 9th Battalion – Raised in 1941. India. Redesignated as 2 Baluch in 1946.
- 10th Battalion – Converted into Regimental Centre in 1942.
- 14th Battalion – Raised in 1941. India, Burma, Malaya, Siam. Disbanded 1946.
- 15th Battalion – Raised in 1941. Became a training battalion. India. Disbanded 1946.
- 16th Battalion – Raised in 1941. India, Burma, Malaya. Disbanded 1946.
- 17th Battalion – Raised in 1942 by conversion of 53rd Regiment, Indian Armoured Corps. India, Iran, Iraq, Palestine, Greece, Libya.
- 18th Battalion – Raised as 25th Garrison Battalion in 1941. Redesignated as 18/10th Baluch in 1943. India. Disbanded 1944.
- 25th Garrison Battalion – Raised in 1941. On conversion to active status, it was redesignated as 18/10th Baluch in 1943.
- 26th Garrison Battalion – Raised in 1942. India. Disbanded 1946.
- Machine Gun Battalion – Raised on 15 April 1942. Converted into 53rd Regiment, Indian Armoured Corps in August 1942. Redesignated as 17/10th Baluch in November 1942.

During the Second World War, the 10th Baluch regiment raised ten new battalions. The regiment fought in all the major theatres of war, and its record of service was once again most impressive. It suffered 6572 casualties and won numerous gallantry awards including two Victoria Crosses to Naik Fazal Din and Sepoy Bhandari Ram. At the end of 1945, the 10th Baluch Regiment lost its number and became The Baluch Regiment.

=== 8th Punjab Regiment ===
- 1st Battalion – India, Malaya. Captured at Singapore in 1942. Reformed in 1946 by redesignation of 9/8th Punjab.
  King George VI inspecting 3/8th Punjab (3 Baloch), Siena, Italy, 26 July 1944.
- 2nd Battalion – India, Burma, French Indochina.
- 3rd Battalion – India, Iran, Italy.
- 4th Battalion – India, Iraq, Iran.
- 5th Battalion – India, Burma, Malaya, Dutch East Indies.
- 6th Battalion (Machine Gun) – Raised in 1940. India, Malaya, Dutch East Indies. Disbanded January 1948; re-raised October 1948.
- 7th Battalion – Raised in 1940. India, Malaya. Captured at Singapore in February 1942.
- 8th Battalion – Raised in 1941. India, Burma.
- 9th Battalion – Raised in 1941. India, Ceylon, Cyprus. Redesignated as 1/8th Punjab in 1946. Re-raised 1948.
- 10th Battalion – Converted into Regimental Centre in 1942.
- 14th Battalion – Raised in 1941. Converted into 9th (Punjab) Heavy Anti-aircraft Regiment, Indian Artillery, in 1942. India, Ceylon. Disbanded 1946.
- 15th Battalion – Raised in 1942. Became a training battalion. India. Disbanded 1946.
- 16th Battalion – Raised in 1943. Became a training battalion. India. Disbanded 1946.
- 25th Garrison Battalion – Raised in 1941. India. Disbanded 1946.
- 26th Garrison Battalion – Raised in 1942. India. Disbanded 1946.

The 8th Punjab Regiment also greatly distinguished itself in the war, suffering more than 4500 casualties. It was awarded two Victoria Crosses to Havildar Parkash Singh and Sepoy Kamal Ram, besides numerous other gallantry awards.

=== The Bahawalpur Regiment ===
- 1st Battalion – India, Malaya. Captured at Singapore in February 1942. Reformed in 1946.
- 2nd Battalion – India.
- 3rd Battalion – Raised in 1940. India. Converted into Training Centre in 1946.
- 4th Battalion – Raised in 1944. India. Re-designated as 3rd Bahawalpur Light Infantry in 1946.

Captain Mahmood Khan Durrani of 1st Bahawalpur Infantry was awarded the George Cross "for outstanding courage, loyalty and fortitude whilst a Prisoner of War" of the Japanese.

== Independence ==
Following the independence of Pakistan in 1947, the 8th Punjab and Baloch Regiments were allotted to Pakistan. Dogra companies of the Baloch Regiment were transferred to the Indian Army. The Regimental Centre shifted to Quetta in 1947, to make room for government offices in the new capital of Pakistan. On 7 July, Baloch (present 15 Baloch) moved to Karachi to prepare for ceremonies in connection with the Independence of Pakistan. The battalion has the distinction of providing the first guard of honour to Quaid-i-Azam Muhammad Ali Jinnah, as he stepped on the soil of Pakistan. On 14 August, the Subedar Major unfurled the first flag at the Governor General’s residence. Officers and men of the Baloch Regiment earned the honoured title of 'Ghazi Balochi' for protecting Muslim refugees fleeing India from marauding bands of Sikhs and Hindus.

The 8th Punjab Regimental Centre remained at Lahore. Sikh and Gujjar companies were exchanged with Hindustani Muslims from regiments allotted to India.

In 1947, Bahawalpur State acceded to Pakistan and in 1952 the Bahawalpur Infantry was integrated into the Pakistan Army as the Bahawalpur Regiment. The regiment was entirely composed of Punjabi Muslims. The Regimental Centre was based at Dera Nawab Sahib. The uniform of the new regiment was of rifle green colour with scarlet facings. Officers' winter mess kit was of French grey cloth with black cuffs and facings with and blue overalls. The cummerband was rifle green. The cap badge of gilding metal consisted of a pelican surmounted by a star and crescent, the whole surrounded by a date palm wreath, with a scroll below, inscribed 'Bahawalpur Regiment'. Backing for the cap badge was of circular maroon cloth. Badges of rank were in gilding-metal. The lanyard was of a maroon cord. In July 1948, 5th Bahawalpur Light Infantry was raised from Muslim officers and men of 2nd Patiala Infantry, who had opted for Pakistan. It was redesignated as 4 Bahawalpur in 1952.

== Amalgamation ==
In 1956, a major re-organization was undertaken in the Pakistan Army and the existing infantry regiments were amalgamated to form larger regiments. The Baloch Regiment was reorganized by merging the 10th Baloch, 8th Punjab and the Bahawalpur Regiments. The new regimental centre was initially set up at Multan; moving to Abbottabad in December 1957. The new line up of the regiment was:

- 1 Baloch – 1/8th Punjab
- 2 Baloch – 2/8th Punjab
- 3 Baloch – 3/8th Punjab
- 4 Baloch – 4/8th Punjab (Prince of Wales's Own)
- 5 Baloch – 5/8th Punjab (Burma)
- 6 Baloch – 1/10th Baluch (Duchess of Connaught's Own)
- 7 Baloch – 2/10th Baluch
- 8 Baloch – 1 Bahawalpur (Sadiq)
- 9 Baloch – 2 Bahawalpur (Haroon)
- 10 Baloch – 3/10th Baluch (Queen Mary's Own)
- 11 Baloch – 4/10th Baluch (Duke of Connaught's Own)
- 12 Baloch – 5/10th Baluch (King George V's Own) (Jacob's Rifles)
- 13 Baloch – 6/8th Punjab (later 1st Battalion, Sindh Regiment)
- 14 Baloch – 6/10th Baluch
- 15 Baloch – 7/10th Baluch
- 16 Baloch – 8/10th Baluch
- 17 Baloch – 8/8th Punjab (later 2 Sindh Regiment)
- 18 Baloch – 9/8th Punjab (later 3 Sindh Regiment)
- 19 Baloch (SSG) – 17/10th Baluch
- 20 Baloch – 3 Bahawalpur (Abbas)
- 21 Baloch – 4 Bahawalpur

== Post-amalgamation history ==
In 1955, Pakistan raised the Special Service Group (SSG) from the old 17/10th Baluch at Cherat, a hill station near Peshawar. In 1979–80, the Baloch Regiment transferred ten battalions (13th, 17th, 18th, 44th, 46th, 48th, 49th, 51st, 52nd and 53rd Baluch) to the newly formed Sind Regiment, while 61st Baluch was transferred in 1988. Based at Abbottabad since December 1957, the Balochis have fought with distinction in every operation/engagement of the Pakistan Army since independence, winning numerous awards for gallantry. In 1948, 11 Baluch captured the strategic heights of Pandu in Kashmir, while Balochis played a vital role in blunting the Indian offensive against Lahore in 1965. They also fought in the Rann of Kutch, at Chhamb-Jaurian, Sialkot, Chawinda, Kasur and Sulemanki. In 1971, the regiment again performed creditably on both the fronts. The newly raised 41 Baluch captured the Indian fortress of Qaisar-i-Hind, while a company of 31 Baluch, augmented with para-military troops, held up an entire Indian brigade for three weeks in the defence of Kamalpur. The regiment has also produced the two most successful field commanders of Pakistan Army, namely, Major General Abrar Husain, Commander of 6 Armoured Division in 1965, who blunted the Indian offensive in Sialkot Sector, and Major General Eftikhar Khan Janjua, who captured the strategic town of Chhamb in 1971. During the Indo-Pakistani Wars of 1948, 1965 and 1971, the regiment was awarded 6 Hilal-i-Jurat with one bar, 64 Sitara-i-Jurat with 4 bars and 70 Tamgha-i-Jurat, while more than 1500 officers and men sacrificed their lives in defence of Pakistan. Since then, the regiment has continued to uphold its reputation and rendered valuable services in the country's defense; in aid to civil authorities during natural disasters and insurgencies, including counter-terrorism operations; and as United Nations Peacekeepers.

The present badge of the Baloch Regiment, adopted in 1959, depicts crossed Mughal swords within a crescent, under the Islamic Star of Glory, appearing above a title scroll. All ranks wear a rifle green beret with a cherry coloured backing for the badge. Officers wear a cherry coloured boss surmounted by a silver star on forage caps. Badges of rank are in black metal with cherry edging. Bandsmen wear the traditional rifle green tunic and cherry trousers of the old Baluch battalions. The Regimental Tartan is the Baluch Regiment Tartan.

== Regimental bands ==
Regimental bands have been a part of Baloch battalions since their inception. However, the first recorded mention of a Baloch regimental band is from 1834, when a Singapore newspaper reported the regret of its citizens on the departure of 29th Madras Native infantry (1 Baloch), whose band had regularly entertained them during the battalion's stay at the station. Meanwhile, a British officer on a visit to Bahawalpur in 1835 recorded that Bahawalpur Infantry had corps of drums "to which they marched in very good time", made up of drummers and flautists.

A photograph of 1st Belooch Regiment (10 Baloch) from 1868, shows it on parade in Abyssinia with a 16-strong drum and bugle corps made up of buglers, snare and bass drummers. In 1877, the battalion acquired a brass band, which it retained until 1929. By the turn of the century, 24th Baluchistan Infantry (6 Baloch) and 2nd Baluch Battalion (11 Baloch) were maintaining dhol & surnai bands, which were peculiar to Baluchis, and were later adopted by all Baluch battalions alongside the bugles, forming a local variant of the British tradition. Around this time, Scottish bagpipes were introduced in the Indian Army, mostly on the initiative of individual commanding officers. In 1889, 12 Baloch became the first Baluch battalion to acquire a pipe band. It was followed by 7 Baloch in 1892 and 6 Baloch in 1901. After the First World War, brass bands, which were expensive to maintain, were replaced by pipe bands in all Baluch battalions. However, the 8th Punjabis retained their brass band until the Second World War, after which it was converted to pipes and drums.

Baluchis quickly adopted bagpipes as their own and were soon winning renown for the accomplishment of their pipers. In 1924, the pipe band of 2/10th Baluch (7 Baloch) toured England along with the brass band of 4/8th Punjab (4 Baloch), as the best infantry bands in the Indian Army. In 1946, the honour of being the best in the Army was claimed by the pipe band of 8th Punjab Regimental Centre, which was selected to lead the Indian infantry contingent in the Victory Parade in London on 8 June 1946. Led by the renowned piper Jemadar Ghulam Haider, the band received much acclaim during its visit to the United Kingdom. After the Second World War, a brass band of 8th Punjab Regimental Centre was formed under the legendary bandmaster Jemadar Wazir Ali of 4/8th Punjab. During his long service from 1893 to 1949, he had made 4/8th Punjab's brass band the envy of the Indian Army. The brass band of 8th Punjab Regimental Centre and the pipe band of Baluch Regimental Centre under Pipe Major Karam Dad took part in Independence celebrations at Karachi in August 1947.

After their formation in 1922, all infantry regiments adopted their own regimental marches, which were selected from among British military tunes. The marching tune of Baluch Regiment was ‘Blue Bonnets over the Border’, while ‘God Bless the Prince of Wales’ was the regimental march of 8th Punjab Regiment. The Baloch Regiment now marches to the tune of ‘Barhay Chalo’. Balochis have maintained their excellence in martial music after independence. All Baloch battalions have pipe bands, while the Regimental Centre maintains a brass band. Pipes and Drums of the Regiment have won many awards in international competitions. Prominent among them is 3 Baloch, which won the prestigious Duke of Edinburgh's Piping Trophy for four successive years from 1962 to 1965. It also won the President's Trophy for Best Infantry Pipe Band of Pakistan Army in 1982. Meanwhile, the military band of Baloch Regimental Centre has won the Annual Army Band Competition eleven times. The Army School of Music, which is based at Abbottabad since 1956, was affiliated with Baloch Regimental Centre from 1965 to 2004.

== Battle honours ==
- 1798–1914: Cochin, Maheidpoor, Ava, Aden, Reshire, Bushire, Khoosh-ab, Persia, Delhi 1857, Central India, Abyssinia, Kandahar 1880, Afghanistan 1878–80, Tel-el-Kebir, Egypt 1882, Burma 1885–87, British East Africa 1896, British East Africa 1897-99, China 1900.
- World War I: Messines 1914, Armentières 1914, Ypres 1914, Gheluvelt, Festubert 1914, Givenchy 1914, Neuve Chapelle, Ypres 1915, St Julien, Loos, France and Flanders 1914–15, Macedonia 1918, Helles, Krithia, Gallipoli 1915, Suez Canal, Egypt 1915–17, Gaza, Megiddo, Sharon, Nablus, Palestine 1917–18, Aden, Tigris 1916, Kut al Amara 1917, Baghdad, Khan Baghdadi, Mesopotamia 1915–18, Persia 1915–18, NW Frontier, India 1917, Baluchistan 1918, Kilimanjaro, Behobeho, East Africa 1915–18.
- Afghanistan 1919.
- World War II: Gallabat, Barentu, Keren, Massawa, Abyssinia 1940–41, The Cauldron, Mersa Matruh, Ruweisat Ridge, El Alamein, North Africa 1940–43, Landing in Sicily, Sicily 1943, The Trigno, Perano, The Sangro, Castel Frentano, Orsogna, Gustav Line, Arezzo, Monte Cedrone, Citta di Castello, Gothic Line, Monte Calvo, Pian di Castello, Croce, Gemmano Ridge, San Marino, Monte Farneto, San Paolo-Monte Spaccato, Cesena, Savio Bridgehead, Casa Bettini, Monte Grande, The Senio, Idice Bridgehead, Italy 1943–45, Athens, Greece 1944–45, North Malaya, Jitra, Machang, Gurun, Kampar, Johore, Singapore Island, Malaya 1941–42, Kuzeik, Donbaik, North Arakan, Maungdaw, Point 551, The Shweli, Shwebo, Kyaukmyaung Bridgehead, Mandalay, Myitson, Capture of Meiktila, Defence of Meiktila, The Irrawaddy, Kama, Pegu 1945, Sittang 1945, Burma 1942–45.
- Post-independence: Kashmir 1948, Khem Karan 1965, Chawinda 1965, Dewa-Chamb 1965, Jaurian 1965, Sialkot 1965, Lahore 1965, Sulemanki 1965, Rann of Kutch 1965, Kasur 1965, Hajipir 1965, Qaisar-i-Hind 1971, Chhamb 1971, Zafarwal 1971, Lahore 1971.

== Colonels-in-chief ==
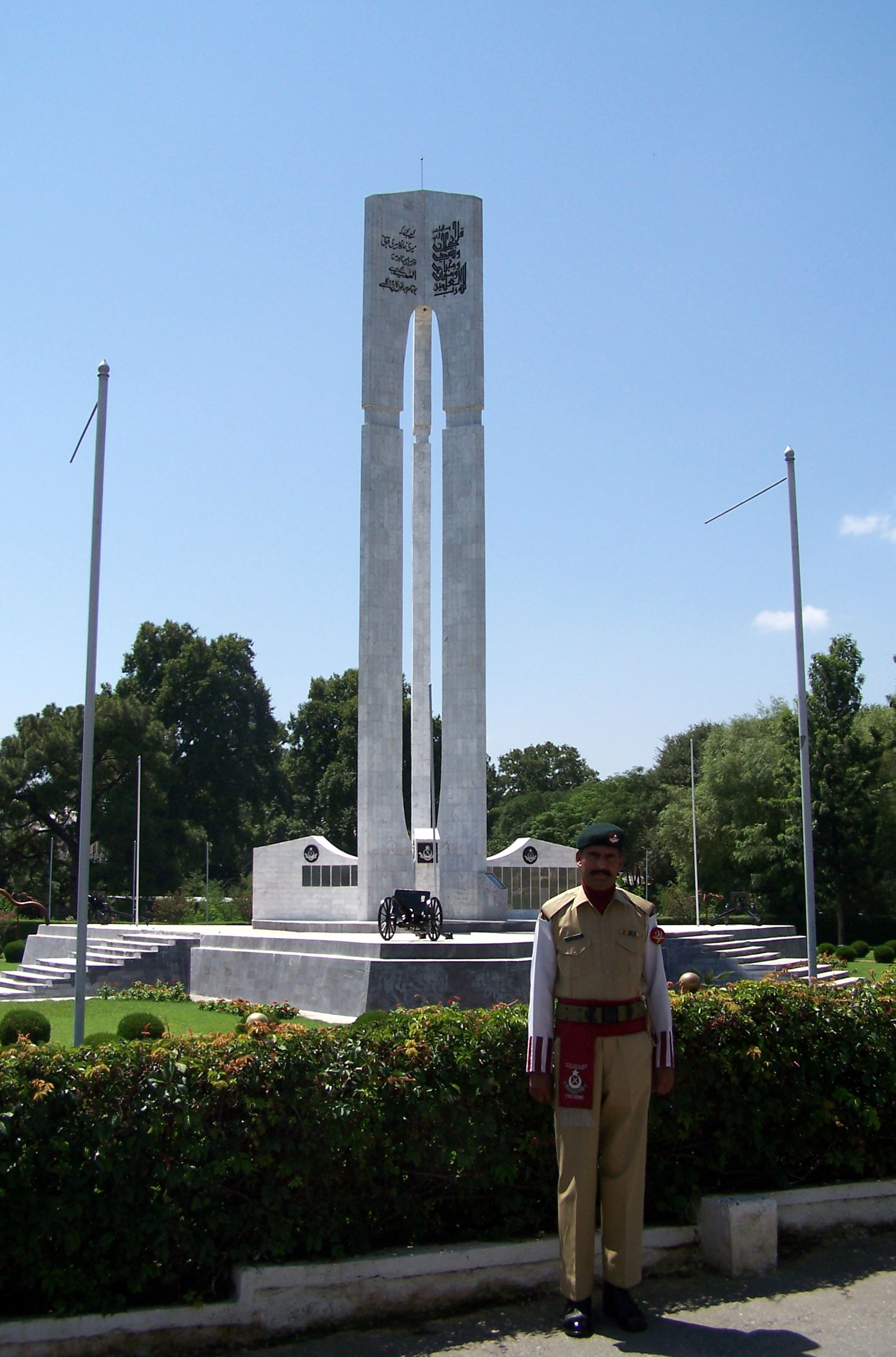
Baloch Regiment War Memorial, Abbottabad, Pakistan.

=== 10th Baluch Regiment ===
- King George V

=== 8th Punjab Regiment ===
- King Edward VIII

=== Bahawalpur Regiment ===
- Amir Sadeq Mohammad Khan V of Bahawalpur

=== Post-amalgamation Baloch Regiment ===
- General AM Yahya Khan, HPk, HJ (1966) - 11 Baloch
- General Mirza Aslam Beg, NI (M), SBt (1989) - 16 Baloch/36 Baloch
- General Ashfaq Parvez Kayani, NI (M), HI (2007) - 5 Baloch
- General Rashad Mahmood, NI (M) (2014) - 7 Baloch
- General Qamar Javed Bajwa, NI (M) (2017) - 16 Baloch

== Colonels commandant ==
- Lieutenant General M Habibullah Khan Khattak, SPk (1957) – 12 Baloch
- Major General Sayad Ghawas, SQA (1961) – 12 Baloch
- General Abdul Hamid Khan, HQA, SPk (1966) – 10 Baloch
- Lieutenant General Abdul Hameed Khan, HQA, SPk (1973) – 10 Baloch
- Major General Ghulam Mohammad, HI (M) (1977) – 12 Baloch
- General Rahimuddin Khan, NI (M), SBt (1982) – 6 Baloch
- Lieutenant General Muhammad Ashraf, HI (M), SBt (1989) – 5 Baloch
- Lieutenant General Iftikhar Ali Khan, HI (M) (1993) – 11 Baloch
- Lieutenant General Ali Kuli Khan Khattak, HI (M) (1997) – 12 Baloch
- Lieutenant General Agha Jehangir Ali Khan, HI (M) (1999) – 16 Baloch
- Lieutenant General Khalid Maqbool, HI (M) (2001) – 2 & 38 Baloch
- Lieutenant General Jamshaid Gulzar, HI (M) (2002) – 22 Baloch
- Lieutenant General Syed Parwez Shahid, HI (M) (2003) – 11 Baloch
- Lieutenant General Ashfaq Parvez Kayani, HI (M), HI (2005) – 5 & 30 Baloch
- Lieutenant General Shafaat Ullah Shah, HI (M) (2007) – 36 Baloch
- Lieutenant General Khalid Nawaz Khan, HI (M) (2010) – 3 Baloch
- Lieutenant General Qamar Javed Bajwa, HI (M) (2013) – 16 Baloch
- Lieutenant General Malik Zafar Iqbal, HI (M) (2017) – 3 Baloch
- Lieutenant General Azhar Abbas, HI (M) (2019) - 41 Baloch
- Lieutenant General Muhammad Asim Malik, HI (M) (2023) - 12 Baloch

== Famous soldiers of the regiment ==
- Captain William Kerr, VC (Victoria Cross recipient, 1857) – 6 Baloch
- General Sir O'Moore Creagh, VC, GCB, GCSI (C-in-C in India 1909–14) – 11 Baloch
- Field Marshal Sir Claud Jacob, GCB, GCSI, KCMG (C-in-C in India 1925) – 6 & 12 Baloch
- Colonel CJW Grant, VC (Victoria Cross recipient, 1891) – 1 & 4 Baloch
- General Sir Edward Quinan, KCB, KCIE, DSO, OBE (GOC British Tenth Army 1942–43) – 3 Baloch
- Lieutenant General Sir Harold Briggs, KCIE, KBE, CB, DSO & 2 Bars (GOC 5th Indian Division 1942–44) – 6 & 7 Baloch
- Lieutenant General M Habibullah Khan Khattak, SPk (COS Army 1958–59) – 12 Baloch
- General GG Bewoor, PVSM (COAS India 1973–75) – 12 Baloch
- General AM Yahya Khan, HPk, HJ (President 1969–71 & C-in-C Army 1966–71) – 10 & 11 Baloch
- General Abdul Hamid Khan, HQA, SPk (COS Army 1969–71) – 10 Baloch
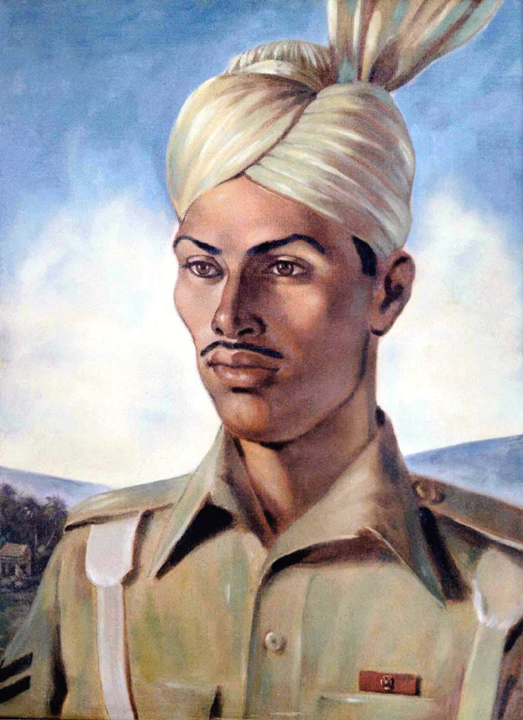
  Naik Fazal Din, VC, 7/10th Baluch.
- Lieutenant Colonel Mahmood Khan Durrani, GC (1945) – 8 Baloch
- Major General Abrar Husain, HJ, MBE (GOC 6 Armoured Division 1965) – 7 Baloch
- Lance Havaldar Laal Khan SSG(Baloch Regiment), TJ, 1958
- Major General Eftikhar Khan Janjua, HJ & Bar, SPk, SQA (GOC 23 Division 1971) – 10 Baloch
- Major General AO Mitha, HJ, SPk, SQA (First CO of SSG 1955–61) – 1 & 18 Baluch
- General Rahimuddin Khan, NI (M), SBt (CJSC 1984–87) – 6 Baloch
- General Mirza Aslam Beg, NI (M), SBt (COAS 1988–91) – 16, 30, 36 & 53 Baloch
- General Ashfaq Parvez Kayani, NI (M), HI (COAS 2007–13) – 5 & 30 Baloch
- General Tariq Majid, NI (M) (CJSC 2007–10) – 28 Baloch
- General Rashad Mahmood, NI (M) (CJSC 2013) – 7 Baloch
- General Qamar Javed Bajwa, HI (M) (COAS 2016–) – 16 Baloch
- Sepoy Khudadad Khan, VC (Victoria Cross recipient, 1914) – 11 Baloch
- Naik Shahamad Khan, VC (Victoria Cross recipient, 1916) – 1 Baloch
- Havildar Parkash Singh, VC (Victoria Cross recipient, 1943) – 5 Baloch
- Sepoy Kamal Ram, VC (Victoria Cross recipient, 1944) – 3 Baloch
- Sepoy Bhandari Ram, VC (Victoria Cross recipient, 1945)
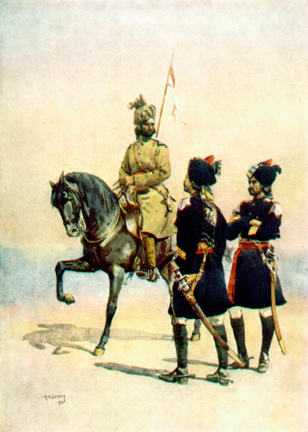
  37th Lancers (Baluch Horse) (left). Watercolour by Major AC Lovett, 1910.
- Naik Fazal Din, VC (Victoria Cross recipient, 1945) – 15 Baloch
- Brigadier Abdul Qayum Sher, HJ (Commander 22 Brigade 1965) – 16 Baloch

== Affiliations and alliances ==
- (Pakistan) 1st, 2nd, 3rd, 6th, 10th, 11th, 12th, 16th, 19th, 20th & 23rd Battalions The Sind Regiment
- (Pakistan) 13th Lancers
- (Pakistan) 15th Lancers (Baloch)
- (Pakistan) 1st (SP) Medium Regiment, Artillery (FF)
- (Pakistan) 14 (Abbasia) Field Regiment, Artillery
- (Pakistan) 164 Field Regiment, Artillery (Baloch)
- (Pakistan) 155 SP Air Defence Regiment
- (Pakistan) 1st Battalion The Frontier Force Regiment – 3 Baloch
- (United Kingdom) 2nd Battalion The Royal Welsh (The Royal Regiment of Wales) – 4 Baloch
- (United Kingdom) 3rd Battalion The Mercian Regiment (Staffords) – 7 Baloch
- (United Kingdom) The Yorkshire Regiment (previously The Duke of Wellington's Regiment) – 10 Baloch
- (United Kingdom) The Rifles – 11 Baloch
- (United Kingdom) The Royal Highland Fusiliers, 2nd Battalion The Royal Regiment of Scotland – 11 Baloch

== Bibliography ==
- Ahmad, Maj Rifat Nadeem, and Ahmed, Maj Gen Rafiuddin. (2006). Unfaded Glory: The 8th Punjab Regiment 1798–1956. Abbottabad: The Baloch Regimental Centre. ISBN 9781783311040
- Ahmad, Lt Col Rifat Nadeem. (2010). Battle Honours of the Baloch Regiment. Abbottabad: The Baloch Regimental Centre.
- Ahmad, Lt Col Rifat Nadeem. (2012). The Gallant One: War Services of First Battalion The Baloch Regiment. Rawalpindi: The Battalion.
- Ahmad, Lt Col Rifat Nadeem. (2017). History of the Baloch Regiment. Abbottabad: The Baloch Regimental Centre.
- Ahmed, Maj Gen Rafiuddin. (1998). History of the Baloch Regiment 1820–1939. Abbottabad: The Baloch Regimental Centre. ISBN 1-84734-130-6
- Ahmed, Maj Gen Rafiuddin. (2000). History of the Baloch Regiment 1939–1956. Abbottabad: The Baloch Regimental Centre. ISBN 1-84574-094-7
- Ahmed, Lt Col Habib. (2015). The Battle of Hussainiwala and Qaiser-i-Hind, The 1971 War. Karachi: Oxford University Press.
- Barthorp, Michael; Jeffrey Burn (1979). Indian Infantry Regiments 1860–1914. London: Osprey Publishing. ISBN 978-0-85045-307-2.
- Beatson, Brig Gen S. (1903). A History of the Imperial Service Troops of Native States. Calcutta: Superintendent of Government Printing, India.
- Cadell, Sir Patrick. (1938). History of the Bombay Army. London: Longmans & Green.
- Chaldecott, Lt Col OA. (1935). The First Battalion (DCO) and the Tenth Battalion, the Tenth Baluch Regiment. Aldershot: Gale & Polden.
- Cook, HCB. (1987). The Battle Honours of the British and Indian Armies 1662–1982. London: Leo Cooper. ISBN 0-85052-082-7
- Gaylor, John (1991). Sons of John Company: The Indian and Pakistan Armies 1903–91. Stroud: Spellmount Publishers Ltd. ISBN 978-0-946771-98-1.
- Geoghegan, Col NM, and Campbell, Capt MHA. (1928). History of the 1st Battalion 8th Punjab Regiment. Aldershot: Gale & Polden.
- Haycraft, Maj WS. (1921). Regimental History, 1914–1920, 93rd Burma Infantry. Cardiff: William Lewis.
- Head, Richard W. (1981). The Bahawalpur Army: A History of the Army's Origins, Composition and Achievements. (Manuscript).
- Maxwell, Lt Col WE. (1948). Capital Campaigners: The History of the 3rd Battalion (Queen Mary's Own) the Baluch Regiment. Aldershot: Gale & Polden. ISBN 1847347460
- Phythian-Adams, Lt Col EG. (1943). Madras Infantry 1748–1943. Madras: The Government Press.
- Poulsom, Lt Col NW, and Ahmad, Lt Col RN. (2011). Uniforms & Devices of the Baloch Regiment. Abbottabad: The Baloch Regimental Centre.
- Qureshi, Lt Col IA. (1966). History of 11th Battalion, the Baluch Regiment. Lahore: The Allied Press.
- Riza, Maj Gen Shaukat. (1989). The Pakistan Army 1947–49. Rawalpindi: Services Book Club.
- Rodger, Alexander. (2003). Battle Honours of the British Empire and Commonwealth Land Forces 1662–1991. Ramsbury: The Crowood Press. ISBN 1-86126-637-5
- Sumner, Ian (2001). The Indian Army 1914–1947. London: Osprey. ISBN 1-84176-196-6.
- Thatcher, WS. (1932). The Fourth Battalion, Duke of Connaught's Own, Tenth Baluch Regiment in the Great War. Cambridge: The University Press. ISBN 1-84734-752-5
- Thatcher, WS. (1980). The Tenth Baluch Regiment in the Second World War. Abbottabad: The Baluch Regimental Centre.
- Vaughan, Maj MV. History of 3/8 Punjab Regiment. (Manuscript).
- Wilson, Lt Col WJ. (1882–88). History of the Madras Army. Madras: The Government Press.
