= 1st Battalion, Sindh Regiment =

Pakistan Army battalion

1st Battalion, Sindh Regiment 13th Battalion, Baloch Regiment 6th Battalion, 8th Punjab Regiment
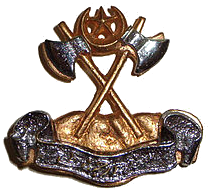
- Regimental cap badge
- Founded: 1940 / 1956 / 1980
- Country: Pakistan
- Allegiance: British India (1940 - 47); Pakistan (1947 - onwards)
- Branch: British Indian Army; Pakistan Army
- Role: Line infantry
- Size: 1 battalion
- Part of: Sindh Regiment
- Regimental centre: Hyderabad, Sindh
- Engagements: Second World War 1940-45 (Malaya, Dutch East Indies); Kashmir War 1948

The 1st Battalion, Sindh Regiment is an infantry battalion of the Sindh Regiment of the Pakistan Army.

== History ==
The battalion was originally raised in 1940 as the 6th Battalion (Machine Gun), 8th Punjab Regiment in the British Indian Army. It initially served on the North West Frontier in:

- Peshawar Brigade
- Razmak Brigade
- Landi Kotal Brigade (August 1943 - September 1944)

From May to October 1945 the battalion participated in the Burma campaign as part of 23rd Indian Infantry Division. Its companies provided machine gun support to the 1st, 37th, and 49th Indian Infantry Brigades. The battalion was then sent with the 23rd Division to Central Java in November 1945. From April 1946 it transferred to the Buitenzorg Brigade when the remainder of the division returned to India.

After the war, in 1946, most of the war-raised battalions of the 8th Punjab were deactivated except the 6th and 8th Battalions.

Upon the independence of India and Pakistan in August 1947, the battalion was assigned to the Pakistan Army together with the rest of 8th Punjab and several other infantry regiments including the 10th Baluch Regiment and the Bahawalpur Regiment. Sikhs and Gujars in the battalion were exchanged with Muslims from units allocated to the Indian Army. In January 1948 the battalion was deactivated but was raised again in October 1948, in response to the Kashmir War with India.

In 1956, Pakistan merged the 8th Punjab with the 10th Baluch and the Bahawalpur Regiments to form the Baloch Regiment. The 6th Battalion was re-designated as 13th Battalion, Baloch Regiment.

Since independence, the Pakistan Army had been dominated by Punjabis, with as much as 77% of army personnel being from that group. A specific regiment was created to address concerns of underrepresentation of Sindhis. This was done on 1 July 1980 by the transfer of eleven battalions from the Punjab Regiment and ten battalions from the Baloch Regiment. The 13th Battalion, Baloch Regiment was re-designated as 1st Battalion, Sindh Regiment. After 1989 the proportion of Sindhis in the regiment was increased to over 50%.

== Battle honours ==
- Burma campaign (May 1945)
- Central Java (1945–1946)

== Alliances and affiliations ==
- British Army - The Rifles
