= 126th Baluchistan Infantry =

- Active: 1903–1922
- Country: India
- Branch: British Indian Army
- Type: Infantry
- Size: 1 Battalion
- Uniform: Red; faced light buff; yellow in 1884; Drab; faced red with red trousers in 1892
- Engagements: Anglo-Persian War 1856-57; Boxer Rebellion; First World War (Aden, Mesopotamia, Egypt)

The 126th Baluchistan Infantry was an infantry regiment of the British Indian Army raised in 1825 as the 2nd Extra Battalion of Bombay Native Infantry. It was designated as the 126th Baluchistan Infantry in 1903 and became 2nd Battalion 10th Baluch Regiment in 1922. In 1947, it was allocated to the Pakistan Army, where it continues to exist as 7th Battalion of The Baloch Regiment.

== Early history ==
The regiment was raised in 1825 at Bombay as the 2nd Extra Battalion of Bombay Native Infantry. In 1826, it was designated as the 26th Regiment of Bombay Native Infantry. In 1856, it was dispatched to Persia, where it took part in the Battle of Kooshab during the Anglo-Persian War of 1856-57. In 1891, the regiment was localized to the Province of Baluchistan and reconstituted with Balochis, Brahuis, Pathans and Punjabi Muslims. It adopted uniforms of drab colour with red trousers and its designation was changed to 26th (Baluchistan) Regiment of Bombay Infantry. In 1900 it was sent to China to suppress the Boxer Rebellion. In 1901, the regiment's designation was changed to 26th Baluchistan Infantry.

== 126th Baluchistan Infantry ==
Subsequent to the reforms brought about in the Indian Army by Lord Kitchener in 1903, all former Bombay Army units had 100 added to their numbers. Consequently, the regiment's designation was changed to 126th Baluchistan Infantry and it was delocalized from Baluchistan. On the outbreak of the First World War, the regiment was sent to Aden, where it remained during the war except for brief stays in Egypt in 1915 and Mesopotamia in 1917.

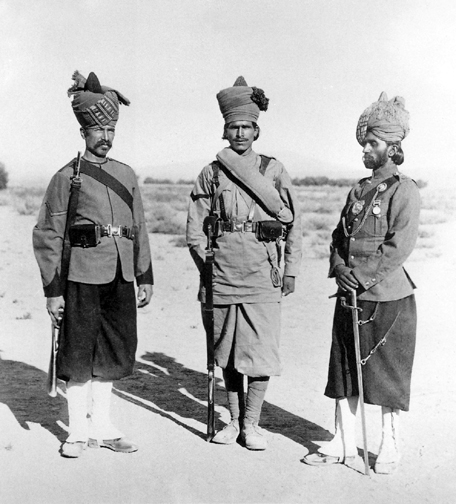
26th (Baluchistan) Regiment, Bombay Infantry, 1897.

== Subsequent History ==
In 1922, the regiment was grouped with five other Baluch battalions: 1st & 2nd Battalions of 124th Duchess of Connaught's Own Baluchistan Infantry, 127th Queen Mary's Own Baluch Light Infantry, 129th Duke of Connaught's Own Baluchis and the 130th King George's Own Baluchis (Jacob's Rifles), to form the 10th Baluch Regiment. The 126th Baluchistan Infantry was redesignated as the 2nd Battalion of the new regiment. During the Second World War, 2/10th Baluch fought with great gallantry in the Malayan Campaign. The battalion was taken prisoner by the Japanese on Singapore Island after the surrender of British forces on 15 February 1942. It suffered a total of 1596 casualties in the war and during the Japanese captivity. The battalion won distinction for resisting intense enemy pressure to join the Japanese-sponsored Indian National Army. Prominent among them was Lieutenant Abrar Hussain, who was awarded the MBE for his heroic conduct whilst a Prisoner of War. On its return from captivity, the battalion was reformed in 1946. On the independence of Pakistan in 1947, the Baluch Regiment was allocated to Pakistan Army. In 1956, on the merger of 8th Punjab and Bahawalpur Regiments with the Baluch Regiment, 2 Baluch was redesignated as 7 Baluch (now 7 Baloch). During the Indo-Pakistan War of 1965, the battalion fought with distinction in the Kasur Sector.

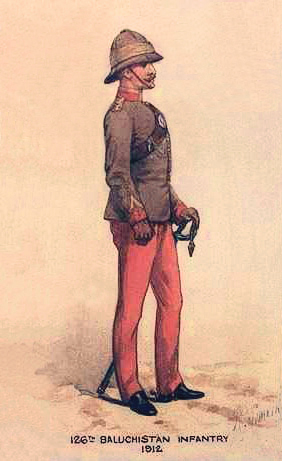
Officer of 126th Baluchistan Infantry. Illustration by Richard Simkin, 1912.

== Genealogy ==
- 1825 - 2nd Extra Battalion of Bombay Native Infantry
- 1826 - 26th Regiment of Bombay Native Infantry
- 1885 - 26th Regiment of Bombay Infantry
- 1892 - 26th (Baluchistan) Regiment of Bombay Infantry
- 1901 - 26th Baluchistan Infantry
- 1903 - 126th Baluchistan Infantry
- 1922 - 2nd Battalion 10th Baluch Regiment or 2/10th Baluch
- 1945 - 2nd Battalion The Baluch Regiment or 2 Baluch
- 1956 - 7th Battalion The Baluch Regiment or 7 Baluch
- 1991 - 7th Battalion The Baloch Regiment or 7 Baloch

== See also ==
- 10th Baluch Regiment
- The Baloch Regiment
- Major General Abrar Hussain, HJ, MBE
