= 129th Duke of Connaught's Own Baluchis =

Infantry regiment of the British Indian Army

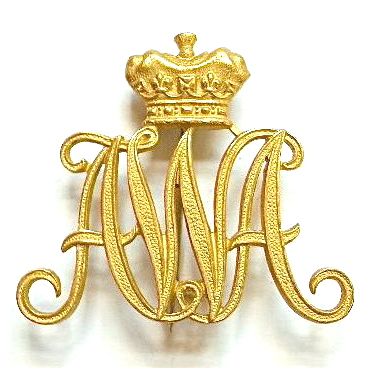
- Active: 1903–1956
- Country: (British Raj) British India (1922–1947); Pakistan (1947–1956)
- Branch: British Indian Army; Pakistan Army
- Type: Infantry
- Size: 2 Battalions
- Uniform: Green; faced red; red trousers
- Engagements: Anglo-Persian War 1856–1857; Taiping Rebellion 1862–1864; Second Afghan War 1878–1880; Anglo-Egyptian War 1882; First World War 1914–1918 (France & Flanders, German East Africa); Third Afghan War 1919; Iraqi Revolt 1920

Commanders
- Colonel-in-Chief: The Duke of Connaught
- Colonel of the Regiment: General Sir Garrett O'Moore Creagh, VC, GCB, GCSI

The 129th Duke of Connaught's Own Baluchis was an infantry regiment of the British Indian Army raised in 1846 as the 2nd Bellochee Battalion. It was designated as the 129th Duke of Connaught's Own Baluchis in 1903, and became 4th Battalion (Duke of Connaught's Own) 10th Baluch Regiment in 1922. In 1947, it was allocated to Pakistan Army, where it continues to exist as 11th Battalion of The Baloch Regiment.

== Early history ==
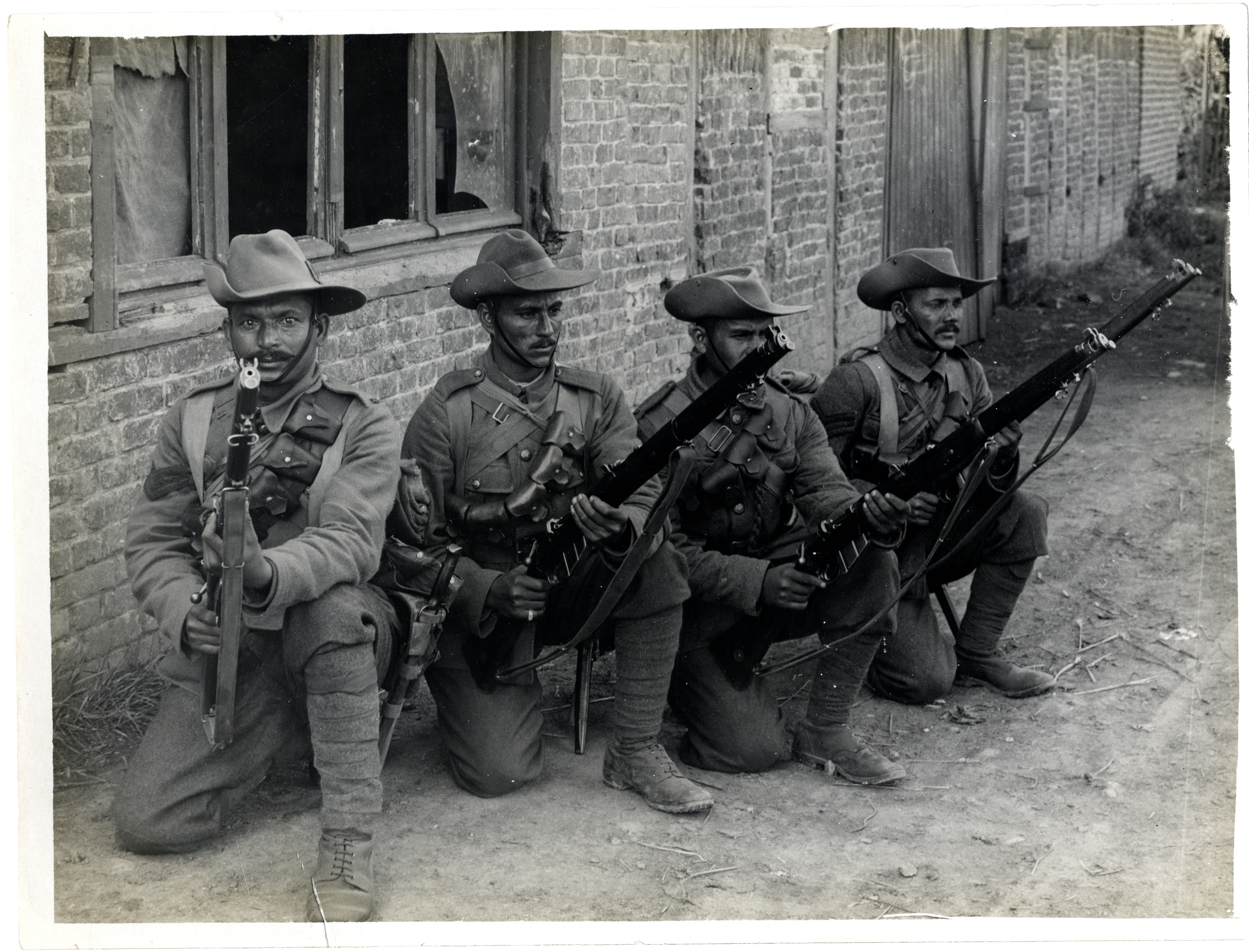
Typical Baluchi riflemen (Estaire-La Bassée Road, France, 1915

The regiment was raised on 6 May 1846 at Karachi on the orders of General Sir Charles Napier, the British Governor of Sindh. Its manpower was mostly drawn from Balochis, Sindhis and Pathans of Sindh. Later, it also recruited Brahuis and Punjabi Muslims, while the recruitment area was extended to include Baluchistan, North-West Frontier Province and the Punjab. In 1856, the battalion was dispatched to Persia and fought in the Anglo-Persian War. In the post-Mutiny realignment, it was brought into line in 1861 and became the 29th Regiment of Bombay Native Infantry or the 2nd Belooch Regiment. In 1862, the regiment went to China to suppress the Taiping Rebellion. Two years later, they became the first foreign troops to be stationed in Japan, when two companies were sent to Yokohama to guard the British legation. In 1878–80, the 2nd Belooch Regiment fought in the Second Afghan War, followed by the Anglo-Egyptian War of 1882. In 1883, the Duke of Connaught was appointed their Colonel-in-Chief.

Subsequent to the reforms brought about in the British Indian Army by Lord Kitchener in 1903, all former Bombay Army units had 100 added to their numbers. Consequently, the regiment's designation was changed to 129th Duke of Connaught's Own Baluchis. In 1912, General Sir Garrett O'Moore Creagh, VC, GCB, GCSI, Commander-in-Chief, British Indian Army was appointed Colonel of the 129th DCO Baluchis. He was a former Commanding Officer of the regiment. The regimental full dress uniform in 1914 included a rifle green turban and kurta (knee length tunic) piped in red, worn with red trousers and white gaiters. The red trousers were a distinctive feature of all five Baluch infantry regiments then serving in the British Indian Army.

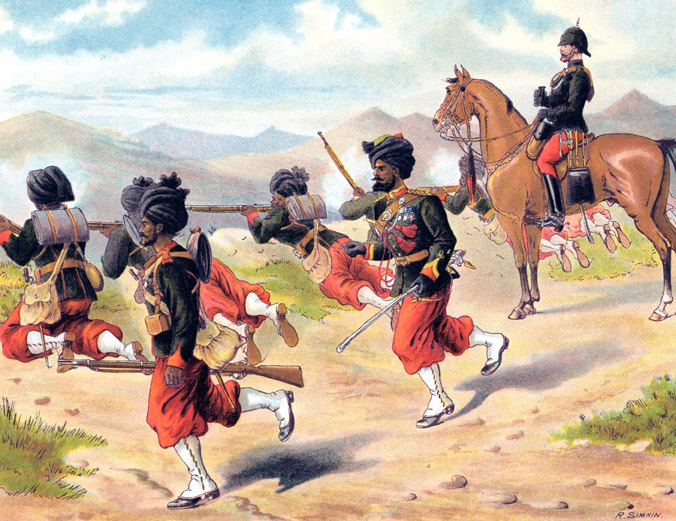
The 29th (Duke of Connaught's Own) Bombay Native Infantry on firing exercise. Coloured lithograph by Richard Simkin, c. 1885.

During the First World War, the 129th DCO Baluchis served on the Western Front in France and Belgium, where they became the first Indian regiment to attack the Germans. At Hollebeke, during the First Battle of Ypres, Sepoy Khudadad Khan became the first Indian to win the Victoria Cross; Britain's highest decoration for valour. The regiment also fought in the Battles of Messines 1914, Armentières 1914, Festubert 1914, Givenchy 1914 and Neuve Chapelle 1915. From France, the regiment proceeded from Marseille to German East Africa and again distinguished itself in the long and difficult campaign. The German commander, General von Lettow-Vorbeck, said of them: "... the 129th Baluchis ... were without a doubt very good". The regiment suffered a staggering 3585 casualties out of the 4447 officers and men, who served with it in the First World War. Out of these casualties 348 died, including 45 attached men from the 127th Baluchi Light Infantry and 6 men from the 124th Baluchis. In 1918, the regiment raised a second battalion. Both 1st & 2nd Battalions 129th Duke of Connaught's Own Baluchis fought in the Third Afghan War of 1919, while the 2nd Battalion also served in Iraq during the Iraqi revolt against the British in 1920. The 2nd Battalion was disbanded in 1922.

== Subsequent history ==
In 1922, the regiment was grouped with five other Baluch battalions: 1st & 2nd Battalions of 124th Duchess of Connaught's Own Baluchistan Infantry, 126th Baluchistan Infantry, 127th Queen Mary's Own Baluch Light Infantry and the 130th King George's Own Baluchis (Jacob's Rifles), to form the 10th Baluch Regiment. The 129th Duke of Connaught's Own Baluchis were designated as the 4th Battalion (Duke of Connaught's Own) 10th Baluch Regiment.

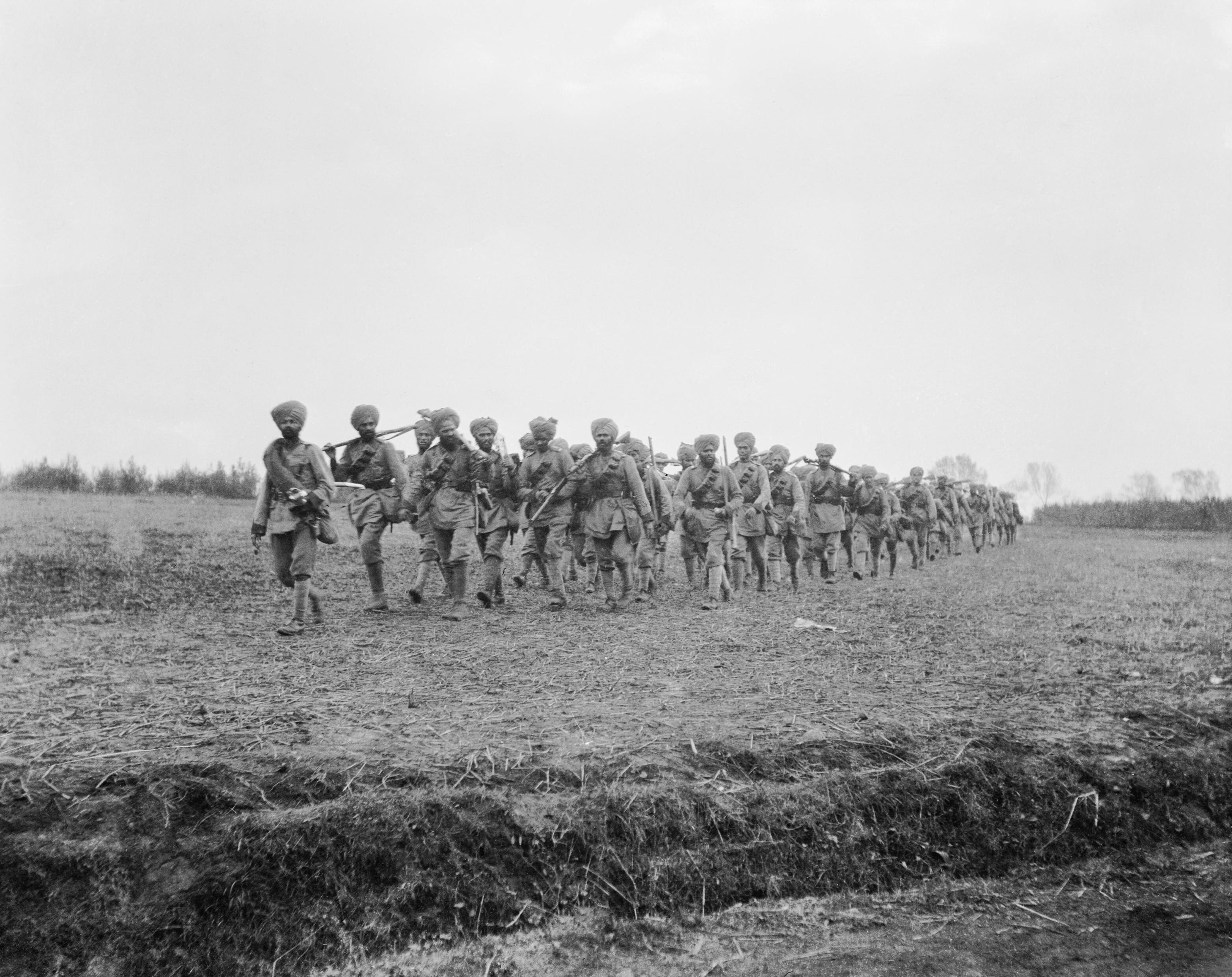
The 129th Duke of Connaught's Own Baluchis near Hollebeke, Belgium, First Battle of Ypres, October 1914

During the Second World War, 4/10th Baluch served in Italian East Africa, North Africa and Italy. The battalion's performance in the war was once again highly commendable. It suffered a total of 1677 casualties and received numerous gallantry awards. On the Partition of India in 1947, the battalion, along with the Baluch Regiment was allocated to Pakistan Army. In the 1948 Indo-Pakistan War, the battalion captured the strategic heights of Pandu in Kashmir. In 1956, on the merger of 8th Punjab and Bahawalpur Regiments with the Baluch Regiment, 4 Baluch was redesignated as 11 Baluch (now 11 Baloch). During the Indo-Pakistani Wars of 1965 and 1971, the battalion fought with distinction in the Lahore and Zafarwal Sectors.

== Genealogy ==
- 1846 2nd Bellochee Battalion
- 1858 2nd Belooch Extra Battalion Bombay Native Infantry
- 1859 2nd Belooch Regiment Bombay Native Infantry
- 1861 29th Regiment Bombay Native Infantry or 2nd Belooch Regiment
- 1883 29th (Duke of Connaught's Own) Regiment Bombay Native Infantry or 2nd Belooch Regiment
- 1885 29th (Duke of Connaught's Own) Regiment Bombay Infantry or 2nd Belooch Regiment
- 1888 29th (Duke of Connaught's Own) Regiment (2nd Belooch Battalion) Bombay Infantry
- 1892 29th (Duke of Connaught's Own) Regiment (2nd Baluch Battalion) Bombay Infantry or 29th Baluchis

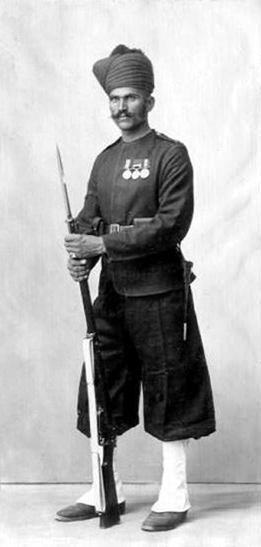
Lance Naik Ghulam Haider, 129th Duke of Connaught's Own Baluchis, 1911

- 1901 29th (Duke of Connaught's Own) Baluch Infantry
- 1903 129th Duke of Connaught's Own Baluchis
- 1917 1st Battalion 129th Duke of Connaught's Own Baluchis
- 1922 129th Duke of Connaught's Own Baluchis
- 1922 4th Battalion (Duke of Connaught's Own) 10th Baluch Regiment or 4/10th Baluch
- 1945 4th Battalion (Duke of Connaught's Own) The Baluch Regiment or 4 Baluch
- 1956 11th Battalion The Baluch Regiment or 11 Baluch
- 1991 11th Battalion The Baloch Regiment or 11 Baloch

== Uniforms ==
Throughout its existence as a separate regiment the 129th Baluchis wore a full dress comprising dark green turban and tunic, the latter with red facings. Trousers were red and cut wide in "knickerbocker" style. Gaiters were white and equipment of brown leather. British officers wore green tunics of rifle regiment pattern with silver ornamented pouch-belts and red trousers. Khaki drill field service uniforms were introduced about 1880 and replaced the green and red for most occasions after 1914.

== See also ==
- 10th Baluch Regiment
- The Baloch Regiment
- Sepoy Khudadad Khan, VC
