= Kaizad Maneck Sopariwala =

Pakistani Army officer

Major General Kaizad Maneck Sopariwala
- Born: February 18, 1953; Karachi, Pakistan
- Allegiance: Pakistan
- Branch: Pakistan Army
- Service years: 1974 - 2011
- Rank: Major General
- Awards: Hilal-e-Imtiaz (Military)
- Alma mater: United States Army Command and General Staff College

Kaizad Maneck Sopariwala was a Pakistani Army officer. He was the first Pakistani Parsi who became a Major General in the Pakistan Army.

== Military career ==
He passed from the PMA Long Course in 1974 and was commissioned into the 12 Baloch. He served as a Platoon Leader, Company 2 i/c, Company Commander (1978–1981, 1982–1983), Instructor in the Baloch Regimental Centre (1981–1982), Battalion 2 i/c and Brigade Major (1984–1986). He graduated in 1986 from the United States Army Command and General Staff College. From 1986 to 1988 he was posted on the staff of the Quartermaster General Branch of XI Corps. Promoted to Lieutenant Colonel in 1988, he was posted as an instructor in National Defence University (Pakistan). Between 1992 and 1995, he commanded the 12th Battalion of the Baloch Regiment. He was promoted to Colonel in 1995 and posted as commander of a Mechanized Infantry Battalion. In 1997, he was posted in the Directorate General of Military Operations. In 2000, he was posted as Colonel General Staff of the FCNA, Gilgit. In 2001, he was promoted to Brigadier and as Commandant of the Baloch Regimental Centre. In 2003, he was appointed as Brigadier General Staff, XI Corps. In 2006, he was appointed as GOC, 27th Infantry Brigade under the Peshawar Division until 2008. He was promoted to Major General in 2008 and appointed as Deputy Commandant of PMA Kakul. In 2010 he was appointed as GOC, 6th Armoured Division, and retired in 2011.

In 2002, he received the Hilal-e-Imtiaz award.

== In literature ==
In Agha H Amins' book, Pakistan Army Infantry Battalion Performance in the 1948 Kashmir War - A summary, Agha uses Sopariwala as a source for the number of casualties the Baloch regiment suffered during the war.

He states that Sopariwala (metaphorically) "entered the arena like an angel and was crucial in helping me gather the final part of the puzzle i.e Baluch Regiment casualties in this war."
