= Sindh Regiment =

Pakistan Army regiment

- Sindhi: سنڌ ريجمينٽ; Urdu: سندھ رجمنٹ)
- Insignia of Sindh Regiment
- Founded: 1980
- Country: Pakistan
- Branch: Pakistan Army
- Role: infantry
- Size: 34 battalions
- Regimental centre: Hyderabad, Sindh
- Battle honours: Kargil War

Commanders
- Colonel-in-chief: General Nadeem Raza
- Colonel commandant: Lt General Sahir Shamshad Mirza

The Sindh Regiment (previously Sind Regiment; Sindhi: سنڌ ريجمينٽ, Urdu: سندھ رجمنٹ) is an infantry regiment of the Pakistan Army established on 1 July 1980. The regiment takes its name from Sindh province in southern Pakistan. Prior to its formation there had been no regiment in the Pakistan Army specifically intended to recruit primarily from the Sindhi population. The regimental centre is located in Hyderabad, Sindh, Pakistan.

== History ==
Since independence in 1947, the Pakistan Army had been dominated by Punjabis, with as much as 77% of army personnel. A specific regiment was created to address concerns of underrepresentation of Sindhis. This was done by the transfer of eleven battalions from the Punjab Regiment and ten battalions from the Baloch Regiment. An additional seven battalions were raised in the period from 1988 to 1999 while another Baluch battalion was transferred in 1988. Further raisings between 2001 and 2019 brought total strength of the regiment to 34 battalions.

== Uniform ==
The regimental badge depicts crossed Sindhi axes surmounted by the star and crescent appearing above a title scroll in Urdu. All ranks wear a cherry pink beret with a red plume hackle.

== Commanders ==
Previous colonel-commandants of the regiment have included Lieutenant General Salim Haider, who has served as the commander of I (Strike) Corps, Mangla, and as the Master-General of Ordnance (MGO). At present, Fayyaz Hussain Shah is serving as the Colonel-Commadant of the regiment. Sahir Shamshad Mirza is the Colonel-in-Chief of the regiment.

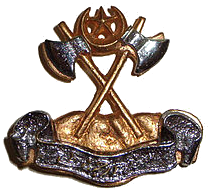
Regimental cap badge

== Battle honours ==
The following battle honours are a representation of honours awarded to the battalions which form the regiment.

- Kargil War: 24th Battalion, Sindh Regiment participated in the War and Sepoy Fazl Aman was taken POW in the war and later repatriated.

Operational awards to individual members of the regiment include:

- 1 Nishan-e-Haider (posthumously to Karnal Sher Khan for actions in the Kargil War of 1999).
- 6 Sitara-e-Jurat
- 12 Tamgha-i-Jurat (including four for actions in the Kargil War)

Non-operational awards include:

- 6 Sitara-e-Basalat
- 28 Tamgha-e-Basalat

== Units ==
- 1 SIND (MIB)(Fakher E Sind)
- 2 SIND (Ath-o-Ath)
- 3 SIND (Athra)
- 4 SIND (Sarmast)
- 5 SIND (Al Bat'l)
- 6 SIND (Qalandars)
- 7 SIND (The Champions)(Jafakash)(SABUNA 71)
- 8 SIND (Al Shawaz)
- 9 SIND (MIB)(Saifans)(Saifullah)
- 10 SIND (Terrific Ten)
- 11 SIND (Tabbaar)
- 12 SIND (Jang Ju Bara)
- 13 SIND (Zarb E Qasim)
- 14 SIND (Rawan Dawan)
- 15 SIND (Al Fateh)
- 16 SIND (MIB)(First MIB) (Al Karrar)
- 17 SIND
- 18 SIND (Yakjan)
- 19 SIND (Sarbuland)
- 20 SIND (Toofani Battalion)
- 21 SIND (Dosh Badosh)
- 22 SIND (MIB)(Daleer Battalion)
- 23 SIND (Sholazan)
- 24 SIND (1988)(MIB)(Lajpal Battalion) (First on Himalayas)
- 25 SIND (Al Kaseeb)
- 26 SIND (Janbaz Battalion)
- 27 SIND (NH)(Sataees)(Sher Haideri)
- 28 SIND (Ghaurians)
- 29 SIND (Jeedar)
- 30 SIND
- 31 SIND
- 32 SIND (2015)(Al Masada)(Den Of Lions)
- 33 SIND (Al Masur)
- 34 SIND (Al Rasoob)

Affiliated units

- 5 Light Commando Battalion (Sindh)
- 40th Horse (Sind) armoured regiment

== Alliances ==
- 1st Battalion with British Army – The Rifles

== Notable personnel ==
- Muhammad Qamar Abbas Rizvi, former officer, current member of Sindh Provincial Assembly.
