= Qamar Abbas Rizvi =

Pakistani politician

Muhammad Qamar Abbas Rizvi

Member of the Provincial Assembly of Sindh
- In office June 2016 – 28 May 2018

Personal details
- Born: 1 July 1961 (age 64) Karachi, Sindh, Pakistan

Muhammad Qamar Abbas Rizvi (born 1 July 1961) is a Pakistani politician who had been a Member of the Provincial Assembly of Sindh from June 2016 to May 2018.

== Early life and education ==
He was born on 1 July 1961 in Karachi. He served as an Army officer in the Sindh Regiment until 2005,

He has a degree of Bachelor of Arts and a degree of Master of Arts, both from Karachi University.

He also has a Master of Business Administration degree from Preston University.

== Political career ==
He was elected to the Provincial Assembly of Sindh as a candidate of Mutahida Quami Movement from Constituency PS-117 KARACHI-XXIX in by-polls held in June 2016.
