= Mahmood Khan Durrani =

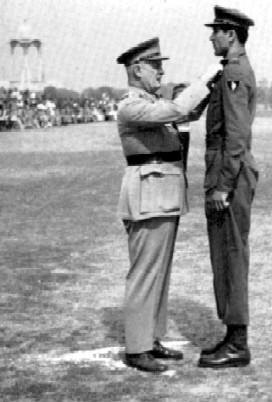
- Captain MK Durrani receiving the George Cross from the Viceroy Field Marshal Wavell, 1946.
- Born: 1 July 1914; Multan, British India
- Died: 20 August 1995 (aged 81); Multan, Pakistan
- Spouse: Shahzadi Naheed Durrani
- Military career
- Allegiance: State of Bahawalpur; British India; Pakistan
- Branch: Bahawalpur State Forces; British Indian Army; Pakistan Army
- Service years: 1932–1971
- Rank: Lieutenant colonel
- Units: 1st Bahawalpur Infantry, 16th Baloch Regiment
- Commands: 1st Bahawalpur Infantry (1946–1947)
- Conflicts: Second World War
- Awards: George Cross; Mentioned in Despatches
- Other work: Writer and poet

Lieutenant Colonel Mahmood Khan Durrani, GC (1 July 1914 – 20 August 1995) was a Pakistani soldier and a recipient of the George Cross, awarded for heroism in circumstances of extreme danger. He was a 26-year-old captain serving in the 1st Bahawalpur Infantry, British Indian Army (now 8th Battalion The Baloch Regiment of Pakistan Army) in Malaya during the Second World War, when he was awarded the medal for heroism while a prisoner of war of the Japanese Army.

Mahmood Khan Durrani belonged to the Saddozai Tribe, Old Royal Durrani Family of Afghanistan. He was born on 1 July 1914 in Multan in the Western Punjab. After completing his schooling, he joined the army of Bahawalpur State. When the Second World War broke out, he accompanied his battalion, which was dispatched to North Malaya in March 1941, in anticipation of the looming war with Japan.

== Details ==
During the British retreat in Malaya following the Japanese invasion in December 1941, Captain Mahmood Khan Durrani and a small party of soldiers managed to evade capture for three months before their location was betrayed to the Japanese sponsored Indian National Army (INA). He refused to co-operate with the INA and actively worked to thwart their political and military aims, for which he was subjected to severe torture and mistreatment, which left his health permanently affected.

=== Citation ===
"The KING has been graciously pleased to approve the award of the GEORGE CROSS, in recognition of most conspicuous gallantry in carrying out hazardous work in a very brave manner"

Captain MAHMOOD KHAN DURRANI, 1st Bahawalpur Infantry, Indian States Forces.

=== Account of Deed ===
For outstanding courage, loyalty and fortitude whilst a prisoner-of-war.

With a small party he was cut off during the withdrawal in Malaya. They succeeded in remaining free in hiding for three months until betrayal, when they were arrested and confined. Refusing to join the I.N.A this officer devoted himself to rendering valuable service. He then conceived and put into execution, a plan for thwarting the Japanese plans for infiltrating agents into India. After many delays and set backs due to falling under suspicion he ultimately achieved much of his objective. Presumably as a result of the suspicion that he had been responsible for the failure of their plans, he was arrested by the Japanese. For ten days he was subjected to third degree methods including starvation, deprivation of sleep and physical torture such as the application of burning cigarettes to his legs. Subsequently he was given a mock trial and condemned to death but the execution was postponed in order that information should be extracted. He was then tortured by various particularly brutal methods continuously for several days. The exact time is uncertain as there were periods of unconsciousness, but it was certainly lasted for some days. No information whatever was obtained from him. Thereafter he was kept in solitary confinement for several months, with occasional interrogations and was given little medical treatment and just enough food to sustain life.

When finally liberated he was found to be permanently affected in health and still bears the marks of physical torture. He will never be the same again. Throughout he was fully aware of the possible consequences of his actions and, when discovered, he preferred to undergo protracted and cruel torture rather than confess his plans and save himself, because he still hoped that he might achieve his purpose. To confess would have endangered others' lives and might have influenced the enemy to change their plans.

His outstanding example of deliberate cold-blooded bravery is most fully deserving of the highest award.

Captain Durrani was presented with his George Cross by Field Marshal Lord Wavell in 1946 at a special investiture ceremony held at the Red Fort, Delhi.

After his repatriation, Durrani resumed his military career and on partition of India in 1947, he opted for Pakistan. He continued to serve in the Pakistan Army, retiring in 1971 as a lieutenant colonel.

A poet and noted writer, he died on 20 August 1995, aged 81 years old. His autobiography, The Sixth Column, was published in the UK in 1955.

The only George Cross recipient to have survived Japanese captivity, Durrani was one of the first George Cross Committee members of the Victoria Cross and George Cross Association. His George Cross is on display in the Imperial War Museum's Victoria & George Cross Gallery.
