= 130th Baluchis =

130th (King George's Own) Baluchis (Jacob's Rifles)
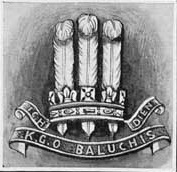
- Active: 1903–1922
- Country: (British Raj) British India
- Branch: British Indian Army
- Type: Infantry
- Size: 2 Battalions
- Uniform: Drab faced drab in 1858; Green faced red; red trousers in 1881.
- Engagements: Second Afghan War; Boxer Rebellion; First World War (German East Africa); Palestine)

Commanders
- Colonel-in-Chief: George V

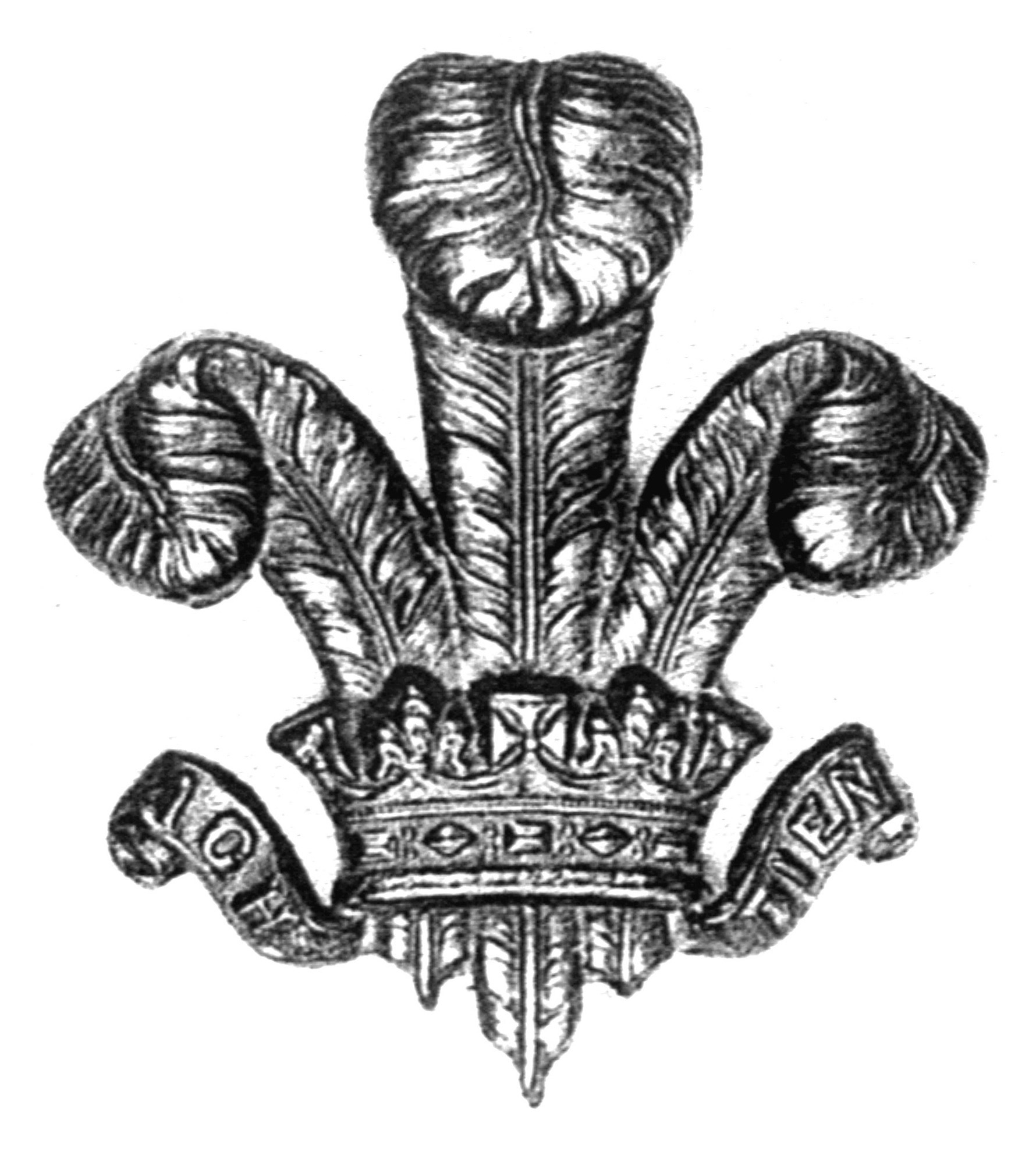
130th (King George's Own) Baluchis

The 130th (King George's Own) Baluchis (Jacob's Rifles) was an infantry regiment of the British Indian Army raised in June 1858 as the 1st Belooch Rifles; re-designated as 1st Regiment Jacob's Rifles in September. It was designated as 130th Jacob's Baluchis in 1903 becoming 5th Battalion (King George's Own) 10th Baluch Regiment (Jacob's Rifles) in 1922. In 1947, it was allotted to Pakistan Army, where it continues to exist as 12th Battalion of The Baloch Regiment.

== Early history ==
In 1858, Major John Jacob raised two local 'silladar' infantry battalions known as Belooch Rifles (re-designated as Jacob's Rifles soon after); the only silladar infantry to have existed in the Indian Army. These battalions soon earned a formidable reputation in and around Jacobabad for keeping the peace on the Sindh frontier as part of the Sind Frontier Field Force. In 1861, the first of these was accorded regular status, becoming the 30th Regiment of Bombay Native Infantry or Jacob's Rifles, while the second was disbanded. The regiment fought in the Second Afghan War of 1878–80 and suffered heavy casualties at the Battle of Maiwand. In 1881, it was reconstituted as a Baluch battalion and re-designated as the 30th Regiment (Jacob's) Bombay Native Infantry or 3rd Belooch Regiment. In 1900, it was sent to China to suppress the Boxer Rebellion.

== 130th (King George's Own) Baluchis (Jacob's Rifles) ==
Subsequent to the reforms brought about in the Indian Army by Lord Kitchener in 1903, all former Bombay Army units had 100 added to their numbers, and the regiment's designation was changed to 130th Jacob's Baluchis. In 1906, the Prince of Wales (later George V) was appointed Colonel-in-Chief of the regiment. The regimental full dress uniform in 1914 included a rifle green turban and kurta (knee length tunic) piped in red, worn with red trousers and white gaiters. The red trousers were a distinctive feature of all five Baluch infantry regiments then serving in the Indian Army. During the First World War the regiment served in German East Africa and Palestine. In 1918 it raised a second battalion, which was disbanded in 1920.

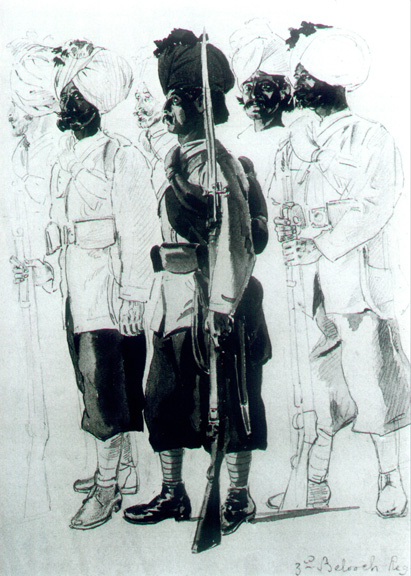
30th Regiment (3rd Belooch Battalion) Bombay Infantry. Watercolour by AC Lovett 1890.

== Subsequent History ==
In 1922, the regiment was grouped with the five other Baluch battalions: 1st & 2nd Battalions of 124th Duchess of Connaught's Own Baluchistan Infantry, 126th Baluchistan Infantry, 127th Queen Mary's Own Baluch Light Infantry and the 129th Duke of Connaught's Own Baluchis, to form the 10th Baluch Regiment. The regiment's new designation was 5th Battalion (King George's Own) 10th Baluch Regiment (Jacob's Rifles). During the Second World War, 5/10th Baluch served in Burma Campaign. The battalion's performance in the war was highly commendable. It suffered a total of 575 casualties and received a number of gallantry awards. On the Partition of India in 1947, the battalion, along with the Baluch Regiment was allocated to Pakistan Army. In 1956, the 8th Punjab and Bahawalpur Regiments were merged with the Baluch Regiment and 5 Baluch was redesignated as 12 Baluch (now 12 Baloch). During the Indo-Pakistani War of 1965, the battalion fought in the Kasur Sector.

== Genealogy ==
- 1858 1st Belooch Rifles
- 1858 1st Regiment Jacob's Rifles
- 1861 Jacob's Rifles
- 1861 30th Regiment Bombay Native Infantry or Jacob's Rifles
- 1881 30th Regiment (Jacob's) Bombay Native Infantry or 3rd Belooch Regiment
- 1885 30th Regiment (Jacob's) Bombay Infantry or 3rd Belooch Regiment
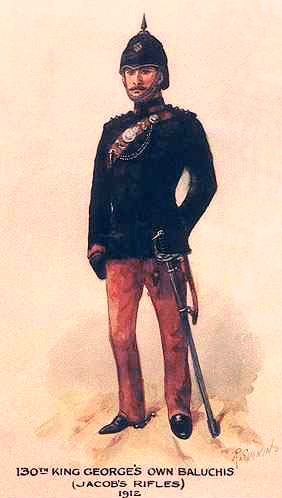
  Officer of 130th (King George's Own) Baluchis (Jacob's Rifles). Watercolour by Richard Simkin 1912.
- 1888 30th Regiment (3rd Belooch Battalion) Bombay Infantry
- 1892 30th Regiment (3rd Baluch Battalion) Bombay Infantry or 30th Baluchis
- 1901 30th Baluch Infantry
- 1903 130th Jacob's Baluchis
- 1906 130th Prince of Wales's Own Baluchis
- 1910 130th Prince of Wales's Own Baluchis (Jacob's Rifles)
- 1910 130th (King George's Own) Baluchis (Jacob's Rifles)
- 1918 1st Battalion 130th (King George's Own) Baluchis (Jacob's Rifles)
- 1920 130th (King George's Own) Baluchis (Jacob's Rifles)
- 1922 5th Battalion (King George's Own) 10th Baluch Regiment (Jacob's Rifles) or 5/10th Baluch
- 1937 5th Battalion (King George V's Own) 10th Baluch Regiment (Jacob's Rifles)
- 1945 5th Battalion (King George V's Own) The Baluch Regiment (Jacob's Rifles) or 5 Baluch
- 1956 12th Battalion The Baluch Regiment or 12 Baluch
- 1991 12th Battalion The Baloch Regiment or 12 Baloch
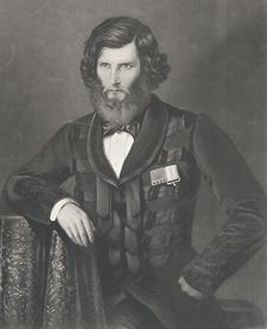
  Brigadier General John Jacob (1812–1858).

== See also ==
- 10th Baluch Regiment
- The Baloch Regiment
- Brigadier General John Jacob, CB
