= Abrar Hussain (general) =

Pakistani general

Abrar Husain HJ MBE
- ابرار حسین
- Official military portrait

Commandant Staff College, Quetta
- In office August 1967 – May 1968
- Preceded by: Akhtar Hussain Malik
- Succeeded by: Muhammad Shariff

Personal details
- Born: 2 September 1918 Lucknow, British India
- Died: 15 March 1992 (aged 73) Rawalpindi, Pakistan
- Education: La Martinière College, Lucknow; Allahabad University; Indian Military Academy; Staff College, Quetta
- Awards: See list

Military service
- Branch/service: British Indian Army (1940-1945); Pakistan Army (1947-1968)
- Years of service: 1940–1968
- Rank: Major General
- Unit: 2/10th Baluch (now 7 Baloch)
- Commands: 17 Baluch Regt (now 19 Baluch); 6th Armoured Division (Pakistan); Staff College, Quetta
- Battles/wars: World War II; Malayan Campaign; Indo-Pakistan War of 1965; Battle of Chawinda

Abrar Husain (Note: Urdu: ابرار حسین) HJ MBE (2 September 1918 – 15 March 1992) was a Pakistani senior army officer and author who served in World War II and the Indo-Pakistani War of 1965.

== Early life and education ==
Abrar Husain was born on 2 September 1918 in a Taluqdar family of Oudh. He was educated at La Martinière College, Lucknow and Colvin Taluqdars' College where he excelled in both academics and sports.

His personal conduct and character led the College Principal to declare him as: "the best boy who has passed through my hands in 10 years."

In 1939, he graduated in history, political science and English literature from Allahabad University. On the outbreak of World War II, he joined the Indian Military Academy at Dehradun and was commissioned into the British Indian Army on 31 July 1940 and posted to 2nd Battalion of 10th Baluch Regiment (now 7 Baloch).

His brother, Brigadier Noor Ahmad Husain, served as an aide-de-camp (ADC) to Muhammad Ali Jinnah.

== Service years ==
=== British Indian Army ===
==== World War II ====
In October 1940, the 2/10th Baluch was dispatched to British Malaya in anticipation of the impending war with Japan. On 8 December 1941, Japan invaded Malaya and rapidly overran the British forces, who surrendered on Singapore Island on 15 February 1942. Among the Allied Prisoners of War was 2/10th Baluch, who had given an excellent account of themselves despite the Allied defeat. The Japanese separated Indian officers and men from the British and subjected them to intense propaganda and pressure to join the Japanese-sponsored 'Indian National Army' (INA). The Baluchis mostly stood firm. Prominent among them was Lieutenant Abrar Hussain, who refused to betray his Honour. The Japanese sent him along with 150 recalcitrant Gurkhas for use as coastal mine-breaching suicide troops on successive island landings. After three such landings, the group arrived on the island of New Britain in the South Pacific, where they were used for building airstrips. Led by their gallant commander, the group remained defiant despite severe privations and cruelty of their Japanese captors.

By 1945, the Allies had severely disrupted Japanese communications in the South Pacific resulting in starvation among the Japanese, who reportedly had turned to cannibalism. Lieutenant Abrar not only managed to survive, but also demanded and received the surrender of the thousand-strong Japanese garrison.

In December 1945, an Australian force arrived in New Britain and were astonished to find it in Allied hands, even if the commander and his men were skeletons in rags, carrying Japanese weapons.

For his exemplary conduct, personal bravery and strength of character, Lieutenant Abrar Hussain was appointed Member of the Order of the British Empire (MBE).

=== Pakistan Army ===
On the independence of Pakistan in 1947, Abrar Hussain opted for Pakistan. He joined 2/10th Baluch as a Second Lieutenant. In 1949, he graduated from the Command and Staff College Quetta. His varied appointments in Pakistan Army included Commander of 17 Baluch (now 19 Baloch), instructor at Staff College and Staff appointments at GHQ, Deputy Director Military Operations, Deputy Director Staff Duties and then Director Staff Duties. Here, he was directly involved from 1955 to 1958 in the induction of US military equipment for modernisation of four infantries and one and a half armoured divisions.

He was promoted to Brigadier in 1956. As Military Secretary from 1958 to 1964, he was also President of the Army Reforms Committee. Promoted to Major General in 1964, he was given the task of converting 100 (Independent) Armoured Brigade Group into the 6 Armoured Division. The fact that he was an infantry officer and yet had been entrusted with the raising of an armoured formation, speaks volumes of the esteem in which he was held by the Army High Command. He would soon vindicate that confidence in the coming war with India. The 6 Armoured Division was still a paper formation without a division's normal complement of fighting or supporting elements. There were only two armoured regiments and one infantry battalion, while there were no integral brigade headquarters in the division.

The main thrust of the Indian offensive was in the Sialkot Sector, where they attacked with three infantry and one armoured divisions. Facing them was the overstretched 15 Infantry Division. As enemy intentions became clear, and he made inroads towards Chawinda, 6 Armoured Division was inducted into the battle. The 24 Infantry Brigade was provided to General Abrar, and with these meagre resources, he was ordered stop the enemy. For some time, the situation for Pakistan was critical. It was here that his strength of character, calmness and indomitable spirit provided the inspiration to his outnumbered and outgunned troops, who stood firm in the face of overwhelming odds. Some of the fiercest tank battles since World War II were fought on the Battlefield of Chawinda but every attempt by the Indians to breakthrough was foiled. In the words of General KM Arif, who was then a staff officer in 6 Armoured Division:

The Battle of Chawinda produced moments of extreme anxiety and pressure. General Abrar remained composed during the battle, never losing sense of balance and cool nerves. On three occasions when some others got adversely affected, he stood firm and provided leadership of high quality. On 11 September, the enemy attacked the Chawinda defences held by a weak force which had taken over the responsibility only hours earlier. The attackers and defenders suffered considerable losses in the encounter. This was the worst situation faced by 6 Armoured Division in the war. Inspiring the division from the front, Abrar went to the critical part of the frontline, relieved the force with an infantry brigade and stabilised the situation before returning to his Headquarters.

By 22 September, the war would end in ceasefire. Major General Abrar Hussain and his 'Men of Steel' had saved the day for Pakistan. For his inspiring leadership and skillful conduct of operations, he was awarded the Hilal-i-Jur'at. He remains one of Pakistan's most successful field commanders. In 1968, General Abrar was commanding the Command and Staff College in Quetta when he asked for early retirement due to some irreconcilable differences with the GHQ. Typical of him, he never complained or uttered any grievances.

== Death ==
On 16 April 1975 General Abrar suffered a stroke which paralysed the right side of his body and impeded his speech. He endured the affliction for seventeen years until his death on 15 March 1992.

== Authorship ==
- Men of Steel: 6th Armoured Division in the 1965 War, Oxford University Press Pakistan, 2005, ISBN 969-8125-19-1

== Awards and decorations ==
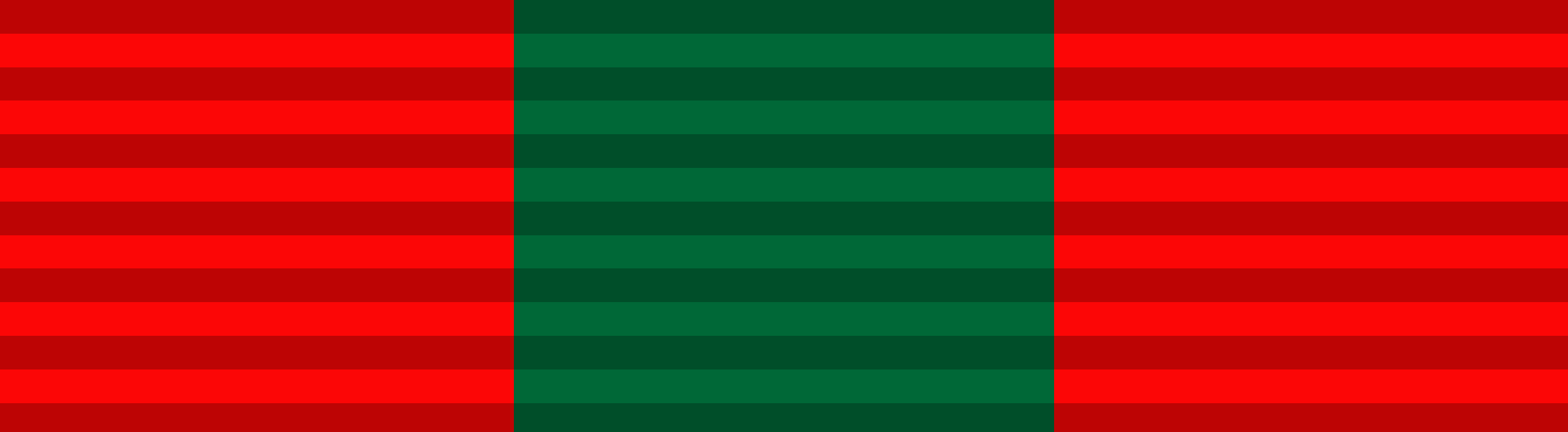

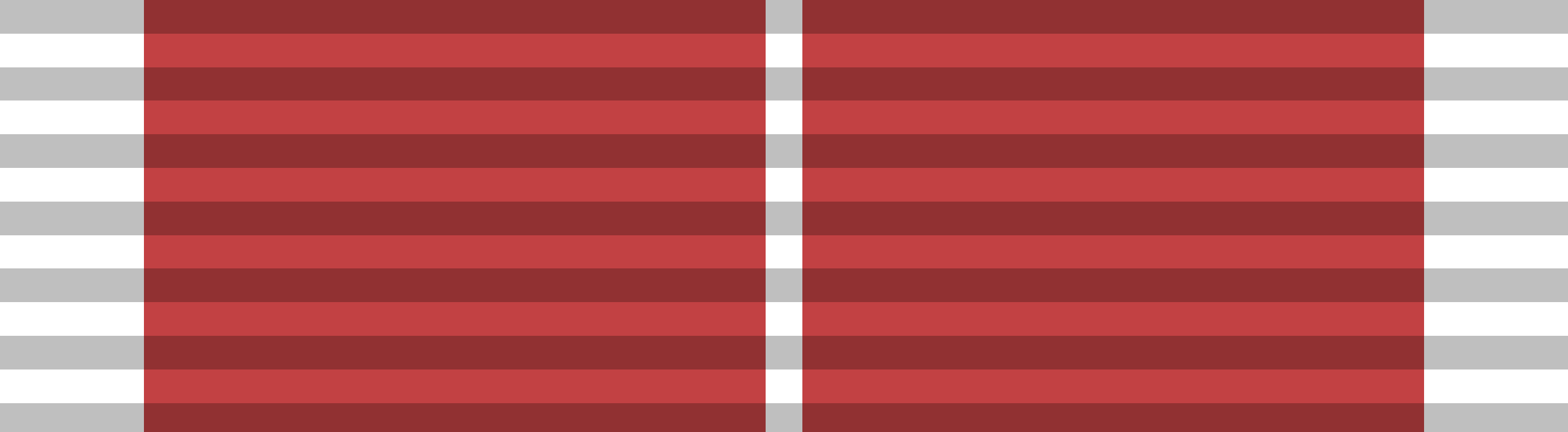

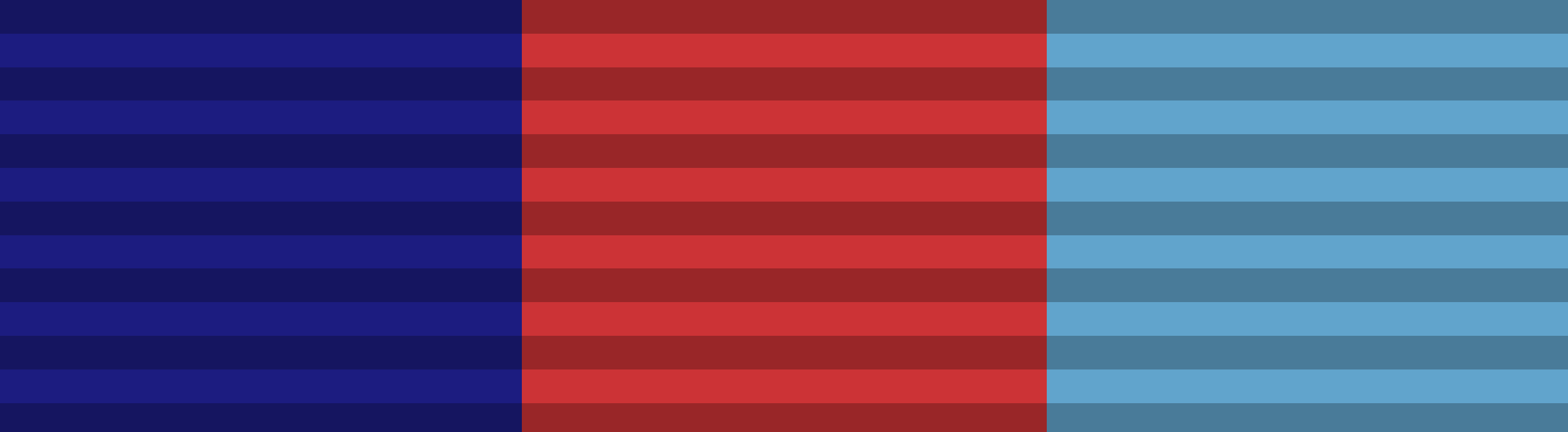

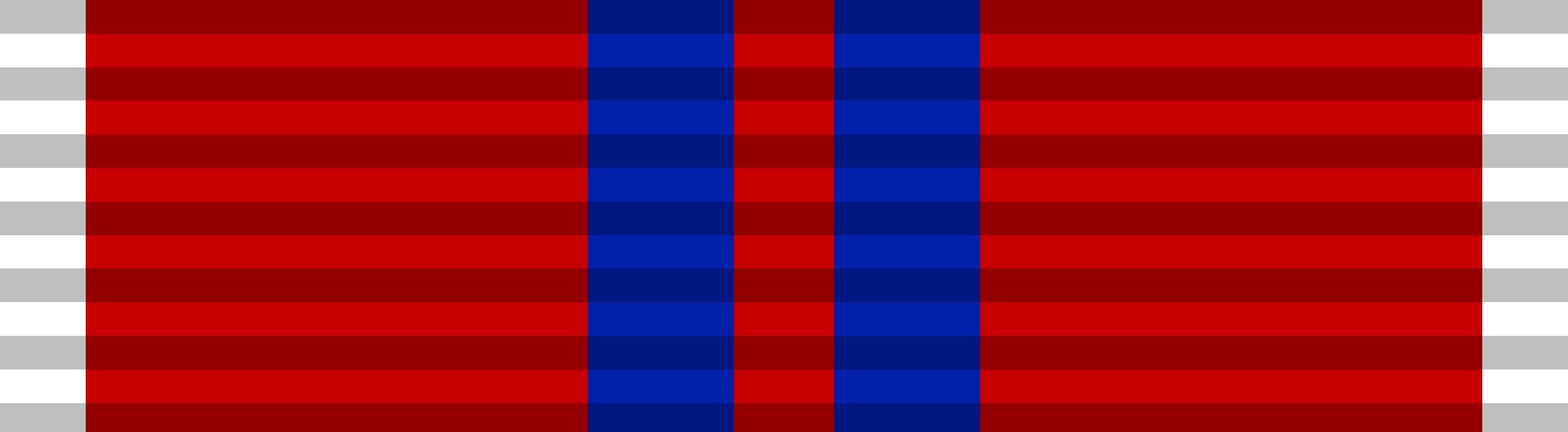

Hilal-i-Jurat (Crescent of Courage) 1965 War	Sitara-e-Harb 1965 War (War Star 1965)		Tamgha-e-Jang 1965 War (War Medal 1965)
Pakistan Medal 1947	Tamgha-e-Qayam-e-Jamhuria (Republic Commemoration Medal) 1956	Member of the Order of the British Empire (MBE)	1939-1945 Star
Pacific Star (with Burma Clasp Rosette)	Defence Medal	War Medal 1939–1945	Queen Elizabeth II Coronation Medal (1953)

=== Foreign decorations ===
Foreign Awards
UK	Member of the Order of the British Empire
UK	1939-1945 Star
UK	Pacific Star
UK	Defence Medal
UK	War Medal 1939-1945
UK	Queen Elizabeth II Coronation Medal
