= French gray =

Color coordinates
- Hex triplet: #BEBFC5
- sRGB^{B} (r, g, b): (190, 191, 197)
- HSV (h, s, v): (231°, 4%, 77%)
- CIELCh_{uv} (L, C, h): (77, 5, 260°)
- Source: HTML/CSS
- ISCC–NBS descriptor: Light bluish gray
- B: Normalized to [0–255] (byte)

French gray is a color in the color spectrum. It traditionally has a slightly cooler, more blue tone than simple gray.

During the period between 1880 to 1910 the color french grey was very commonly used in “non-decorative housepaints used on wood or plaster substrates."
