= Bahawalpur Regiment =

The Bahawalpur Regiment
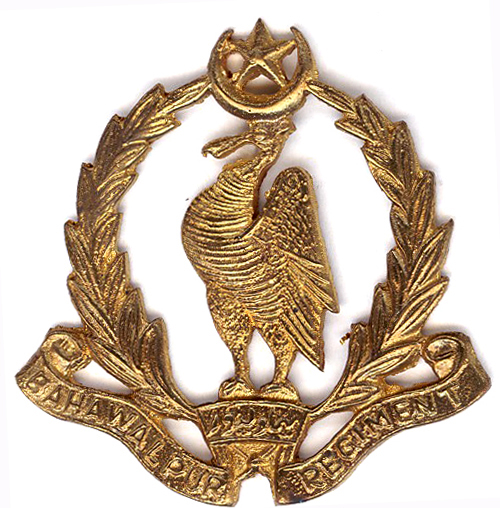
- Active: 1952–1956
- Country: Pakistan
- Branch: Bahawalpur State Forces; Pakistan Army
- Type: Line Infantry
- Role: Standard Infantry
- Size: 4 Battalions
- Regimental Centre: Dera Nawab Sahib
- Uniform: Rifle green; faced scarlet
- Engagements: Second Sikh War 1848; Indian Rebellion of 1857; Second Afghan War 1878-80; First World War 1914-18 (Egypt, Palestine); Third Afghan War 1919; Second World War 1939-45 (Malaya)

The Bahawalpur Regiment was a regiment of Pakistan Army. The regiment was formed in 1952 from the infantry battalions of the erstwhile Princely State of Bahawalpur, which had acceded to Pakistan in 1947. In 1956, the Bahawalpur Regiment was merged with the Pakistan Army ( 4 battalions of infantry merged with Baloch Regiment, elements of artillery with 14 Field Regiment while Armour elements with 19 lancers)

== The Bahawalpur State Forces ==
Bahawalpur was a semi-autonomous Princely State within British Raj, lying along the left bank of the River Sutlej in what now comprises southwestern Punjab Province. At the time of independence in 1947, it acceded to Pakistan. The two senior battalions of Bahawalpur Regiment trace their origin to 1827, when the Nawab of Bahawalpur first organized his forces. In 1848, Bahawalpur State actively supported the British war effort during the Second Anglo-Sikh War with 7000 infantry and 2500 cavalry, who were engaged in operations near Multan. During the Great Indian Rebellion of 1857, Bahawalpur State troops aided the British "in quelling mutinies in Oudh, a Bahawalpur contingent of 1000 men occupying Sirsa and maintaining quiet in the district." During the Second Afghan War of 1878–80, “Five hundred men of the State Infantry and 100 sowars were stationed at Dera Ghazi Khan and did useful service in strengthening the frontier posts vacated by regular regiments.” In 1889, Bahawalpur State Forces were accepted as Imperial Service Troops, and a small force of cavalry and infantry was placed at the disposal of the British for use in emergencies. However, in 1901, the force was disbanded and in its place, Bahawalpur raised a camel baggage train with an escort of mounted infantry, called the Bahawalpur Imperial Service Mounted Rifles and Camel Transport Corps, which would go on to become the 1st Bahawalpur Sadiq Battalion in 1924. In 1912, the colour of their uniform was khaki with green facings.

=== The First World War ===
During the First World War, Bahawalpur State Forces served in Egypt, Palestine, East Africa, Mesopotamia, Baluchistan and the North-West Frontier Province.

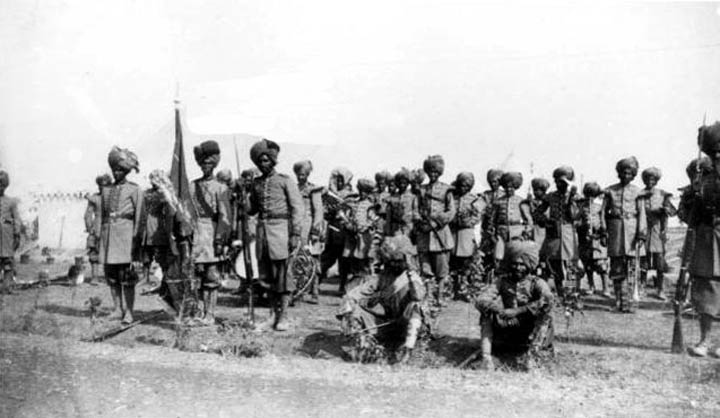
Bahawalpur Infantry, Delhi, 1903.

A detachment of 73 men from the Bahawalpur Mounted Rifles was sent to Egypt as reinforcement for the Alwar State Infantry Battalion with whom it served throughout the war; except briefly in 1915, when it served with the Bikaner Camel Corps. In February 1915, Turkey launched an attack on Suez Canal from Palestine. The detachment of Bahawalpur Mounted Rifles took part in reconnaissance of the Turkish advance and then pursuit of the retreating Turks after their attack was repulsed. It then served on line of communication during the British advance into Palestine, in the Third Battle of Gaza and the Battle of Megiddo, which resulted in Turkish defeat. In Palestine, it operated in the Jordan Valley and took part in the capture of Amman. Meanwhile, the rest of the Camel Corps was dispatched to the Persian Gulf in November 1914 in support of the Indian Expeditionary Force. However, the detachment soon returned, as the camels were no longer required. In February 1915, a detachment of 38 men and 100 camels was sent to Jubaland in British East Africa but returned in November after the death of most of the camels. From May 1917 to January 1918, the Bahawalpur Camel Transport Corps operated with the South Waziristan Field Force against hostile Mahsud tribesmen, while between March and May 1918, it took part in a punitive expedition against rebellious Marri and Khetran tribesmen in Baluchistan.

=== Post First World War ===
In 1917, Bahawalpur State raised the Imperial Service Double Company, which was designated as 2nd Bahawalpur Household Infantry in 1922 and redesignated as 2nd Bahawalpur Haroon Infantry a year later. During the Third Afghan War of 1919, Bahawalpur Mounted Rifles and Camel Transport Corps operated in the Zhob Valley in Baluchistan. After the war, the Camel Corps was disbanded and the remaining elements eventually emerged as the 1st Bahawalpur Sadiq Battalion in 1924. In 1921, Bahawalpur joined the Indian State Forces Scheme, placing its two infantry battalions at the disposal of the Government of India. The Bahawalpur Infantry was mostly composed of Pashtuns from Bannu, Dera Ismail Khan, Tank and Lakki Marwat. Their uniforms underwent numerous changes, until settling for a grey colour in 1930. Ceremonial headdress included the distinctive 'fez', which was unique to the Bahawalpur State Forces. The badges of Bahawalpur Infantry also underwent numerous changes but included the pelican as their central theme.

=== The Second World War ===
On the outbreak of the Second World War, the Nawab of Bahawalpur placed his forces at the disposal of the British Government. In March 1941, the 1st Bahawalpur Infantry (Sadiq Battalion) was dispatched to Malaya in anticipation of impending hostilities with Japan. The battalion was deployed for the protection of airfields in Kedah in North Malaya. Following the Japanese invasion in December and their rapid advance, the battalion was forced to retreat towards Singapore with the rest of the British forces. On 15 February 1942, it was taken Prisoner of War at Singapore after the British surrender. Captain Mahmood Khan Durrani was awarded the George Cross for displaying outstanding courage, loyalty and fortitude during the harsh and brutal Japanese captivity. On repatriation after the war, the battalion was reformed in 1946. Bahawalpur raised two more battalions in 1940 and 1944. The 4th Battalion was redesignated as 3rd Bahawalpur Light Infantry in 1946 on conversion of the 3rd Battalion into Training Centre. The 2nd, 3rd and 4th Battalions remained in India.

== The Bahawalpur Regiment ==
On independence, Bahawalpur State acceded to Pakistan and in 1952, Bahawalpur Infantry was integrated into Pakistan Army as the Bahawalpur Regiment. The first and third Battalions were entirely composed of Pashtuns from Lakki Marwat and Dera Ismail Khan while the second and fourth Battalions were composed of Punjabi Muslims (Awans and Gujars) from Potohar and Mirpur, along with local Seraiki speaking Baloch, Jat Muslim and Khokhar recruits. The Regimental Centre was based at Dera Nawab Sahib. The uniform of the new regiment was of rifle green colour with scarlet facings. Officers' winter mess kit was of French grey cloth with black cuffs and facings, and blue overalls. The cummerbund sash was rifle green. Cap badge of gilding metal consisted of a pelican surmounted by a star and crescent, the whole surrounded by a date palm wreath, with a scroll below, inscribed 'Bahawalpur Regiment'. Backing for the cap badge was of circular maroon cloth. The lanyard was of maroon cord.

In July 1948, 5th Bahawalpur Light Infantry was raised from Muslim officers and men of 2nd Patiala Infantry and other non-Muslim states of Punjab, who had opted for Pakistan. It was redesignated as 4 Bahawalpur in 1952. In 1956, a major reorganization took place in Pakistan Army and the existing infantry regiments were amalgamated to form larger regimental groups. As a result, the Bahawalpur Regiment was merged with the Baluch Regiment. The new line up of Bahawalpur Infantry with its supporting artillery regiment was:

- 1st (Sadiq) Battalion The Bahawalpur Regiment - 8th Battalion The Baluch Regiment
- 2nd (Haroon) Battalion The Bahawalpur Regiment - 9th Battalion The Baluch Regiment
- 3rd (Abbas) Battalion The Bahawalpur Regiment - 20th Battalion The Baluch Regiment
- 4th Battalion The Bahawalpur Regiment - 21st Battalion The Baluch Regiment
- 1st Bahawalpur Field Artillery Regiment- 14 Field Regiment Artillery

== Battle honours of the Bahawalpur Regiment ==
- Battle honours awarded by the Governments of British India and Pakistan

Suez Canal, Egypt 1915-17, Gaza, Megiddo, Nablus, Palestine 1917–18, NW Frontier, India 1917, Baluchistan 1918, Johore, Singapore Island, Malaya 1941–42.

- Battle honours awarded by the Nawab of Bahawalpur

1st Kabul War 1837, Multan Campaign 1848, Mutiny 1857, 2nd Kabul War 1879, Great War 1914-18, East Africa 1915, Mesopotamia 1915, Persian Gulf 1916-18, Jordan Valley 1918, Waziristan 1917, Marri Field Force 1918, Afghanistan 1919, Kot Sabzal 1930.

== See also ==
- List of Indian Princely States
- Mahmood Khan Durrani, GC
