= Battle of Chumb =

Battle of the Indo-Pakistani War of 1971

Battle of Chumb (1971)
- Part of 1971 Indo-Pakistani War
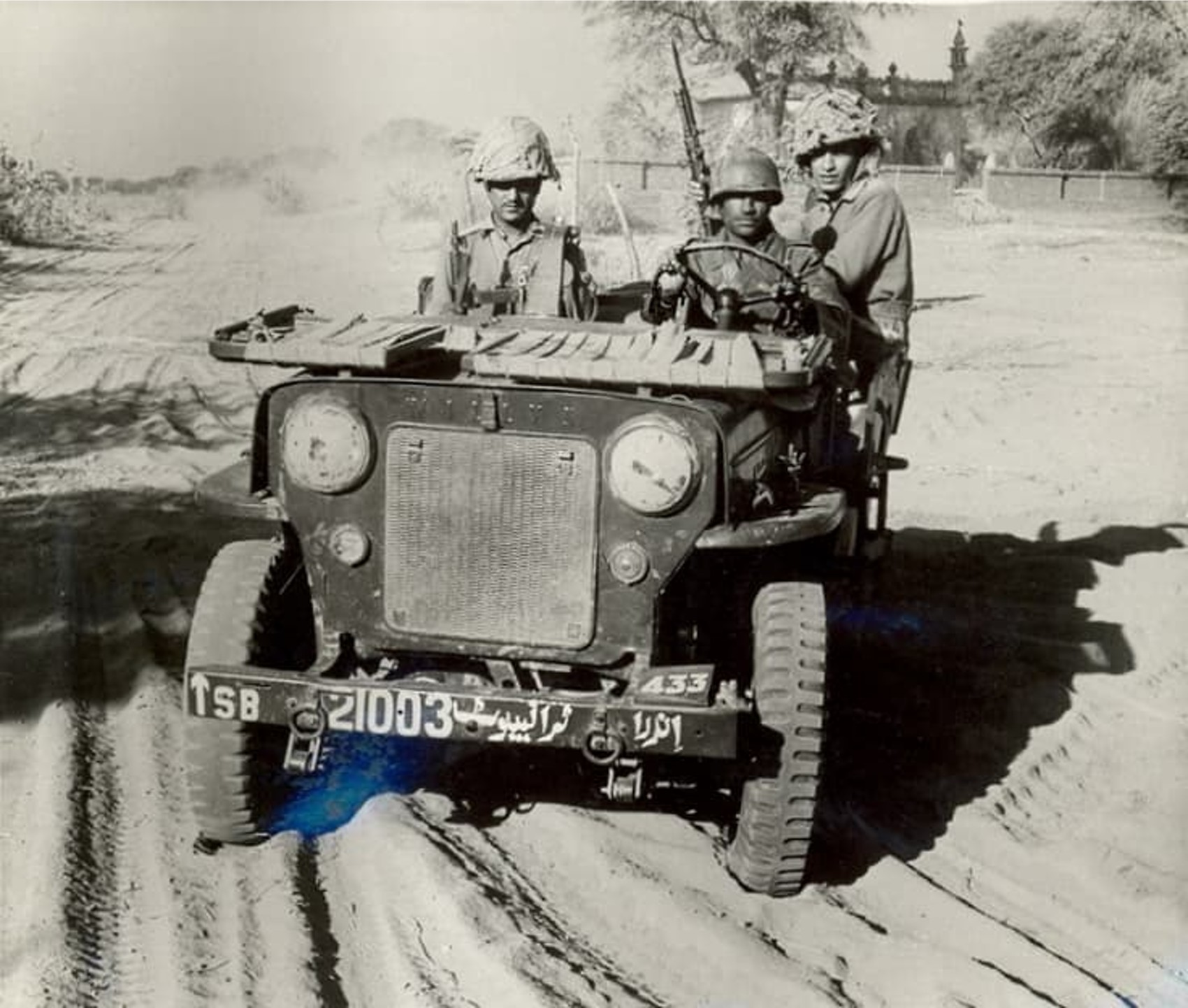
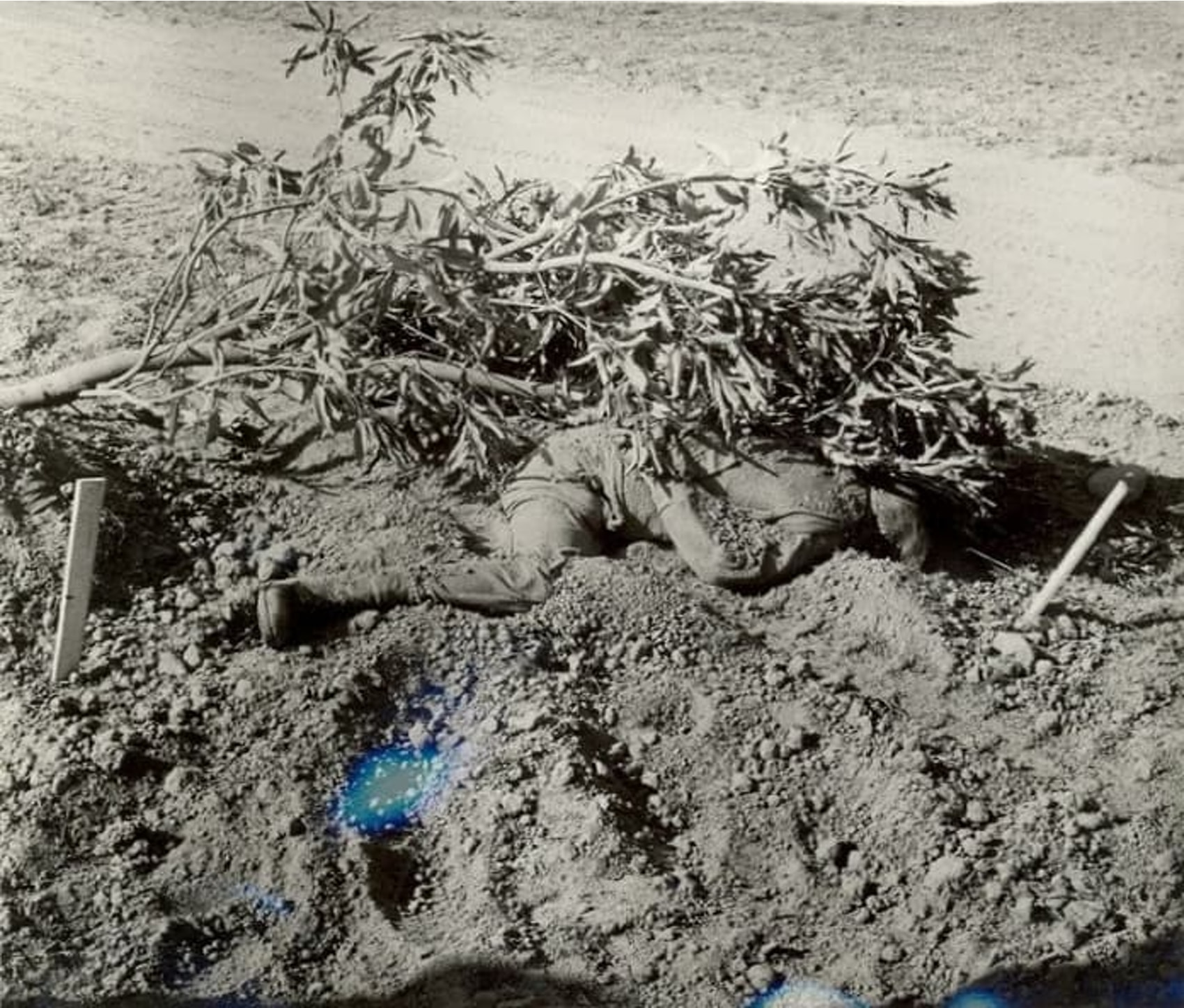
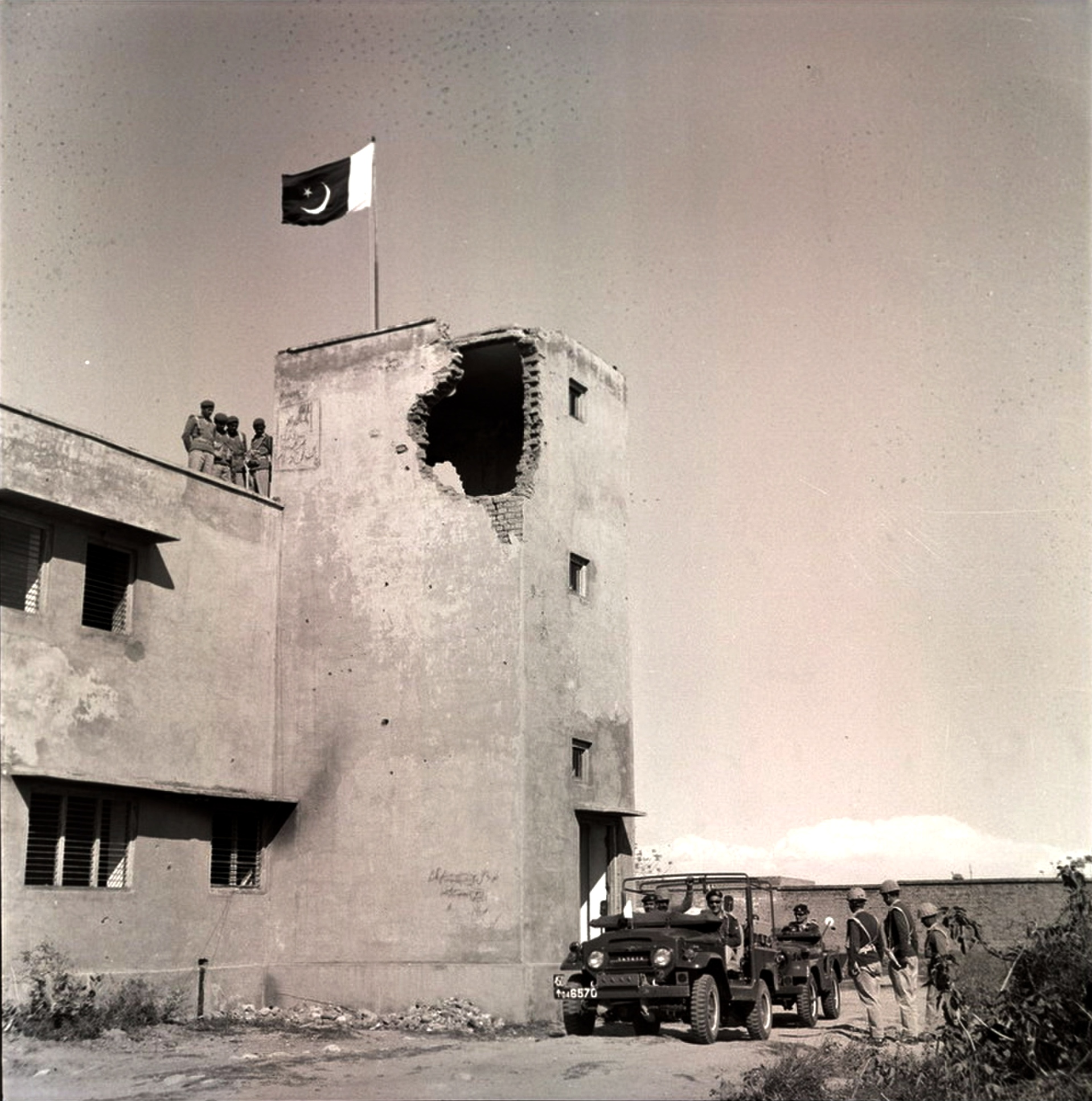
- Top to bottom, left to right: 1. Digitized map of the Chumb sector in Kashmir with the rough area captured by Pakistan hatched in yellow.; 2. Pakistani soldiers riding on a captured Indian army jeep that has been painted with the word Indira transport in Urdu.; 3. An Indian soldier killed in action.; 4. Pakistani flag raised over Chumb Tehsil HQ by the 28 Cavalry
Date	3 December 1971 to 11 December 1971
Location	Chumb, Jammu and Kashmir, India (present−day Azad Jammu and Kashmir, Pakistan) 32.838°N 74.404°E
Result	Pakistani victory
Territorial changes	Pakistan Captured 220 km^{2} of territory in Chumb but retained only 158 km^{2} of territory as per the Simla agreement and returned the rest of the land it captured back to India.

Belligerents
India	Pakistan

Commanders and leaders
(India) Maj. Gen. Jaswant Singh	(Pakistan) Maj. Gen. Iftikhar Janjua †

Units involved
Indian Army List of Indian units: 10 Division; Divisional troops; C company 12 Guards (ENTAC ATGMs); Para commando group A; 61 Engineer battalion; 106 Engineer battalion; 10 Division signal regiment; 9 Deccan horse; 72 Armored regiment; 2nd Independent Armored reconnaissance squadron; 28 Infantry brigade; 5 Rajput regiment; 2 JAK rifles; 8 JAK militia; 52 Infantry brigade; 16 Punjab; 7 Garhwal; 3/4 Gorkha rifles; 68 Infantry brigade; 7 Kumaon; 5/8 Gorkha rifles; 68 Infantry brigade signal company; 191 infantry brigade; 5 Sikh; 5 Assam; 4/1 Gorkha rifles; 10 Garhwal rifles; 10 Artillery division; 12 Field regiment; 18 Field regiment; 81 Field regiment; 39 Medium regiment; 216 Medium regiment; 86 Light regiment; 151 Air defense regiment Echo troop; 127th Divisional locating battery; 1 Battery (ex-176 Field regiment) Indian Air Force; 1. No. 20 Squadron; 2. No. 45 Squadron; 3. No. 101 Squadron; Border Security Force; 51 BSF Battalion; 57 BSF battalion	Pakistan Army List of Pakistani units: 23 Division; Divisional units; 19 Baloch R&S regiment; 474 Engineer battalion; 105 Engineer battalion; 10 Independent field engineer company; 58 AK field company engineer; Zakaria Company Special Service Group; 41 Signal battalion; 46 Supply and transport battalion; 60 EME battalion; 5 Field ambulance; 2 Armored Brigade; 11 PAVO Cavalry; 26 Cavalry; 28 Cavalry; 12 Independent Armored Squadron; 20 Brigade; 14 Punjab battalion; 47 Punjab battalion; 17 Frontier Force; 66 Brigade; 4 Punjab battalion; 23 Baloch; 33 Frontier Force; 111 Infantry brigade; 42 Punjab battalion; 10 Baloch battalion; 3 Frontier Force; 4 Azad Kashmir Brigade; 2 AK Battalion; 6 AK Battalion; 13 AK Battalion; 7 AK Brigade; 1 AK Battalion; 4 AK Battalion; 8 AK Battalion; 23 Artillery Division; 11 Field Regiment; 39 Field Regiment; 51 Composite mountain Regiment; 71 Mountain Regiment; 64 Medium Regiment; 81 AK Battery; 285 Division locating battery; 17 Artillery division; 50 Field regiment; 63 Field regiment; 28 Medium regiment; 209 Locating battery Pakistan Air Force; 1. No. 18 Squadron; 2. No. 26 Squadron Civil defense; 1. Frontier Corps; 2. Zhob Militia; 3. Mahsud Scouts; 4. Pakistan Rangers; 5. Chenab rangers; 6. Azad Kashmir rangers; Local volunteers

Strength
126 Artillery guns; 104 Tanks; 90 T-54 and T-55; 14 others; 60 Aircraft	130 Artillery guns; 129 Tanks; 74 T-59; ~ 48 M4A1E6 Shermans; ~ 7 M36B2 Tank busters; 40 Aircraft

Casualties and losses
Indian casualties: 1353 casualties; 440 KIA; 723 wounded; 190 POW/MIA; 4 aircraft lost; 2 Su-7s; 1 Mig-21; 1 Hawker Hunter; 3 aircraft damaged; 2 Su-7s; 1 Hawker Hunter; 2 artillery batteries captured; 1 squadron of tanks captured	Pakistani casualties: 2216 casualties; 2 F-86 Sabres lost
- Location of the battle with present−day geopolitical borders in the Kashmir region

The Battle of Chumb (3 December – 11 December 1971) was a major battle between the forces of Pakistan and India during the 1971 Indo-Pakistani war. It was one of the first major engagements in the western front of the war in which the Pakistani 23rd Division captured the strategically important city of Chumb from the Indian 10th Infantry Division.

== Background ==
Prior to the outbreak of war in 1971, Chumb was under Indian control, having been handed back by Pakistan under the Tashkent Agreement after the Battle of Chumb (1965) during the 1965 Indo-Pakistani War.

=== Pakistani plans and preparations ===
The offensive was designed by Pakistani military planners as a defensive maneuver to prevent the Indians from using Chumb as a base of operations to attack Gujrat, Lalamusa and Kharian as the crucial north–south line of communication i.e. - the Grand Trunk Road lay between 35 and 40 miles from Chumb.

The Pakistan Army's 23 Division which was responsible for operations in the area had received orders from the GHQ to capture and protect the Chumb-Dewa sector. It had 5 infantry brigades and 26 Cavalry as its main armored force which had old M4A1E6 Shermans. Hence, 11 Cavalry with T-59s and an Independent Armored Squadron with M36B2s from the 6th Armored Division along with an infantry brigade and artillery resources from the I Corps were transferred a month prior to the war to support the 23 Division's force.

=== Indian plans and preparations ===
Having learnt from Operation Grand Slam, the Indian Army's 10th Division was responsible to prevent a Pakistani advance towards Akhnoor which served as the main line of communications between India and Indian Administered Kashmir. Though the Pakistani Army wasn't in a state to start an offensive of this scale, the division was tasked to defend the Chhamb-Jourian sector and also attack across the border. In addition to its regular brigades (28, 52 and 191); 68 Infantry Brigade, which was the XV Corps reserve brigade in the Kashmir valley was earmarked as its fourth brigade. 191 Brigade was moved to Chhamb, 68 Brigade was kept as reserve at Akhnoor, while the other infantry brigades and armoured elements were at Kalit-Troti/Taroti (not to be confused with Tatrinote exactly on LAC in Poonch district). Anticipating the onset of a Pakistani attack, 52 Brigade was deployed in the area Nawan Harimpur, 28 Brigade on the Kalidhar range and 68 Brigade to the Troti heights.

== Strength ==
Brigadier Amar Cheema of the Indian Army, while comparing the strength of two countries during the battle, claimed that the Indian Armed Forces had superior tanks such as T-55 and T-54 who were equipped with 100 mm guns. They were said to be far superior to those of the Pakistani Type 59 tank.

The Indian T-55 tanks also possessed APDS ammunition firing capability which the Pakistani Type 59 tanks did not have. The T-55 had a far superior stabilization system.

Cheema also claims that there was near parity in terms of artillery but, when it came to infantry, the Pakistan army had fewer soldiers than the Indian army during the battle. He states that "it was this battle which helped in sustaining the morale of Pakistan army. The Indians, on the other hand, describe it as a most serious reverse suffered in the 1971 war".

== Outcome ==
The fierce battle led to thousands of civilians evacuating the area.

Towards the end of the battle, the Indian Army hastily retreated from the area with little resistance, leaving behind entire volumes of sensitive documents and radios tuned to their respective codes.

Under the Simla Agreement, signed between India and Pakistan on 2 July 1972, Pakistan retained the territory it captured in the Chumb sector.

== See also ==
- Operation Grand Slam
