= British East Africa 1896 =

British East Africa 1896 is a Battle Honour awarded to the 24th (Baluchistan) (Duchess of Connaught's Own) Regiment of Bombay Infantry; an infantry battalion of the British Indian Army, which participated in the 1896 expedition to British East Africa to suppress a local rebellion.

== Expedition to British East Africa 1896 ==
In 1895, a claimant to the chieftainship of Takaungu in British East African Protectorate rebelled against British authority. This led to widespread disturbances in the districts of Wanga, Mombasa and Malindi (in modern Kenya). In March 1896, the 24th (Baluchistan) (Duchess of Connaught's Own) Regiment of Bombay Infantry (now 6th Battalion The Baloch Regiment of Pakistan Army) under the command of Lieutenant Colonel Alfred Astley Pearson was ordered to Mombasa to restore order. The rebellion was soon brought under control by occupation of food centres and relentless pursuit of insurgents by battalion columns. In July 1896, the 24th Baluchistan Infantry returned to Quetta. For its services in the campaign, the battalion was awarded the Battle Honour of 'British East Africa 1896' in 1901. The Battle Honour is unique to this unit. In 1922, when the Regimental Group System was adopted by the British Indian Army, the battalion was redesignated as the 1st Battalion (Duchess of Connaught's Own) 10th Baluch Regiment, and the Battle Honour was extended to all the battalions of 10th Baluch Regiment.

== See also ==
- Battle Honour
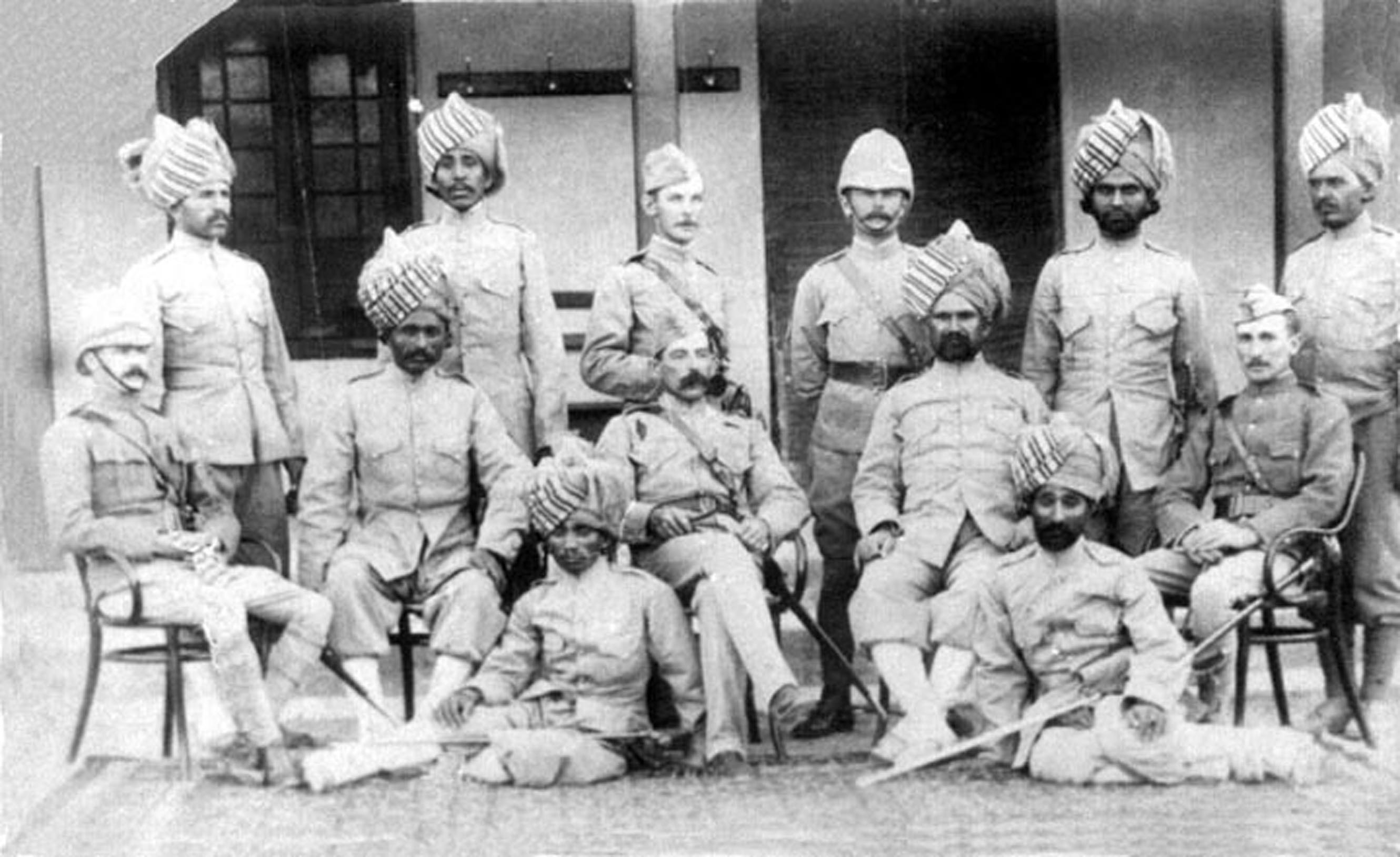
  24th (Baluchistan) (Duchess of Connaught's Own) Regiment of Bombay Infantry. Lieutenant Colonel AA Pearson (centre) commanding. Quetta, 1896.
- 124th Duchess of Connaught's Own Baluchistan Infantry
- 10th Baluch Regiment
- The Baloch Regiment
- General Sir Alfred Astley Pearson, KCB
- East Africa Protectorate
- Colours, standards and guidons
