= Baluch Regiment =

Baluch Regiment may refer to:

- the 10th Baluch Regiment of the Indian Army (1895–1947)
- the successor Baloch Regiment of the Pakistan Army
