= British East Africa 1897–99 =

British East Africa 1897–99 is a Battle Honour awarded to 27th Regiment (1st Baluch Battalion) of Bombay (Light) Infantry; an infantry battalion of the British Indian Army, which participated in the 1897 expedition to British East Africa to suppress a rebellion.

== Expedition to British East Africa 1897–99 ==
In the late 19th century, the British took over control of area now forming Kenya and Uganda and declared it as the British East Africa Protectorate. However, despite harsh measures, they faced stiff resistance from the local princes and chiefs. In 1897, the situation took a serious turn in areas now forming Uganda, when the Sudanese troops of the local militia mutinied and killed their British officers. In December 1897, the 27th Regiment (1st Baluch Battalion) of Bombay (Light) Infantry (now 10th Battalion The Baloch Regiment of Pakistan Army) under Lieutenant Colonel WA Broome was despatched to East Africa to quell the rebellion. After a tough anti-insurgency operation lasting for a year, the situation was brought under control by January 1899, and the battalion returned to Karachi in May. During the campaign, the battalion suffered 56 casualties. For its services in the campaign, the Baluch battalion was awarded the Battle Honour of ‘British East Africa 1897–99’ in 1901. The Battle Honour is unique to this unit. In 1922, when the Regimental Group System was adopted by the British Indian Army, the battalion was redesignated as the 3rd Battalion (Queen Mary's Own) 10th Baluch Regiment, and the Battle Honour was extended to all the battalions of 10th Baluch Regiment.

== See also ==
- Battle Honour
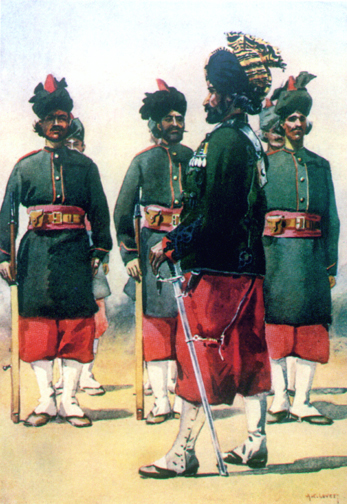
  127th (Queen Mary's Own) Baluch Light Infantry. Watercolour by AC Lovett, 1910.
- 127th Baluch Light Infantry
- 10th Baluch Regiment
- The Baloch Regiment
- East Africa Protectorate
- Colours, standards and guidons
