= Fazal Din =

Indian recipient of the Victoria Cross (1921–1945)

Fazal Din VC
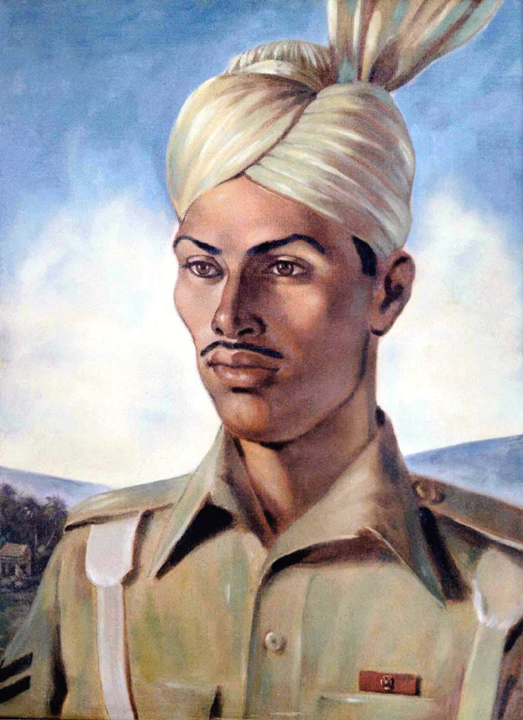
- Fazal Din c. 1945
- Born: 1 July 1921; Hoshiarpur, Punjab Province (British India)
- Died: 2 March 1945 (aged 23); Meiktila, British Burma
- Military career
- Branch: British Raj
- Service years: 1940–1945
- Rank: Naik
- Units: 7th Battalion, 10th Baluch Regiment
- Conflicts: Second World War; Pacific War; Burma campaign; Burma campaign (1944–45); Battle of Meiktila (DOW)
- Awards: Victoria Cross (1945, posthumously)

Naik Fazal Din (1 July 1921 – 2 March 1945) was an Indian recipient of the Victoria Cross award, the highest award for gallantry in the face of the enemy that can be awarded to British and Commonwealth forces.

== Early life ==
He was born in 1921 to a Punjabi agricultural family of Arain in Village Hussianpur of Hoshiarpur District of Punjab Province (British India). Fazal Din, having only passed Middle School, was inspired to join the British Indian Army by the outbreak of the World War. He was recruited as a rifleman and became a section gunner in the 10th Baluch Regiment, before rising to the rank of Naik - equivalent to a British Army corporal.

== Victoria Cross citation ==
Fazal Din was 23 years old, and an acting naik in the 7th Battalion of 10th Baluch Regiment, British Indian Army (Note: now 15th Battalion of The Baloch Regiment of the Pakistan Army) during the Battle of Meiktila.

The official citation to the award describes his actions:

In Burma, on 2nd March, 1945, Naik Fazal Din was commanding a section during a Company attack on a Japanese bunkered position. During this attack, the section found itself in an area flanked by three bunkers on one side and a house and one bunker on the other side. This was the key of the enemy position and had held up a Company attack made earlier. Naik Fazal Din's section was accompanied by a tank but, at the time of entering the area, it had gone on ahead. On reaching the area, the section was held up by Light Machine Gun fire and grenades from the bunkers. Unhesitatingly Naik Fazal Din personally attacked the nearest bunker with grenades and silenced it. He then led his section under heavy fire against the other bunkers. Suddenly six Japanese, led by two officers wielding swords, rushed from the house. The Bren gunner shot one officer and a Japanese other rank but by then had expended the magazine of the gun. He was almost simultaneously attacked by the second Japanese officer who killed him with his sword. Naik Fazal Din went to the Bren gunner's assistance immediately but, in doing so, was run through the chest by the officer, the sword point appearing through his back. On the Japanese officer withdrawing his sword, Naik Fazal Din, despite his terrible wound, tore the sword from the officer and killed him with it. He then attacked a Japanese other rank and also killed him. He then went to the assistance of a sepoy of his section who was struggling with another Japanese and killed the latter with the sword. Then, waving the sword, he continued to encourage his men. He staggered to Platoon Headquarters, about 25 yards away, to make a report and collapsed. He died soon after reaching the Regimental Aid Post.

Naik Fazal Din's action was seen by almost the whole Platoon who, undoubtedly inspired by his gallantry and taking advantage of the bewilderment created amongst the enemy by the loss of its leaders, continued the attack and annihilated the garrison which numbered 55.

Such supreme devotion to duty, even when fatally wounded, presence of mind and outstanding courage, have seldom been equalled and reflect the unquenchable spirit of a singularly brave and gallant N.C.O.
