= 81 Medium Regiment (India) =

- Active: 1961 – present
- Country: India
- Allegiance: India
- Branch: Indian Army
- Type: Artillery
- Size: Regiment
- Nickname(s): The Mighty One
- Motto(s): Sarvatra, Izzat-O-Iqbal (Everywhere with Honour and Glory)
- Colors: Red & Navy Blue
- Anniversaries: 1 March – Raising Day

Insignia
- Abbreviation: 81 Med Regt

81 Medium Regiment is part of the Regiment of Artillery of the Indian Army.

== Formation and history ==
The regiment was raised on 1 March 1961 at Jalandhar Cantonment, Punjab as 81 Heavy Mortar Regiment. The first commanding officer was Lieutenant Colonel (later Brigadier) Sreedharman Singh VrC. The regiment was subsequently converted to a field regiment and is now a medium regiment. The regiment consists of 147, 148 and 149 medium batteries.

== Operations ==
The regiment has taken part in the following operations –

- Indo-Pakistani War of 1965 – The regiment took part in Operation Riddle. It lost one officer and four other ranks during the war.
- Indo-Pakistani War of 1971 – 81 Field Regiment took part in Operation Cactus Lily and fought valiantly in Battle of Chhamb. It was part of the divisional artillery of 10 Infantry Division, but saw most of the action under 191 Infantry Brigade. The unit lost one officer and eight other ranks during the war. It fired over 6400 rounds during this operation.
- Counter-terrorist operations - The regiment took part in anti-insurgency operations in Firozpur, Punjab, near the Bhutan–India border in Assam, and in Jammu and Kashmir in the early 2000s.
  - Operation Rakshak I and II (Punjab)
  - Operation Rhino
  - Operation Rakshak (Jammu and Kashmir)
- Operation Vijay
- Operation Parakram
- Operation Snow Leopard

== Gallantry awards ==
The regiment has won the following gallantry awards–

- Vir Chakra – Havildar K Palani
- Mentioned in dispatches – Colonel P Prabhu Raj

== Motto ==
The motto of the regiment is मेहनत की जीत (Mehnat Ki Jeet), which translates to ‘Victory of hard work’.

== Notable officers ==
- Brigadier Sreedharman Singh VrC – First commanding officer
- Lieutenant General Eric George Kerr – He was the first Adjutant of the regiment, retired as Director General of the Artillery
- Lieutenant General Ashok Manglik PVSM, SM – He was the first Quarter Master of the regiment
- Brigadier Vijay Chopra – Commanded the regiment
- Brigadier Ashish Uppal – Silver Gun winner

== See also ==
- List of artillery regiments of Indian Army
