= Abrar Hussain =

Abrar Hussain may refer to:

- Abrar Hussain (general) (1918–1992), Pakistani war hero
- Abrar Hussain (boxer) (1965–2011), Pakistani boxer
