= 124th Duchess of Connaught's Own Baluchistan Infantry =

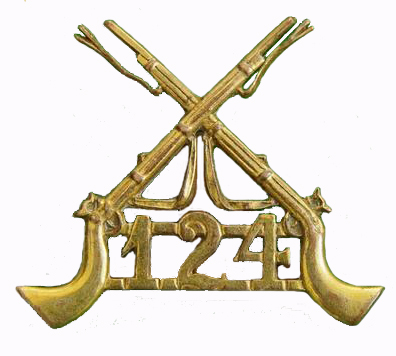
- Active: 1903–1922
- Country: British India
- Branch: British Indian Army
- Type: Infantry
- Size: 3 Battalions
- Uniform: Red; faced deep green; emerald green in 1885; Drab; faced red in 1891; red trousers
- Engagements: Expedition to Aden 1839; Indian Rebellion of 1857; Second Afghan War 1879-80; British East Africa 1896; World War I (Mesopotamia, Persia, Palestine); Third Afghan War 1919; Iraqi Revolt 1920

Commanders
- Colonel-in-Chief: The Duchess of Connaught
- Colonel of the Regiment: Gen Sir Alfred Astley Pearson, KCB

The 124th Duchess of Connaught's Own Baluchistan Infantry was an infantry regiment of the British Indian Army raised in 1820 as the 2nd (Marine) Battalion 12th Regiment of Bombay Native Infantry. It was designated as the 124th Duchess of Connaught's Own Baluchistan Infantry in 1903 and became 1st Battalion 10th Baluch Regiment in 1922. In 1947, it was allocated to Pakistan Army, where it continues to exist as 6th Battalion of The Baloch Regiment.

== Early history ==
The regiment was raised in June 1820 at Bombay as the 2nd (Marine) Battalion 12th Regiment of Bombay Native Infantry by Captain Deschamps. In 1824, it was designated as the 24th Regiment of Bombay Native Infantry. On 19 January 1839, it stormed and captured the city of Aden as part of a punitive expedition sent to rid the area of pirates. During the Indian Rebellion of 1857-58, the regiment, under the command of Major WG Duncan, operated in Central India against the Marathas led by Tatya Tope and the Rani of Jhansi. In December 1857, it joined the Central India Field Force and during the next six months, fought in several major engagements, including the storming of the fortress of Rahatgarh, the Relief of Saugor, the capture of Jhansi and the Battle of Kalpi, where the Mahratta Army was decisively defeated. It remained employed in mopping up operations till 15 December 1858. During the campaign, it suffered a total of 52 casualties. In 1879-80, it participated in the Second Afghan War, where it was deployed on the line of communication.

In 1891, the regiment was localized to the Province of Baluchistan and reconstituted with Balochis, Brahuis, Pathans and Punjabi Muslims. It adopted uniform of drab colour with red trousers and its designation was changed to 24th (Baluchistan) Regiment of Bombay Infantry. In 1895, the Duchess of Connaught was appointed the Colonel-in-Chief of the regiment. In 1896, it was dispatched to British East Africa under the command of Lieutenant Colonel AA Pearson to suppress a rebellion in areas now forming Kenya. In 1901, the regiment's designation was changed to 24th (Duchess of Connaught's Own) Baluchistan Infantry.

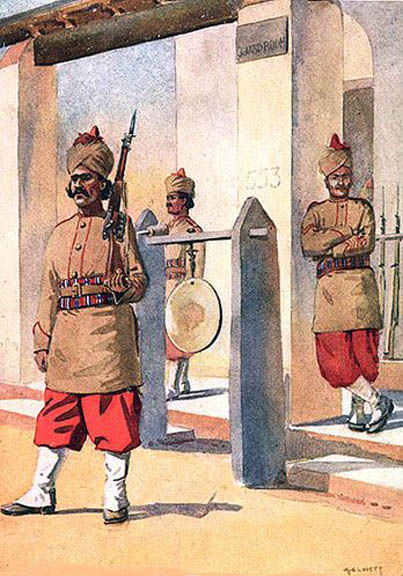
Quarter Guard of 124th Duchess of Connaught's Own Baluchistan Infantry. Watercolour by AC Lovett, c. 1910. Two Punjabi Muslims on the left and a Hazara on the right.

== 124th Duchess of Connaught's Own Baluchistan Infantry ==
Subsequent to the reforms brought about in the Indian Army by Lord Kitchener in 1903, all former Bombay Army units had 100 added to their numbers. Consequently, the regiment's designation was changed to 124th Duchess of Connaught's Own Baluchistan Infantry and it was delocalized from Baluchistan.

On the outbreak of the First World War, the regiment was sent to Persia in 1916, where it raised a second battalion later that year. The 2nd Battalion served with great gallantry in the Mesopotamian Campaign, where it fought in the Battles of Khudaira Bend, Jebel Hamrin and Tikrit. In 1918, it proceeded to Palestine and took part in the Battle of Megiddo, which led to the defeat of Turkish Army in Palestine. In the meantime, a third battalion was raised in 1917, which served in South Persia and later, in the Third Afghan War of 1919 and during the Arab uprising in Iraq in 1920. The 1st Battalion also served in the Third Afghan War. During the First World War, the three battalions of 124th DCO Baluchistan Infantry suffered a total of 1179 casualties including 459 killed or died of disease.

== Subsequent History ==
In 1921, the 3/124th DCO Baluchistan Infantry was disbanded, while the remaining two battalions were grouped with four other Baluch battalions: 126th Baluchistan Infantry, 127th Queen Mary's Own Baluch Light Infantry, 129th Duke of Connaught's Own Baluchis and the 130th King George's Own Baluchis (Jacob's Rifles), to form the 10th Baluch Regiment in 1922. The 1/124th DCO Baluchistan Infantry became the 1st Battalion and 2/124th DCO Baluchistan Infantry the 10th (Training) Battalion of the new regiment. During the Second World War, 1/10th Baluch (DCO) served in Iran, Iraq, Syria and Lebanon. In 1943, the 10th Battalion became the 10th Baluch Regimental Centre. In 1945, the 10th Baluch Regiment lost its number and became The Baluch Regiment. On the independence of Pakistan in 1947, it was allocated to Pakistan Army. In 1956, on the merger of 8th Punjab and Bahawalpur Regiments with the Baluch Regiment, 1 Baluch was redesignated as 6 Baluch (now 6 Baloch). During the Indo-Pakistan War of 1965, the battalion served in the Rann of Kutch and Kasur Sectors.

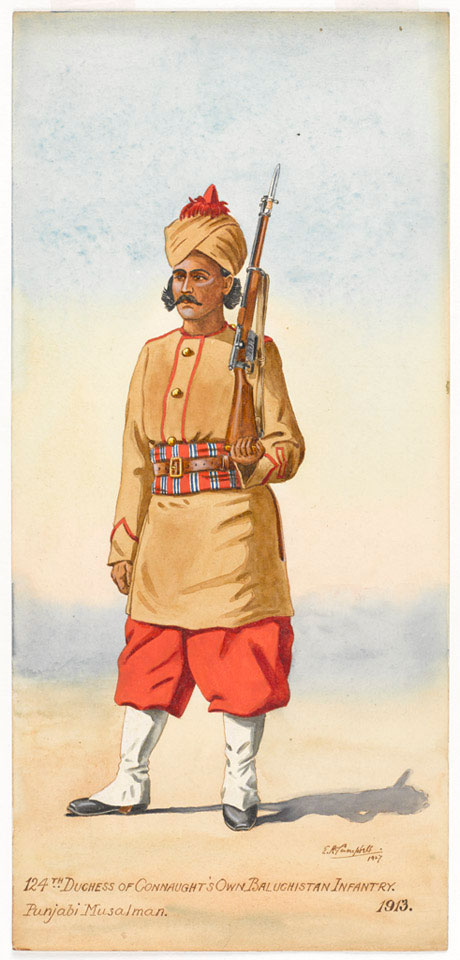
124th Duchess of Connaught's Own Baluchistan Infantry, 1913. Punjabi Musalman', 1927

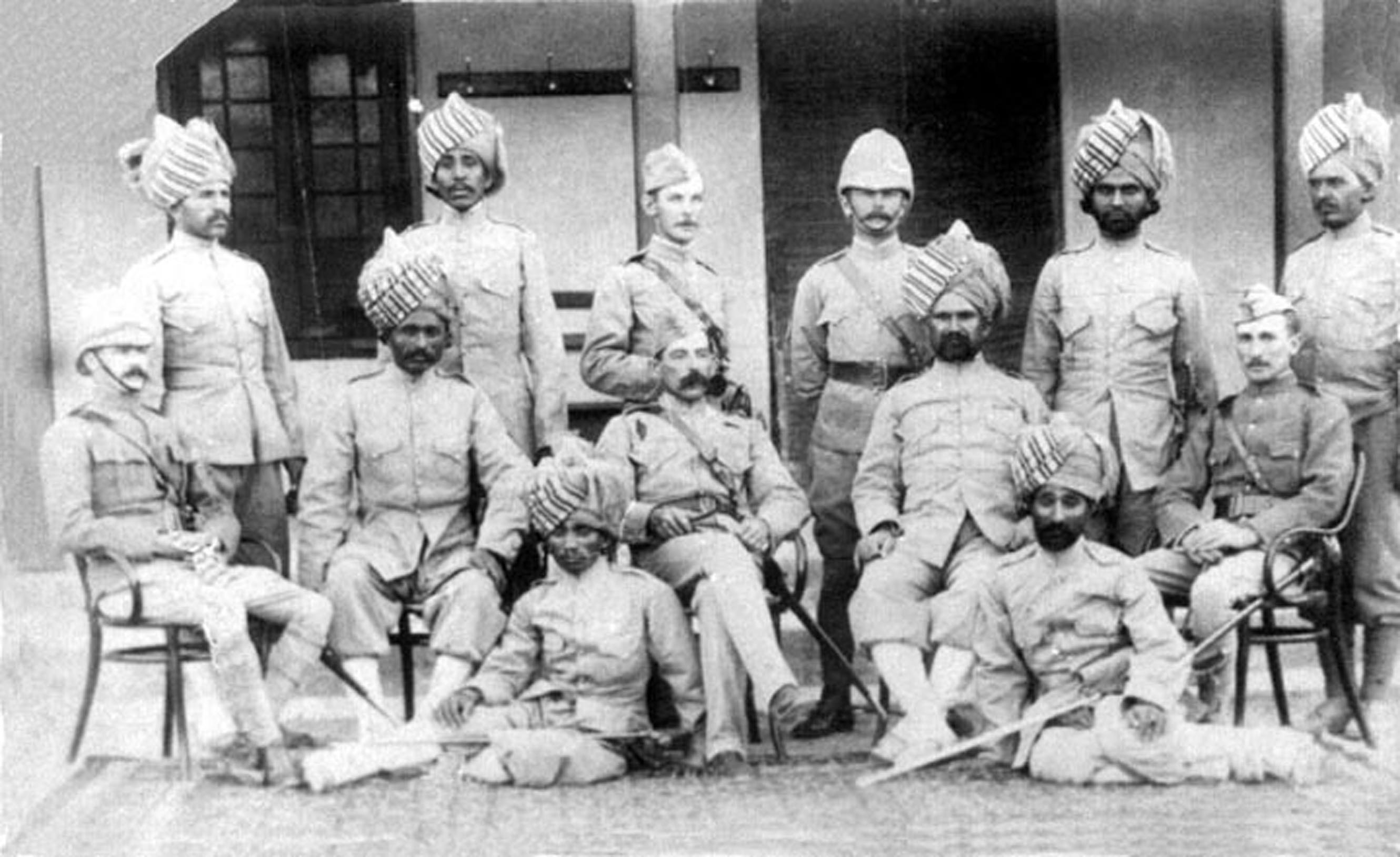
24th (Baluchistan) (Duchess of Connaught's Own) Regiment of Bombay Infantry. Lieutenant Colonel Alfred A Pearson (centre) commanding. Quetta, 1896.

== Genealogy ==
- 1820 - 2nd (Marine) Battalion 12th Regiment Bombay Native Infantry
- 1823 - 2nd Battalion 12th Regiment Bombay Native Infantry
- 1824 - 24th Regiment Bombay Native Infantry
- 1885 - 24th Regiment Bombay Infantry
- 1891 - 24th (Baluchistan) Regiment Bombay Infantry
- 1895 - 24th (Baluchistan) (Duchess of Connaught's Own) Regiment of Bombay Infantry
- 1901 - 24th (Duchess of Connaught's Own) Baluchistan Infantry
- 1903 - 124th Duchess of Connaught's Own Baluchistan Infantry
- 1917 - 1st Battalion 124th Duchess of Connaught's Own Baluchistan Infantry
- 1922 - 1st Battalion (Duchess of Connaught's Own) 10th Baluch Regiment or 1/10th Baluch
- 1945 - 1st Battalion (Duchess of Connaught's Own) The Baluch Regiment or 1 Baluch
- 1956 - 6th Battalion The Baluch Regiment or 6 Baluch
- 1991 - 6th Battalion The Baloch Regiment or 6 Baloch

== See also ==
Officer of 124th Duchess of Connaught's Own Baluchistan Infantry, 1904, by GH Brennan

- 10th Baluch Regiment
- The Baloch Regiment
- Lieutenant William Alexander Kerr, VC
- General Sir Alfred Astley Pearson, KCB
- British East Africa 1896
