= 151 Air Defence Regiment (India) =

151 Air Defence Regiment (Self Propelled)
- Active: 1966 – present
- Country: India
- Allegiance: India
- Branch: Indian Army
- Type: Corps of Army Air Defence
- Size: Regiment
- Nickname(s): Chhamb Warriors
- Motto(s): Sanskrit: आकाशे शत्रुन् जहि English: Defeat the Enemy in the Sky
- Colors: Sky Blue and Red
- Anniversaries: 1 July (Raising Day); 5 December (Chhamb Day)
- Battle honours: Chhamb

Insignia
- Abbreviation: 151 AD Regt (SP)

151 Air Defence Regiment (Self Propelled) is part of the Corps of Army Air Defence of the Indian Army. It consists of 1511, 1512 and 1513 air defence batteries.

== Formation ==
151 Air Defence Regiment was raised on 1 July 1966 at Army Ordnance Corps Centre at Secunderabad.

== Equipment ==
At raising, the regiment was equipped with Bofors 40 mm L/60 guns. The unit was re-organised as a Composite Air Defence Regiment in November 1977, when it was equipped with one battery of the Soviet ZSU-23-4 Shilka self-propelled, radar-guided anti-aircraft weapon system and two batteries of Soviet ZU-23 towed 23×152 mm anti-aircraft twin-barrelled auto-cannons. On 1 December 1983, the regiment was re-organised as 151 Air Defence Regiment (Self Propelled) with three batteries of Schilkas. The unit became the first one to be equipped with the upgraded Schilka systems in 2014.

== Operations ==
The regiment has taken part in the following operations:

Indo-Pakistani War of 1971

The unit equipped with L/60 guns took part in Operation Cactus Lily in Jammu and Kashmir in December 1971. 1511 battery played an important role in the defence of Srinagar airfield. The airfield was subject to daily Pakistani air attacks between 3 and 6 December, 1971. There were sporadic raids after that till 10 December. The AD gunners, to their credit, foiled every attack to this vital airfield and claimed three hits, including one downing of a Pakistani Sabre jet.

1512 battery did well in defending field artillery guns, wagon lines, Akhnoor ferry, Mandiala bridge and the divisional headquarters of 10 Infantry Division. Two troops were part of the 26 Artillery Brigade under 26 Infantry Division.

For its effective deterrence during the battle, the unit was awarded the honour title 'Chhamb'.

The unit won the following gallantry awards-

- Vir Chakra – Gunner Arumugam P (posthumous) for operations in Srinagar airfield, where he downed a Sabre jet, but was killed in strafing by a follow up jet. Havildar Uttam Jawalge won the award for shooting down a Sabre which was involved in the air attack to the divisional headquarters.
- Mentioned in dispatches – Naik Dattatray Pawar, Gunner Joseph Dunna

Operation Trident

December 1986-March 1987.

Operation Rakshak

Counter terrorism operations in Punjab (November 1982-February 1983) and Jammu and Kashmir (August 1988-June 1999). The unit won the following gallantry awards –

- Sena Medal – Captain Suranjan Banerjee (posthumous, 1997) and Major JR Sharma (1999).

Operation Vijay

Lieutenant Colonel R Shrivasvat was awarded the COAS Commendation Card for his commendable performance as a Brigade Major of an Infantry Brigade during the operations.

Operation Parakram

December 2001-March 2003. The unit lost Havildar KBMB Tadavi and Gunner Gopa Kumar P during the operations.

== Achievements ==
- The Regiment was awarded Director General Army Air Defence Unit Appreciation award twice.
- The regiment had the honour to participate in the Republic Day Parade in 1984 with its Shilka weapon systems.
- Major Sachin Nugyal was awarded COAS Commendation Card in August 2025 for Operation Sindoor.
