= Alfred Astley Pearson =

General Sir Alfred Astley Pearson
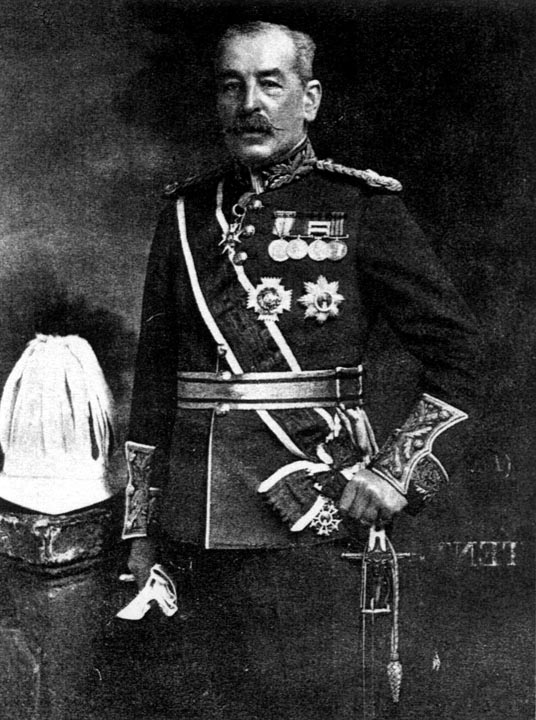
- Born: 5 June 1850; Calcutta, British India
- Died: 26 November 1937 (aged 87) Middlesex, England
- Allegiance: United Kingdom
- Branch: British Indian Army
- Rank: General
- Commands: 24th (Baluchistan) Regiment of Bombay Infantry 1894–1902; 4th (Quetta) Division 1905–1906; 3rd (Lahore) Division 1908–1912
- Awards: Knight Commander of the Order of the Bath; Order of the Brilliant Star of Zanzibar

General Sir Alfred Astley Pearson KCB (5 June 1850 – 26 November 1937) was a British Indian Army officer.

== Military career ==
Pearson was commissioned a second lieutenant on 8 February 1870, promoted to lieutenant on 28 October 1871, to captain on 8 February 1882, and to major on 1 July 1887. He commanded the 24th (Baluchistan) Regiment of Bombay Infantry (later 124th Duchess of Connaught's Own Baluchistan Infantry) and 1st Battalion 10th Baluch Regiment (later 6th Battalion The Baloch Regiment) from 1894 to 1902. Promoted to lieutenant-colonel on 8 February 1896, he led his battalion that year to British East Africa to suppress a rebellion in areas now forming Kenya. He received the brevet rank of colonel on 8 February 1900, and was appointed as temporary assistant adjutant-general (probably in Poona, in the Bombay Command) on 7 July 1900. In 1902 he officiated as Colonel on the Staff in Cawnpore.

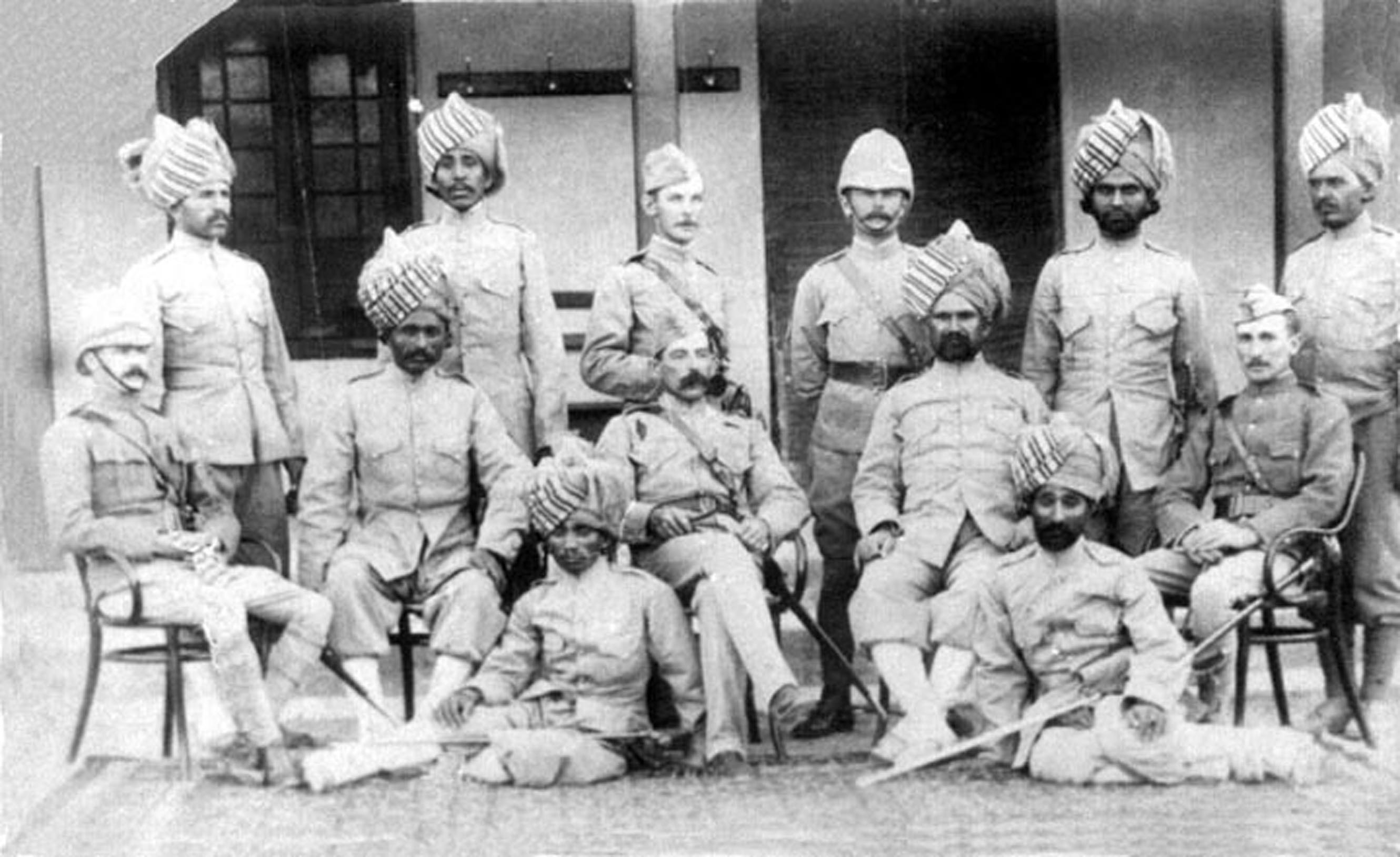
24th (Baluchistan) (Duchess of Connaught's Own) Regiment of Bombay Infantry. Lieutenant Colonel Alfred A Pearson (centre) commanding. Quetta, 1896.

In 1904, he officiated as the Adjutant General of Indian Army. He commanded the 4th (Quetta) Division in 1905–6; was Inspector-General of Volunteers in India, 1906–8; and in command of the 3rd (Lahore) Division, Northern Army, 1908–12. He was made Knight Commander of the Order of the Bath in the 1911 Coronation Honours. Sir Alfred was the Colonel of 124th Duchess of Connaught's Own Baluchistan Infantry.
