= 72nd Armoured Regiment (India) =

Indian Army regiment

72 Armoured Regiment
- Active: 1971 – present
- Country: India
- Allegiance: India
- Branch: Indian Army
- Type: Armoured Corps
- Size: Regiment
- Nicknames: The Chhamb Knights; The Little Giant
- Mottos: विवेक, वीरता, विजय ’Vivek, Veerta, Vijay’ (Wisdom, Bravery and Victory)
- Equipment: T-90 tanks
- Battle honours: Chhamb, Jammu and Kashmir 1971

Commanders
- Colonel of the Regiment: Lieutenant General PP Singh
- Notable commanders: Lt Gen PPS Bhandari, PVSM, AVSM

Insignia
- Abbreviation: 72 Armd Regt

72 Armoured Regiment is an armoured regiment of the Indian Army.

== Formation ==
The regiment was raised on 1 July 1971 at Ahmednagar by Lieutenant Colonel (later Brigadier) IJ Chopra. It has a squadron each of Jats, Dogras and Rajputs.

== Equipment ==
The regiment was equipped with the T-55 tanks at raising. It is presently equipped with the T-90 main battle tanks.

== Operations ==
Indo-Pakistani War of 1971

The regiment took part in the 1971 Indo-Pak war on the western front in the Chhamb sector of Jammu and Kashmir under 3 Independent Armoured Brigade of 10 Infantry Division. Between 4 and 11 December 1971, the regiment was involved in the fierce battle of Chhamb at Phagla, Mandiala Heights, Gurah, Goghi and Darh crossing. It destroyed 32 enemy tanks and lost 8 of its.

The regiment lost two officers (Major Amarjit Singh and Captain Mohan Lal Safaya) and six other ranks during the battle. It was awarded the battle honour Chhamb and the theatre honour Jammu and Kashmir 1971.

Operation Parakram

The regiment participated in Operation Parakram and showed exemplary professionalism.

== Achievements ==
Lance Dafadar Kartar Singh was awarded Vir Chakra, while Capt Amarjit Singh Mann, Lance Dafadar Bhagwan Dass Sharma and Lance Dafadar Dharmabir Singh were mentioned in despatches for their acts of gallantry during the 1971 war.

The Regiment was presented the ‘President’s Standards’ on 16 December 1994 at Suratgarh by the then President of India Dr Shankar Dayal Sharma.

== Regimental Insignia ==
The Regimental badge comprises two crossed lances with pennons, the numeral '72' placed at the crossing of the lances and a scroll at the base with the Regimental Motto in Devanagari script.

The motto of the Regiment is 'विवेक, वीरता, विजय' (Vivek, Veerta, Vijay), which translates to 'Wisdom, Bravery and Victory'.
