= Bhandari Ram =

Indian recipient of the Victoria Cross (1919–2002)

Subedar Major and Honorary Captain Bhandari Ram VC
- Born: 24 July 1919; Pargna Gugeda, Bilaspur district, Himachal Pradesh, India
- Died: 19 May 2002 (aged 82); Auhar, Himachal Pradesh
- Military career
- Allegiance: British India; India
- Branch: British Indian Army; Indian Army
- Service years: 1941–1969
- Rank: Subedar Major and Honorary Captain
- Units: 16th Battalion, 10th Baluch Regiment; Dogra Regiment
- Conflicts: World War II; Burma campaign
- Awards: Victoria Cross; Param Vishisht Seva Medal (India)

Bhandari Ram, VC, (24 July 1919 – 19 May 2002) was an Indian recipient of the Victoria Cross, the highest and most prestigious award for gallantry in the face of the enemy that can be awarded to British and Commonwealth forces.

== Details ==
Ram was born on 24 July 1919, in a Brahmin family at the village of Serva Geharwin, which was part of Bilaspur State (now Bilaspur district, Himachal Pradesh). He was Sepoy in the 16th Battalion 10th Baluch Regiment, British Indian Army (now the Baloch Regiment, Pakistan Army), fighting against the Japanese Army in the Burmese Campaign during World War II, when he performed deeds during the Third Arakan Offensive for which he was awarded the VC.

The citation reads:

The KING has been graciously pleased to approve the award of the VICTORIA CROSS to:-

No. 24782 Sepoy Bhandari Ram, 10th Baluch Regiment, Indian Army.

On the 22nd November, 1944, in East Mayu, Arakan, during a Company attack on a strongly held Japanese bunker position, Sepoy Bhandari Ram was in the leading section of one of the platoons. In order to reach its objective, his platoon had to climb a precipitous slope, by way of a narrow ridge with sheer sides.

When fifty yards from the top, the platoon came under heavy and accurate light machine gun fire. Three men were wounded, amongst them Sepoy Bhandari Ram, who received a burst of light machine gun fire in his left shoulder and a wound in his leg. The platoon was pinned down by the intense enemy fire.

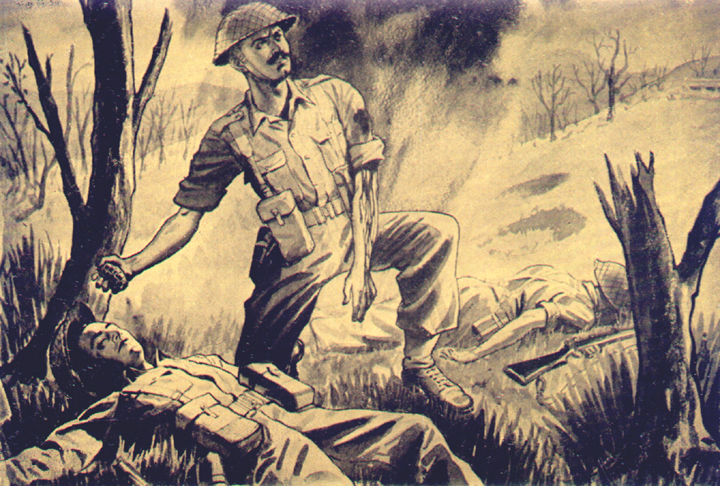
Action by Sepoy Bhandari Ram, 22 November 1944, Arakan, Burma

This Sepoy then crawled up to the Japanese light machine gun, whilst in full view of the enemy, and approached to within fifteen yards of the enemy position. The enemy then hurled grenades at him, seriously wounding him in the face and chest. Undeterred, severely wounded by bullets and grenade splinters and bespattered with blood, this Sepoy, with superhuman courage and determination, crawled up to within five yards of his objective. He then threw a grenade into the position, killing the enemy gunner and two other men, and continued his crawl to the post. Inspired by his example, the Platoon rushed up and captured the position. It was only after the position had been taken that he lay down and allowed his wounds to be dressed.

By his cool courage, determination to destroy the enemy at all cost, and entire disregard for his personal safety, this young Sepoy enabled his Platoon to capture what he knew to be the key to the whole enemy position.

— London Gazette, 8 February 1945.

He continued to serve in the post-independence Indian Army, receiving promotion to subedar on 13 May 1958, and to subedar major on 30 March 1967. Bhandari Ram retired from the army in August 1969 with the honorary rank of captain. He died in 2002.

== Awards ==

| Param Vishisht Seva Medal | General Service Medal 1947 | Samanya Seva Medal | Samar Seva Star |
| Raksha Medal | Indian Independence Medal | 20 Years Long Service Medal | 9 Years Long Service Medal |
| Victoria Cross | 1939–45 Star | Burma Star | War Medal 1939-1945 |
| India Service Medal | Queen Elizabeth II Coronation Medal | Queen Elizabeth II Silver Jubilee Medal | Queen Elizabeth II Golden Jubilee Medal |
