= 127th Baluch Light Infantry =

Historical colonial army unit

127th (Queen Mary's Own) Baluch Light Infantry
- Active: 1903 - 1922
- Country: (British Raj) British India
- Branch: British Indian Army
- Type: Infantry
- Size: 2 Battalions
- Nickname: Capital Campaigners
- Uniform: Green; faced red; red trousers
- Engagements: Indian Rebellion of 1857; Abyssinian Campaign 1868; Second Afghan War 1879-80; Third Burmese War 1885-87; British East Africa 1897-99; First World War (Persia, German East Africa, Palestine)

Commanders
- Colonel-in-Chief: Queen Mary

The 127th (Queen Mary's Own) Baluch Light Infantry was an infantry regiment of the British Indian Army raised in 1844 as The Scinde Bellochee Corps. It was designated as the 127th Baluch Light Infantry in 1903 and became 3rd Battalion (Queen Mary's Own) 10th Baluch Regiment in 1922. In 1947, it was allocated to the Pakistan Army, where it continues to exist as the 10th Battalion of The Baloch Regiment.

== Early history ==
In 1843, the British conquered Sindh after defeating the ruling confederacy of Baloch chieftains. General Sir Charles Napier, the British commander, was much impressed by the ferocious courage of his Balochi opponents and decided to recruit two irregular battalions of Bombay Army for local service within Sindh. The first of these was raised at Karachi as the Scinde Bellochee Corps or the Bellochee Battalion by Major F. Jackson in 1844. Its manpower was mostly drawn from Balochis, Sindhis and Pathans from Sindh. Later, it also recruited Brahuis and Punjabi Muslims, while the recruitment area was extended to include Baluchistan, North-West Frontier Province and the Punjab. On the raising of the 2nd Battalion in 1846, the regiment was designated as the 1st Belooch Battalion. When the Indian Mutiny broke out in 1857, the 1st Belooch Battalion under Lieutenant Colonel Farquhar was dispatched across the Sindh desert to join the Delhi Field Force. It was engaged in several actions during the siege and capture of Delhi. During the next two years, it fought in numerous engagements in Oudh and Rohilkhand, as the British systematically stamped out all resistance. The regiment was brought into line for its services in North India as the 27th Regiment of Bombay Native Infantry or the 1st Belooch Regiment. In 1868, it took part in the long and arduous Expedition to Abyssinia. The splendid performance of 1st Belooch Regiment in Abyssinia was much appreciated and as a reward, it was converted into Light Infantry. In 1879-80, the 1st Beloochees participated in the Second Afghan War, followed by the Third Burmese War of 1885-87, where they earned the nickname of Capital Campaigners for their excellent performance. In 1897-99, the regiment was sent to British East Africa to quell an insurgency in areas now forming Uganda.

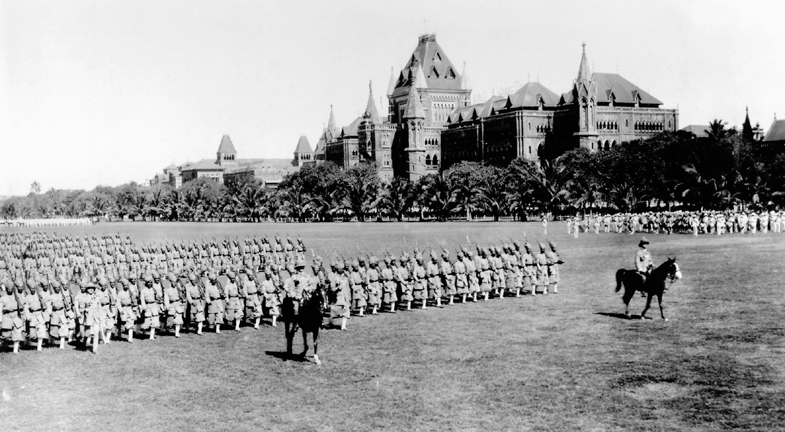
127th (Queen Mary's Own) Baluch Light Infantry on parade, Bombay 1911.

== 127th (Queen Mary's Own) Baluch Light Infantry ==
Subsequent to the reforms brought about in the Indian Army by Lord Kitchener in 1903, all former Bombay Army units had 100 added to their numbers. Consequently, the regiment's designation was changed to 127th Baluch Light Infantry. In 1906, the Princess of Wales (later Queen Mary) was appointed Colonel-in-Chief of the regiment. The regimental full dress uniform in 1914 included a rifle green turban and kurta (knee length tunic) piped in red, worn with red trousers and white gaiters. The red trousers were a distinctive feature of all five Baluch infantry regiments then serving in the Indian Army. On the outbreak of the First World War, the regiment served in German East Africa and Persia. In 1918, it raised the 2nd Battalion 127th (Queen Mary's Own) Baluch Light Infantry, which served in the Palestine and took part in the Battle of Megiddo that led to the defeat of the Turkish Army in Palestine. The 2nd Battalion was disbanded in 1921.

== Subsequent History ==
In 1922, the regiment was grouped with five other Baluch battalions: 1st & 2nd Battalions of 124th Duchess of Connaught's Own Baluchistan Infantry, 126th Baluchistan Infantry, 129th Duke of Connaught's Own Baluchis and the 130th King George's Own Baluchis (Jacob's Rifles), to form the 10th Baluch Regiment. The 127th (Queen Mary's Own) Baluch Light Infantry was redesignated as the 3rd Battalion (Queen Mary's Own) 10th Baluch Regiment. During the Second World War, 3/10th Baluch served in Iran, Iraq, North Africa, Sicily, Italy and Greece. In 1946, it was selected for conversion into an airborne battalion, but the events of 1947 intervened and on the Partition of India, the battalion, along with the Baluch Regiment was allocated to Pakistan Army. In 1956, on the merger of 8th Punjab and Bahawalpur Regiments with the Baluch Regiment, 3 Baluch was redesignated as 10 Baluch (now 10 Baloch). During the Indo-Pakistani Wars of 1965 and 1971, the battalion fought with distinction in Kashmir and took part in the capture of Chhamb in 1971.

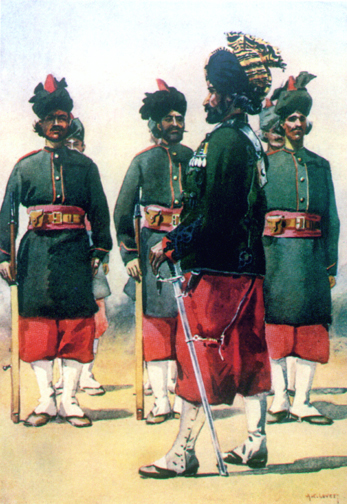
127th (Queen Mary's Own) Baluch Light Infantry. Watercolour by Major AC Lovett, c. 1910.

== Genealogy ==
- 1844 - Bellochee Battalion or The Scinde Bellochee Corps
- 1846 - 1st Bellochee Battalion
- 1858 - 1st Belooch Extra Battalion Bombay Native Infantry
- 1859 - 1st Belooch Regiment Bombay Native Infantry
- 1861 - 27th Regiment Bombay Native Infantry or 1st Belooch Regiment
- 1871 - 27th Regiment Bombay Native (Light) Infantry or 1st Belooch Regiment
- 1885 - 27th Regiment Bombay (Light) Infantry or 1st Belooch Regiment
- 1888 - 27th Regiment (1st Belooch Battalion) Bombay (Light) Infantry
- 1892 - 27th Regiment (1st Baluch Battalion) Bombay (Light) Infantry or 27th Baluchis
- 1901 - 27th Baluch Light Infantry
- 1903 - 127th Baluch Light Infantry
- 1906 - 127th Princess of Wales's Own Baluch Light Infantry
- 1910 - 127th (Queen Mary's Own) Baluch Light Infantry
- 1918 - 1st Battalion 127th (Queen Mary's Own) Baluch Light Infantry
- 1921 - 127th (Queen Mary's Own) Baluch Light Infantry
- 1922 - 3rd Battalion (Queen Mary's Own) 10th Baluch Regiment or 3/10th Baluch
- 1945 - 3rd Battalion (Queen Mary's Own) The Baluch Regiment or 3 Baluch
- 1946 - 3rd (Para) Battalion (Queen Mary's Own) The Baluch Regiment
- 1947 - 3rd Battalion (Queen Mary's Own) The Baluch Regiment
- 1956 - 10th Battalion The Baluch Regiment or 10 Baluch
- 1991 - 10th Battalion The Baloch Regiment or 10 Baloch
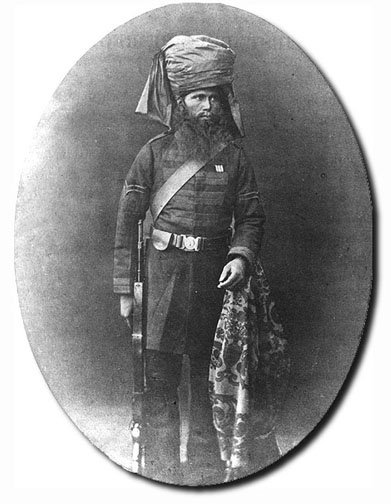
  Lance Naik Wazeer Khan (a Balochi from Rind tribe), 27th Bombay Native Infantry, c. 1865.

== See also ==
- 10th Baluch Regiment
- The Baloch Regiment
- Siege of Delhi
- 1868 Expedition to Abyssinia
- British East Africa 1897-99
