= William Alexander Kerr =

Scottish soldier, writer and recipient of the Victoria Cross

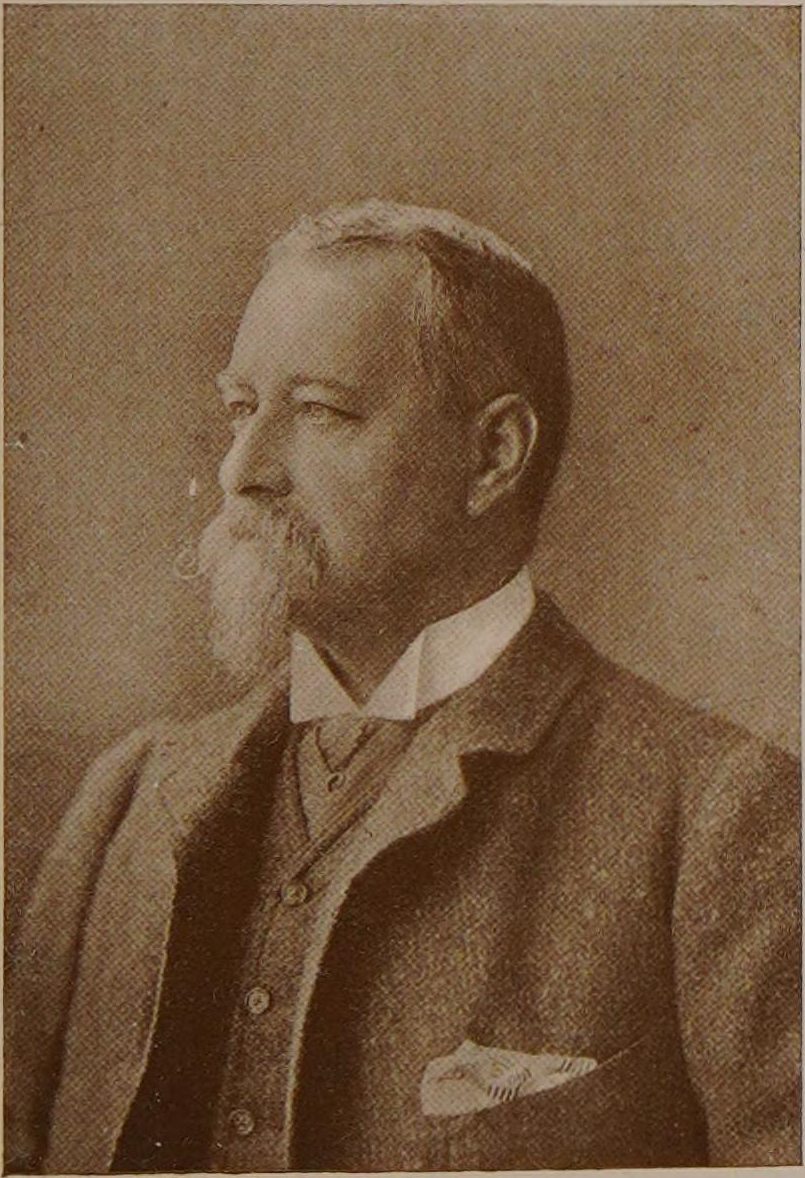
- Photograph by Lowestoft Broughton, c. 1904
- Born: 18 July 1831; Melrose, Scottish Borders
- Died: 21 May 1919 (aged 87); Folkestone, Kent
- Burial place: Cheriton Road Cemetery, Folkestone
- Military career
- Allegiance: United Kingdom
- Branch: Bombay Army
- Service years: 1849–1860
- Rank: Captain
- Units: 24th Bombay Native Infantry
- Conflicts: Indian Mutiny
- Awards: Victoria Cross; Mentioned in Despatches

William Alexander Kerr, VC (18 July 1831 – 21 May 1919) was a Scottish soldier, writer and a recipient of the Victoria Cross, the highest award for gallantry in the face of the enemy that can be awarded to British and Commonwealth forces.

== Details ==
Kerr was a 25 year old lieutenant in the 24th Bombay Native Infantry (now 6th Battalion The Baloch Regiment, Pakistan Army) who was serving with the Southern Mahratta Horse during the Indian Mutiny, when the following deed took place on 10 July 1857 at Kolapore, India for which he was awarded the Victoria Cross (VC):

24th Bombay Native Infantry. Lieutenant William Alexander Kerr. Date of Act of Bravery, 10th July, 1857.

On the breaking out of a mutiny in the 27th Bombay Native Infantry in July, 1857, a party of the mutineers took up a position in the stronghold, or paga, near the town of Kolapore, and defended themselves to extremity. Lieutenant Kerr, of the Southern Mahratta Irregular Horse, took a prominent share of the attack on the position, and at the moment when its capture was of great public importance, he made a dash at one of the gateways, with some dismounted horsemen, and forced an entrance by breaking down the gate. The attack was completely successful, and the defenders were either killed, wounded, or captured, a result that may with perfect justice be attributed to Lieutenant Kerr's dashing and devoted bravery.

(Letter from the Political Superintendent at Kolapore, to the Adjutant-General of the Army, dated 10th September, 1857.)

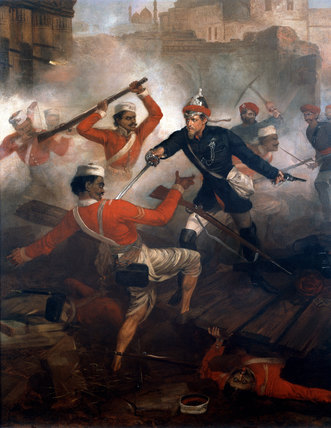
Lieutenant William Alexander Kerr, 24th Bombay Native Infantry, winning the Victoria Cross near Kolapore, July 1857. Oil on canvas by Chevalier Louis-William Desanges, c. 1859.

Kerr attended Loretto School. He achieved the rank of captain. His VC is on display at the Lord Ashcroft Gallery, Imperial War Museum, London.
