= 19th Battalion, Baloch Regiment =

19th Battalion The Baloch Regiment
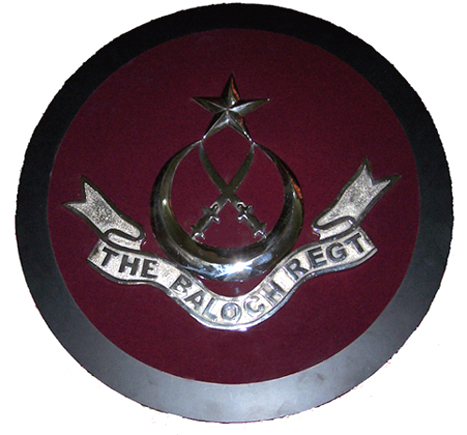
- Active: 1942–1965; 1969 - Present
- Country: Pakistan
- Branch: Pakistan Army
- Type: Infantry
- Role: Light Anti Tank
- Nickname: Mother of SSG
- Motto: Alquadri
- Colors: Rifle green; faced cherry
- Engagements: World War II; Indo-Pakistan War 1948; Indo-Pakistan War 1971

Commanders
- Colonel of the Battalion: Brigadier Salim Ashraf, SI (M)
- Notable commanders: Major General Abrar Husain, HJ, MBE; Major General AO Mitha, HJ, SPk, SQA; Brigadier AQ Sher, HJ

19th Battalion The Baloch Regiment is one of the oldest Light Anti-Tank Regiment of Pakistan Army. Initially raised as the Machine Gun Battalion of 10th Baluch Regiment in 1942, it was first designated as 53rd Regiment, Indian Armoured Corps and then re-designated as 17/10th Baluch. This unit has the unique honour of being the parent unit of Pakistan Army's special forces known as Special Service Group. Prominent officers including General Mirza Aslam Beg, General Pervez Musharraf have served in the unit and Maj Gen Abrar Hussain and Maj Gen Aboobaker Osman Mitha also known as AO Mitha have commanded this unit.

== History ==
=== 17/10th Baluch ===
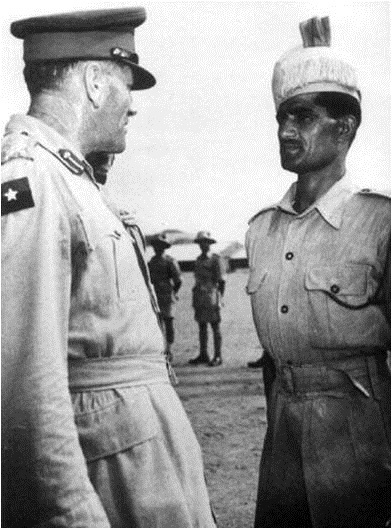
Field Marshal Claude Auchinleck, C-in-C Indian Army, inspecting 17/10th Baluch, Bisitun, Persia, 1945

19 Baloch originally formed part of old 10th Baluch Regiment Group, which was raised in 1820. To cater for the ever-growing demand of troops, the group was expanded during World War II and a number of battalions were added, including 17/10th Baluch, which was raised on 15 April 1942 at Karachi by Lt Col C J D Tomkins.

==== World War II ====
After its raising, the battalion was involved in famine relief duties in Bengal. From there, it moved to Persia as part of Persia and Iraq (PAI) Force] to Bisitun in Persia. In Persia the battalion performed protection duties.

==== Post World War II Moves ====
From Persia, 17 Baluch (in 1945, '10' was dropped from the designation of Baluch Regiment) was dispatched to Dodecanese Islands (Greece) on 21 Dec 1945 and deployed at Rhodes as the garrison battalion. From there it was sent to Benghazi, Tobruk and finally Cyrenaica in August 1946. It left Cyrenaica in January 1947, via Suez for India, arriving at Bombay on 16 February 1947. The battalion was stationed at Poona up to Aug 1947.

==== First Kashmir War ====
The battalion took part in Kashmir Operation in Bagh Sector under 102 Brigade. On 20 Jul 1948, C Company of 19 Baloch along with D Company of 11 Baloch captured Point 9178, during the operation which culminated in the capture of Pandu. The battalion guarded a frontage of 60 km from Chattar to Dara Haji Pir. Lance Havildar Lal Khan of this unit was awarded Tamgha-e-Jurat for gallantry in the capture of Point 9178.

==== Commanding Officers 17/10th Baluch ====
Serial no	Name	Duration
1	Lt Col CJD Tomkins	16 Jan 42 - 7 Mar 43
2	Lt Col LVS Sherwood, DSO	8 Mar 43 - 23 Aug 44
3	Lt Col H Goring	24 Aug 44 - 23 May 45
4	Lt Col GC Bradbury	24 May 45 - 8 Aug 47
5	Maj Nisi Kanta Chatterji (Chatters)	9 Aug 47 - 17 Nov 47
6	Lt Col Safdar Ali*	18 Nov 47 - 25 Feb 50
7	Lt Col Abrar Husain, MBE**	26 Feb 50 -20 Mar 51
8	Lt Col SJB Irani*	21 Mar 51 - 22 Jan 52
9	Lt Col AQ Sher*	23 Jan 52 - 16 Jul 53
10	Lt Col SM Hayat Qaisrani*	17 Jul 53 - 27 Sep 53

=== 19 Baluch (Special Service Group) ===
The battalion was earmarked for conversion into Special Service Group in 1956. 17th Battalion The Baluch Regiment and 312 Garrison Company (SSG) were amalgamated and the battalion was renamed as 19th Battalion The Baluch Regiment (SSG). A selection test was held for all officers and men of the old 17 Baluch desirous of remaining with 19 Baluch (SSG). Majority of men were weeded out in the tough physical tests. Remaining members along with volunteers raised Quaid Company of SSG, which later became part of 1 Commando Battalion.

==== Commanding Officers - 19 Baluch (SSG) ====
Serial no	Name	Duration
1	Lt Col A O Mitha**, TPk	28 Sep 55 - 24 Jun 61
2	Lt Col Muhammad Aslam, MC**	25 Jun 61 - 5 Jan 64
3	Col SG Mehdi, M.C	6 Jan 64 - 30 Aug 65

=== Suspended Animation ===
It remained SSG Battalion for 13 years, till August 1965, when the scope of Special Service Group was expanded from battalion size to that of an operational group and 19 Baluch went into suspended animation.

=== 19 Baluch (Reconnaissance & Support) ===
As part of the expansions carried out in the late 1960s, 19 Baluch was re-raised as a Reconnaissance & Support (R&S) Battalion on 14 Mar 1969 at Baluch Regimental Centre (BRC) Abbottabad. Lt Col Muhammad Ilyas was posted as its commanding officer with a major portion of other officers coming from 5 Baluch. Captain Shahbaz (later colonel) was the first officer to report at BRC and was appointed as Signal Officer of the battalion. Capt Amman Ullah Cheema also joined from 5 Baluch and was later to become Adjutant of the battalion during 1971 war and a hero of attack on Thako Chak in the Battle of Chhamb.

==== 1971 War - Battle of Chhamb ====
During 1971 war, all the R&S Companies took part in the war under their respective brigades in the Battle of Chhamb. Jalil Force named after the then Commanding Officer Lt Col Abdul Jalil took up defense in Nadala enclave near Surkhpur.

===== Battalion HQ - Thako Chak =====
Using elements of battalion headquarters, the adjutant, Captain Amman Ullah Cheema raided the Indian post at Thako Chak which was being manned by 16 (Patiala) Punjab of Indian Army. The post was taken with minimum casualties and was held till the end of the war despite a strong enemy counter-attack on 15 December. The post was so fiercely defended that Indians assumed tanks to be present there. Needless to say, Indian 16 Punjab's attack was repulsed while inflicting heavy casualties on the enemy. In the aftermath of Simla Agreement when both the army chiefs met at Lahore to demarcate the border, a breakdown in talks occurred on the Thako Chak issue. 19 Baluch (R&S) captured this salient in the Jammu Sector; a part lay across the international border and another across the ceasefire line. The Simla Agreement required this minor salient to be divided between India and Pakistan. Although this seemed pointless to India, it became a matter of principle for Pakistan. Talks dragged on endlessly. Ultimately, India resolved this problem by compensating Pakistan elsewhere along the Line of Control.

===== A Company =====
At the outbreak of hostilities, this company was part of Minto Force (named after Lt Col Minto, CO 26 Cavalry) and was placed under the command of 4 Azad Kashmir Brigade. This force consisted of 12 Independent Squadron, Squadron ex 26 Cavalry, Company R&S ex 19 Baluch and Rear HQ of 26 Cavalry.

===== B Company =====
The company went under comd 20 Brigade. The company along with 23 Baluch played an important role in the capture of Chhamb.

===== C Company =====
The company was under the command of 111 Brigade. The important actions undertaken by the company are:

- Capture of Paur Post along with a troop of tanks of 26 Cavalry on the morning of 4 December 1971.
- Advance to and fight on the Phagla Ridge with a squadron of tanks of 26 Cavalry on the morning of 6 December 71.
- Attack on Dhar and Palatan on the night 10–11 December 1971.

===== D Company =====
The company underwent frequent changes of brigades. The main action in which it took part under 4 AK Brigade, was the action of Mandiala Ridges. In this action, the company advanced from a bridgehead across River Tawi followed by a squadron of tanks ex 11 Cavalry on the morning of 5 December 1971. The force got ambushed and was completely pinned down having suffered the loss of seven Recoilless Rifles and two Machine Guns.

=== 19 Baluch (Standard Infantry Battalion) ===
In 1972, a dearth of standard infantry battalions (SIB) had developed and not enough troops were available to hold forward defended localities (FDLs). As a consequence, 19 Baluch (R&S) was converted into foot infantry in 1972 and underwent conversion training in its area of responsibility. The unit occupied Mandiala Ridges along Line of Control in its new role. In 1973, the battalion was re-converted into R&S Battalion.

=== 19 Baloch (Light Anti Tank) ===
The battalion was re-designated and reorganized as a Light Anti Tank (LAT) Battalion in May 1991. This reorganization was part of Pakistan Army's overall reforms introduced in that year. Apart from reorganization in the company strengths, newer weapon systems such as Baktar Shikan were also introduced. In 1991, the spelling of 'Baluch' was changed to 'Baloch.'

=== Affiliation with SSG ===
Due to old affiliation with SSG, the battalion was affiliated with 1 Commando Battalion and redesignated as 19 Baloch (SSG) in April 1998. This was largely due to the efforts of Lt Col Wasif Sajjad, the commanding officer, who had himself served in SSG.

== Raising Day ==
Raising day is celebrated on 11 April, commemorating the re-raising of the battalion at Abbottabad in 1969.

== Colonels of the Battalion ==
After the unit was reorganized in 1969 and redesignated as 19 Baluch, Colonel Abdul Rauf, TBt, was appointed the first Colonel of the Battalion. He remained on this prestigious appointment for two terms. He was succeeded by Major General Muhammad Azam, who also served for two terms. On completion of his tenure, Brigadier Salim Ashraf, SI (M), took over as the new Colonel of the Battalion in August 2010.

== Martyrs ==
During the war of 1965 officers and men who laid down their lives in the line of duty while serving in SSG are included in unit's list of martyrs. Apart from the War of 1971, unit also lost men to the floods of 1973, who despite rising waters did not vacate their posts on Mandiala Ridges.

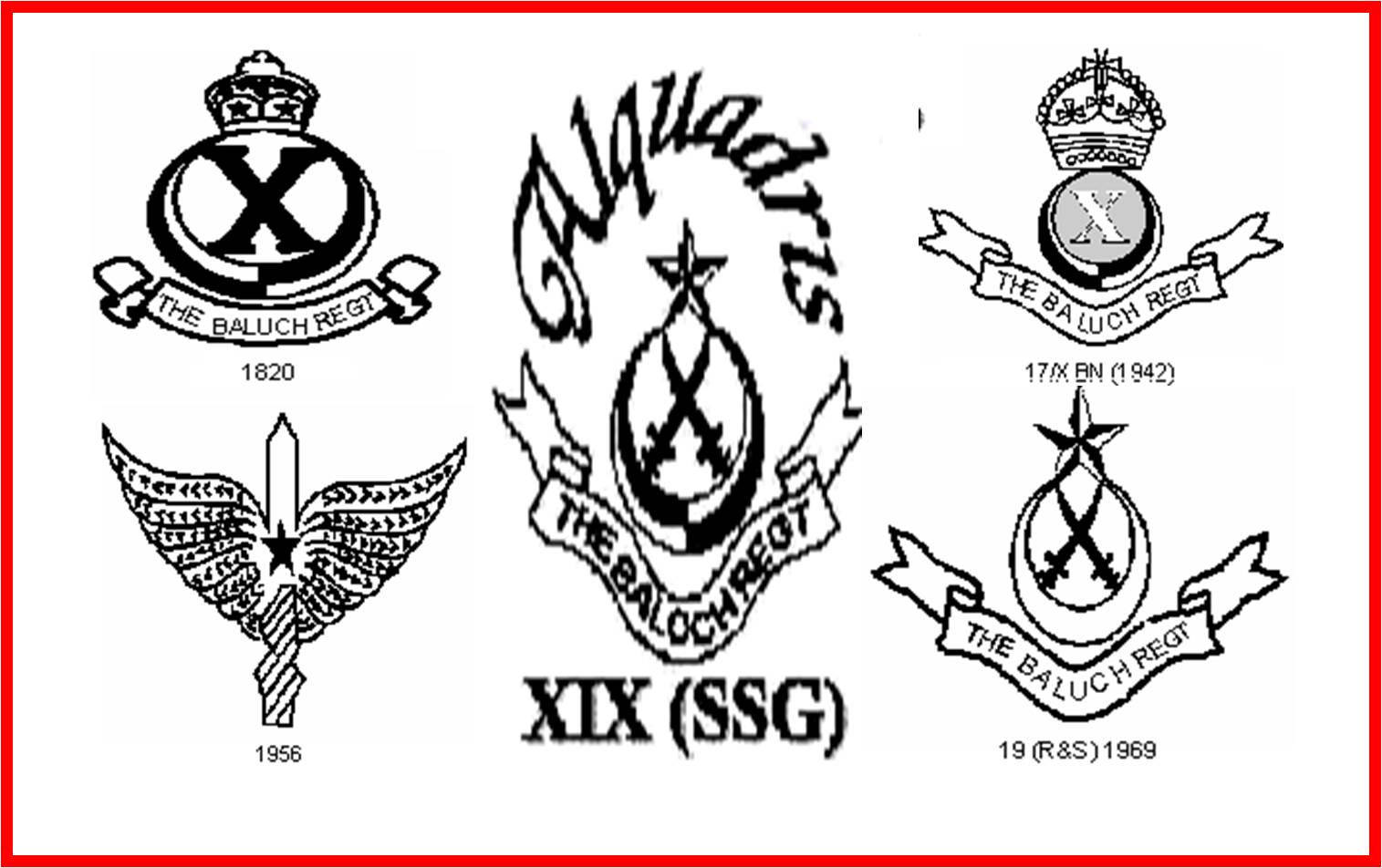
Top left and right are the pagri & beret badges of 10th Baluch Regiment from 1945-56. Bottom left is the commando's wing of SSG. Bottom right is the badge of Baluch Regiment since 1959. In the centre is the regimental badge with the motto of 19 Baloch (SSG)

=== War of 1965 ===
Serial no	Name	Parent Arm/Corps
1	Maj Muhammad Sarwar	Armoured Corps
2	Capt Nisar Ahmed, SJ	Engineers
3	Capt Muhammad Sadiq, SJ	Artillery
4	Naib Subedar Nazir Ahmed	Baloch
5	Hav Muhammad Riaz	Signals
6	Hav Muhammad Bashir	Punjab
7	Hav Abbass Ali, TJ	Baloch
8	Hav Khan Muhammad	Frontier Force
9	Nk Adalat Hussain	Punjab
10	Nk Shabbir Hussain	Punjab
11	L/Nk Mukhtar Ahmed, TJ	Punjab
12	L/Nk Muhammad Asghar	Artillery
13	L/Nk Qamarudin Ahmed	Signals
14	Swr Muhammad Haleem, TJ	Armoured Corps
15	Swr Muhammad Asghar	Armoured Corps
16	L/Nk Muzaffar Khan, TJ	Baloch
17	OCU Muhammad Hussain	Artillery
18	Sep Ahmed Shah	Artillery
19	OCU Muzzamil Hussain	Artillery
20	Gnr Khan Afsar	Artillery
21	Sep Muhammad Rashid	Artillery
22	Spr Muhammad Sadiq	Engineers
23	Spr Munsaf Khan	Engineers
24	Sep Muhammad Aslam	Punjab
25	Swr Muhammad Baksh	Punjab
26	Sep Chan Pir Shah	Baloch
27	Sep Muhammad Ayub	Baloch
28	Sep Haider Gul	Frontier Force
29	Sep Muhammad Saleem	Frontier Force
30	Sep Feroze Ali	AMC

=== War of 1971 ===
The following brave men of 19 Baluch (R&S) laid down their lives in the line of duty while fighting in the Battle of Chhamb

Serial no	Name
1	L/Hav Muhammad Azam
2	L/Nk Sher Khan
3	Sep Muhammad Ashiq
4	Sep Muhtamim Shah
5	Sep Muhammad Nawab
6	Sep Fazal Hussain
7	Sep Muhammad Ishaq
8	Sep Alif Din

=== 1973 Floods ===
During the floods of 1973, 19 Baluch was occupying posts on Mandiala Ridges. After the initial flood outbreak, more than 100 troops were reported missing. However, after the initial chaos had abated and communications re-established, losses were calculated to be much less. The casualties of the 1973 flood were:

Serial no	Name
1	Sub Sher Zaman
2	Hav Naseer Khan
3	L/Hav Mehboob Khan
4	L/Hav Muhammad Younis
5	Nk/Clk Muhammad Sadiq
6	L/Nk Abdul Razzaq
7	Sep Said Bahadur Shah
8	Sep Murad Shah
9	Sep Khan Bahadur Shah
10	Sep Muhammad Siddique
11	Sep Muhammad Aslam
12	Sep Nazir Hussain
13	Sep Muhammad Bashir
14	Sep Nazar Hussain
15	Sep Nazir

== Motto ==
The battalion adopted the motto of "Alquadri" in 1991. Since Qadir is name of Allah, so Alquadri means Allah's or "Allah Wali" in Urdu. Literally it means those who prevail on strength of their power.
