= 10th Baluch Regiment =

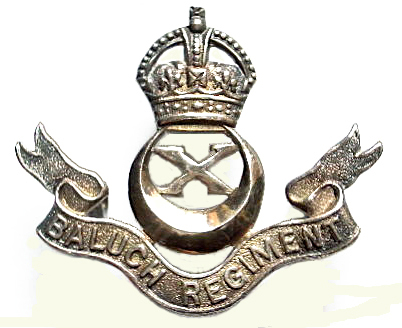
- Active: 1922–1956
- Allegiance: (British Raj) British India (1922 - 47); Pakistan (1947 - 56)
- Branch: British Indian Army; Pakistan Army
- Type: Infantry
- Regimental Centre: Karachi
- Uniform: Rifle Green; faced red
- War Cry: Kai Kai
- Engagements: Expedition to Aden 1839; Anglo-Persian War 1856-57; Indian Rebellion of 1857; Taiping Rebellion 1860-64; Abyssinian Campaign 1868; Second Afghan War 1878-80; Anglo-Egyptian War 1882; Third Burma War 1885-87; British East Africa 1896; British East Africa 1897-99; The Boxer Rebellion 1900; British Somaliland 1908-10; First World War 1914-18; Third Afghan War 1919; Iraqi Revolt 1920; Burmese Rebellion 1931-32; Second World War 1939-45; Kashmir War 1948

Commanders
- Colonel-in-Chief: King George V

Insignia
- War cry: Kai Kai

The 10th Baluch or Baluch Regiment was a regiment of the British Indian Army from 1922 to 1947. After independence, it was transferred to the Pakistan Army. In 1956, it was amalgamated with the 8th Punjab and Bahawalpur Regiments. During more than a hundred years of military service, the 10th Baluch Regiment acquired a distinguished record amongst the regiments of the British Indian Army. Its list of honours and awards includes four Victoria Crosses.

== The Bombay Army ==
The Baluch Regiment originated in the Army of Bombay Presidency in 1844, when Sir Charles Napier raised the 1st Belooch (old spelling of Baluch) Battalion (raised as the Scinde Beloochee Corps and designated as 27th Regiment of Bombay Native Infantry in 1861) for local service in the newly conquered province of Sindh. Two years later, another Belooch battalion was raised (designated as the 29th Regiment of Bombay Native Infantry in 1861), while in 1858, John Jacob raised Jacob's Rifles (30th Regiment of Bombay Native Infantry), which would soon become the 3rd Belooch Regiment. The term 'local' was interpreted fairly loosely when it became necessary to send the 2nd Beloochees to the Persian War in 1856-57, a campaign frequently overshadowed by the events of the Indian Mutiny in 1857. The 1st was in Karachi when the news of the insurrection reached the Commissioner. Sir Bartle Frere dispatched them with all haste, on foot across the Sindh desert in May, to join the siege artillery train on its way to Delhi; the only Bombay unit to join the Delhi Field Force. The regiment was brought into line for its services in North India as the 27th Regiment of Bombay Native Infantry. Meanwhile, the 2nd Beloochees were also regularized as the 29th Regiment. In 1862, the 2nd Beloochees were dispatched to China to suppress the Taiping Rebellion. Two years later, they became some of the first foreign troops to be stationed in Japan, when two companies were sent to Yokohama as a part of the garrison guarding the British legation. The 1st Beloochees greatly distinguished themselves in the tough Abyssinian Campaign of 1868 and were made Light Infantry as a reward. All Baloch battalions took part in the Second Afghan War of 1878-80, where the Jacob's Rifles suffered heavy casualties at the Battle of Maiwand. The 1st Belooch Regiment again distinguished itself in 1885-87 during the Third Burma War.

In 1891, two battalions of Bombay Infantry also became "Baluchi," when they were reconstituted with Baluchis, Hazaras and Pathans from Baluchistan and localized in the province. The first of these, the 24th (Baluchistan) Infantry was raised in 1820, while the other, 26th (Baluchistan) Infantry was raised in 1825. Following the Kitchener Reforms of 1903, these battalions were redesignated as the 124th Duchess of Connaught's Own Baluchistan Infantry, 126th Baluchistan Infantry, 127th Queen Mary's Own Baluch Light Infantry, 129th Duke of Connaught's Own Baluchis and 130th King George's Own Baluchis (Jacob's Rifles). In 1914, their full dress uniforms included red trousers worn with rifle green or drab tunics.

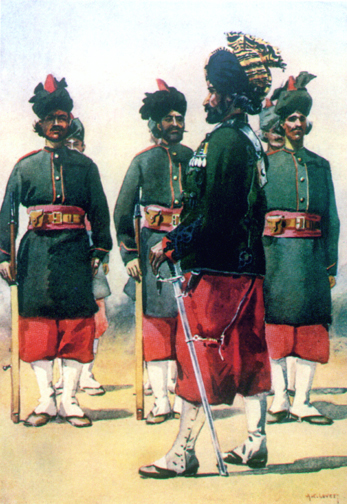
127th Queen Mary's Own Baluch Light Infantry. Watercolour by AC Lovett, c. 1910.

== First World War ==
- 124th Duchess of Connaught's Own Baluchistan Infantry
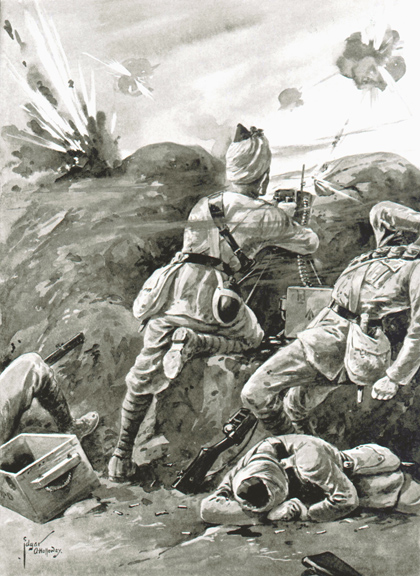
  Sepoy Khudadad Khan, VC, 129th DCO Baluchis, Hollebeke Sector, First Battle of Ypres, 31 October 1914.
  - 1/124th - India, Persia.
  - 2/124th (formed in 1916) - Mesopotamia, Egypt, Palestine, India.
  - 3/124th (formed in 1917) - Persia, India, Mesopotamia.
- 126th Baluchistan Infantry - India, Egypt, Muscat, Aden, Mesopotamia.
- 127th Queen Mary's Own Baluch Light Infantry
  - 1/127th - India, East Africa, Persia.
  - 2/127th (formed in 1918) - India, Egypt, Palestine.
- 129th Duke of Connaught's Own Baluchis
  - 1/129th - India, France, East Africa.
  - 2/129th (formed in 1917) - India, Mesopotamia.
- 130th King George's Own Baluchis (Jacob's Rifles)
  - 1/130th - India, East Africa, Palestine.
  - 2/130th (formed in 1918) - India.

During the First World War, most of the regiments raised second battalions, while the 124th Baluchistan Infantry raised two battalions. Only 2/124th Baluchistan Infantry of the wartime raisings was retained after the post-war reforms.

The 129th DCO Baluchis served on the Western Front in France and Belgium, where they became the first Indian regiment to attack the Germans and the only Indian regiment to fight in both the First & Second Battles of Ypres. At Hollebeke, during the First Ypres, Sepoy Khudadad Khan became the first British Raj soldier to win the Victoria Cross; Britain's highest decoration for valour. Prior to 1911 pre partition Indian soldiers had not been eligible for the Victoria Cross. The battalion would go on to serve with distinction in German East Africa alongside the 127th QMO Baluch Light Infantry and 130th KGO Baluchis. Meanwhile, the 1st and 3rd Battalions of 124th DCO Baluchistan Infantry served in Persia, while the 2nd distinguished itself in Mesopotamia and Palestine.

== Inter-War period ==
After the First World War, a major re-organization of British Indian Army took place. Most of the wartime units were disbanded, while the remaining single-battalion regiments were merged to form large regimental groups of 4-6 battalions each. Among these was the 10th Baluch Regiment, formed in 1922 at Rajkot (Rajasthan) from the five old Baluch battalions and the second battalion of 124th Baluchistan Infantry. The regimental depot later shifted to Karachi. The distinctive rifle green and red uniform of the old Baluch battalions was adopted by the entire regiment. The officers wore a cherry boss surmounted by a silver 'X' on field and forage caps, while the old battalion badges continued to be worn on pagris and helmets by the 1st, 3rd, 4th and 5th Battalions. It was not until 1945 that a single cap badge was adopted by the regiment on introduction of berets during the Second World War. It consisted of a Roman numeral 'X' within a crescent moon, a crown above and title scroll below, all in white metal. The badges of rank were in black metal with red edging, while the lanyard was of rifle green cord with two red runners. Another distinctive feature of Baluchi uniforms were plain silver ball buttons worn on service and mess dresses.

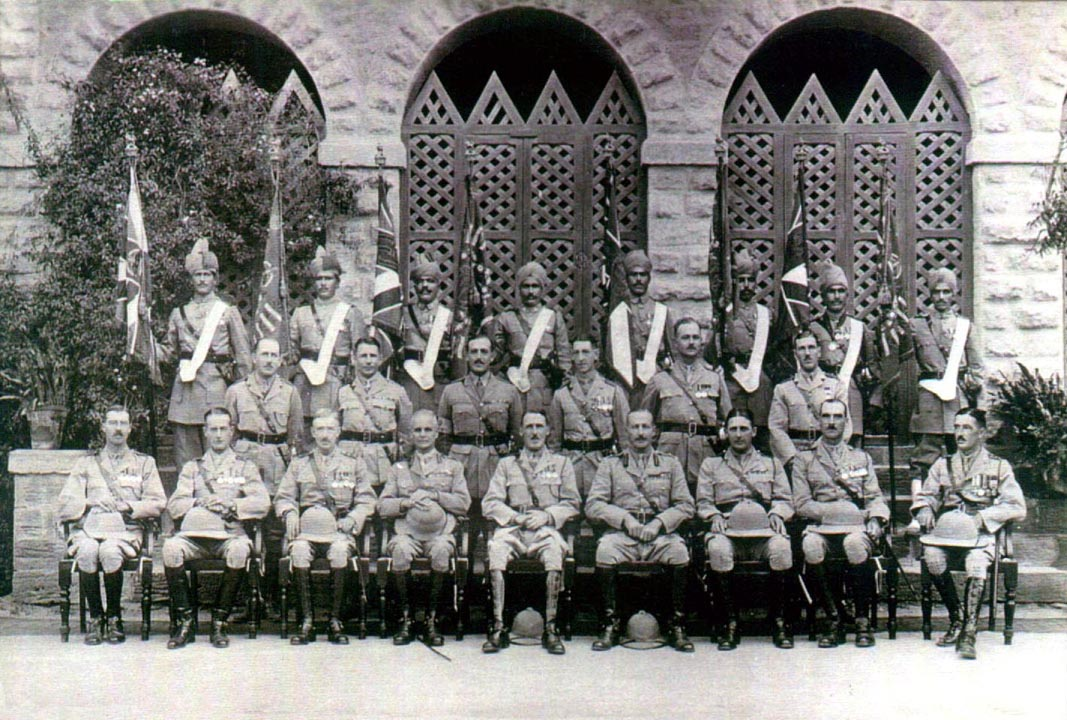
Photograph with Field Marshal Sir William Birdwood, C-in-C in India, on occasion of Colour Presentation to the 1st, 4th, 5th and 10th Battalions of 10th Baluch Regiment. Karachi, 15 November 1929.

The line up of the new regiment was:

- 1st Battalion (DCO) - 124th Duchess of Connaught's Own Baluchistan Infantry.
- 2nd Battalion - 126th Baluchistan Infantry.
- 3rd Battalion (QMO) - 127th Queen Mary's Own Baluch Light Infantry.
- 4th Battalion (DCO) - 129th Duke of Connaught's Own Baluchis.
- 5th Battalion (KGO) - 130th King George's Own Baluchis (Jacob's Rifles).
- 10th (Training) Battalion - 2/124th Duchess of Connaught's Own Baluchistan Infantry.

== Second World War ==
- 1st Battalion - India, Iran, Iraq, Syria, Lebanon.
- 2nd Battalion - India, Malaya. Captured at Singapore in 1942. Reformed in 1946 by redesignation of 9/10th Baluch.
- 3rd Battalion - India, Iran, Iraq, North Africa, Sicily, Italy, Greece.
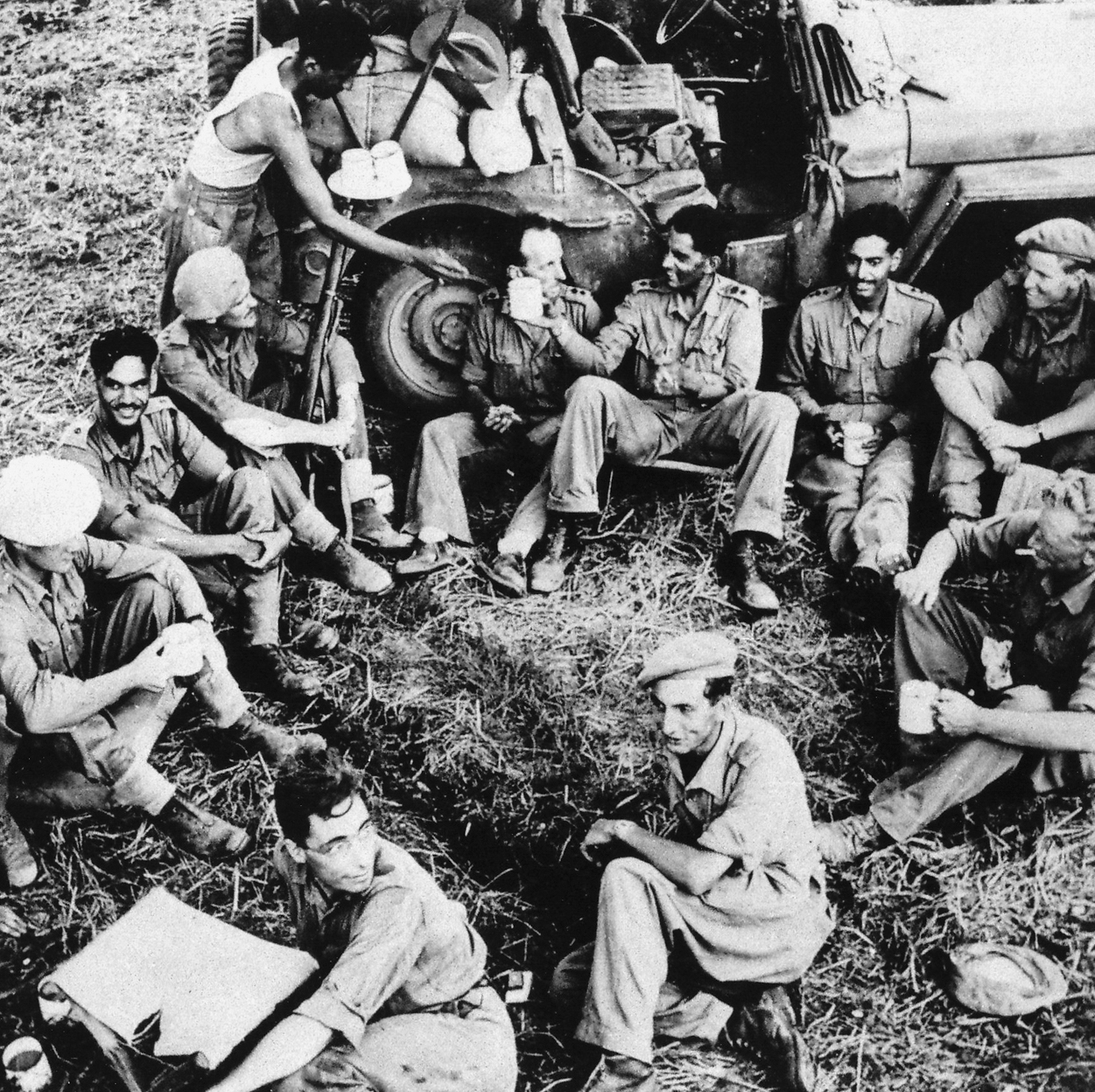
  Officers of 7/10th Baluch after the fall of Pegu, Burma, 1945.
- 4th Battalion - India, Italian East Africa, North Africa, Cyprus, Italy.
- 5th Battalion - India, Burma.
- 6th Battalion - Raised in 1940. India. Disbanded 1947; re-raised 1948.
- 7th Battalion - Raised in 1940. India, Burma.
- 8th Battalion - Raised in 1941. India, Burma. Disbanded 1946; re-raised 1948.
- 9th Battalion - Raised in 1941. India. Redesignated as 2/10th Baluch in 1946.
- 10th Battalion - Converted into Regimental Centre in 1942.
- 14th Battalion - Raised in 1941. India, Burma, Malaya, Siam. Disbanded 1946.
- 15th Battalion - Raised in 1941. Became a training battalion. India. Disbanded 1946.
- 16th Battalion - Raised in 1941. India, Burma, Malaya. Disbanded 1946.
- 17th Battalion - Raised in 1942 by conversion of 53rd Regiment, Indian Armoured Corps. India, Iran, Iraq, Palestine, Greece, Libya.
- 18th Battalion - Raised as 25th Garrison Battalion in 1941. Redesignated as 18/10th Baluch in 1943. India. Disbanded 1944.
- 25th Garrison Battalion - Raised in 1941. On conversion to active status, it was redesignated as 18/10th Baluch in 1943.
- 26th Garrison Battalion - Raised in 1942. India. Disbanded 1946.
- Machine Gun Battalion - Raised on 15 April 1942. Converted into 53rd Regiment, Indian Armoured Corps in August 1942. Redesignated as 17/10th Baluch in November 1942.

The regiment's record of service in the war was once again most impressive. It suffered 6572 casualties and won numerous gallantry awards including two Victoria Crosses to Naik Fazal Din and Sepoy Bhandari Ram - both in the Burma Campaign. Captain Siri Kanth Korla was a company commander of the 7/10th Baluch Regiment who was awarded a Distinguished Service Order, a Military Cross, and two Mentions in Dispatches in the Burma Campaign. Lieutenant Colonel Lionel Protip Sen was awarded the Distinguished Service Order for his command of 16/10 Baluch, as part of the all Indian 51st Indian Infantry Brigade, in the Burma campaign. During the Second World War, the regiment raised another ten battalions, although most of them were disbanded after the war. At the end of 1945, the 10th Baluch Regiment lost its number and became The Baluch Regiment.

== Post-independence ==
At the time of independence, the active battalions were 1st, 2nd, 3rd, 4th, 5th, 7th & 17th. The regiment was allotted to Pakistan. Dogra companies of the Baluch Regiment were transferred to the Indian Army. The Regimental Centre shifted to Quetta in 1947 to make room for the Government offices in the new capital of Pakistan. In 1948, the 6th and 8th Battalions were re-raised in response to the war with India in Kashmir, where the 4th Battalion greatly distinguished itself in the Battle of Pandu. In 1956, major reorganization took place in the Pakistan Army and larger infantry groups were created by amalgamating the existing infantry regiments. As a result, the 8th Punjab and Bahawalpur Regiments were absorbed by the Baluch Regiment (now called the Baloch Regiment). The new line up of the regiment was:

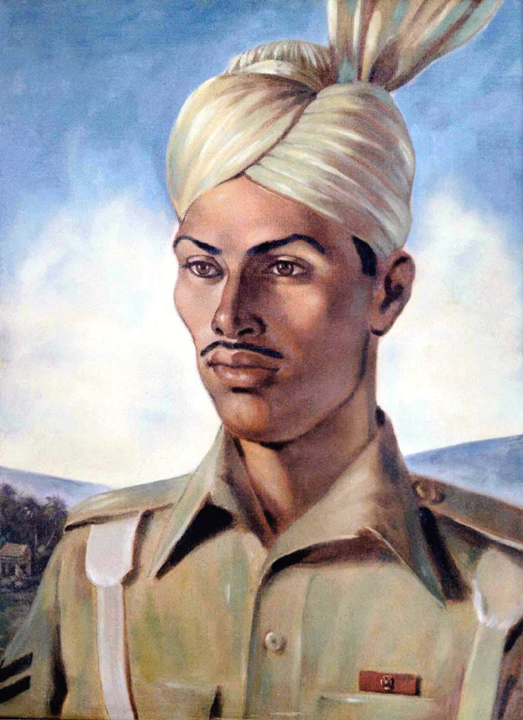
Naik Fazal Din, VC, 7/10th Baluch.

- 1 Baluch - 1/8th Punjab (The Gallant One)
- 2 Baluch - 2/8th Punjab
- 3 Baluch - 3/8th Punjab
- 4 Baluch - 4/8th Punjab (Prince of Wales's Own)
- 5 Baluch - 5/8th Punjab (Burma)
- 6 Baluch - 1 Baluch (Duchess of Connaught's Own)
- 7 Baluch - 2 Baluch
- 8 Baluch - 1 Bahawalpur (Sadiq)
- 9 Baluch - 2 Bahawalpur (Haroon)
- 10 Baluch - 3 Baluch (Queen Mary's Own)
- 11 Baluch - 4 Baluch (Duke of Connaught's Own)
- 12 Baluch - 5 Baluch (King George V's Own) (Jacob's Rifles)
- 13 Baluch - 6/8th Punjab
- 14 Baluch - 6 Baluch
- 15 Baluch - 7 Baluch
- 16 Baluch - 8 Baluch
- 17 Baluch - 8/8th Punjab
- 18 Baluch - 9/8th Punjab
- 19 Baluch (SSG) - 17 Baluch
- 20 Baluch - 3 Bahawalpur (Abbas)
- 21 Baluch - 4 Bahawalpur

== Battle honours ==
- Aden, Reshire, Bushire, Khoosh-ab, Persia, Delhi 1857, Central India, Abyssinia, Kandahar 1880, Afghanistan 1878-80, Tel-el-Kebir, Egypt 1882, Burma 1885–87, British East Africa 1896, British East Africa 1897-99, China 1900.
- World War I: Messines 1914, Armentières 1914, Ypres 1914, Gheluvelt, Festubert 1914, Givenchy 1914, Neuve Chapelle, Ypres 1915, St Julien, France and Flanders 1914–15, Egypt 1915, Megiddo, Sharon, Palestine 1918, Aden, Kut al Amara 1917, Baghdad, Mesopotamia 1916–18, Persia 1915-18, NW Frontier, India 1917, Kilimanjaro, Behobeho, East Africa 1915-18.
- Afghanistan 1919.
- World War II: Gallabat, Barentu, Keren, Massawa, Abyssinia 1940-41, The Cauldron, Mersa Matruh, Ruweisat Ridge, El Alamein, North Africa 1940–43, Landing in Sicily, Sicily 1943, Castel Frentano, Orsogna, Arezzo, Monte Cedrone, Citta di Castello, Gothic Line, Monte Calvo, Pian di Castello, Croce, Gemmano Ridge, San Marino, Monte Farneto, San Paolo-Monte Spaccato, Cesena, Savio Bridgehead, Casa Bettini, Idice Bridgehead, Italy 1943-45, Athens, Greece 1944-45, North Malaya, Machang, Singapore Island, Malaya 1941–42, Kuzeik, North Arakan, Maungdaw, Point 551, Shwebo, Kyaukmyaung Bridgehead, Mandalay, Capture of Meiktila, Defence of Meiktila, The Irrawaddy, Pegu 1945, Sittang 1945, Burma 1942–45.
- Kashmir 1948.

== See also ==
- Baloch Regiment
- Brig Gen John Jacob, CB
- Gen Sir Garrett O'Moore Creagh, VC, GCB, GCSI
- Field Marshal Sir Claud Jacob, GCB, GCSI, KCMG
- Lt Gen Sir Harold Rawdon Briggs, KCIE, KBE, CB, DSO & 2 Bars
- Maj Gen Abrar Hussain, HJ, MBE
- Lt William Alexander Kerr, VC
- Sep Khudadad Khan, VC
- Nk Fazal Din, VC
- Sep Bhandari Ram, VC
- List of regiments of the British Indian Army (1903)
- List of regiments of the British Indian Army (1922)
