= Siege of Nargund =

Siege of Nargund may refer to:

- Siege of Nargund (1778)
- Siege of Nargund (1785)
