= Raja Venkatappa Nayaka =

Indian ruler of the Nayak dynasty

- Raja
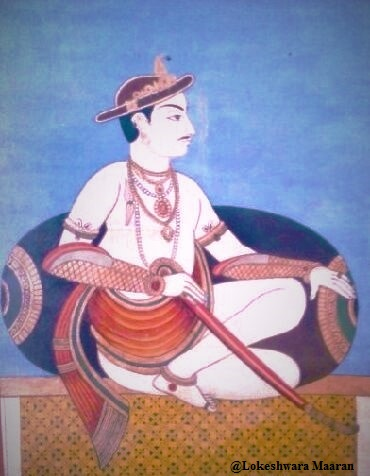
- Portrait of Raja Nalvadi Vekatappa Nayaka of Shorapur in Shorapur Traditional Painting Style, painting from 1857

King
- Reign: 1853 - 1858
- Born: 1843
- Died: 1858 (aged 14–15)
- Dynasty: Nayak Dynasty
- Father: Raja Krishnappa Nayak
- Mother: Rani Eshwaramma
- Religion: Hinduism

Raja Venkatappa Nayaka IV or Nalvadi Raja Venkatappa Nayaka ನಾಲ್ವಡಿ ರಾಜಾ ವೆಂಕಟಪ್ಪ ನಾಯಕ (1843–1858), was a prominent final ruler from the Nayak Dynasty of Shorapur (or Surapur) in present-day Yadgiri district of Karnataka state. He refused to accept the suzerainty of the British East India Company and waged a war against them during the Indian Rebellion of 1857. He also aligned the southern kings to fight against the British and created an alliance consisting of Jattu, Jamkhandi State, Mudhol State, Naragund and Koppal states.

== Biography ==
Venkatappa Nayaka was a devout virashaivite and built several forts in and around Barkur and also established Veerashaiva Mathas at several places. This district was ruled by Valmiki Nayaka's (berad) who had a tough resistance to Aurangzeb. The British appointed Philip Meadows Taylor as its Resident and Regent when the ruler there died, leaving a young prince Venkatappa. Venkatappa Nayaka was educated in English and Taylor had endeared himself to the prince, who addressed Taylor as "Appa".

When the prince started his personal rule, being well educated, he felt the British overlordship very irritating. He was in his early 20s and had sent an agent to Peshwa Nanasaheb II in December 1857. The British heard reports that Venkatappa was planning a revolt on 8 August 1858, and was trying to encourage the British Regiments at Kolhapur, Dharwad and Belgaum to revolt. Two agents trying to sow seeds of dissension in the Belgaum army had been identified on 2 February 1858, and they were dispatched by Venkatappa and Raja of Jamkhandi. Venkatappa had recruited a large number of Arabs and Rohillas. Captain Malcolm posted a contingent at a village near Surapur and another battalion was posted at Sindhanur.

Campbell was sent to Surapur by Malcolm to advise young Venkatappa. On 7 February, the British army near Surapur was attacked and many soldiers were killed by Venkatappa's men. The next day, the British attacked Surapur fort, and the army from Madras led by Colonel Hues was also summoned. Venkatappa's men attacked the Surapur fort killing many British soldiers.

Reinforcements were called from the nearby cantonment site (Chavani) at Lingasugur. But Surapur did not have much force to face the huge British army. Vagangeri Bhimrao from Surapur, a secret agent of the British, advised Venkatappa to go to Hyderabad and seek help from Salar Jung. Venkatappa escaped from the fort and made his way to Hyderabad. The next day, Bhimrao opened the fort door and Surapur was occupied without much resistance.

However, Venkatappa was apprehended at Hyderabad by Salar Jung, and handed over to the British. He was tried and sentenced to life imprisonment. When Taylor met him, Venkatappa told him that:

he did not wish to live and if he was to be sentenced to death, he must not be hanged like a criminal, but killed at the mouth of a cannon. I was not a coward.

Taylor, who had great affection for Venkatappa, had his life term reduced to four years internment by prevailing upon the Governor General, and he was to be reinstated after this four-year term. He was to be taken to Kurnool fort, and was to be interned there together with his two queens. While he was being taken to Kurnool, on an early morning when his armed guard had gone out for ablution, Venkatappa took the revolver his guard had left behind and shot himself dead. Though there are debates over his death, some historians believe that he was stabbed from the back by a British officer and buried near Amberpet, a few miles away from Hyderabad.

== Developmental works ==
Raja Venkatappa Nayaka was instrumental in the construction of water tanks, bunds, wells and water stations. The Mandakini lake and the Lotus Lake near the Surapur fort are credited to him. He initiated measures for soil and land conservation, and encouraged afforestation.
