= Siege of Nargund (1785) =

Part of Maratha-Mysore wars

Coordinates: 15.7261°N 75.3827°E

Second siege of Nargund
- Part of Maratha–Mysore Wars
Date	February 1785
Location	Nargund
Result	Mysore victory
Territorial changes	Nargund annexed to Mysore

Belligerents
Maratha Empire	Kingdom of Mysore

Commanders and leaders
Vyankatrao Bhave	Burhanudhin

The second siege of Nargund was a siege conducted by Tipu Sultan, the Sultan of Mysore, in Nargund in 1785. Tipu Sultan, along with his commander, Burhanudhin, defeated the Marathas and recaptured Nargund.

== Event ==
In 1778, Hyder Ali, the Sultan of Mysore, had successfully besieged the Maratha territory of Nargund. He retained its ruler, Vyankatrao Bhave, as a puppet and forced him to pay tribute.

After the death of Hyder Ali, Bhave refused Tipu Sultan's demand for increased tribute and attempted to rejoin the Marathas, with whom Bhave's loyalty had always lain. Tipu Sultan sent his son-in-law Burhanudhin to recapture Nargund. Burhanudhin trapped Vyankatrao in his fort in February 1785. Vyankatrao eventually surrendered and the territory returned to Mysore rule in July 1785.
