= Bhaskar Rao Bhave =

Ruler of Nargund, India

- Died: 12 June 1858; Belgaum
- Other names: Baba Saheb of Nargund
- Known for: Revolt against the British East India Company

Bhaskar Rao Bhave, also known as Baba Saheb of Nargund, was a Zamindar of Nargund in Gadag district of Karnataka, India, who revolted against British rule during the Indian Rebellion of 1857.

Bhaskar Rao Bhave came to the throne of Nargund in 1842 and was an efficient administrator. He did not have a son and successor and planned to adopt a son as heir. However, under the Doctrine of lapse, the British refused to recognise the adoption, which enraged Baba Saheb. He rallied the support of other local rulers like Mundaragi Bhimaraya, Surpur Venkatappa Nayakaand to lead an insurrection. Baba Saheb was aware of the rebellion in the north and wanted to coordinate his revolt with it. On learning that he had accumulated a large amount of artillery and ammunition in his fort, the British asked him to deposit them in Dharwad. Baba Saheb feigned cooperation and sent the weapons towards Dharwad, but at the same time secretly organised an attack on the convoy and brought them back to Nargund.

In May 1858, when the British sent a large force to Nargund, he attacked the force and killed its commanding officer Manson. He brought Manson's severed head to his fort and displayed it to his people. He then went on to capture the British held Koppaldurg fort. When he attacked the fort of Amargol, the British countered by sending a large force to Nargund. Baba Saheb and his army of 2,500 fought bravely, but several men from his camp betrayed him and joined the British and he was defeated. Baba Saheb escaped to a nearby forest near Torgal, but was betrayed and captured by the British. On 12 June 1858, he was executed in Belgaum.

== In popular culture ==
Bhaskar Rao Bhave was depicted in the Kannada language television serial 'Nargund Baba Saheb'.
