= Siege of Nargund (1778) =

Part of Maratha-Mysore wars

Siege of Nargund 1778
- Part of Maratha–Mysore Wars
Date	1778
Location	Nargund
Result	Mysore victory

Belligerents
Maratha Empire	Mysore

Commanders and leaders
Vyankatrao Bhave	Hyder Ali

The siege of Nargund took place in 1778 when troops from the Sultanate of Mysore attempted to capture the town of Nargund, a possession of the Maratha Confederacy. Hyder Ali defeated Marathas and captured Nargund. Hyder Ali kept its Brahmin ruler, Vyankatrao Bhave, as the ruler of Nargund as long as he paid an annual tribute.

== See also ==
- Second siege of Nargund
