= Nargund =

Naragundd Naragunda
- Town
- Location in Karnataka, India Naragundd (India)
- Coordinates: 15.72°N 75.38°E
- Country: India
- State: Karnataka
- District: Gadag
- Elevation: 605 m (1,985 ft)

Population (2011)
  - Total: 36,291
- Time zone: UTC+5:30 (IST)
- Website: naragundatown.mrc.gov.in/en

Naragunda is a town in Gadag district in the Indian state of Karnataka.

== Geography ==
Nargund has an average elevation of 605 metres (1984 feet).

== Etymology ==
The name "Nargund" comes from "Nari Gundu", which means "Hillock of Foxes" in Kannada. The town is marked by such a hillock right in the centre of town. Although known to be a place full of foxes in the past, it has none now and is pocked with windmills on all sides.

== Nargund Fort ==
Nargund Fort is located on a hill in the center of town. It was created by the Maratha King Chhatrapati Shivaji in 1674. The fort was planned to be challenging for any enemy to capture it. It was established in order to delay annexation by the Mughals of the territory, acting as a stronghold over the area. Unlike other forts in Karnataka, Nargund Fort had no fortresses or multiple floors (storeys). There was no garden or sanctuary inside. Aside from a few ornamental components, the architecture of Nargund Fort was based on bare essentials such as a reservoir, an ammunition storage space, a large well for uninterrupted water supply and watch towers.

As of now, the fort has become a ruin. Most of the structures inside the fort have been destroyed over time. It was under Maratha rulers for 15 years after its creation. In 1692, Mughal emperor Aurangzeb invaded the fort and captured it, by defeating the Maratha army. However, the Marathas recaptured the fort from Mughal rulers under Ramrao Dadaji Bhave in 1705. In the 18th century Nargund Fort along with the surrounding region was under the authority of King Venkat Rao of the Bhave family, which was subservient to the Marathas. The suzerainty of the Maratha rulers over Nargund Fort remained till 1778, when it was captured by the King of Mysore, Hyder Ali. In 1784, Hyder Ali's son, Tipu Sultan, controlled the fort. Nargund Fort played a vital part during the revolt against the British in the Indian Rebellion of 1857. Bhaskar Rao Bhave, also known as Baba Saheb of Nargund, raised a mutiny against British rule in 1858. He was successful in capturing the Koppaldurg fort and killing the commander of the British force, but was defeated because of betrayal and the fort was captured by the British.

== Demographics ==
As of 2001 India census, Nargund had a population of 32,548. Males constitute 51% of the population and females 49%. Nargund has an average literacy rate of 56%, lower than the national average of 59.5%: male literacy is 67%, and female literacy is 45%. In Nargund, 14% of the population is under 6 years of age.

== Nargund Town Municipal Council ==
Nargund is a Town Municipal Council place in the district of Gadag, Karnataka. The town is divided into 23 wards for which elections are held every 5 years.
