= List of Kodavas =

Kodava People
Regions with significant populations
- India

Languages
- Kodava language

The following is a list of prominent Kodavas (also known as the Coorg or Coorgi community).

== Gallery ==
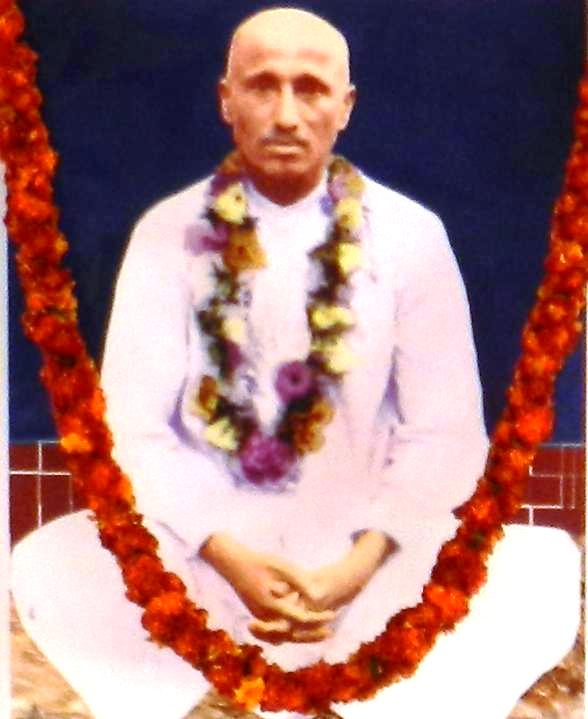
Sadguru Appaiah Swami

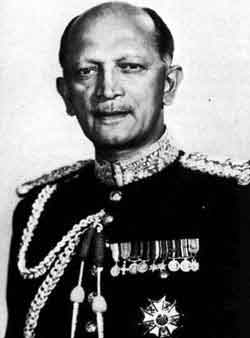
Field Marshal K M Cariappa

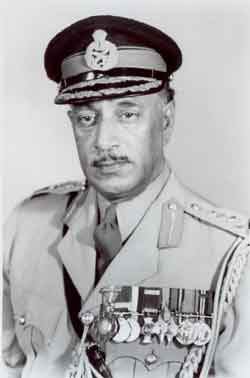
General K S Thimayya

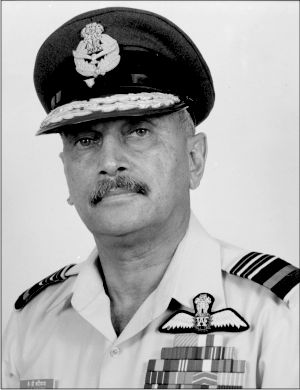
Air Marshal K. C. Cariappa

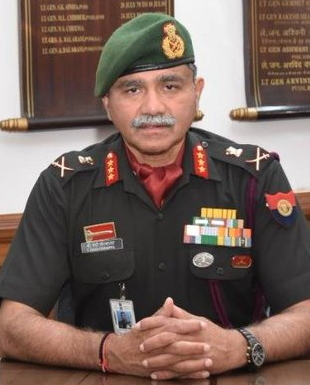
Lieutenant General Bansi Ponnappa

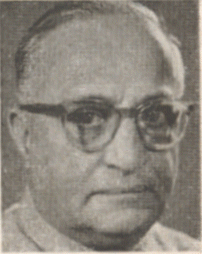
C M Poonacha

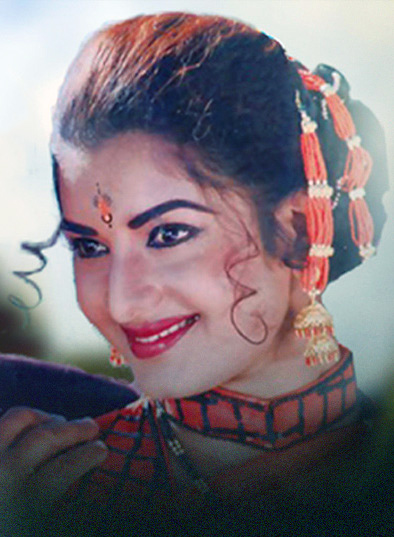
Prema (Kannada actress)

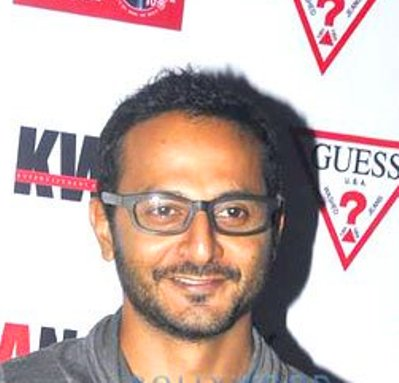
Nikhil Chinapa

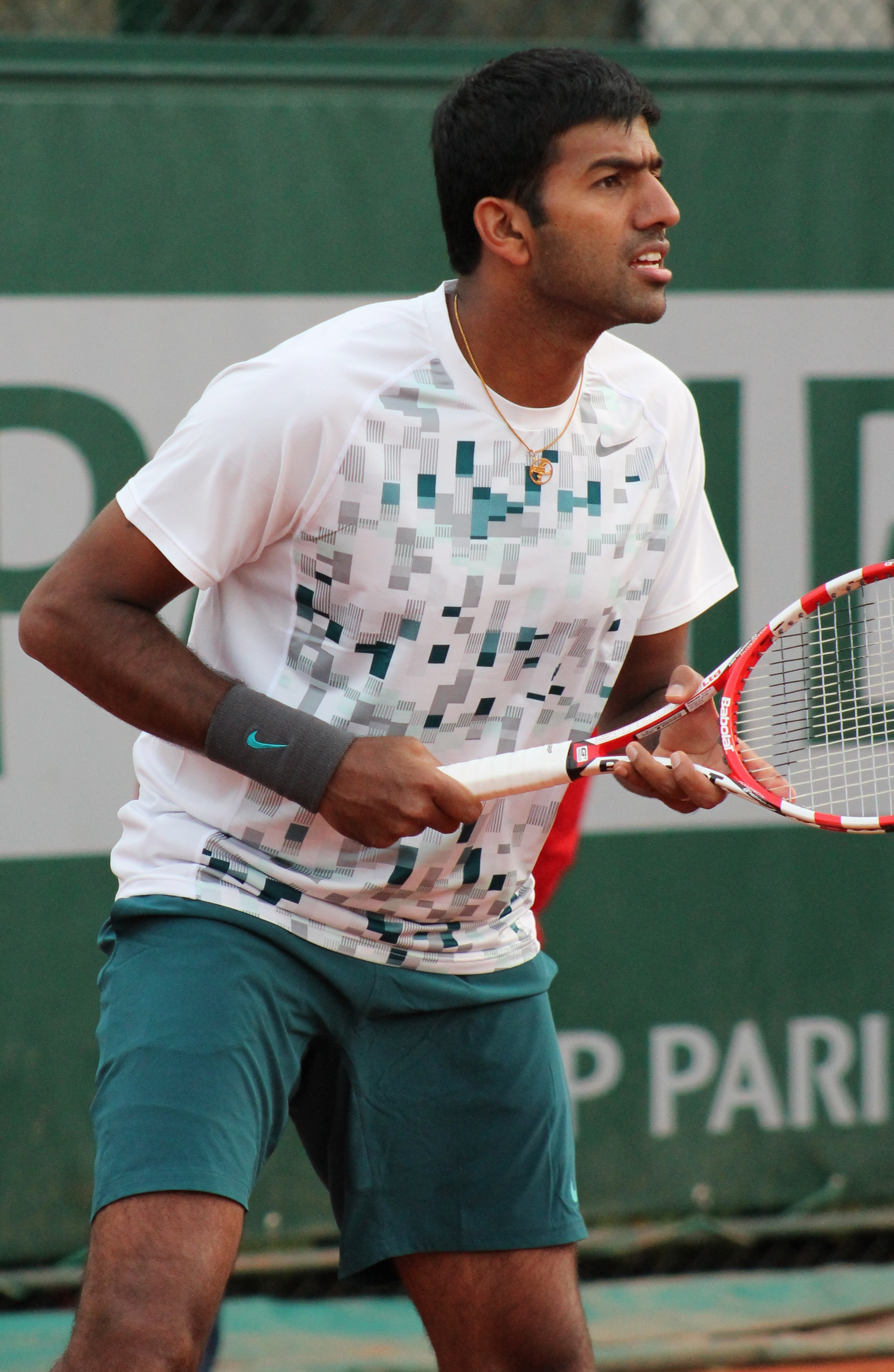
Rohan Bopanna

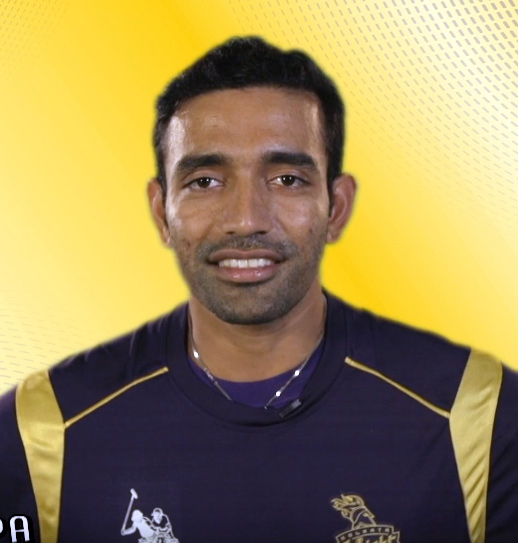
Robin Uthappa

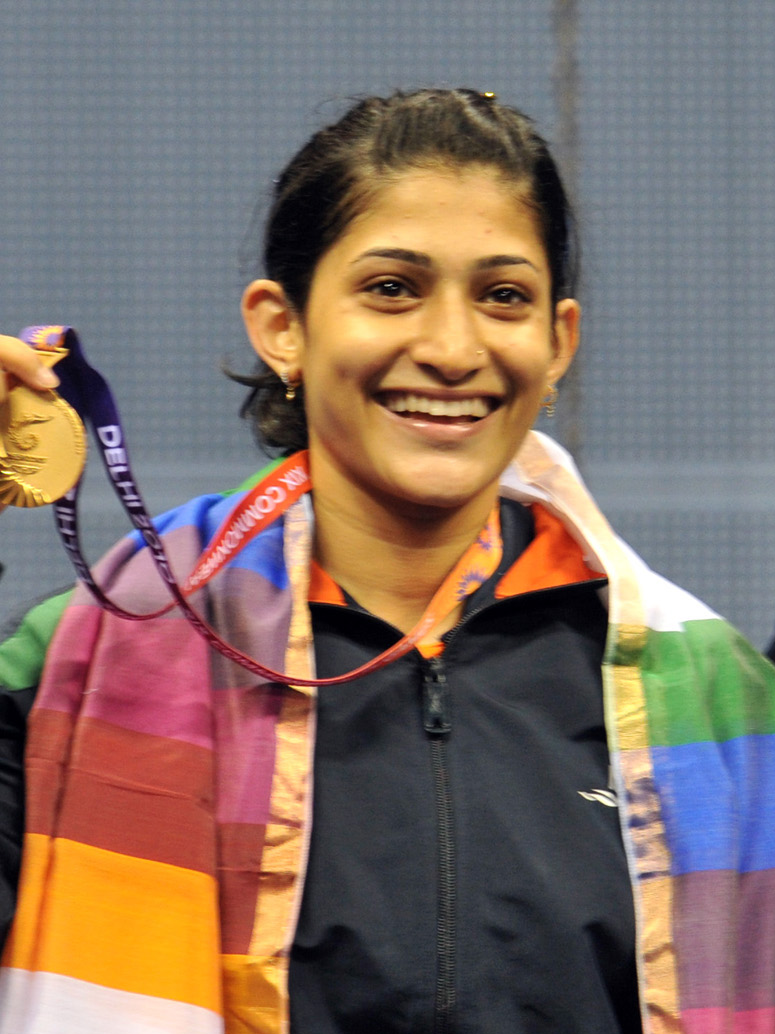
Ashwini Ponnappa

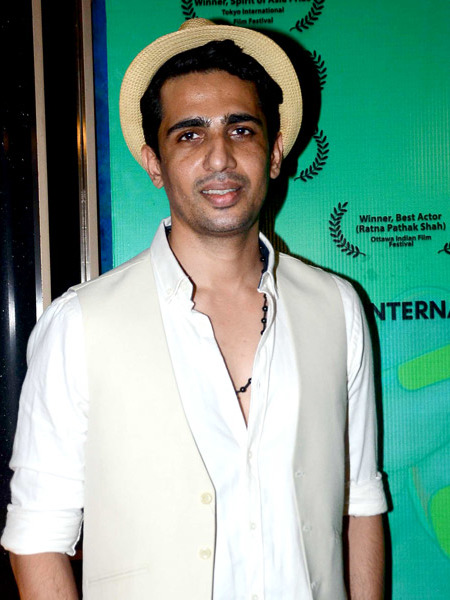
Gulshan Devaiah

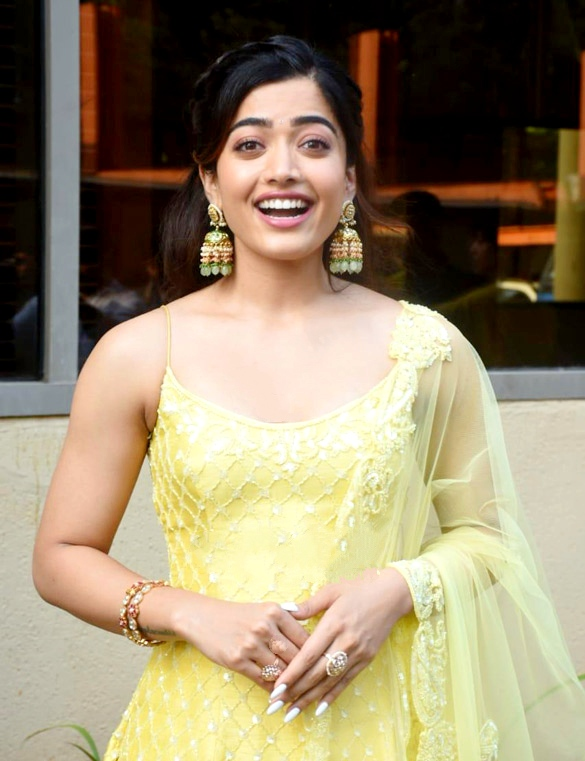
Rashmika Mandanna

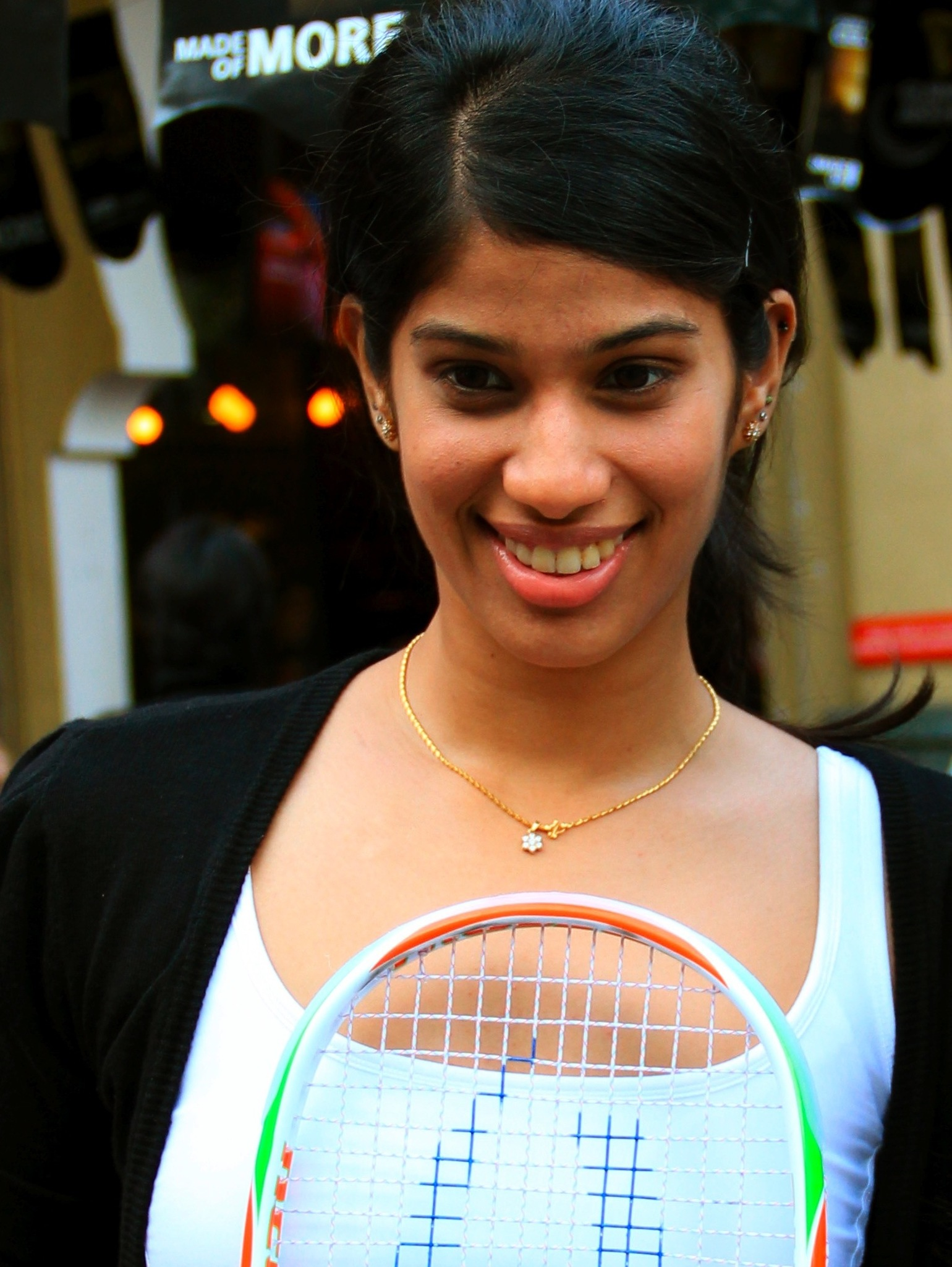
Joshna Chinappa

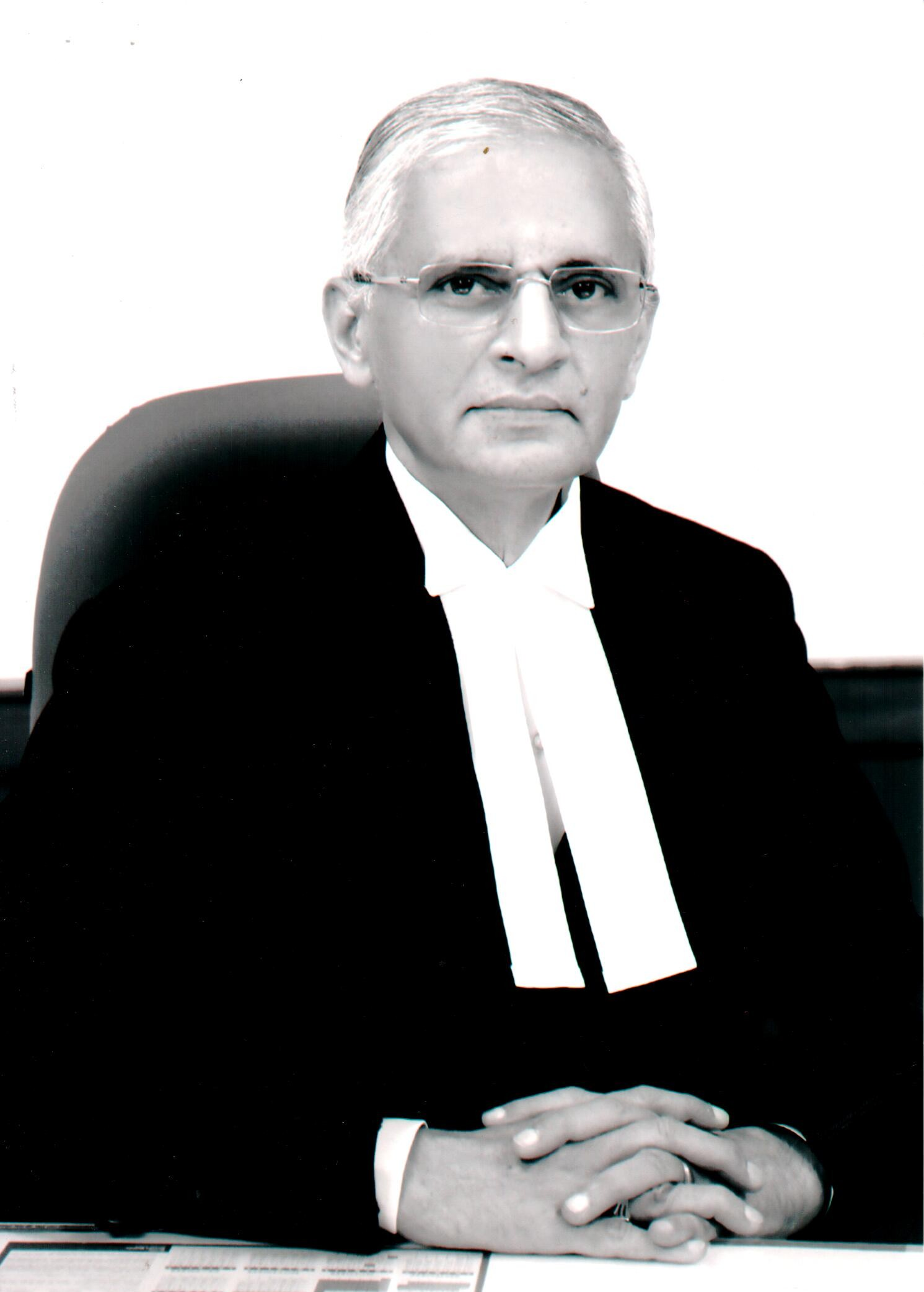
A. S. Bopanna

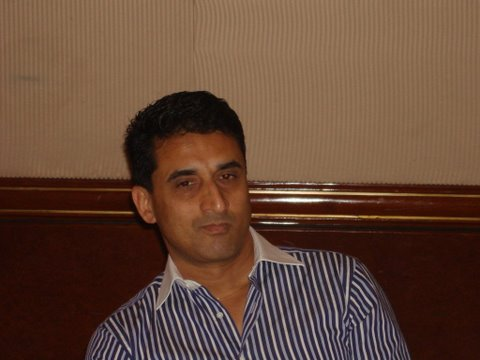
N. S. Narendra

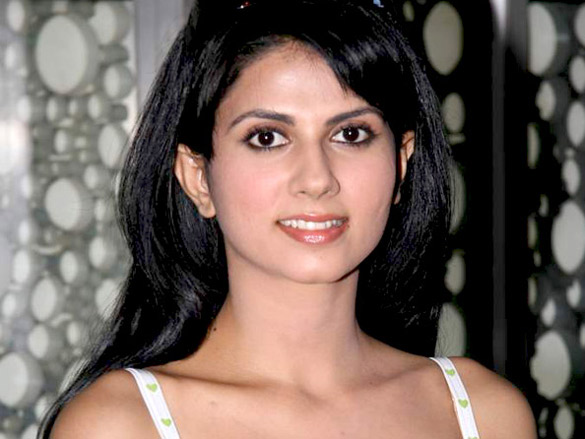
Daisy Bopanna

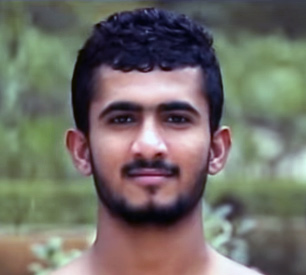
K. C. Cariappa (cricketer)

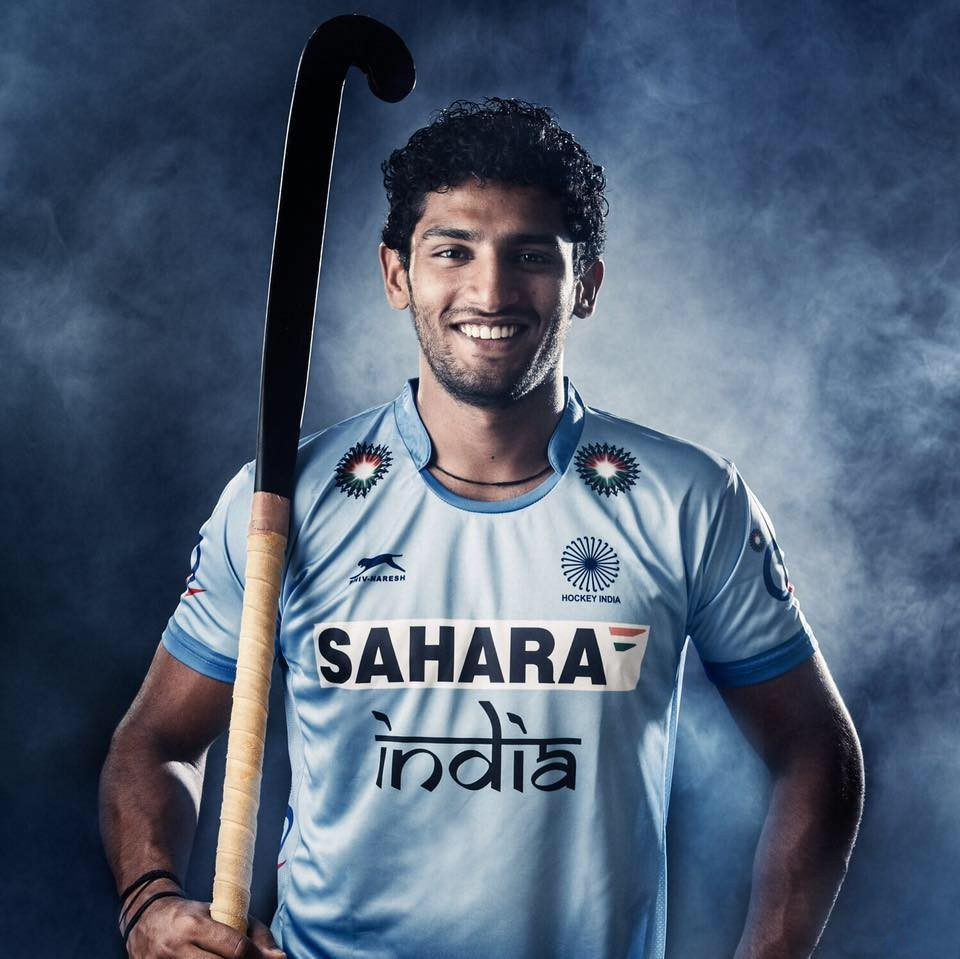
S. K. Uthappa

== Religion ==
- Chandra Varma, legendary ancestor of the Kodavas according to Kaveri Purana in the local Skanda Purana.
- Kalyatanda Ponnappa (c.1600), religious leader and warrior who is now worshipped as a demi-god.
- Sadguru Appayya Swami (1885–1956), (born of Kodava parents) founder of Kaveri Ashram, a Hindu monastery in Virajpet, born as Palanganda Appaiah, ordained into Sannyas (monkhood) by Guru Ramgiri.
- Swami Narayanananda
- Swami Shambhavananda

== Freedom Fighters ==
- Kannanda Doddayya, who defeated Hyder Ali thrice.
- Mathanda Appachu, defeated the British in battle in 1834.
- Pandyanda Belliappa (also called Pandianda Belliappa or P I Belliappa) Gandhian, freedom fighter, politician, journalist.
- C M Poonacha (Cheppudira Muthanna Poonacha) Gandhian, freedom fighter, politician.

== Armed forces ==
- Field Marshal K M Cariappa (Kodandera family), OBE, first Indian Commissioned Officer, later became first Indian General and then first Commander-in-Chief of India. High Commissioner (Ambassador in the Commonwealth) of India in Australia and New Zealand, Field Marshal in 1986. Residency Road and a park in Bangalore has been renamed after him.
- General K. S. Thimayya (Kodandera), DSO, secured Ladakh for India during the Kashmir War of 1948, General and Chief of the Indian Army, after retirement he led the UN peacekeeping forces during when he won International acclaim, Chairman of the Repatriation Committee after Korean War, died in Cyprus, his statue was set up in Singapore Wax Museum, the Cyprus Govt. issued stamps in his honour. Richmond Road in Bangalore has been renamed after him.
- Lieutenant General A C Iyappa, first chief of Bharat Electronics Limited.
- Lieutenant General Biddanda Chengappa Nanda, GOC-in-C Northern Command, Karnataka Rajyothsava Awardee.
- Lieutenant General BK Bopanna, former director general of National cadet corps.
- Air Marshal Kodendera Cariappa Cariappa, Son of Field Marshal K. M. Cariappa and served as the Air Officer Commanding-in-Chief (AOC-in-C) South Western Air Command.
- Squadron Leader A B Devaiah (Ajjamada), who shot down an enemy aircraft before presumably dying in Pakistan during the 1965 war. He is the only Air Force officer to be awarded the Maha Vir Chakra posthumously.
- Mangerira Chinnappa Muthanna Army Martyr.
- Squadron Leader Mandepanda Appachu Ganapathy, Vir Chakra awardee, IAF fighter pilot who shot down a PAF sabre during the Battle of Boyra, Indo-Pakistan War of 1971.
- Lieutenant General Channira Bansi Ponnappa, former Adjutant General in Indian Army.
- Lieutenant General Pattacheruvanda C. Thimayya, GOC-in-C Army Training Command.

== Sports ==
- Ashwini Ponnappa - Indian badminton player
- Jagat and Anita Nanjappa - motor racers
- Joshna Chinappa - Indian squash player
- Rohan Bopanna - Indian tennis player
- Reeth Abraham Indian athlete, Asian Games champion, Arjuna Award, Rajyotsava Award
- K. C. Cariappa, professional cricketer
- Robin Uthappa, Indian Cricketer
- Ashwini Nachappa, Arjuna Awardee, India's sprint queen
- Poovamma Machettira, Indian athlete
- Vidwath Kaverappa, Indian Cricketer
- Neravanda Aiyappa - Cricketer
- K. P. Appanna - Cricketer
- Kelettira Harshitha Bopaiah - Indian basketball player

=== Hockey ===
Kodavas have a long history of association with the game of field hockey. The district of Kodagu is considered as the cradle of Indian hockey.

- A B Subbaiah, Indian field hockey goalkeeper and coach.
- Len Aiyappa, Indian field hockey player.
- M. M. Somaya, Indian field hockey player.
- M. P. Ganesh, Indian field hockey captain and coach.
- Cheppudira Poonacha, Olympian
- S. K. Uthappa, Indian field hockey player.

== Law, Law Enforcement and Civil Services ==
- B. B. Ashok Kumar, police officer
- C B Muthamma (Chonira), first woman Indian Foreign Service officer
- C. G. Somiah, first IAS Officer from Coorg to rise to be the Home Secretary, Chief Vigilance Commissioner (CVC) and Comptroller and Auditor General.
- Diwan Bahadur Ketoli Chengappa, administrator (Chief Commissioner of Coorg province)
- Rao Bahadur IGP P.K.Monnappa (Pemmanda), IPS Officer, DGP of Madras, helped suppress the Nizam's rebellion in Hyderabad in 1950 as part of the Police Action led by Sardar Patel, IGP of Hyderabad then of Mysore, also first police chief of Karnataka and Andhra Pradesh.
- A. S. Bopanna (Ajjikuttira Somaiah Bopanna) is a Judge of Supreme Court of India. He is former Chief Justice of Gauhati High Court. He is also former Judge of Karnataka High Court. He was born in Madikeri, Kodagu on 20 May 1959.

== Actors ==
- Prema (Kannada actress)
- Rashmika Mandanna
- Reeshma Nanaiah
- Gulshan Devaiah
- Harshika Poonacha
- Ashwini Nachappa
- Daisy Bopanna
- A. T Raghu
- Nishan Nanaiah
- Varsha Bollamma
- Shwetha Chengappa, actress
- Nidhi Subbaiah, actress

== Literature ==
- Nadikerianda Chinnappa, folklore compiler
- Appachcha Kavi (also called Appachu Kavi), playwright
- B D Ganapathy
- I. M. Muthanna, author and translator
- Boverianda Nanjamma and Chinnappa, translators, authors
- Nitin Kushalappa
- Anjana Appachana (born into Somayanda Kodava family)

== Entrepreneurs ==
- N S Narendra, Firepro founder

== Politics ==
- M. C. Nanaiah, former Karnataka Minister of law and Forests, leader of opposition in the Karnataka Legislative Council, five-time MLC, MLA
- A. K. Subbaiah, lawyer, former leader of opposition in the Karnataka Legislative Council, four-time MLC
- Prema Cariappa, Mayor of Bangalore, Rajya Sabha MP
- Appachu Ranjan, former sports minister, Government of Karnataka
- A. S. Ponnanna, lawyer, Virajpet MLA

== Music ==
- Biddu Appaiah is a Kodava (Coorgi) by birth. He is a British Indian musician and winner of Grammy award. He was pivotal in the career success of sister-brother duo, Nazia and Zoheb Hassan

== Entertainment ==
- Nikhil Chinapa Disc Jockey who popularised Electronic Dance Music (EDM) in India and is associated with Roadies, Splitsville, MTV and Sunburn Festival.

== Science ==
- K. T. Achaya (Konganda Thammu Achayya) is an Indian chemist born in Kollegal into the Kodava Konganda family.
- Jagadeesh Moodera, Indian-origin American physicist at MIT
