= Kodava people =

Ethnic group in India

Kodava
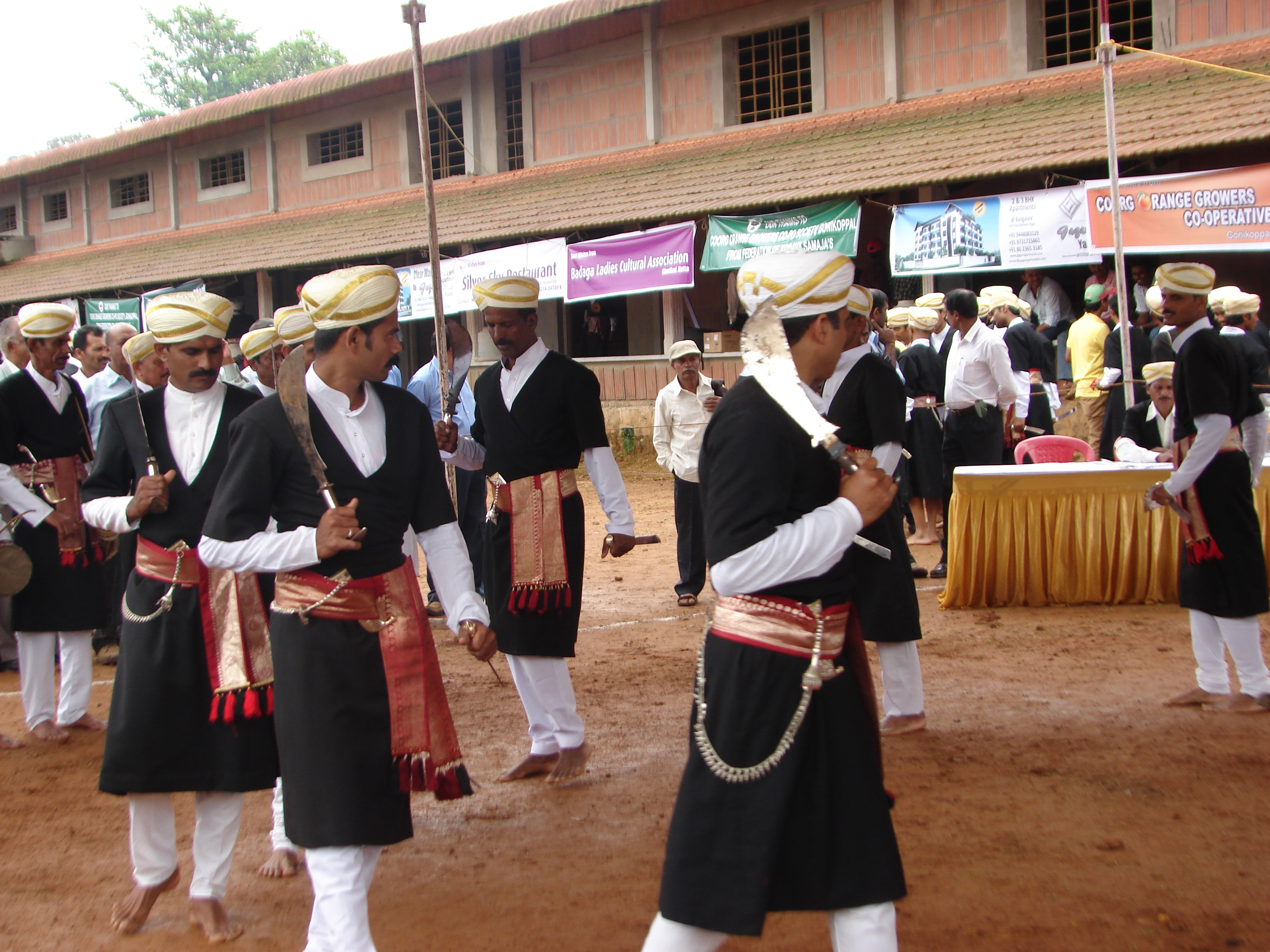
- Kodava men in Kaththi aat (sword dance)

Total population
- (approx) 160,000

Regions with significant populations
- Kodagu, Bangalore, Mysore

Languages
- Koḍava takkï

Religion
- Hinduism

Related ethnic groups
- Kannadiga, Gowda, Amma, Heggade

- Person: Koḍavanï
- People: Koḍavarï
- Language: Koḍava takkï
- Country: Koḍagï

Kodagu: home of the Kodavas shown above in the map of Karnataka, India (in orange)

The Kodavas (Codavas or Kodagas), also called Coorgs, are an endogamous Dravidian ethnolinguistic group from the region of Kodagu in the southern Indian state of Karnataka, who natively speak the Kodava language. Kodavas worship ancestors, nature, and weapons such as swords, bows, arrows, and later guns.

They are traditionally land-owning agriculturists and patrilineal, with martial customs. Originally small landholders, they gained relative prosperity with the advent of coffee cultivation in the nineteenth and twentieth centuries.

The Kodava tribe forms the single largest caste in the district of Kodagu; they are reportedly over 30% of Kodagu's Hindu population, and play a major role in deciding the political candidates and winners there. The Kodava tribe also forms more than 60 percent of the Kodava-speaking population.

Kodavas are the only ethnic group in India permitted to carry firearms without a license.

== Etymology ==
Derived from Kodava √koḍa "western", -vë "person".

== Origin ==
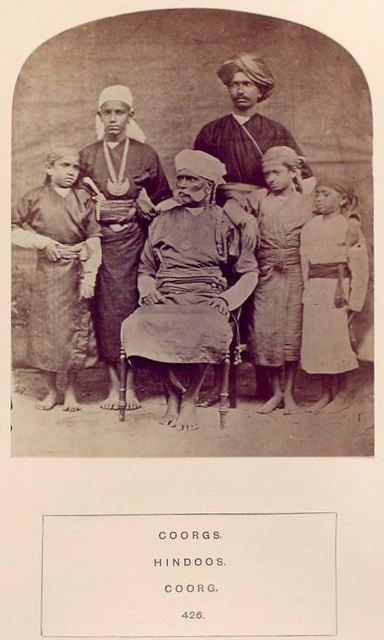
Kodava clansmen at home, 1875, by J. Forbes Watson (from NY public library)

The words Kodava (the indigenous people, language and culture) and Kodagu (the land) come from the same root word 'Koda' which means "Mist" But some claim it means 'hills', others say it means 'west' but both relate to the Western Ghats' location. Kodagu is called Kodava Naad in the native Kodava language. The word "Kodavas" was anglicized to "Coorgs" by the British Raj. For centuries, the Kodavas have lived in Kodagu cultivating paddy fields, maintaining cattle herds and coffee plantations, and carrying arms during war.

Puranic association

The Hindu Puranas (Kaveri Purana of Skanda Purana) claim that Chandra Varma, a lunar dynasty warrior and son of Emperor of Matsya Desha, was the ancestor of the Kodavas. An ardent devotee of Goddess Parvati, he had gone on pilgrimage to several holy places all over India. Chandra Varma had a privy army who escorted him on his campaigns until he came into Kodagu(Coorg). Coorg, the source of the River Kaveri, was uninhabited jungle land when he arrived to settle here. Thereafter he became the first Raja of the Coorg principality. He had 11 sons, the eldest among them was Devakantha who later succeeded him as Raja. They were married to the daughters of the Raja of Vidarbha.

- Kannada inscriptions speak of this region as being called Kudagu nad (parts of Kodagu, Western Mysore and Kerala) as well. Both the name of the natives and of the region are synonymous (Kodava-Kodavu; Kodaga-Kodagu; Coorgs-Coorg).
- In 1398 AD, when the Vijaynagara Empire ruled southern India, Mangaraja, a Kannada poet, wrote in his lexicon about the Kodavas saying that they were a warrior people who were fond of hunting game for sport.

Historians agree that the Kodavas have lived in Kodagu for over thousands of years, hence they are the earliest agriculturists and probably the oldest settled inhabitants of the area.

== History ==
Map of South Indian states prior to the States Reorganisation Act, 1956. Kodagu (then called Coorg) is in dark green.

Historical overview of the Kodava people

=== Ancient period ===
The earliest mention about Coorg can be seen in the works those date back to the Sangam period. The Ezhimala dynasty had jurisdiction over two Nadus – The coastal Poozhinadu and the hilly eastern Karkanadu. According to the works of Sangam literature, Poozhinadu consisted much of the coastal belt between Mangalore and Kozhikode. Karkanadu consisted of Wayanad-Gudalur hilly region with parts of Kodagu.

=== Rajas ===
The Kadamba ruled North Karnataka along with Goa and parts of Maharashtra while the Gangas ruled South Karnataka and parts of Andhra and Tamil Nadu prior to 1000AD. The regions of Hassan, Kodagu, Tulunad and Waynad were ruled between them. Later the cholas entered Karnataka to rule, but it was short lived. The Hoysalas succeeded them and ruled Southern Karnataka (including Tulunad and Kodagu) and parts of Tamil Nadu. In the aftermath of the Delhi Sultanate invasion of South India (around 1319) the Vijaynagara Hindu Empire arose to rule South India until their downfall in the 16th century. From around 1600 until 1834 the Haleri Rajas ruled over Kodagu.

Samadhis were built for army chief Biddanda Bopu, who was the commander-in-chief for the army of Dodda Vira Rajendra, and his son Biddanda Somaiah. On the samadhi of Biddanda Bopu, there is a plate carved in Kannada praising him for his bravery shown in the wars fought against Tipu Sultan.

=== British Raj ===
==== Coorg War ====
In 1834 the last of the Haleri Rajas Chikka Vira Raja fell out of favour with the East India Company who then intervened by launching an invasion Kodagu. A short but bloody campaign occurred in which a number of British soldiers and officers were killed. Near Somwarpet where the Coorgs were led by Mathanda Appachu the resistance was most furious. But this Coorg campaign ended quickly when the Raja sent his Diwan Apparanda Bopu to surrender to the British and lead them from Kushalnagar into Madikeri. After that, Kodagu was annexed by the British, and the Raja was exiled. Apparanda Bopu and Cheppudira Ponnappa were retained as the Dewans of Coorg.

==== Freedom Struggle ====
The Coorg rebellion of 1837 actually occurred in Sulya which was separated from Coorg Province in 1834 and attached to South Canara district of Madras Province. Led by Guddemane Appaiah Gowda, and others it was not supported to Gowdas alone nor opposed by all Kodavas. "A large number of people from Coorg settled in Lower Coorg also participated in the revolt... There are no reliable sources which prove such a bitter hatred among the Coorgs and the Gowdas of Sullia." In fact, Kodavas from Nalkunadu led by Subedar Mandira Uthaiah (Nalknadu Uttu) and Subedar Nerpanda Madaiah, Subedar Kollira Achaiah, Chermandanda Subbaiah Chottemanda Poovaiah and Subedar Cheeyakpoovanda Devaiaha actively participated in the revolt. A British officer, Colonel Green, entered Mangalore by ship from Kannur. A detachment of troops under his command participated in numerous battles against Coorg forces.

The two Coorg Diwans Apparanda Bopu and Cheppudira Ponnappa were great diplomats. Apparanda Bopu was first suspected by the British who first wanted to throw him into jail. But the two stopped Col Green and convinced the British to spare the lives of Kedambadi Rame Gowda, Chetty Kudiya, Mandira Uthaiah, Shantheyanda Mallayya, Subedar Nerpanda Madaiah and Subedar Kollira Achaiah and other rebel leaders. However they were unable to save all the leaders. In this manner all the Lingayats, Gowdas, Kodavas, Bunts and others who survived have to thank the two Coorg Diwans for convincing the British not to execute them.

During the period of British rule, Coorgs entered politics, government service, medicine, education, and law. Under British protection, Kodagu became a State with nominal independence (Coorg State). The British recognised the exceptional martial abilities of the Kodavas and used them in the Indian Army. Many Kodavas fought in the two World Wars. Dewan Bahadur Ketolira Chengappa was the last Chief Commissioner of Coorg in 1947. In 1950 Coorg was recognised as one of 27 different states of the Indian Union but in 1956 the state of Coorg was merged into Mysore (now Karnataka).

There were many freedom fighters among the Kodavas as well, like Iynanda P. Kariappa, who was a leader of the INC and was sent to Delhi Jail by the British, he later on became the first MLA of Coorg State, and was also the District board President. Pandyanda Belliappa (Kodagu's Gandhi), Kollimada C. Carumbaiah, C.M. Poonacha, Chekkera Monnaiah, Mallengada Chengappa, Ajjikuttira Chinnappa, Ponnimada Machaiah, Kalengada Chinnappa, Chokira Madappa, Pandikanda Madappa, Kotera Accavva, Balyatanda Muddavva, Mukkatira Bojamma, Machimanda Medakka, Appanderanda Kalamma and others. It is noteworthy that there was an army of freedom fighters from the Kodava community such as Puliyanda Subbaiah from Maggula village.

== Culture ==
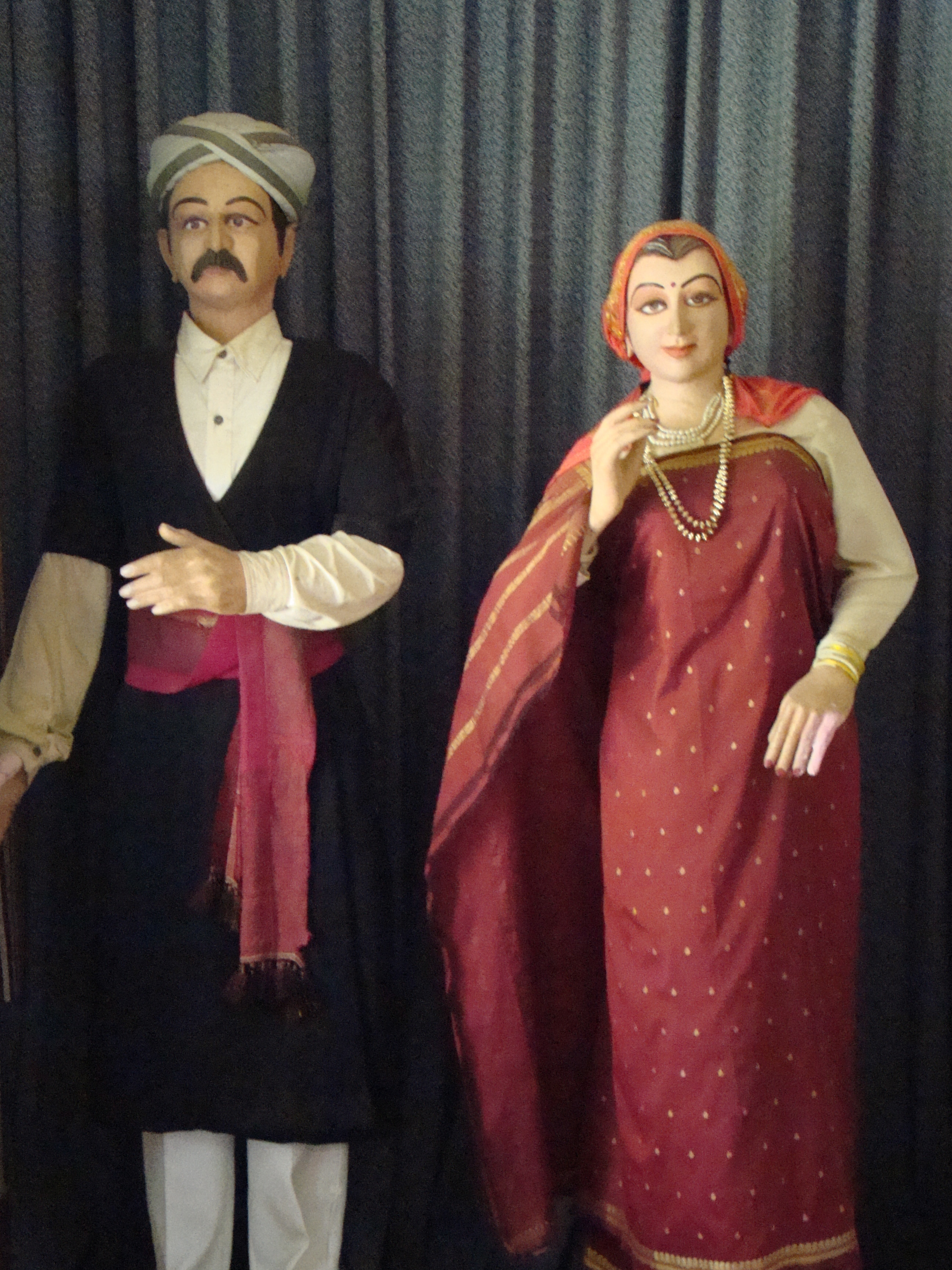
Dolls in Kodava attire

=== Attire ===
A Kodava woman is called Kodavathi Kodavas have distinctive dresses, the men wearing wraparound robes called the Kupya (now only seen at ceremonial occasions), and the women with a distinctive style of wearing the sari. The Kodava woman wears a sari with the pleats at the back and the loose end pinned at the right shoulder. The men have many distinctive practices such as carrying ceremonial knives, and martial war dances.

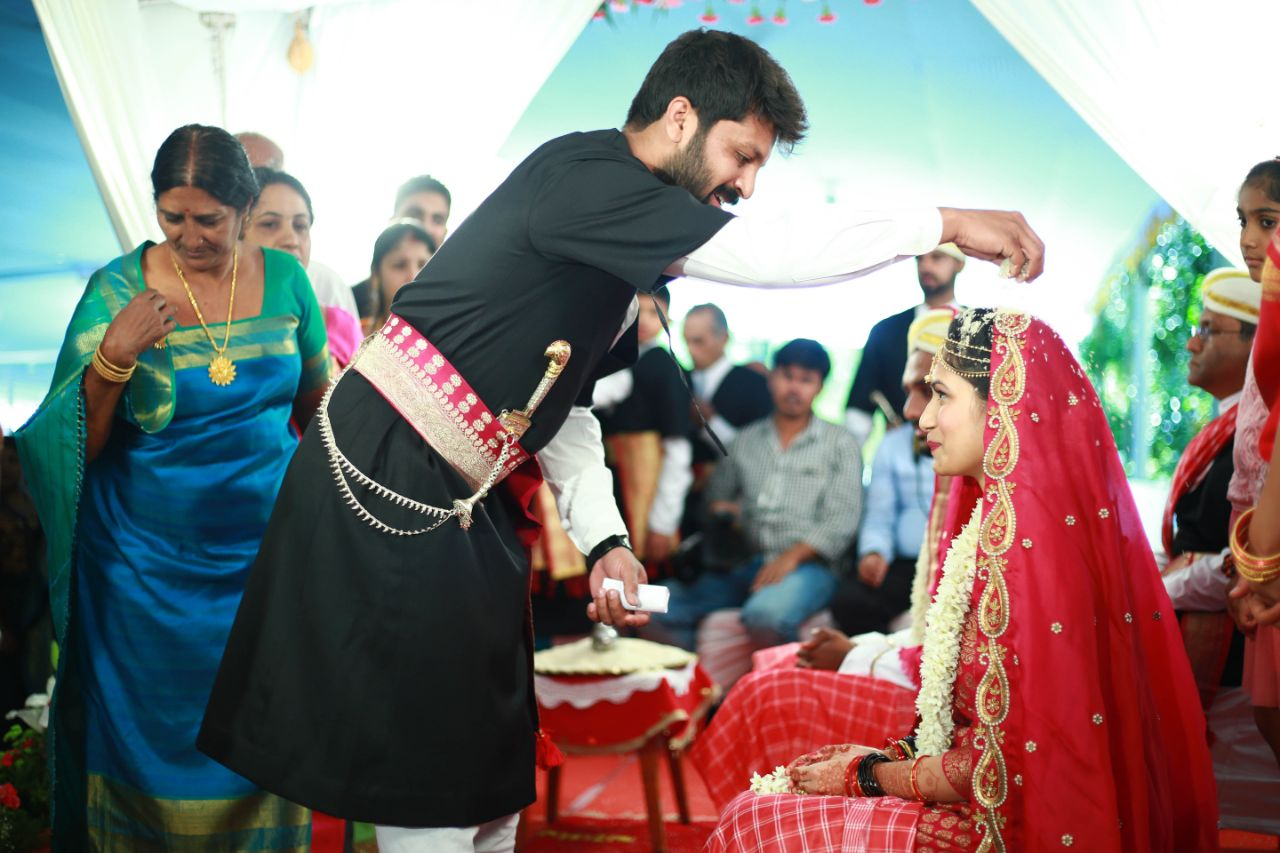
Kodava wedding

Kodava attire

Scene explaining the working mechanism of firearms used by the Kodava people

Kodava attire

Kodava attire

=== Emblem ===
The Kodava/Coorg Emblem was created by Muckatira Ponnappa Mandanna aka Pimmu in the 1960s. What was designed as a logo for the then "Coorg Rifle Club" became synonymous with Kodagu/Coorg itself, with the symbol being used everywhere from cars and name boards to websites and tattoos. Souvenirs of various materials such as metal, plastic and wood are commonly available all over Coorg and in cities such as Mysore and Bangalore. The Kodavas are a martial race and the objects in the emblem are the "Odi Kathi" or machette, the "Peeche Kathi" or dagger and a shot gun.

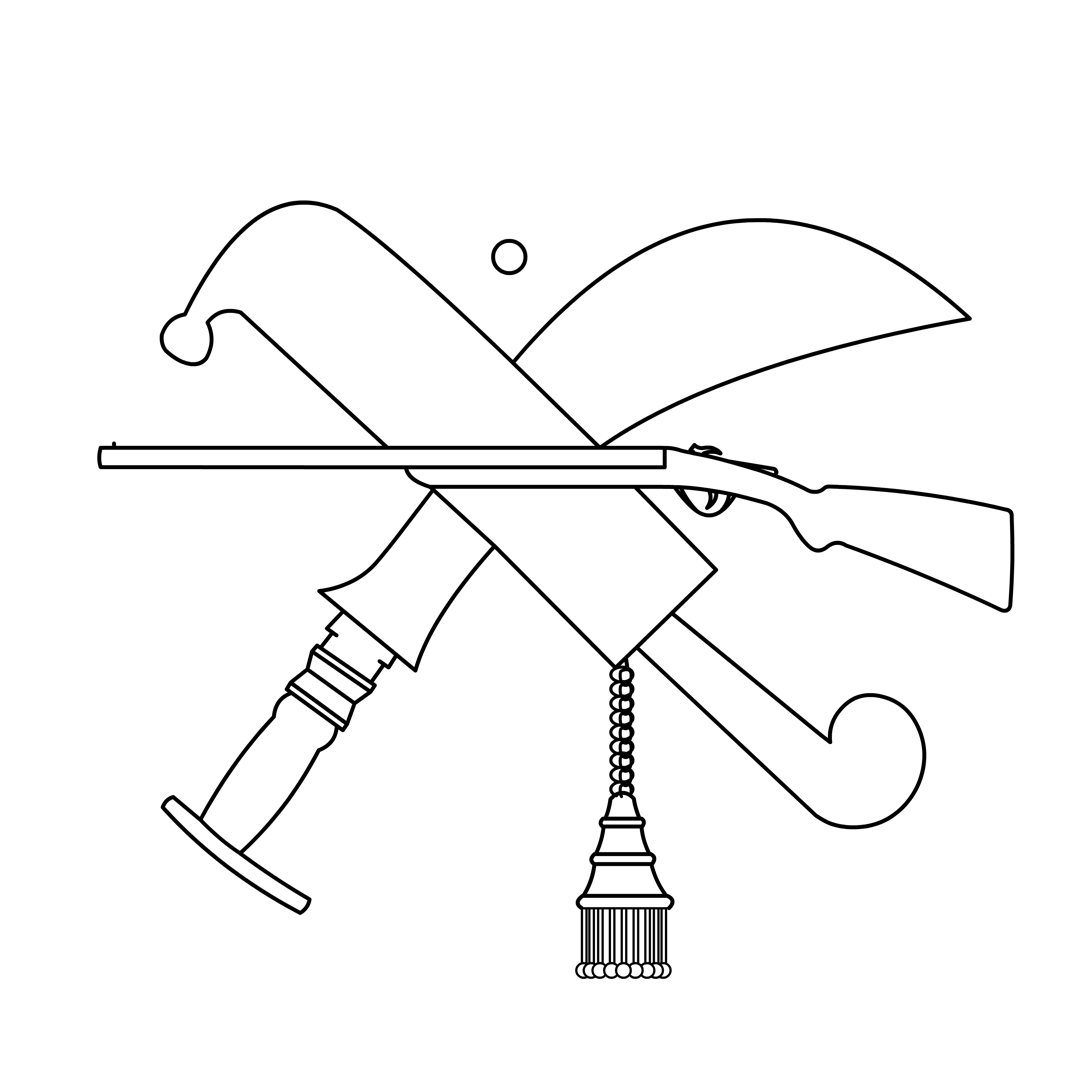

Mr Bopanada Poonacha explains the origin, design, and government certification of the Kodava logo

=== Cuisine ===
- Boiled rice (koolu) is a staple food of the Kodavas for lunch and dinner.
- Coconut,
- Jackfruit Chekke
- Plantain,
- Mango and
- Other fruits and vegetables

are widely used. Ghee is used in well-to-do families and on festive occasions. Rice in the form of:

- Kanji or
- Koolu

is served at meals along with curries and other additional dishes. Meat and alcoholic drinks are not prohibited:

- Pork,
- Chicken,
- River Fish and
- Varieties of bush meat (wild game meat)

are commonly consumed. The famous 'Pandhi Curry' is a Kodava pork (mainly hunted wild boar) curry dish common in most households (which is deep brown due to the use of Garcinia cambogia vinegar called Kachumpuli). It is served along with 'Kadumbuttu' (steamed rice balls). Sweet dishes like Akki Payasa are prepared during festive occasions. Other special dishes include:

- Otti (rice flatbread),
- Paaputtu,
- Thaliya Puttu (similar to Idli),
- Noolputtu (rice noodles) served with traditional Coorg chicken curry dominated by coconut and other masalas,
- Bymbale (bamboo shoots),
- wild mushrooms,
- various leafy vegetables,
- ferns,
- crabs,
- thambuttu (a sweet specially prepared during the harvest festival called Puthari),
- raw mango curry,
- butter fruit or avocado,
- tender jackfruit curry,
- jackfruit seeds curry,
- traditional sauce, etc.

Kodava Cuisine Explained

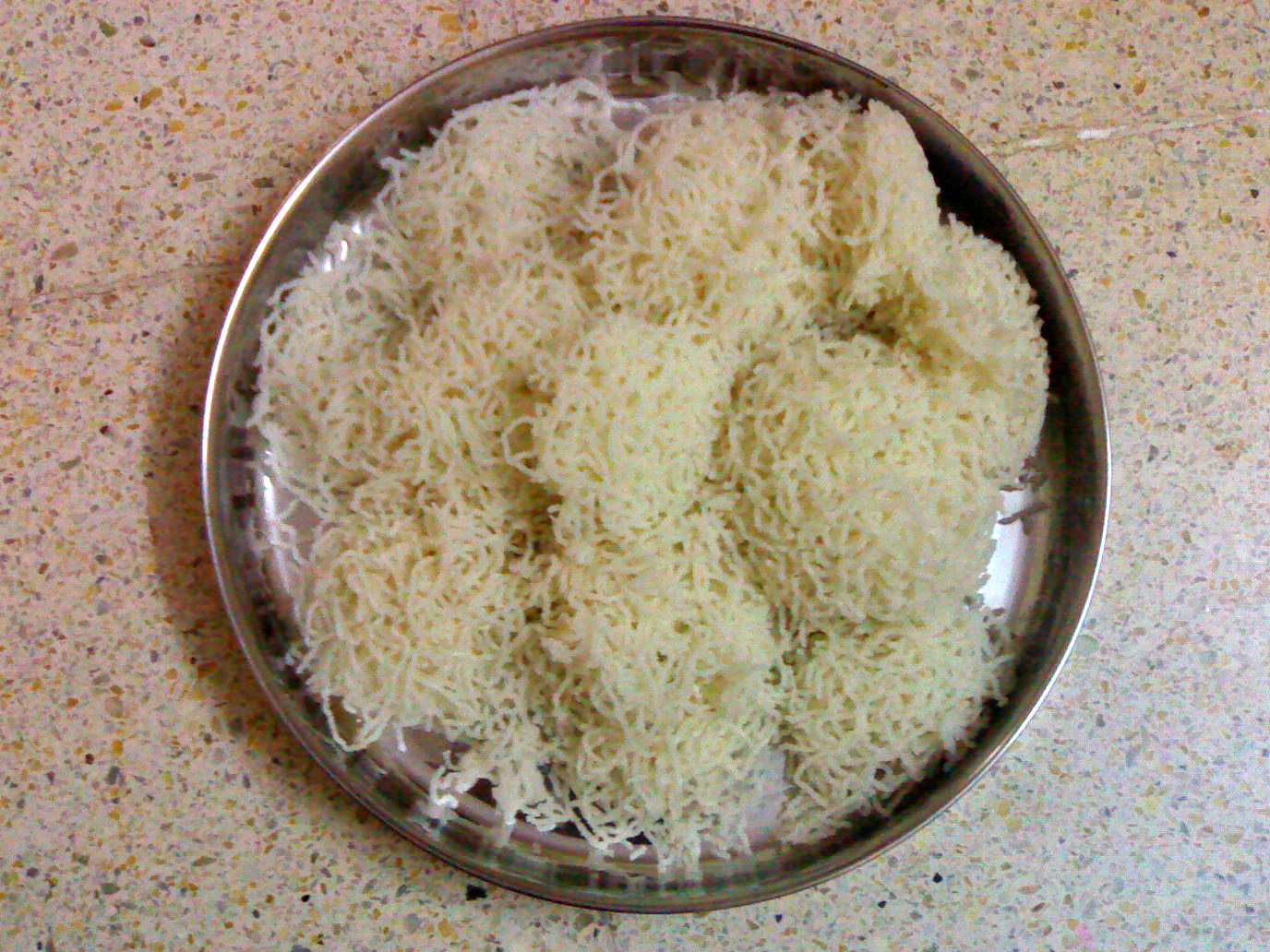
Noolputtu

== Society ==
=== Organizational structure ===
Kodava settlements in Coorg are in the form of Okka family groups that are scattered across agricultural and forested holdings, where traditional Ainmane houses form focal meeting points in the rural landscape. The emergence of townships, as such, has been a relatively recent phenomenon and many of the main towns in Kodagu are inhabited by recent migrants and non-Kodavas.

=== Social Status ===
The Kodavas enjoyed equal status with the Nairs, Bunts, Vokkaligas, and Vellalas in the Hindu caste system.

== Festivals ==
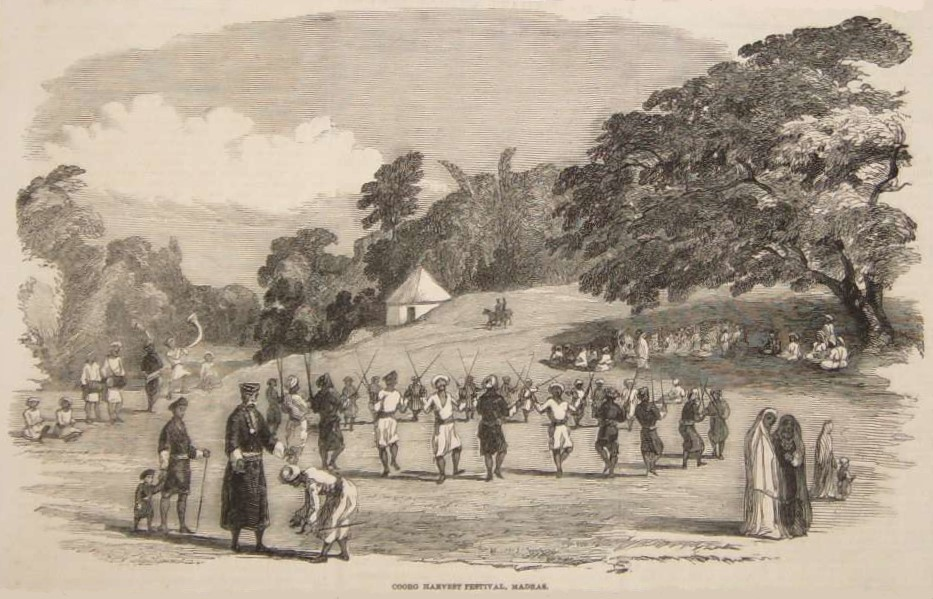
Kodava harvest festival, Puththari. Illustrated London News, 1852

Kodava Festivals

Kodava festivities center around their agriculture and military tradition. Originally most of their lives were spent in the field: cultivating, harvesting and guarding their fields from the depredations of wild animals, or otherwise they were either waging war or hunting for game.

Their new year was originally celebrated on Bishu Changrandi (called Vishu in Kerala).

The Kodavas began to celebrate a few Hindu festivals such as Ugadi, Ayudha Puja (Dasara, also called Navaratri, Vijaydashami, Durga Puja or Dussehra) and Mahashivaratri under the Haleri Rajas(1602–1834).

However Kodavas traditionally celebrate the following three main festivals peculiar to Kodagu alone (two are cultural and one religious) – Kail Poldh, Kaveri Changrandi (Tula Sankramana) and Puthari.

Few more small festivals celebrated within the family groups are Karana Kodupo ( offerings to the 'Guru Karana' the main ancestor of the family & feasting), Pasanamurthy Therre Kattuva(offerings to god pasanamurthy), etc. during their specific times.

The Naad namme (village festival) varying from village to village this festival runs for a week of time in some places and a minimum of three days in some villages, some parts call this festival as Boad Namme where each day will have its own type celebrations like a group of men and children dressing up in different attires like tiger, women, various themes and bands and do a procession overnight to all the houses in the village entertaining the villagers (some places people offer money to these groups) and later next day they all go to a holy lake near the Oor Devastana (village temple) usually located in Deva kaad (god's forest) take bath, change their attire & take blessings of God in temple. These days are followed by poojas and food offerings in temple (veg food). In some places, non veg food is also served outside the temple to villagers at the end of the festival. This is celebrated every year in all the parts of Kodagu, some places celebrate once in two years.

=== Kail Poldh (Festival of Arms) ===
Kail Poldh is celebrated on 3 September. Officially, the festival begins on the 18th day after the sun enters the Simha Raasi (the Western sign of Leo). Kail means weapon or armoury and Poldh means festival. The day signifies the completion of "naati" – meaning the transplantation of the rice (paddy) crop. The festival signifies the day when men should prepare to guard their crop from wild boars and other animals, since during the preceding months, in which the family were engaged in the fields, all weapons were normally deposited in the "Kanni Kombare", or the prayer room.

Hence on the day of Kailpoldu, the weapons are taken out of the Pooja room, cleaned and decorated with flowers. They are then kept in the "Nellakki Nadubade", the central hall of the house and the place of community worship. Each member of the family has a bath, after which they worship the weapons. Feasting and drinking follow. The eldest member of the family hands a gun to the senior member of the family, signifying the commencement of the festivities. The Menu for the day is Kadumbutte (steamed rice balls) and Pandhi Curry (Pork Curry) and Alcoholic beverages are also served.

The whole family assembles in the "Mand" (open ground), where physical contests and sports, including marksmanship, are conducted. In the past the hunting and cooking of wild game was part of the celebration, but today shooting skills are tested by firing at a coconut tied onto the branch of a tall tree. Traditional rural sports, like grabbing a coconut from the hands of a group of 8–10 people (thenge porata), throwing a stone the size of a cricket ball at a coconut from a distance of 10–15 paces (thenge eed), lifting a stone ball of 30–40 cm lying at one's feet and throwing it backwards over the shoulders, etc., are now conducted in community groups called Kodava Samajas in towns and cities.

=== Kaveri Sankramana (worship of river Kaveri) ===
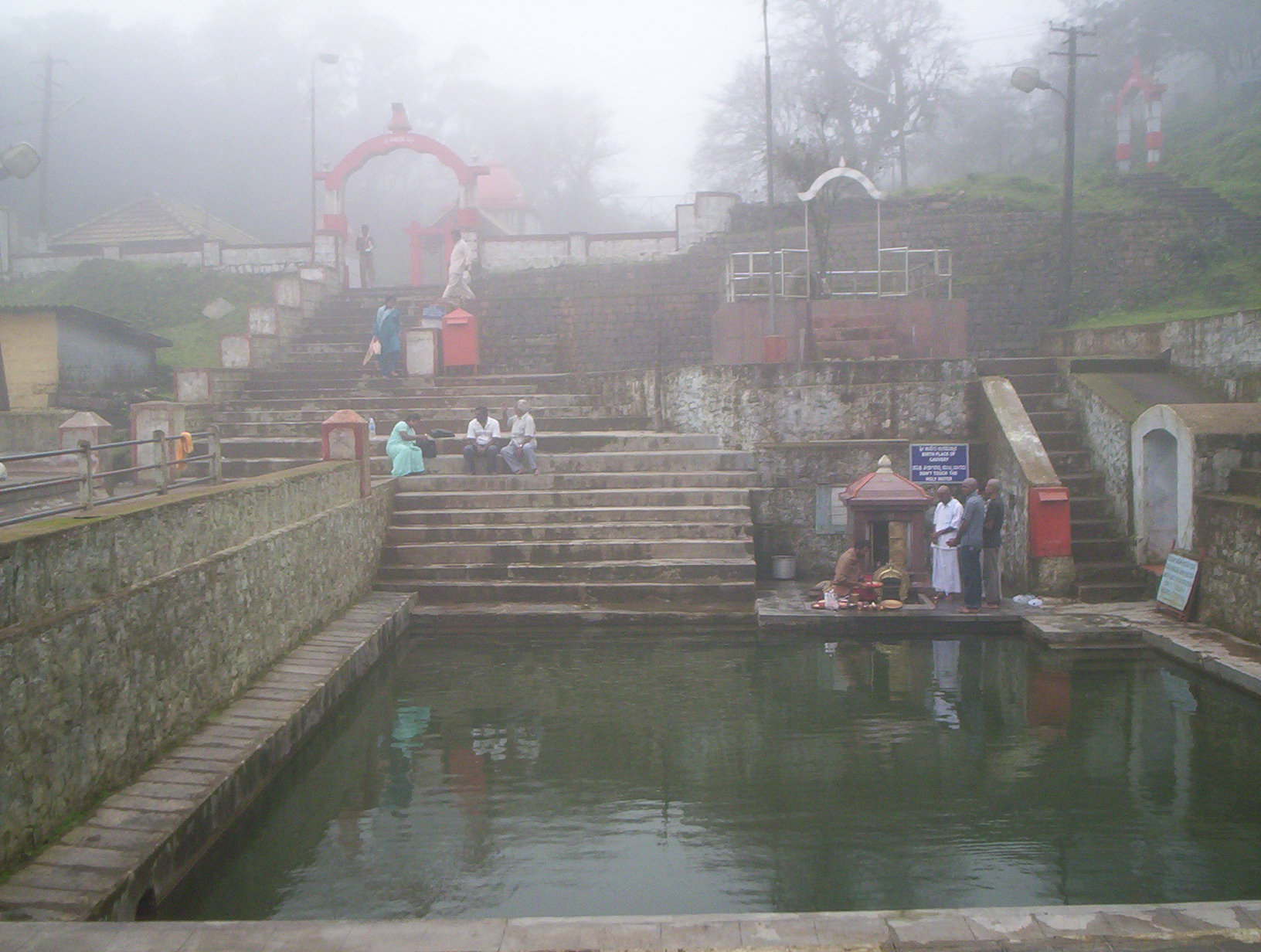
Talakaveri, origin of the river Kaveri

The Kaveri Sankramana festival normally takes place in mid-October. It is associated with the river Kaveri, which flows through the district from its source at Talakaveri. At a predetermined time, when the sun enters Tula Rasi (Tula sankramana), a fountain from a small tank fills the larger holy tank at Talakaveri. Thousands of people gather to dip in this holy water. The water is collected in bottles and reaches every home throughout Kodagu. This holy water is called Theertha, and is preserved in all Kodava homes. A spoonful of this water is fed to the dying, in the belief that they will attain moksha (spiritual emancipation) and gain entry to heaven.

On this day, married women wearing new silk saris perform puja to a vegetable, symbolising the goddess Kaveri. The vegetable is usually a cucumber or a coconut, wrapped in a piece of red silk cloth and decorated with flowers and jewels (mainly 'Pathak' (Kodava Mangalasuthra)). This is called the Kanni Puje. The word Kanni denotes the goddess Parvati, who incarnated as Kaveri. Three sets of betel leaves and areca nut are kept in front of the goddess with bunches of glass bangles. All the members of the family pray to the goddess by throwing rice and prostrating themselves before the image.

The elder members of the family ceremonially bless the younger. An older married woman then draws water from the well and starts cooking. The menu of the day is dosa and vegetable curry (usually sweet pumpkin curry (kumbala kari) ) and payasa. Nothing but vegetarian food is cooked on this day, and this is the only festival which is strictly vegetarian. Alcohol is prohibited. The Kaveri cult has its center and origin in Kodagu. It is only those Kodava rites associated with the river Kaveri that are Brahmanical in influence.

=== Puttari (Harvest festival) ===
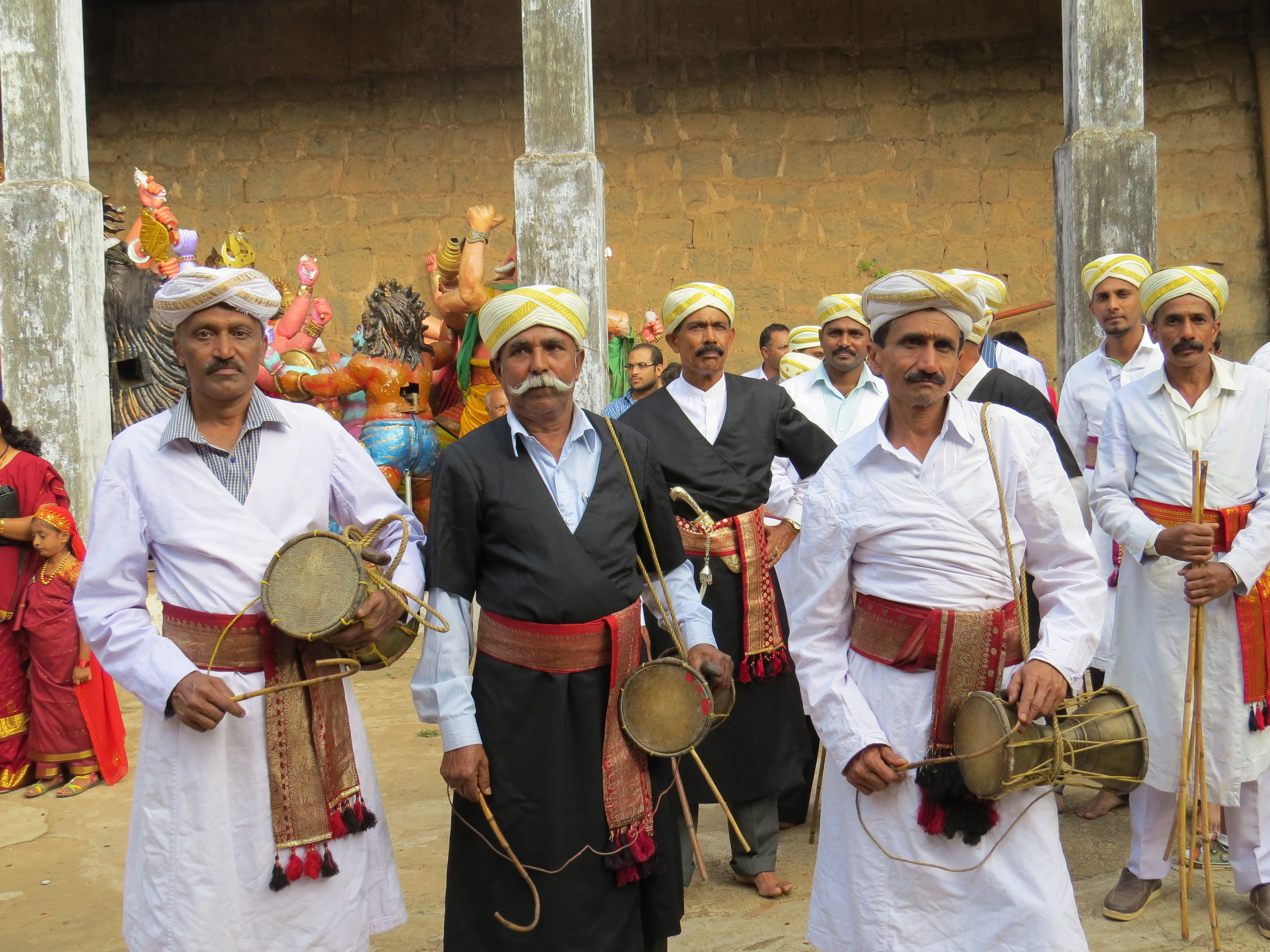
Kodava folk singers

Puttari (pudiya ari) means "new rice" and is the rice harvest festival. This takes place in late November or early December and is always on the night of a full moon. Celebrations and preparations for this festival start a week in advance by all family members cleaning up the entire house and surroundings, painting the house (whitewash in olden days).

On the day of Puttari, the whole family assembles and all the ancestral homes (ain mane) and houses are decorated with marigold flowers and green mango leaves. Specific foods are prepared: thambuttu (a sweet made with ripe bananas and roasted rice flour), kadambutt pandhi curi and also a special food of yam and jaggery water with coconut which is eaten before going to the field. All food prepared is first offered to the ancestors (meedi) before the family eats.

Then the eldest member of the family hands a sickle to the head of the family and one of the women leads a procession to the paddy fields with a lit lamp in her hands. A gun is fired to mark the beginning of the harvest, with chanting of "Poli Poli Deva" (may the Gods grant bountious harvests) by all present. Then the symbolic harvesting of the crop begins. The paddy is cut and stacked and tied in sheaves that are then carried home to be offered to the gods. The sheaves are attached over the front door and the main lamp in the home to mark the generosity of the gods and attract a good harvest in the following season.

The younger generation then light fire crackers and revel, symbolising prosperity. Groups of youngsters visit neighboring houses to celebrate and are given monetary gifts. A week later, this money is pooled and the entire village celebrates a communal dinner. All family members gather for this meal. Dinner normally consists of meat dishes, such as pork, and mutton curry. Alcoholic beverages are also served at such feasts in Kodagu.

== Religion ==
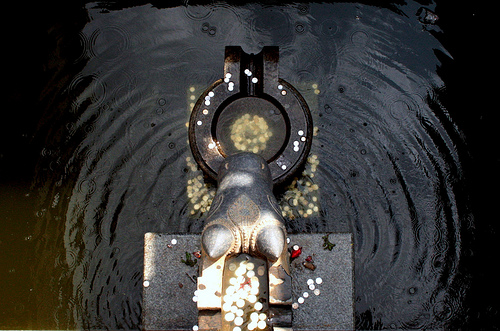

=== Shrines and deities ===
The Kodavas have a local trinity comprising the Kuladevi (patron goddess) Kaveri, Maguru (chief preceptor) Igguthappa and Guru Karana (revered common ancestor). The Kodavas of Kodagu are Hindus, since the deities Kavari and Igguthappa are documented as gods in Hindu scriptures. Kaveri was originally worshiped as a natural element (water, in the form of river).

Igguthappa, the most important local God, the God of snakes, rain, harvest and rice (Incidentally, the famous Kukke Subramani temple located near Kodagu is dedicated to snakes, hence Subramani is the God of snakes despite the misconception that his carrier, the peacock, which eats grains and insects, kills and eats snakes). There are many spirits worshipped in Kodagu. The Kodavas also practised snake worship. Consumption of soma (liquor) and pork is permitted,

They maintained sacred groves on their public village lands from ancient times, hunting and cutting trees was prohibited in these woods called the Devakadu. However these days the government and private speculative land buyers have acquired these sacred groves and converted them into farms for monetary gains with disrespect towards native religious feelings. The Kodavas believe in astrology as well.

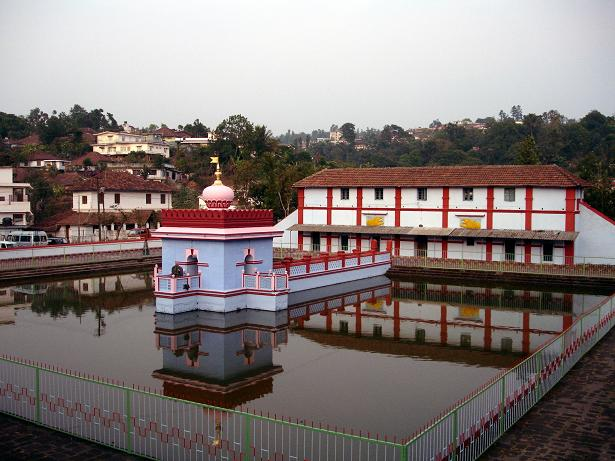
The temple tank of Omkareshwara Temple of Madikeri, the town is in the background

On their ancestral clan lands they have a shrine (Kaimada), which is the shrine of the clan's first ancestor (Guru Karana – Karana). The spirits of departed souls who were prominent figures in the community and had done good deeds while they were alive were worshipped. These spirit gods do not have a set form of physical representation. Symbolically a piece of rock is sanctified and considered as such a spirit deity. A number of weapons, made of wood or metal, are kept in the Kaimadas. Every year, members of each family get together to remember the 'Karana's of their family and give offerings (similar to Ofrenda).

Each village had a Bhagwathi, each lane had a snake deity and each nad(region) had an Aiyappa (Kodava Deity). Some of the main shrines of the Kodavas are the temples of Talakaveri, Bhagamandala, Padi Igguthappa, Peggala (Heggala), Kakot Parambu and Bythoor.

=== Socio-religious link with North Malabar ===
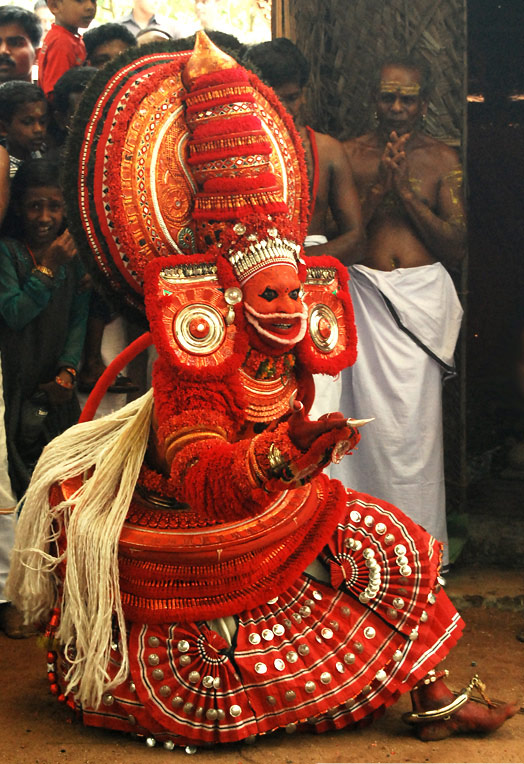
Theray (Theyyam)

The word Kodakar was the Malayalam word for a Kodava, and it comes from the word "Kodag-kara". The ancient Kodavas of Kodagu had land trade with Northern Malabar, especially with Thalassery (Tellicherry) port on the coast, and would also go on regular pilgrimage to the temples of the region. Devotees from Kodagu were, and still are, frequent visitors to the temples of Kannur and Waynad (districts of North Kerala). These temples are in places like Baithur or Bythoor (Vayathur and Ulikkal), Payyavoor, Parassinikkadavu, Thirunelli, Kanjirath, Nileshwar and Payyanur. Also the Nambima (Namboothiri) priests of North Malabar traditionally served as the temple priests in the temples of Kodagu. The folk songs of the Kodavas speak of the temple deities having originated in North Malabar. These folk songs while talking of Kodagu and its people also mention the temple regions as well as the Thiyyar, Nambiya (Nambiar), the Nambima (Namboothiri) and the Nayamma (the Kodava word for Nair – in Malayalam Nayanmmar means Nairs) people of Northern Malabar.

Baithurappa (Bythoorappa) is a chief deity of the Kodavas. The Puggera family of Kodavas were hereditary temple managers at the Bythoor (Vayathur, in Kerala and near Karnataka's Kodagu border) temple which was in the dominion of the kaliat Nambiar who like the Kolathiri was an ally of the Kodavas. Every year Kodavas from Southern Kodagu pilgrimage to this place. Likewise the Bovverianda and the Mundiolanda families of Kodavas were the hereditary temple managers at the Payyavur temple which was under the dominion of mannanar. This is because a few of the Kodavas lived in North Malabar in the Taliparamba (ancient capital of the Cheras) region in the ancient past and fought on their side as mercenary soldiers.

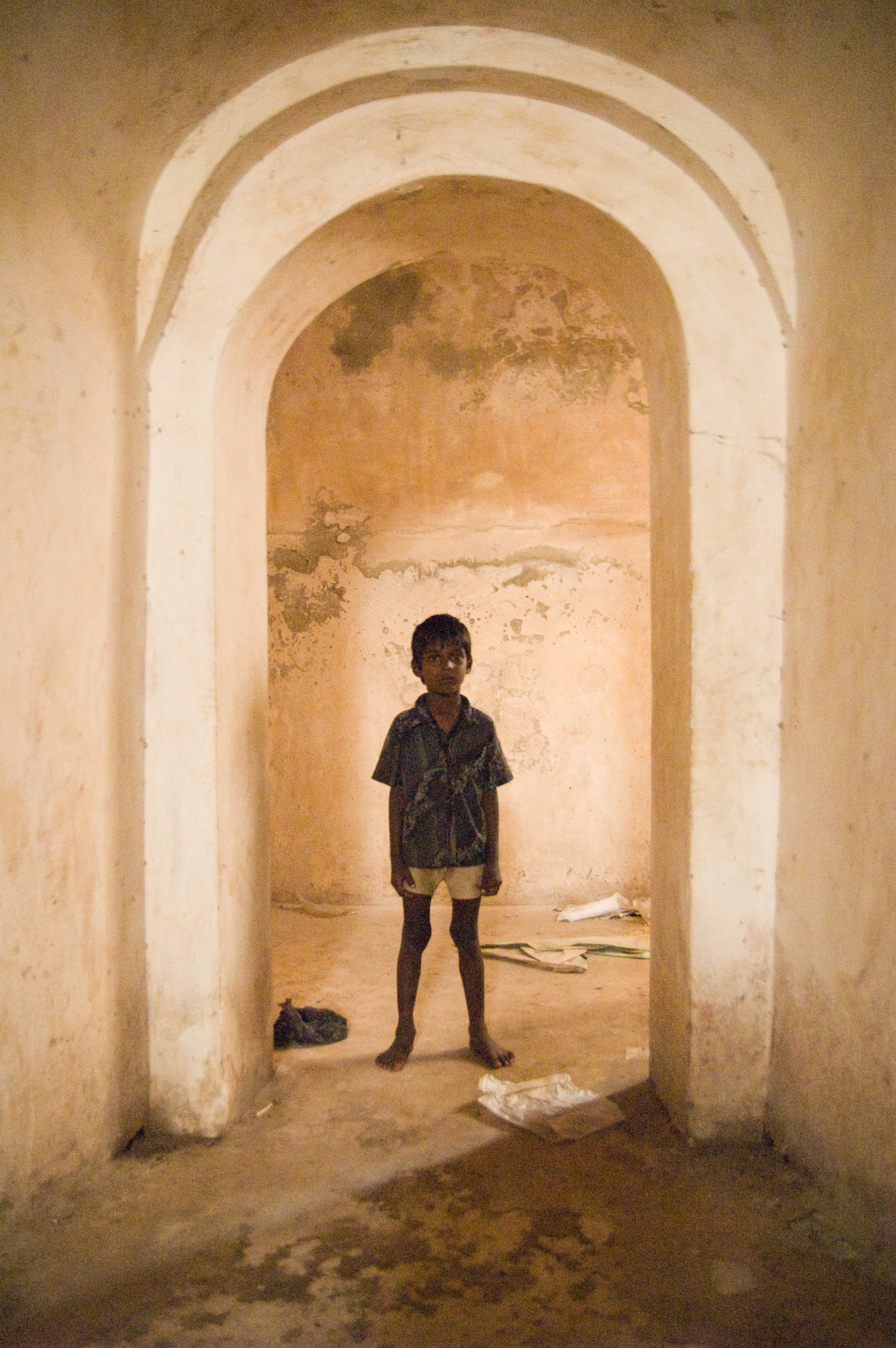
A dungeon at Seringapatam.

=== Firearms ===
The Kodavas revered weapons, such as guns and the traditional sword and dagger, which are essential for their ceremonial purposes and in accordance to their religious and cultural customs. The Kodavas stood guard at the Mysore, Mangalore and Malabar boundary posts. The support of the Kodagu native police, army and offices, held by Jamma ryots (native militia farmers, also called jamma tenure-holders), who were mostly Kodavas while including people from a few other communities as well, exempted the Kodavas from the 1861 Indian Arms Act. The 1878 Indian Arms Act listed among those groups of persons not restricted by the Act: "all persons of Kodava race, and all jumma tenure-holders in Coorg who by their tenures are liable for police and military duties."

== Language and literature ==
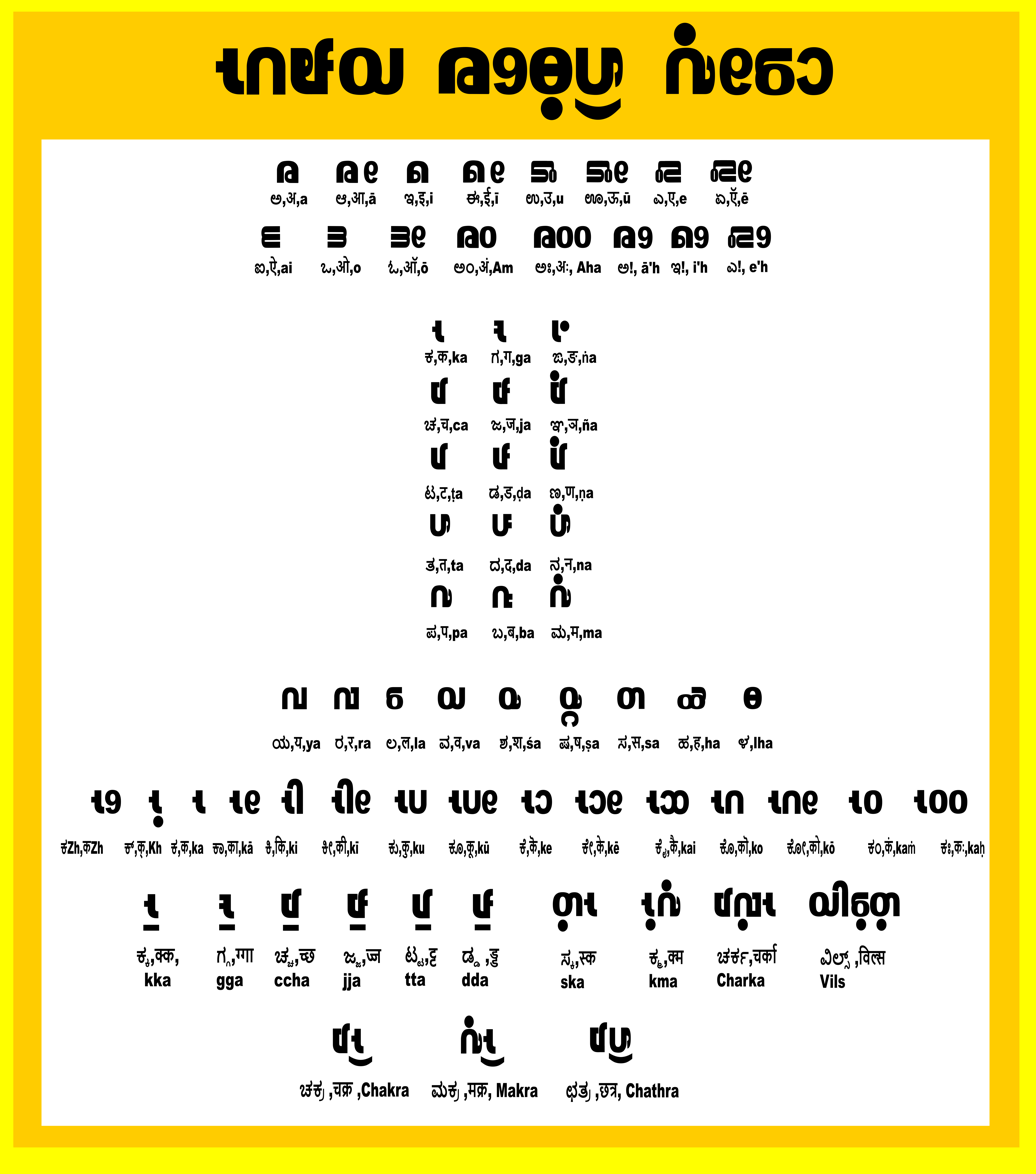
Alphabets in Dr Muthanna's Kodava script

The Kodava language, called Kodava takk, is an independent and has quite a few words from languages of neighboring states as well as from Kannada. Kodava takk similarity in accent and pronunciation with that of Beary bashe, a dialect spoken by Bearys of Coastal Karnataka. Kodava people are the native speakers of Kodava language are origins of district of Kodagu. As per 1991 census, the speakers of Kodava Takk make up to 0.25% of the total population of the Karnataka state. According to Karnataka Kodava Sahitya Academy, apart from Kodavas, 18 other ethnic groups speak Kodava Takk in and outside the district including Amma Kodavas, Kodava Heggade, Iri, Koyava, Banna, Madivala, Hajama, Kembatti, and Meda.

First script for Kodava Thakk was found at Bhagamandala inscription dating back to 1370 AD. Later in the year 1887 Dr. Koravanda Appaiah invented a script for Kodava Thakk, Followed by Dr I.M.Muthanna in 1970, Kiran Subbaiah in 1980, Ponjanda Appaiah in 2003, Dr. Cox in 2005, Charles Henry in 2008. A meeting which was held on 21 February 2022 by Karnataka Kodava Sahitya Academy at Madikeri officially accepted Dr. IM Muthanna's script as the official script of Kodava Thakk. Thus, ending the debate for the need of a script for Kodava Thakk.

== Land and agriculture ==
=== Devarakadu ===
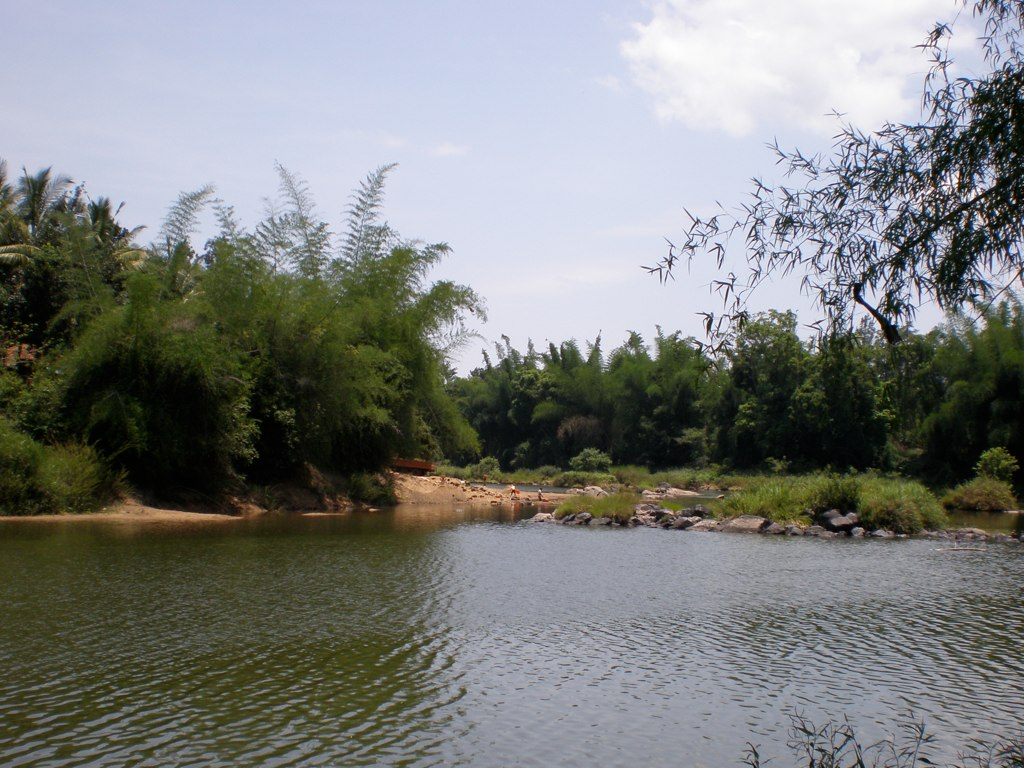
Coorg woods beside the Cauvery

The Kodavas revered nature and their ancestors they formerly hunted for sport, the Kodavas would even conduct ceremonies symbolically uniting in marriage the spirits of killed tigers with the spirit of the hunter, highlighting the intimate relationship between Kodava culture and the wildlife living in their forest realm. Sacred groves, known as devarakadu (devara = God's and kadu = forest), continue to be maintained in their natural state amongst the coffee plantations since the time of the Rajas. Each village has at least one devarakadu, which is believed to be an abode of the gods, with strict laws and taboos against poaching and felling of trees. These groves are also an important storehouse of biodiversity in the district.

=== Jamma ===
A system of land tenure, known as Jamma (privileged tenureship), was formerly instituted in Kodagu during the pre-colonial Paleri Dynasty of the Lingayat Rajas. Jamma agricultural lands were held almost exclusively by Kodavas as a hereditary right, and were both indivisible and inalienable. Importantly, rights over the adjacent uncultivated woods (bane) were also attached to Jamma tenure, such that relatively expansive agricultural-forestry estates have remained intact across Kodagu. The exclusion of plantation crops, such as coffee, from India's Land Ceiling Act has further insulated these holdings from post independence land reform efforts across India. Importantly, rights over the adjacent forests (bane) were also attached to Jamma tenure, such that relatively expansive agricultural-forestry estates have remained intact across Kodagu. A unique feature of Jamma tenure is that tree rights remained with the Rajas, and were subsequently transferred to the colonial and post-independence governments and remains an import determinant of land use practices in the district.

=== Coffee cultivation ===
Coffee cultivatuion is widely believed to have been introduced in the western ghats from the Yemeni port of Mocha by the Muslim saint, Baba Budan, in the 16th century and some time after its introduction, coffee cultivation was embraced by the Kodavas in western Karnataka. Following the British annexation of Kodagu in 1834, large numbers of European planters began settling in the forested mountains to cultivate coffee, dramatically changing the economic and environmental management structures of Kodava society. Today, more than one third of India's coffee is grown in Kodagu district, making it the most important coffee growing district in India, the world's fifth largest coffee-producing country.

== Recent developments ==
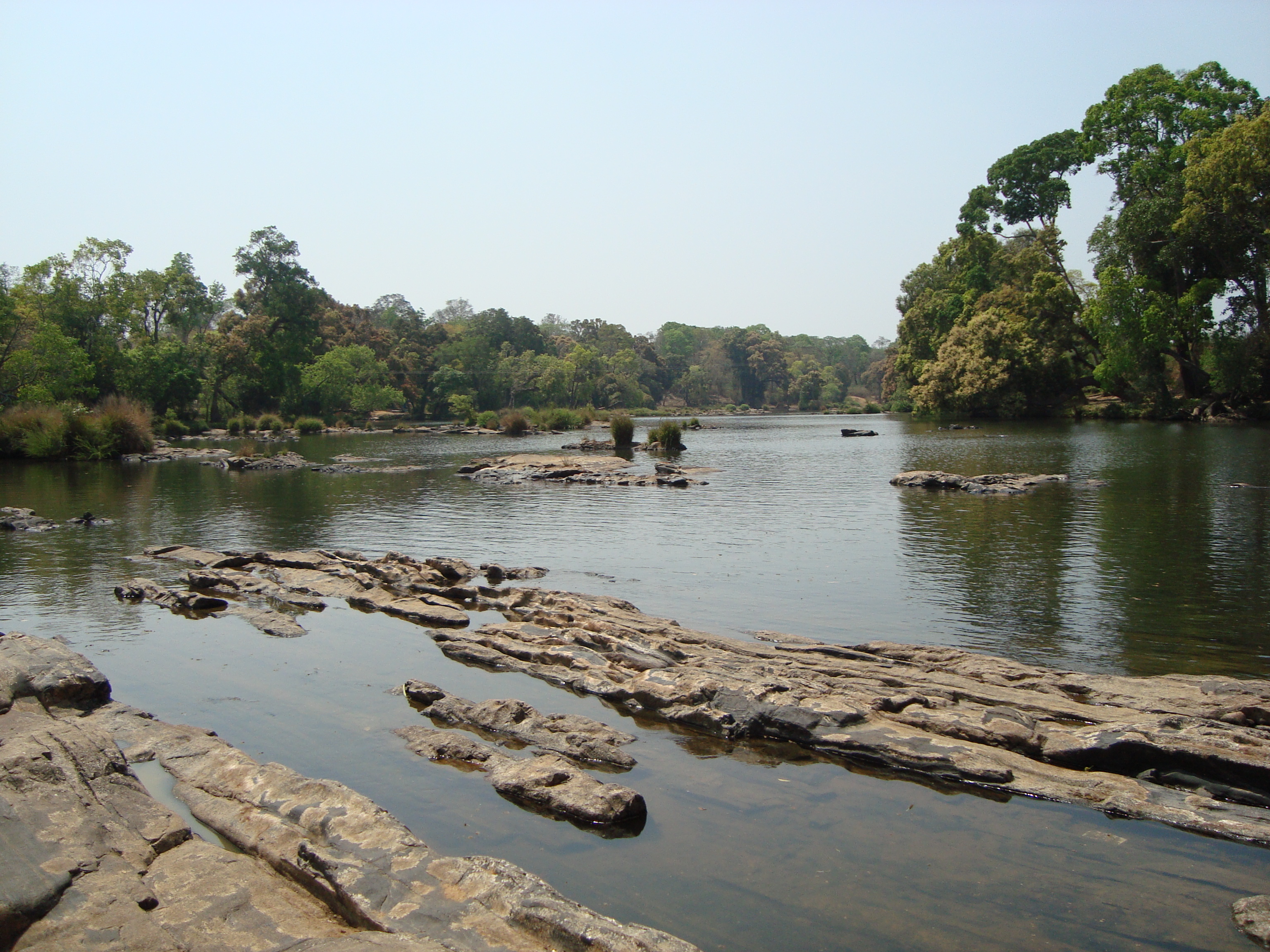
Kaveri River in Kushal Nagar

Lately, some organisations including the Codava National Council (CNC) and Kodava Rashtriya Samiti are demanding Kodava homeland status and autonomy and to Kodagu district and also Scheduled Tribe status to Kodava Tribe The population of the Kodavas is around 1.5 lakh (150,000).

== Demographics and distribution ==
=== Kodavas Proper ===
Kodavas proper are primarily natives of Kodagu. They have a 1000 family names. They are a warrior race and play a dominant role in Kodagu. The Kodava community numbers about one-fifth out of a total population of over 500,000, in Kodagu. Many Kodava people have migrated to areas outside Kodagu, to other Indian cities and regions, predominantly to Bangalore, Mysore, Mangalore, Ooty, Chennai, Mumbai, Kerala, Hyderabad and Delhi for better job prospects. A few of them have now migrated outside India to foreign countries, like North America (the US and Canada), the Middle East (especially Dubai in UAE and Muscat in Oman), the UK and Australia (especially to Sydney where they are prominent members in the financial industry as well as contributing to the health industry).

=== Amma Kodavas ===
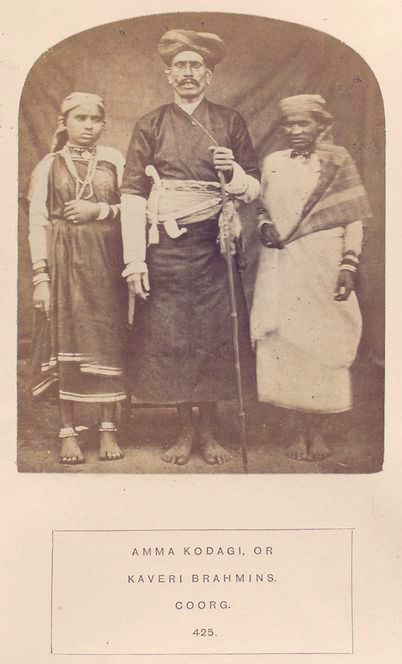
Amma Kodava (Kaveri Brahmin) family, Coorg, 1875

Besides the Kodavas there were other indigenous people who followed the same culture and spoke the same Kodava language. One of them, the Amma Kodavas, were believed to be the original priests' at all important temples in Coorg including temples of Talakaveri, Igguthappa and Irupu. The religious customs and practices of the hill people of Coorg gradually and subtly began to be influenced by the Brahmin practises and rituals. The role of the Coorg priest, via: Amma Kodavas declined and that of the Brahmin priest increased. In due course, the Amma Kodavas had no role to play in the religious aspects of the people of Coorg.

The loss of this important role earned some powerful Brahmin sympathisers, one of whom was a Havyaka Brahmin Thimmapaya, who had a large following of Amma Kodavas. During the later part of the 19th century, it appears that an attempt was made for assimilating the Amma Kodavas into the Brahmin fold. One batch of Amma Kodavas performed the rites to wear the sacred thread. Another batch is reported to have done so early in the 20th Century. Both these batches were assigned the Gothra names of their Brahmin patrons. The process of assimilation did not move any further. Today, many of the Amma Kodavas wear the sacred thread, a large number of them performing the rites a day before marriage (not after puberty, as done by the mainstream Brahmins). There are as many, who do not wear the sacred thread. Some of the Amma Kodavas do not have gotras assigned to them. They are vegetarians and endogamous. However, all other social activities such as marriage, dress and festivals are similar to the Kodavas.

=== Kodagu Brahmins ===
Kodagu Brahmin people have been residing in Coorg since the Haleri dynasty. They have been said to have migrated during that period from the South Canaran area. Their prime occupation was to perform rituals and were Archakas in the temples of Kodagu. Kodagu Brahmins celebrate kodava festivals such as puthari, kaveri sankramana but not kailpodh. They are pure vegetarians and wear the sacred thread. They speak Kannada, Havigannada or Havyaka or Tulu. follow kodava customs to an extent. They have clan system as well like the others some of them are, 'Cukkemane', 'Doddmane', 'Makkimane', 'Paremane', 'Kirumakki mane', 'Narasajjanamane', ' Kadangamakki mane', 'Nooroklunaadumane', 'Mottemane', Mooterimane and many more. They worship spirits or 'theray' and ancestors as well. They perform a ritual at every year end called "Bhandaara pooje" when all the clan members unite for the event. They have 'gothras' assigned just like the amma kodavas. Currently they have settled in bigger cities and even abroad for better occupations. They are also coffee planters and have made a mark in the military and defense services. Being a part of kodava society for many ages they are equipped with weapons i.e. 'thok' or 'kovi' and are used efficiently. They have local cuisines as well like thambuli, majjigehuli, kanile palya, pathrode, akki rotti etc. Jewelry includes 'Jomaale' ,'Kokkethaathi' 'havaladasara', kadaga (coorg kada), 'muttina sara' and 'thaali'. The original Brahmins of Kodagu are either Havyaka or Shivalli type of Brahmins who migrated to this region under various dynastis. A major group of Brahmins are said to have migrated from Haleri during the time of Chola dynasty. Although they have been residents of Kodagu, none of their mother tongue has never been 'Kodava thak', although some of them may know the language to converse.

=== Kodagu Heggade ===
The Kodagu Heggades are another of these indigenous castes of Coorg although originally they were believed to have come from North Malabar. They have around 100 family names. They follow the Kodava habits and customs, dress like other Kodavas and speak Kodava Takk. The Kodagu Heggades and the Amma Kodavas are similar to the Kodavas and hence might have been related to them in the ancient past.

=== Kodava Maaples ===
Some Kodavas were forcibly converted under threat to life by Tipu and his followers; these converts who were descendants of Kodavas were called Kodava Maaplas, and these conversions happened on various forays into Kodagu. During the Third Anglo-Mysore War (1789–1792) 5,000 Kodava men and their family members, escaped from captivity in Seringapatam and returned to Coorg. During the war in 1791, one night the British attacked the Sultan's army which fled. That day the Asadulai (converts) who were seized at Coorg and other places along with the Neze Cardar (lancers), all numbering 10,000 people, escaped with their weapons to Coorg. Tipu's batteries were taken and there was confusion among Tipu's troops during that nightly encounter. According to Moegling, Kodavas, who had been carried away by Tipu with their wives and children, made their escape and returned to their native country (Coorg). These converts remained Muslims as they didn't reconvert to Hinduism.

The descendants of these Muslims, many of them now inter-married with Mappilas of Kerala and Bearys of Tulu Nadu, constitute a very small minority in modern Kodagu. In spite of their change in faith, they maintained their original clan names and dress habits and speak Kodava takk, although now they do follow some Mappila–Beary customs also. Today, many Muslims bear Kodava family names. There is Kathanira, Joypera, Periyanda, Alira, koovalera, Cheeranda, Chakkera, Chimmacheera, Duddiyanda, Kaddadiyanda, and Kolumanda in Virajpet.

Yemmemadu Dargah is the main shrine of the Kodava Muslims revered by the Kodava Hindus as well and is located in a place called Yemmemadu in Kodagu district.

Coorg has a significant Muslim population who are Syeds and Sheikhs who speak Urdu at home or Mappilas who speak Malayalam at home. There are Beary Bhashe speaking Beary Muslims and Nawayathi speaking Nawayath Muslims as well. Muslims of the Syed and the Sheikh clans who were on good terms with Kodavas and their Raja were allowed to remain in Kodagu after the fall of Tipu Sultan.

=== Other communities of Kodagu origin ===
These include communities such as, kodava thiyyar, kodagu Nair, kodagu Koleya, kodagu Airi, kodagu Malekudiya, kodagu Meda, kodagu Kembatti, kodagu Kapala, kodagu Kavadi, kodagu Kolla, kodagu Koyava, kodagu Banna, kodagu Golla, kodagu Kanya, kodagu Maleya and others. . and they culturally ingrained themselves in the Kodagu Society. They speak Kodava takk and follow some Kodagu customs and habits t.

Are bhashe speaking Gowda communities of somwarpet taluk as their name indicates, hail mostly from those districts before the British period Amara sullia and puttur wa under coorg. Originally they are the migrants from Ikkeri (Keladi) Maha Samsthana (present Shimoga, Chikka Magaluru and Hassan Districts). They were originally Natha Pantha and Shivaites owing allegiance to Kigga and Sringeri Matha. Later Emperor Vishnuvardhana's rule they became Vaishnavites and worship 'Tirupati Timmappa' (Balaji of Thirupati) and 'Sabbakka' (Sharada of Sringeri). They are also called Tuluva Gowdas as they spoke Tulu when they came from Ikkeri, later in the Haleri kingdom, and settled the Mangalore-Udupi (Dakshina Kannada-Udupi) region. They now speak the Are Bhashe or Gowda Kannada dialect of Tulu and Kannada. They are said to have 10 Kutumba and 18 Balis as their primordial root families, from which arose around a Nooru Mane or hundred families. In Kodagu, there were quite a few families settled in Kodagu from the time of Lingayat King of Coorg, Rev. G. Richter, in Gazetteer of Coorg (1870) lists them as Tulu Gowdas (Vokkaligas in Kodagu are residents of yelusaviraseeme taluk from immemorial.

=== Caste reservations ===
Around 2000, some of the Kodava language speakers were included in the Other Backward Classes list of Karnataka. The Kodavas were listed as Kodagaru under the Category III A of the Other Backwards Caste (OBC) List of Karnataka State Government. The Coorg National Council had appealed to the State Government to correct this and mention them as Kodavas and to include them in the Central Government Other Backward Castes (OBC) List. Among the other castes included in the Category III A of the State OBC List are the Kodagu Gowda (Gowda).

The Amma Kodava, the Kodagu Banna and the Kodagu Heggade have been included under the Category II A of the State OBC list, while the Kodagu Kapala have been included under Category I A of the State OBC List. All four have been included in the Central Government Other Backward Castes (OBC) List. kodava kembati and kodava kudiya have been included in Scheduled caste and Scheduled tribe List of Karnataka Respectively.

== Eminent Kodavas ==
=== Eminent Kodavas ===
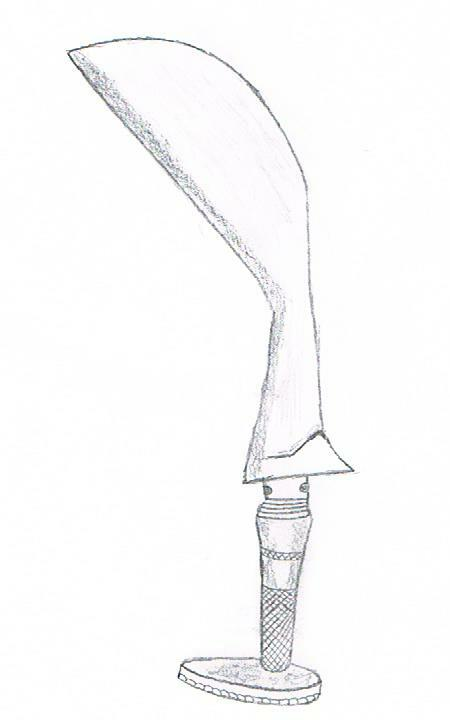
Coorg sword, also called Oidekatti or Ayda Katti (Ayudha Katti)

The Kodavas have contributed immensely towards the growth of the Indian nation, despite them being in small numbers. Their most significant contributions are in the armed forces and in sports. Originally being land-owning militiamen farmers from Kodagu, hence their traditional twin occupations were as agriculturists and as soldiers.

The Kodava ancestors grew paddy and plantation crops like bananas and pepper, their descendants are now into coffee cultivation. The distinguished among them had been local chieftains, palace officials, officers of the Raja's army and brave battle veterans, therefore invariably having attained fame in either government service or in the local army.

=== Army ===
Many Kodavas joined the Indian armed forces both as officers and as servicemen. They distinguished themselves in times of war and peace, army-men are still shown the most respect in Kodagu (Coorg). Quite a number of Kodavas have been martyred on enemy frontiers. Many Kodavas participated in the two World Wars before Indian Independence and in the wars against China and Pakistan after 1947.

Field Marshal Cariappa of the Rajput Regiment and General Thimayya of the Kumaon Regiment were the most distinguished army-men among the Kodavas. Many other Kodavas have been made Lt. Generals, Major Generals, Brigadiers and Air Marshals. Lt. General A. C. Iyappa (or Apparanda Aiyappa) is best remembered for his contributions towards the Corps of Signals and towards Bharat Electronics Limited. There were several war heroes as well such as Nadikerianda Bheemaiah, a JCO who was awarded the Vir Chakra for conspicuous bravery in J&K Operations in 1947, Air Marshal Cheppudira D Subbaia who was a fighter pilot during WW II and was awarded the Vir Chakra and the PVSM, Squadron Leader Ajjamada B Devaiah, (known as the 'wings of fire') another fighter pilot was awarded the Maha Vir Chakra after he shot down an enemy aircraft and died in Pakistan during the 1965 Indo Pak War, Major Ganapathi Puttichanda Somiah, (known as the 'Major who kept his cool') awarded the Maha Vir Chakra, during the Indian Intervention in Sri Lanka, Major Ranjan Chengappa, Shaurya Chakra Awardee who was in Congo for UN mission as part of a peace keeping force, Col Chembanda M Thimanna, awarded the Shaurya Chakra for bravery in counter insurgency operations, Major Chottangada Ganesh Madappa, was awarded Shaurya Chakra posthumously in 1996, Squadron Leader Mandepanda Appachu Ganapathy, awarded the Vir Chakra in 1972 (when as a Flight Lieutenant he shot down Pakistani Sabre Jets). Major (now Retd Maj Gen) K P Nanjappa was awarded the Vir Chakra in 1971.

There was a separate Coorg regiment (now forming a unit of the Indian Regiment of Artillery, this unit being called the 37 (Coorg) Anti-Tank Regiment RIA) which largely included people from non-Kodava backgrounds while the Kodavas themselves served in different other regiments; this is in keeping with the army's non-bias policy according to which people were recruited in regiments other than those belonging to their region and community of birth.

=== Hockey ===
Kodavas have a long history of association with the game of field hockey. The district of Kodagu is considered as the cradle of Indian hockey.

More than 50 Kodavas have represented India in international hockey tournaments, M. P. Ganesh, M.M Somaiah, B. K. Subramani, A. B. Subbaiah, K. M. Chengappa, .K. K. Poonacha, C. S. Poonacha, Jagadish Ponnappa, M. A. Bopanna, Len Aiyyappa, Amar Aiyamma, Arjun Halappa to name a few, out of whom 7 have also participated in the Olympics.

The passion for hockey in Kodagu is so much that teams representing more than each of 200 families participate in an annual Kodava Hockey Festival. This festival is recognised as one of the largest field hockey tournaments in the world and has been referred to the Guinness Book of Records. However it has already found a mention in the Limca Book of Records, which is an Indian variant of the Guinness Book.

=== Other Sports ===
Kodavas have also been known in other individual sport events as well especially in athletics; Ashwini Nachappa, national champion in athletics, Olympian and Arjuna Awardee, Rohan Bopanna, national tennis champion, Joshna Chinappa, squash player, Jagat and Anita Nanjappa, motor racing champions, C.C. Machaiah, (Chenanda Machiah) national boxing champion, Olympian and Arjuna Awardee, Reeth Abraham (née Devaiah; of Kodava parentage), national athletics champion, Arjuna Awardee and Olympian, Arjun Devaiah, national athlete and Arjuna Award winner, Pramila Aiyappa (née Ganapathy), national champion in athletics and Olympian, P G Chengappa, former national badminton player, M R Poovamma (Maachettira Poovamma), national champion in athletics and Olympian and Ashwini Ponnappa, national badminton player. Of late Kodavas have begun to distinguish themselves in cricket. Robin Uthappa, K. P. Appanna, N. C. Aiyappa, K. C. Cariappa and Shyam Ponnappa have represented Karnataka state in national tournaments, like the Ranji trophy, and Bangalore city in the Indian Premier League. Among them, Robin Uthappa went on to play for Indian National Cricket Team, as well.

=== Other fields ===
Well known actress Rashmika Mandanna was born to Suman and Madan Mandanna into a Kodava Hindu family in Virajpet, a town in Kodagu district, Karnataka.

The Kodavas language was a spoken language and had no written literature until 1900. Appanervanda Haridasa Appachcha Kavi, Nadikerianda Chinnappa and Dr. I M Muthanna, have contributed immensely towards developing a literature for this language. The Kodavas are almost all Hindus a few of them had taken up monkhood and contributed towards the development of the religion, especially in Kodagu and Mysore regions, the most famous among them being Swami Shambhavananda, Sadguru Appayya Swami and Swami Narayanananda. In the government service as well there were many prominent Kodavas. One remembers Rao Bahadur IGP P.K.Monnappa, for his contributions towards the Indian Police in South India, be it in Hyderabad, Madras, Mysore or Coorg. Diwan Bahadur Ketoli Chengappa, was the last Chief Commissioner (the governor of a British province which had no elected assembly) of Coorg. There were others like Rai Saheb Muthanna who served in Ceylon (Sri Lanka) and Mesopotamia (Iraq) during WWII and Rao Saheb Pattamada Devaiah, SP of Coorg. Some were judges in the High Court, such as Palecanda Medappa for Mysore and Ajjikuttira S Bopanna for Karnataka. C M Poonacha had been the Chief Minister of Coorg State (1952–'56), MP, Union Minister and later Governor of Orissa and Madhya Pradesh. C B Muthamma was the first woman Indian Foreign Service officer. Mr CG Somaiah was the First IAS Officer to rise to the position of Home Secretary, Chief Vigilance Commissioner (CVC) and Comptroller and Auditor General (CAAG)

== Popular culture ==
The Kodava people and culture have been depicted in a number of movies and books. Some such popular Kannada movies were Huliya Haalina Mevu starring Rajkumar and based on Kodagu-based Kannada author Bharathisutha’s novel of the same name, Muthina Haara directed by Rajendra Singh Babu and starring Vishnuvardhan and Suhasini Maniratnam, and Golden Star Ganesh starrer Mungaru Male. Some of the popular English novels on Kodavas are Kaveri Nambisan’s The Scent of Pepper published in 1996 by Penguin books and Sarita Mandanna’s Tiger Hills which was long listed for the Man Asian Literary Prize. Kaveri Ponnapa, an author and writer on Kodava culture and food brought out a scholarly work, The Vanishing Kodavas which was published in 2013 after about 15 years of research.

== See also ==
- Karnataka ethnic groups
- List of Kodavas
- 71st Coorg Rifles
- 37 (Coorg) Field Regiment
