= Cariappa =

Cariappa is a first name from Kodagu district, Karnataka in South India. It is found among Kodava Hindus. It is pronounced 'Kārya - appā' meaning 'man (appā) of duty (kārya)', not to be confused with the similar sounding name 'Kāri' (black) 'appā' (man), a name for Krishna.

== Notable people ==
The following is a list of notable people with the last name Cariappa.

- K. M. Cariappa (1899–1993), the first Indian commander-in-chief of the Indian Army; Cariappa is his first name.
- K. C. Cariappa (born 1938), former Air Officer in the Indian Air Force and K. M. Cariappa's son
- K. C. Cariappa (cricketer) (born 1994), Indian cricketer; Cariappa is his first name.
- Prema Cariappa, former mayor of Bangalore and Rajya Sabha (Upper House of the Indian Parliament) member; Cariappa is her husband's first name
