= Kannanda Doddayya =

Kannanda Doddayya was a Kodava commander who defeated Hyder Ali's forces thrice. He was also known as Kannana Doddayya and Doddanna.

== Career ==
He was a force commander of about 3,000 Kodavas (Coorgs) who defeated Hyder Ali of Mysore. He served as the general under Muddu Raja, the Haleri dynasty Raja of Kodagu. Hyder Ali sent his army under his commander Fazulla Khan who was defeated by Doddayya thrice. The first time was at Igoor. Before he went on his last battle he told the Raja: “Twice I defeated Hyder’s army and came back to bow to you. But this time I shall not come back.”

== Death ==
Finally, Doddayya died at the battle of Kajur Bagilu despite winning the same battle in 1767. A stone slab was made in his honour and setup in the rice fields. Another Kodava commander, Appachu Mandanna, also died in that same battle. Later, when Hyder's son Tipu Sultan invaded Kodagu, he burnt Kannanda Doddayya's house during the war and hanged twenty-four members of his family in an attempt to defeat and control Kodagu.
