= Kodava Hockey Festival =

Indian field hockey event

The clan of Kodavas in the Indian state of Karnataka have a long history of association with the game of field hockey. The district of Kodagu which is the land of the Kodavas is considered as the cradle of Indian hockey. More than 50 Kodavas have represented India in international hockey tournaments, out of which 7 have also participated in Olympics. B P Govinda, M P Ganesh, M M Somaiya, C S Poonacha are some of the prominent Kodavas who have represented India. The passion for hockey in Kodagu is so much that more than 200 families participate in an annual hockey festival. This festival is recognised as one of the largest field hockey tournaments in the world and has been referred to the Guinness Book of Records. However it has already found a mention in the Limca Book of Records, which is an Indian variant of the Guinness Book.

== Origin ==
The Kodava hockey festival was started in the year 1997 and was the brainchild of 69-year-old Pandanda Kuttappa and Pandanda Kashi Ponnappa. Pandanda Kuttappa was a first division hockey referee and an ex-employee of State Bank of India. He conceived the idea of creating a platform in which the different Kodava families can get together. Realising the passion of hockey in Kodagu, he decided that a hockey festival would be a good event to bring Kodavas together. He also chose the hockey festival because he was disturbed about the growth of junior hockey players from Kodagu. The finances required for the inaugural tournament were provided by Pandanda Kuttappa and by his brother Pandanda Kashi Ponnappa. Pandanda Kashi Ponnappa was a renowned hockey player represented Mysuru University at a very young age and well known teacher. The response was very good and this tournament held at Karada and called as Pandanda Cup attracted around 60 families. Some rules were framed which included that all the team members must belong to the same family (surname) and participate in a full hockey attire. Even women could be a part of the team and it was left to the woman to decide whether she wants to represent the father's family or that of the husband's.

== Growth ==
After the inaugural tournament, an academy called as The Kodava Hockey Academy was started to oversee and have the final say in all matters related to the future tournaments. Each subsequent tournament would be organised annually by a different Kodava family and the name of the family was given as the name of the tournament. The organising family was mainly responsible for arranging the finances and infrastructure needed for the festival. The cost was recovered from the sponsors and raffle tickets. Kodava families which participated in the tournament also shared a part of the cost depending on their capacity and will. The response to the tournament grew year by year and reached a maximum in the year 2003 in which 280 teams participated for the Kaliyanda Cup at Napoklu. The maximum women participation was in the year 2000 when 30 women took part in the Cheppudira Cup held at Ponnampet. The opening and closing ceremonies are held with pomp and splendour and various dances and martial arts of Kodavas are demonstrated. The tournament is inaugurated by a guest by doing a pass-back of the hockey ball using a silver hockey stick. Stalls setup around the venue do brisk business because of the large crowds that come to view the matches.

The 14th edition of the Kodava hockey tournament is being held by the Maneyapanda family in Ponnampet from 18 April to 9 May. The tournament was inaugurated by the Union Minister for Sports and Youth affairs Dr M S Gill. Dr. Gill said here on Sunday that the Government of India would do its bit to raise the sagging fortunes of Indian hockey.

Calling Maneyapanda Kodava Hockey Festival as a "special national occasion", Mr. Gill said he had spoken to president of the International Hockey Federation Leandro Negre that India and other hockey-playing nations in Asia should have a fair share in all matters relating to international hockey, such as management and umpiring. At the same time, he said, India needed experts in all aspects of the game.

An exhibition match was played between All Star Indian XI and Coorg XI in which the latter won 3–2. All Star Indian XI was led by Dhanraj Pillay and Coorg XI was led by C.S. Poonacha.

The 15th edition of the tournament was held at Ponnampet and was hosted by Machamada Family. A total of 228 teams participated in this edition with Palanganda family emerging as winners once again.

The 16th edition of the tournament was held at Ammathi (South Kodagu) and is hosted by Iychettira family. The Iychettira Hockey Cup 2012 saw 217 teams and 3255 players participate in 23 days of action packed Hockey. Over 2 lakh people came to watch the matches and experience the festival atmosphere at the Iychettira Hockey Cup and Palanganda family was the winners again.

The 17th edition of the tournament was held at Balugodu near Virajpet hosted by Madanda family. An exhibition match was played between Punjab XI and Coorg XI ended in a 1–1 draw later. Total of 225 teams participated in Madanda Hockey Fest-2013 and Anjaparavanda grabbed the victory against Strong Palanganda family.

The 18th edition of the tournament was hosted by Thathanda family at Virajpet. Thathanda hockey festival witnessed 242 teams with Kaliyanda as the champions against the strong Palanganda in the finals. Thathanda family took Kodava Hockey Festival to the next level by organizing Rink Hockey along with the usual traditional hockey with the participation of 32 teams and Anjaparavanda as the winners. Thathanda family also holds the credit of hosting 2nd edition of Kodava Cricket Cup in the year 2001.

== Tournaments ==
Kodava Hockey Festival by year
| No. | Year | Name | Held at | Number of teams | Winner | Runners up |
|---|---|---|---|---|---|---|
| 1 | 1997 | Pandanda Cup | Karada | 60 | Kaliyanda | Anjaparavanda |
| 2 | 1998 | Kodira Cup | Kadanga | 116 | Kullettira | Koothanda |
| 3 | 1999 | Ballachanda Cup | Kakotparambu | 140 | Koothanda and Kullettira | - |
| 4 | 2000 | Cheppudira Cup | Ponnampet | 170 | Koothanda | Nellamakkada |
| 5 | 2001 | Nellamakkada Cup | Ammathi | 220 | Koothanda | Cheppudira |
| 6 | 2002 | Chekkera Cup | Hudikeri | 252 | Kullettira | Nellamakkada |
| 7 | 2003 | Kaliyanda Cup | Napoklu | 280 | Nellamakkada | Konerira |
| 8 | 2004 | Maleyanda Cup | Madapur | 235 | Koothanda | Nellamakkada |
| 9 | 2005 | Biddanda Cup | Madikeri | 222 | Nellamakkada | Koothanda |
| 10 | 2006 | Kallichanda Cup | Ponnampet | 217 | Palanganda | Machamada |
| 11 | 2007 | Mandettira Cup | Kakotparambu | 186 | Mandepanda | Anjaparavanda |
| 12 | 2008 | Alamengada Cup | Ponnampet | 216 | Anjaparavanda | Koothanda |
| 13 | 2009 | Mandepanda Cup | Ammathi | 231 | Nellamakkada | Machamada |
| 14 | 2010 | Maneyapanda Cup | Ponnampet | 214 | Palanganda | Mukkatira(Bonda) |
| 15 | 2011 | Machamada Cup | Ponnampet | 228 | Palanganda | Kaliyanda |
| 16 | 2012 | Iychetira Cup | Ammathi | 217 | Palanganda | Kaliyanda |
| 17 | 2013 | Madanda Cup | Balugodu | 225 | Anjaparavanda | Palanganda |
| 18 | 2014 | Thathanda Cup | Virajpet | 242 | Kaliyanda | Palanganda |
| 19 | 2015 | Kuppanda Cup | Virajpet | 255 | Palanganda | Chendanda |
| 20 | 2016 | Shantheyanda Cup | Madikeri | 299 | Kaliyanda | Palanganda |
| 21 | 2017 | Biddatanda | Napoklu | 306 | Chendanda | Paradanda |
| 22 | 2018 | Kulletira | Napoklu | 329 | Chendanda | Anjaparavanda |
| 23 | 2023 | Appachettolanda | Napoklu | 336 | Kuppanda (Kaikeri) | Kulletira |
| 24 | 2024 | Kundyolanda | Napoklu | 360 | Chendanda | Nellamakkada |
| 25 | 2025 | Muddanda | Madikeri | 451 | Mandepanda | Chendanda |
| 26 | 2026 | Chenanda | Napoklu | 383 | Kulletira | Cheppudira |

== Most Titles ==
Kodava Hockey Festival Most Titles list
| Rank. | Family | Winners | Runners up | Winning years |
|---|---|---|---|---|
| 1 | Palanganda | 5 | 3 | 2006, 2010, 2011, 2012, 2015 |
| 2 | Koothanda | 4 | 3 | 1999 (Joint Winners with Kulletira), 2000, 2001, 2004 |
| 3 | Kulletira | 4 | 1 | 1998, 1999 (Joint winners with Koothanda), 2002, 2026 |
| 3 | Kaliyanda | 3 | 2 | 1997, 2014, 2016 |
| 3 | Nellamakkada | 3 | 4 | 2003, 2005, 2009 |
| 3 | Chendanda | 3 | 2 | 2017, 2018, 2024 |
| 7 | Anjaparavanda | 2 | 3 | 2008, 2013 |
| 7 | Mandepanda | 2 | 0 | 2007, 2025 |
| 9 | Kuppanda (Kaikeri) | 1 | 0 | 2023 |

Kodava Rink Hockey Festival by year
| No. | Year | Name | Held at | Number of teams | Winner | Runners up |
|---|---|---|---|---|---|---|
| 1 | 2014 | Thathanda Cup | Virajpet | 32 | Anjaparavanda | Chendanda |

== See also ==
- Kodava
- Kodagu
- Field hockey in India
