= Cukkemane =

Hindu surname

Cukkemane or Kukkemane or Cuckemane is surname or a family name belonging to members of the Havyaka Brahmin Community. They belong to the Gautama gotra; they originate from and are mainly based in Kodagu (Coorg), Karnataka, a state in South India. They are from Kukke which was part of Amara Sulya district, formerly in the old kingdom of Kodagu.

== Origins of Cukkemane ==
Many centuries ago, a Brahmin family of Gautama gotra from Sagara taluka in Shimoga (Shivamogga) district in Karnataka migrated to the hamlet Saravu in Kodapadavu village in Bantwal taluk of Dakshina Kannada district. During a particular point in history, there was no male heir to continue the family. The then family members went to the Kukke Subramanya Temple & prayed to Subramanya to bless them with a male heir. They brought home a Shiva Linga for daily worship from the temple. Within the same temple complex, they also sought the blessings of Lakshmi Narasimha, with an assurance to him, that he would be the kuladevaru or Kuldevta of the family henceforth. A male heir was thus born and the family continued. Then on the descendants of this family identified themselves as belonging to Cukkemane or Kukkemane deriving it from "Kukke" - the name of Subramanya & "Mane" – which in Kannada means house, therefore the name meant the House of the Kukke Subramanya. Prior to accepting Lakshmi Narasimha as the Cukkemane family deity, Goddess Sri Durgaparmeshwari was the Kuladevaru or the family deity. Therefore, even today some members of the Cukkemane in Saravu, worship Lakshmi Narasimha as the Mane Devaru - God of the House, at noon and Goddess Sri Durgaparameshwari as the kuladevaru – God of the Clan or family, at night.

== History and myth and fact ==
It is said that centuries ago one of the ancestors of Cukkemane, was a staunch devotee of Shiva and possessed a Shivalinga & worshipped it with a great devotion. As he sensed his life on earth nearing an end, he was worried as to who would perform the daily rituals and care for them at all times as he did. Possessed with this thought, he decided to install this shivalinga in the garbha gudi – the sanctum sanctorum of the Subramanya in the Kukke Subramanya Temple. Having done so, when his time came, he died, content with the knowledge that they would be well taken care of. However, many years later, some jealous elements, made off with the linga and it was not found for some centuries, until about 250–150 years ago it was found in the forest behind the Kukke Subramanya Temple, and re-installed. However, certain sections do not agree with the earlier part of the story and just reiterate that the latter part of it, about the idol being found in the forest is true and that nothing else is associated with it. Yet, many members of the Cukkemane family pay a yearly visit to the Temple and perform prescribed rituals for Subramanya along with this particular Shivalinga believing it to be installed there by their forefather. Rituals are also performed for Lakshmi Narasimha and Adishesha.

== Caste, language and belief ==
The Cukkemanes belong to the Havyaka Brahmin community of Hinduism & speak mainly in Hosa (new) Kannada as spoken in Bangalore, Mysore etc. and Havigannada (Havyaka Kannada) dialects. They belong to the Gautama gotra. They further follow and perform the rituals as per the Yajurveda among the four veda - the holy scriptures of the Hindus & are followers of the Advaita philosophy propounded by Sri Adi Shankaracharya. Among the Math they follow the Ramachandrapura Math and Pontiff head of the Math, Shree Shree Raghaveshwara Bharathi Mahaswamiji is the Kulaguru - the divine mentor, teacher & instructor to the family as to many other Havyaka families as well.

== See also ==
- Raghaveshwara Bharathi
- Adi Shankaracharya
- Havigannada dialect
- Gautama Maharishi
