= Chandra Varma =

Legendary ancestor of the Kodavas

Chandra Varma is the name of the legendary ancestor of the Kodavas (Kodagas, Coorgs or Coorgis).

== Sources ==
The legend of Chandra Varma is found in four chapters (11 to 14) of the Kaveri Purana which is part of the Skanda Purana.

== Kadamba Origin ==
According to Col Wilks, B L Rice and B D Ganapathy, the Coorgs or Kodagus (Kodavas) were Kadambas who were led by a king named Chandra Varma.

== Legend ==
Chandra Varma was the fourth son of Chandravamshi Kshatriya Emperor Siddartha of Dravida Matsya desha. There were a number of Matsya deshas across India, while the main one was in North India. Dravida was a name for South India. Chandra Varma had an army and settled in Kodagu (Coorg), which was called Kroda desha at that time. A devotee of Mother Goddess Parvathi, Chandra Varma went on a pilgrimage across peninsular India with his army to Jagannath, Tirupati, Kanchi, Chidambaram, Srirangam, Dhanushkoti, Rameshwaram and Ananthasayana and became the first king of Kodagu. He married a Shudra goddess, an apsara who was made by Parvathi and who worked as a peasant, and had ten sons.

His sons married the daughters of the king of Vidarbha and his Shudra queen. Chandra Varma was succeeded as king by his eldest son Devakanta. Legend has it that it was during the lifetime of Devakanta that the river Kaveri originated in Kodagu and flowed through South India. The Kaveri Purana states that Chandra Varma's progeny levelled the land, brought it under cultivation and invited Brahmins and other castes to settle the region.
