= Jagat and Anita Nanjappa =

Indian racing driver

Jagat and Anita Nanjappa are a well-known couple in the sport of motor racing in India. They belong to the Kodava community and are natives of Kodagu district of Karnataka. They have participated and won many motorbike and car rallies in India. Jagat is usually the driver while his wife Anita dons the role of the navigator. Together, they have won nine Indian National Rally Riders Championship awards in the motorbike section from 1986 to 1996. Known for their grit and determination, they once completed a rally despite having a flat rear tyre with Anita having to sit on the petrol tank of the bike for a distance of 70 kilometres (43 mi) to reduce the weight on the flat tyre.

== Initiation ==
Jagat, who grew up in Kodagu, was inspired to take up racing by his father Appanna, who was a fast driver. He started racing bikes as a hobby in the year 1981. His family was mainly engaged in growing coffee, and Jagat had ample time to pursue his hobby. The winding, muddy, traffic-less roads of Kodagu gave him further motivation to drive fast. He started rallying with bikes but later graduated to cars. He was later joined by his wife Anita, who after marriage became his navigator in the rallies he participated. They started winning different forms of rallies like TSD (Time, Speed and Distance), stage and raid rallies. Their victories led MRF to sponsor them, and Jagat and Anita raced under the title Team MRF in the subsequent rallies.

== Victories ==
Jagat and Anita won the Annual Indian National Rally Riders Championship in the motorbike section nine times between 1986 and 1996 losing out only in the years 1990 and 1992. Some of the other rallies won by the couple include:

- The Great Desert Rally in 1988.
- The Coimbatore rally in 1992.
- The MASA rally held at Mumbai in the years 1993 and 1994.
- The Popular rally held at Kochi in the years 1993 and 1994.

In car racing, they were runners up in the Indian National Racing championship in the 1400cc category in the years 1998, 2000 and 2001.

== Promoting the sport ==
Jagat and Anita started the Universal Sports Club in the year 2002 in Bangalore with the objectives of introducing new members to the sport, encourage racing enthusiasts, promote the sport and strive towards the improvement of motorsport infrastructure in India. The inaugural event organised by the club was a hill climb race for cars and bikes at the Nandi Hills. They also started the Nanjappas Racing Foundation with an aim to professionally organise motorsport events in India like drag racing, go-karting and motocross.

Jagat has also lent his expertise in designing dirt race tracks and has been chosen by Ford India for laying tracks in different cities of India where enthusiasts can test ride Ford's automobiles on those tracks. One of the major events organised by Jagat was Burnout which was a drag race held during Bangalore Habba, the annual cultural event held in Bangalore. This race which took place in the Jakkur Airfield attracted around 20,000 spectators.
