= K. P. Appanna =

Indian cricketer

Personal information
- Full name: Kotarangada Prabhu Appanna
- Born: 20 December 1988 (age 37); Kodagu, Karnataka, India
- Batting: Right-handed
- Bowling: Left-arm orthodox
- Role: Bowler

Domestic team information
- Years: Team
- 2006–2013: Karnataka
- 2009–2012: Royal Challengers Bangalore
- 2009–2012: South Zone
- FC debut: 23 November 2006 Karnataka v Baroda
- Last FC: 22 December 2013 Karnataka v Mumbai
- LA debut: 27 February 2008 Karnataka v Hyderabad
- Last LA: 28 February 2013 Karnataka v Bengal

Career statistics
| Competition | FC | LA | T20 |
|---|---|---|---|
| Matches | 36 | 28 | 24 |
| Runs scored | 238 | 45 | 13 |
| Batting average | 13.22 | 11.25 | 13.00 |
| 100s/50s | 0/0 | 0/0 | 0/0 |
| Top score | 45 | 9* | 9* |
| Balls bowled | 7,689 | 1,428 | 414 |
| Wickets | 100 | 40 | 21 |
| Bowling average | 37.78 | 28.60 | 25.23 |
| 5 wickets in innings | 3 | 1 | 0 |
| 10 wickets in match | 1 | 0 | 0 |
| Best bowling | 6/68 | 5/56 | 4/19 |
| Catches/stumpings | 12/– | 12/– | 7/– |
- Source: ESPNcricinfo, 24 May 2024

Kotarangada Prabhu Appanna (born 20 December 1988) is an Indian cricketer who played for Karnataka and Royal Challengers Bangalore as a specialist slow left-arm orthodox bowler and a right-handed batsman.

== Early life ==
Appanna was born in Virajpet, Kodagu, Karnataka.

== Cricket career ==
In 2001 Appanna represented Karnataka at Under-14 level, later playing at Under-15, Under-17 and Under-19 level.

Appanna made his first-class debut for Karnataka as a 17-year-old in 2006 against Baroda, taking two wickets in the first innings in which he bowled. He made four further appearances in the competition, as Karnakata finished second in Elite Group A. In February 2007, Appanna made his first of his four Under-19 Test appearance for India against New Zealand. In August 2007 he played for India Under-19s in Sri Lanka.

He has also represented South Zone.

He was selected in the squad for Royal Challengers Bangalore for the 2009 Indian Premier League. He played again for Bangalore in the 2010 tournament, however was not contracted for 2011. In January 2012 he signed for the 2012 tournament after a strong season for Karnataka.
