= Prema Cariappa =

Indian political and social worker

Member of Parliament, Rajya Sabha
- In office 2002–2007
- Constituency: Karnataka

Mayor of Bangalore
- In office 2000–2001
- Preceded by: Padmavati Gangadhara Gowda
- Succeeded by: P R Ramesh

Deputy Mayor of Bangalore
- In office 1994–1995

Personal details
- Born: Somaiyanda Kushalappa Prema; 15 July 1951 (age 75) Virajpet, Coorg State, India
- Party: Indian National Congress
- Spouse: Iychettira M. Cariappa
- Children: 2

Iychettira Prema Cariappa is an Indian political and social worker. A politician from Indian National Congress party, she was a former Mayor of Bangalore and a former MP (member of the Parliament of India), as she was representing Karnataka in the Rajya Sabha, the upper house of the Indian Parliament. She is also the chairperson of the Central Social Welfare Board.

== Personal life ==
Prema Cariappa was born in Virajpet on 15 August 1951 to Somaiyanda B. Kushalappa and Thangamma. She completed her college education in Mysore where she studied Bachelor of Arts from Teresian College. Later she married Iychettira M. Cariappa on 13 June 1971. They have two children, a son and a daughter.

== Career ==
=== Mayor of Bangalore ===
During 1990–91, Prema Cariappa had been the Chairperson of the Public Accounts Committee, Bangalore City Corporation. Between 1991 and 2001, she was a Corporator in the Bangalore City Corporation. In the years 1991–93, she was Deputy Leader of the Bangalore City Corporation. In 1996–97 she became the Party Leader of the Bangalore City Corporation. In the years1996-99, she was Secretary for the Karnataka Pradesh Congress Committee. She first became the deputy mayor of Bangalore in 1994–95 and then later she became the Mayor of Bangalore in 2000–01, hence becoming the first woman to have occupied both positions.

=== Member of the Rajya Sabha ===
She was elected to the Rajya Sabha for a six-year term in April 2002. On 16 June 2004, she was appointed the Chief Whip of the Congress Party in the Rajya Sabha. During the winter session of 2006, she had strongly supported the Women's Reservation Bill along with other women politicians from across parties.

=== Chairperson, Central Social Welfare Board ===
On 16 June 2008, she took over as chairperson of the Central Social Welfare Board.

=== Social Welfare ===
She has worked for the uplift of the poor, widows and destitutes, the development of cities and villages, the improvement of water supply and sanitation and the maintenance of green cover.

=== Various Organisations ===
In 1998–99 she was Chairman of Public Works & Town Planning. In 2000–2002 she was Member of Indian Institute of Public Administration. Between April 2002 and Feb. 2004 she was Member of Committee on Urban and Rural Development. Between August 2002 and February 2004 she was Member of Consultative Committee for the Ministry of Commerce and Industry Member, Hindi Salahakar Committee (Sub-Committee on Science and Technology). From August 2002 onwards she is Member of Committee on External Affairs Member, Committee on Empowerment of Women Member, Committee on Government Assurances. From Oct. 2004 onwards she is Member of Consultative Committee for the Ministry of Urban Development. From Dec. 2004 onwards she is Member of Central Silk Board Member, Coffee Board. She is also the President and Advisor for various Mahila Samajas and sports organizations, as well as the President of the Karnataka State Harijan Sevak Sangh.

=== Conferences ===
She participated in a World Conference on Women's Security and Gender Equality held at Bangkok, Thailand in September 2002, a Special Session on Children held at New York, U.S.A. in 2002, a World Conference on 'Making the World a Better Place' organised by Brahmakumaries at Mount Abu, Rajasthan, a South East Asia Seminar on AIDS held at Islamabad, Pakistan in 2005 and an Inter -Parliamentary Union (IPU) Conference on"Beyond Beijing: Towards Gender Equality in Politics", as a national delegate at UN Headquarters in New York in March 2005. She attended World Mayors Conference at Berlin, Germany in 2002 and visited China at the invitation of Indo-China Friendship Society to strengthen relationship and mutual understanding among people of the two countries.
