= Swami Shambhavananda =

Hindu monk and beekeeper

Swami Shambhavananda (1894–1972) was an Indian Hindu monk who pioneered beekeeping in Kodagu and secondary education in Mysore.

Born in Halugunda village in the Thelapanda family of Kodagu as Chengappa, Shambhavananda joined the Ramakrishna Order at its Bangalore center in 1917. He was an initiated disciple of Swami Brahmananda and ordained into sannyas in 1924.

Shambhavananda was the first president of the Ramakrishna Saradashrama in Ponnampet, Kodagu. In 1941, he became president of Sri Ramakrishna Ashrama, Mysore, holding that position until he died. He was also a trustee of the Ramakrishna Math and a member of the governing body of the Ramakrishna Mission.

In Mysore Shambhavananda founded Sri Ramakrishna Vidyashala, a renowned residential school for boys. He also established the Vedanta College or the Ramakrishna Institute of Moral and Spiritual Education (RIMSE). His reputation was that of an efficient administrator, a strict disciplinarian, an enthusiastic colleague, and a visionary educator.

In Kodagu Shambhavananda is renowned for his effort to eradicate malaria. Singing solle paata ("song of the mosquito") in Kodava Takk in the 1930s and 1940s, he walked from village to village to educate illiterate citizens about the cause and eradication of malaria.

Shambhavananda pioneered modern beekeeping in Kodagu in 1928. Beekeeping was eminently suitable to Kodagu and would contribute to the economic strength of the local people. Aided by the Karnataka government, Shambhavaanda's effort resulted in Kodagu making rapid progress in modern beekeeping from 1931 to 1941. India's first beekeepers' co-operative society was formed in Virajpet in 1936.
