= Swami Narayanananda =

Personal life
- Born: Swami Narayanananda; 12 April 1902 Madikeri, Karnataka, India
- Died: 26 February 1988 (aged 85)
- Occupation: Teacher of Vedanta philosophy

Religious life
- Religion: Hinduism

Swami Narayanananda (12 April 1902 – 26 February 1988) was a teacher of Vedanta philosophy, and founder of a tradition called The Universal Religion.

== Life and work ==
He was born in Kongana, B. Shettigeri, a village in Coorg, Karnataka state, South India. From an early age, he practised regular meditation. After finishing his studies, he renounced the world in 1929 and joined the Ramakrishna Mission. After a few years, he left for the Himalayas and practised intense meditation. In 1933, he attained the supreme state called nirvikalpa samadhi (superconscious state or nirvana). After that, he remained in seclusion for many years, studying the mind-functions and writing books. Especially after the partition of India in 1947, and seeing the atrocities there, his "heart melted, as it were", and he wrote some more books.

The books were published slowly, and spread also to the Western countries. He began to accept disciples. In Denmark, in particular, he had many disciples. In 1971, he went for the first time to Denmark, and continued to visit this country every year for 5–7 months until 1987. An ashrama (monastery) was established in Gylling, Denmark (Jutland, near Aarhus) which is the main centre today. Ashramas were also established in India, Sweden, Germany, Norway and the USA. The books were printed and published first in Rishikesh, India, and later printed and published at Narayana Press, Gylling, Denmark. Swami Narayanananda's works (or part of them) have been translated into many languages, particularly Danish and German. Some of them were translated into Tamil through his disciples Swami Nityananda and the late Swami Sadananda.

Swami Narayanananda died in Mysore, India, at the age of 85.

== Teachings ==
Swami Narayanananda called his teachings "The Universal Religion," implying that they are dealing with Truth, irrespective of caste, creed, sex, nationality, race, etc. He gives guidance to spiritual seekers. He emphasizes the moral code of conduct as a basis for spiritual development, and puts particular stress on sexual sublimation implying brahmacharya – celibacy or (for married people and couples) moderation in sexual life, as a means to maintain and improve physical, mental and spiritual health. His works include among others the following subjects: philosophy, psychology, religion, spirituality, yoga, meditation and kundalini shakti (the primal power in man).

== Bibliography ==
(with years of 1st editions)

1. The Secrets of Mind-Control (1954)
2. The Way to Peace, Power and Long Life (1945)
3. The Primal Power in Man or The Kundalini Shakti (1950)
4. The Ideal Life and Moksha (Freedom) (1951)
5. Revelation (1951)
6. The Mysteries of Man, Mind and Mind-Functions (1951)
7. The Gist of Religions (1955)
8. A Practical Guide to Samadhi (1957)
9. Mind, Its Source and Culture (1958)
10. The Secrets of Prana, Pranayama and Yoga-Asanas (1959)
11. Brahmacharya, Its Necessity and Practice for Boys and Girls (1960)
12. The End of Philosophy (1962)
13. The Basis of Universal Religion (1963)
14. Caste, Its Origin, Growth and Decay (1955)
15. God and Man (1965)
16. Sex-Sublimation (1955)
17. A Word to Sadhaka (spiritual aspirant) (1955)
18. Wisdom (1971)
19. Your Birth-Right (1973)
20. The Aim of Life (1974)
21. The Universal Religion (1975)
22. Your Hidden Treasures (1977)
23. Brahman and the Universe (1978)
24. Birthday Messages 1955-79 (1979)
25. Questions and Answers (1979)
26. The Essence of Life (1980)
27. Religion and Philosophy (1980)
28. Life Behind Death (1980)
29. Within you (1981)
30. India and the Rishis (1981)
31. Brain, Mind and Consciousness (1982)
32. Consciousness under Different States (1982)
33. Reality Behind Life (1983)
34. God or the Ocean of Consciousness by Itself or in Itself (1983)
35. God, Kundalini Shakti and Mind (1984)
36. Truth Eternal (1984)

The above volume numbers refer to the first edition of The Complete Works of Swami Narayanananda (1979–1984). The first 12 volumes are the "major works" whereas volume 13-36 are the "minor works" (small books).

A second edition of the Complete Works was published in 2001–2002 in 18 volumes. The minor works (volumes 13–36 above) have here been collected into three volumes (Minor Works I–III, vol. 13–15), and the following works are added:

- Vol. 16: Birthday Messages, Poems and Consolations (Birthday Messages 1980–87 are here added, compared to the 1st ed. of Complete Works)
- Vol. 17: Selected Articles 1933–1986
- Vol. 18: Autobiography of Swami Narayanananda (here in one volume – previously published separately in two illustrated and annotated volumes)

== Film ==
Yoga. The Danish Film Museum. Hagen Hasselbalch, 1975, 83 min. https://www.danmarkpaafilm.dk/film/yoga
