= B. D. Ganapathy =

Indian author and journalist

- Born: 1920; Besagoor, Coorg, India
- Died: 1997 (aged 76–77)
- Occupations: Author, journalist
- Writing career
- Notable works: Kodavas (Coorgs), their customs and culture

Bācamāḍa Ḍevaiah Gaṇapati (1920–1997) was an Indian writer, scholar and journalist writing in English, Kannada and Kodava Takk, covering religion, anthropology and philosophy. He is particularly noted for his coverage of the Kodagu (Coorg) region and the Kodava ethno-linguistic group, his own birthplace and community.

== Life ==
Ganapathy was born in Besagoor village in Coorg in 1920. He was a journalist for a newspaper in Karnataka state, and author of several books on Kodavas and other subjects in Kodava Takk, Kannada and English languages.

Ganapathy died in 1997.

== Indian Independence Movement ==
During the Indian Independence Movement, he was the sub-editor of the Kodagu, a pro-Independence weekly Kannada newspaper founded by his father-in-law, editor and freedom fighter Pandyanda I. Belliappa, who was known as Kodagu's Gandhi. In 1942 the British India authorities restricted the publication of the Kodagu weekly and had B. D. Ganapathy imprisoned along with his father-in-law.

== Books ==
Among Ganapathy's most noted works is his 1967 Kodavas (Coorgs), their customs and culture published by the Kodagu Ltd., also called the Coorg company, which owned the Kodagu weekly. Other works include: The Eternal Quest (1970), Naṅga Koḍava (1973 in Kodava takk), Kodavas (1980) and Kanni Kāvēri (1990 in Kodava Takk). Among his works two books are in the Kodava Language: Nanga Kodava and Kuttambolicha. His Kannada book on Kodava culture Kodagu mattu Kodavaru has won him the State Academy Award. He wrote 11 works in 16 publications and in three languages.

Recently, efforts are being made to foster Kodava literature and for the same purpose the Kodava Thak Parishat was established in 1978. The first conference was presided over by B. D. Ganapathi. A book has been written about him in 2002.

== See also ==
- Appachcha Kavi
- I. M. Muthanna
