= Nitin Kushalappa =

Indian author

- Born: Virajpet, Kodagu, Karnataka
- Other names: Mookonda Kushalappa, Mookonda Nitin Kushalappa, Nitin Kushalappa M. P.
- Education: Clarence High School, St. Joseph's Pre-University College, CMR Institute of Technology(BE), Kuvempu University (MA), Alliance University (EPGDM)
- Occupations: Author, Engineer
- Known for: Thirke (2022), Dakshin: South Indian Myths and Fables Retold (2023)
- Awards: Sahitya Akademi Bal Sahitya Puraskar for English in 2025

Nitin Kushalappa M. P. is an Indian author of books and articles. His book "Dakshin: South Indian Myths and Fables Retold" (2023) won the Sahitya Akademi's Bal Sahitya Puraskar in 2025. He is known for identifying and naming the Thirke temple script of Kodagu (Coorg).

== Early life ==
Kushalappa was born Mookonda Poonacha Nitin Kushalappa (M. P. Nitin Kushalappa) in a Kodava Hindu family. Mookonda is the family name and both Nitin and Kushalappa are his first names. He studied in Bangalore in Clarence High School, St. Joseph's Pre-University College, CMR Institute of Technology (BE), Kuvempu University (MA) (correspondence course) and Alliance University (EPGDM) (weekend classes). Nitin hails from Kodagu (Coorg), a region rich in oral lore.

== Career ==
Nitin Kushalappa is a lead engineer in the software development industry. Kushalappa has also been working towards preserving the Kodava language and culture. He is the researcher working for the online Kodava Virtual Museum. He has done work on an old temple script, thirke. In an interview with Anushree Madhavan of The New Indian Express, Nitin admits that Coorg and the Pattole Palame are constant influences in his works.

Kushalappa has books on local history, a translation from Kannada to English on Pandyanda Belliappa, and a biography to his credit. His book 'The Major who kept his Cool' is the biography of an army hero Lt Col (then Major) P S Ganapathi MVC, who protected his men while they were in hostile territory. Nitin has co-authored a book on the native religious practises of Kodagu. His various articles have been published by the Deccan Herald, where he is a columnist, and Star of Mysore. He also writes under the names Mookonda Kushalappa, Mookonda Nitin Kushalappa, and Nitin Kushalappa M P.

== Awards ==
He is the author of Amazon bestsellers Bigfoot's The House of Awadh (2019), Puffin Books' Dakshin: South Indian Myths and Fables Retold (2023) and A Hoysala Adventure (2025) and Rupa Publications's Folktales, Myths and Legends from the Deccan (2026). The House of Awadh was nominated for the Sahitya Akademi's Bal Sahitya Puraskar in 2023. Dakshin is a children's book, a collection of 15 South Indian folktales, published in 2023. This book won him the Sahitya Akademi's Bal Sahitya Puraskar in 2025. Dakshin was also shortlisted for the 2023 Atta Galatta-Bangalore Literature Festival Book Prize in the children's fiction category.

=== Awards and nominations ===
Work (Publication Year)	Award	Category	Result	Award Year
The House of Awadh (2019)	Bal Sahitya Puraskar for English	Children's Literature (novella)	Nominated	2023
Dakshin: South Indian Myths and Fables Retold (2023)	AG-BLF (Atta Galatta Bangalore Literature Festival) Prize	Children's Fiction	Shortlisted	2023
Dakshin: South Indian Myths and Fables Retold (2023)	Bal Sahitya Puraskar for English	Children's Literature (Short Stories)	Won	2025
A Hoysala Adventure (2025)	FIHCR's Anant Pai Prize	Indian History Writing for Children (Authors Category)	Longlisted	2026

== Bibliography (Books and others) ==
=== Local Histories ===
- The Early Coorgs as Mookonda Kushalappa, USA: Createspace, 2013. ISBN 9781494430115, India: NotionPress, 2013. ISBN 9789383808274
- Long Ago in Coorg as Mookonda Kushalappa, USA: Createspace, 2013. ISBN 9781494282479, India: Pothi books, 2014. ISBN 9788192914206
- 1785 Coorg as Mookonda Kushalappa, Kodagu: Codava Makkada Coota, 2018.
- Kodagu Principality vs British Empire as Mookonda Kushalappa, Kodagu: Codava Makkada Coota, 2018.

=== Biographies ===
- The Major who kept his Cool (Lt Col P S Ganapathi, MVC) as Mookonda Kushalappa, Kodagu: Codava Makkada Coota, 2019.

==== Translation ====
- The Gandhi of Kodagu (Pandyanda Belliappa) as Mookonda Nitin Kushalappa (Original Kodagina Gandhi was in Kannada, by Iythichanda Ramesh Uthappa), Kodagu: Codava Makkada Coota, 2020

=== Novellas ===
- The House of Awadh as Nitin Kushalappa M P, Gurugram: Bigfoot Publication, 2019. ISBN 9788194302445 (modern-day Ramayan)

==== Children's Novella ====
- A Hoysala Adventure as Nitin Kushalappa M P, New Delhi: Puffin, 2025. ISBN 9780143471882 (Historical fiction, Girls of India series)

=== Folk Tale Collections ===
- Folktales, Myths and Legends from the Deccan as Nitin Kushalappa, New Delhi: Rupa, 2026. ISBN 978-9376461677

==== Children's Folk Tale Collection ====
- Dakshin: South Indian Myths and Fables Retold as Nitin Kushalappa M P, New Delhi: Puffin, 2023. ISBN 9780143454991

=== Audiobooks ===
2024: Dakshin: South Indian Myths and Fables Retold (read by Rohini Vij), Random House Audio.

=== Columnist Articles ===
- Kushalappa, Mookonda. Deccan Herald. https://www.deccanherald.com/author/mookonda-kushalappa.
- Kushalappa, Mookonda. Star of Mysore. https://starofmysore.com/tag/mookonda-kushalappa/.
- Kushalappa, Mookonda Nitin. Star of Mysore. https://starofmysore.com/tag/mookonda-nitin-kushalappa/.
