= Nadikerianda Chinnappa =

Indian author

- Born: Kodagu (Coorg), India
- Died: Kodagu (Coorg), India
- Occupations: Police officer, author, cricket player, philanthropist
- Writing career
- Period: 1875–1931
- Genres: Folklore, poetry, translation

Nadikerianda Chinnappa (1875–1931) was an Indian compiler, poet, translator, army man, police officer, cricket player, singer and philanthropist from Kodagu.

== Origins ==
=== Ancestry ===
The Nadikerianda clan name originated from the words Nadu keri ('Central village') and the suffix anda which means 'belonging to'. Incidentally, Nadikeri is the name of a village in South Kodagu as well. According to a family tree drawn by Nadikerianda Chinnappa himself the earliest remembered ancestors of the clan were Nadikerianda Aiyanna and his wife Mayamma who lived around 1600 CE. This family tree was drawn up in 1918. The most notable legendary members of this clan were Nadikerianda Devayya and Kaaruvanna, the first was a folk ballad hero whose clan was responsible for the Malethirike shrine on top of the Somagiri peak, near the Nadikerianda ancestral house in Karada village. He was cursed by a powerful tantric. Kaaruvanna was his heroic brother who redeemed his spirit. They are considered to be the Kaarana or Kaarona (revered ancestors) of the clan.

=== Birth ===
Nadikerianda Chinnappa was born in 1875 in the village of Karada, Napoklu naad in Coorg (now Kodagu) to Kodava parents Nadikerianda Aiyanna (not to be mistaken for the early ancestor who had the same name) and Pattamada Ponnavva. They had eight children, four daughters and four sons; Chinnappa was the fifth-eldest, he had two elder sisters, two elder brothers (Subbayya and Kaalappa), two younger sisters and one younger brother. His mother was a lady of the Pattamada clan who knew horse-riding.

== Early life ==
=== Education ===
After matriculating in Mercara from the Central High School he did his F.A.(First Year Arts) from Mangalore. In college he was good at sports, especially in Hockey and Cricket, and in studies. He married his deceased brother Subbayya's widow, Nanjavva, in accordance to tradition, in Coorg and worked as a teacher in Mercara Central High School.

=== Career ===
In 1899 he joined the revenue department and became a Senebaayi (Shanbhog or Accountant). That year in September he wrote an English poem, 'My Position as Shanbog', voicing his frustration with his job. The following year he became a Revenue Inspector and in 1902 he joined the Coorg Regiment of the army and rose to become a Subedar-Major. When the regiment was disbanded in 1904 he joined the Police Department, underwent training in Vellore and became a sub-Inspector in Kushalnagar. Thereafter he served in Napoklu, Srimangala and Virajpet for some five or six years each until he was made Prosecuting sub-Inspector and posted in Madikeri. Later he became a Prosecuting Inspector in Coorg.

His job in the Police Force required him to travel on horseback to the villages nestled in the valleys and hills of Kodagu. While he went about his duties, he witnessed local festivals and listened to folk-songs that were a part of his culture and was fascinated by them. He feared that these traditions and songs that were handed down orally over the generations would in time be forgotten, because of the dominance of the English language, and influence of the cultures of the neighbouring areas. He got acquainted with several folk-singers and often, when he returned after his day's work, he brought them home on his horse. He asked his wife to feed them and having served them local toddy, he got them to sing the folk-songs they knew, as they beat the dudi (small, hand-held, hourglass-shaped Coorg drum), while he transcribed the words of the songs, late into the night. By the year 1922 he had compiled many folk-songs and gathered enough material on the customs and traditions of Kodavas for his book, which he called the Pattole Palame. He also collected nearly 750 Kodava idioms and proverbs for the book.

== Pattole Palame ==
=== Name ===
‘Pattole' is derived from patt-pole which means 'silk-like', and 'Palame' means 'lore' or 'stories'. Thus Pattole Palame stands for 'Silken Lore'. There is yet another interpretation of the title. In the olden days, family histories, rituals and other records were scripted on palm leaves by astrologers. These ancient, scripted leaves called Pattole (patt=silk, ole=palm leaf) or 'silken palm leaf' are still preserved in many Kodava Ainmanes (ancestral homes). Palame also referred to the hereditary oral tradition of folk songs and ballads among the Kodavas.

=== Reviews and publication ===
The Pattole Palame, a collection of Kodava folksongs and traditions compiled in the early 1900s by Nadikerianda Chinnappa, was first published in 1924. Some British officials who were interested in Indology(C. S. Sooter and C. Hilton Brown) encouraged Chinnappa in his effort and asked some prominent Kodavas – District Magistrate Rao Saheb (later Dewan Bahadur) Ketolira Chengappa, Retd. Mysore Councillor Rao Bahadur Kodanda Madayya and Retd. Assistant Commissioner Kodandera Kuttayya to review his draft book. When these reviewers commended the book, C.S.Sooter, the then Commissioner of Coorg, got the British Government to provide financial assistance to the author to publish it. Kullachanda Karumbayya was the proof examiner for the book.

=== Folksongs ===
Nearly two-thirds of the book consists of folksongs that were handed down orally through generations. Many of these songs are sung even today during marriage and death ceremonies, during Kodava festivals relating to the seasons and during festivals in honour of local deities and heroes. Traditionally known as Balo Pat, these songs are sung by four men who beat dudis (small, handheld, hourglass-shaped Coorg drums) as they sing. The songs have haunting melodies and evoke memories of times long past. Kodava folk dances are performed to the beat of many of these songs.

In the second edition of Pattole Palame (or 'Silken Lore'), published by the University of Mysore in 1975, the editor describes it as one of the earliest, if not the earliest, extensive collection of folklore of any Indian community written in an Indian language by an Indian. The fourth edition of the Pattole Palame was published in 2002 by the Karnataka Kodava Sahitya Academy.

== Bhagvathanda Patt ==
In 1929, Chinnappa's translation of the Bhagwat Gita into Kodava thakk, called Bhagvathanda Patt, got published. This was written in the style of the Balopattu (Palame songs) and in a simple manner which could be understood by common people as well.

== Sri Moola Kanniye ==
On 1 October 1917, Nadikerianda Chinnappa wrote a patriotic song in Kodava thakk Sri Moola Kanniye ('Primal Goddess'). He called this the Swadesha Priya Keerthana (literally 'Hymn of the love for self-rule') and the 'National Anthem'. This song is dedicated to the Goddess Kaveri, the patron of Kodagu and the Kodavas. One must note that this song was written in the pre-Independence age when the British Raj ruled over India and Indians were being stirred by the call for a sovereign nation ruled by themselves.

This song was included in the 'Introduction' of the original version of the Pattole Palame that was released in 1924, but was inadvertently omitted in the second and the third editions, that came out in 1975 and 1995. However, in the fourth (2002) and fifth (2006) editions these omissions were noticed by the grandchildren of Chinnappa, who had been abroad those many years, and hence subsequently included. Chinnappa's family members and relatives sing this song as their daily prayer.

=== Linguistic Survey ===
Between 1913 and 1920 Grierson began the first Linguistic Survey of India. He wanted knowledgeable representatives of various Indian languages to translate a biblical parable into their language and to either sing a song or to narrate a story from their language. Needless to say Nadikerianda Chinnappa, who was well-versed in both English and Kodava thakk (besides Kannada), was chosen as the representative of the Kodava language.(Biddappa:20 1996) In 1922, after narrating the Kodava thakk rendering of the biblical parable 'Prodigal son', he sang his own composition, the poem titled The Coorg national anthem: Swadēsi priya kirtane ('Patriot's hymn'). These gramophone recordings became part of the Linguistic Survey of India collection. (Ramachandrachar 7:1994)

A copy of these recordings were kept in the British Library's 'Sound Archives' in London and in the Madras Museum. This was digitised recently by the Linguistics Department of the University of Chicago Kodava thakk is called Kodaga and it is wrongly identified as being a language of the erstwhile Madras province. The archives don't credit Chinnappa, they simply state that the narrator is unknown. Upon hearing the recording in the Madras museum in the early 1970s, his son, Subbayya, who had known about the recording, recognised his father's voice. Chinnappa's grandson N. S. Nanjappa has since informed the concerned authorities in the University of Chicago about the name of the narrator.

== Renaissance Man ==
Nadikerianda Chinnappa was a renaissance man of his times. He was a compiler, poet, translator, army man, police officer, cricket player, historian, singer and philanthropist.

=== Poet ===
Although he was best known for his compilation work, the Pattole Palame, he wrote original work in three languages: Kodava thakk, Kannada and English. Chinnappa was also a well-known Kodava thakk poet, his most famous work being Bhagavanthanda Paat, the translation of the Bhagavad Gita into Kodava thakk in the folksong style. His popular poem Sri Moola Kanniye ('The Primal Goddess'), in Kodava thakk, is called the Kodava anthem. He also wrote a well-known poem in Kannada and it was titled Somagirija Deva, on the deity of the Nadikerianda clan, at the Malethirike shrine.

=== Sportsperson ===
He used to play different sports regularly at the Victoria Club in Virajpet. A very good bowler in the game of cricket, he was a member of the All Coorg XI cricket team. Beside being part of the Coorg XI cricket team and playing field hockey, he also played billiards and tennis at the Victoria Club. Many of the Europeans who frequented the club would mutter under their breathe upon losing to him. One day he lost his patience during a game of billiards and he broke the stick. This was seen as a very daring thing for a petty officer under the majesty's service to do before the European officers. (Ramachandrachar 11:1994)

=== Philanthropist ===
He was also involved in establishing the Coorg Central Bank and the Coorg Education Fund. As a philanthropist he sponsored the education of many poor and orphaned children in Kodagu. In fact, at any point of time during his employment in the Police Department there used to be around 8–10 students boarding in his Madikeri and Virajpet residences, free of cost. Chinnappa encouraged Boverianda Muthanna, a brilliant student from the neighbouring village of Nariandada, to pursue his higher education by applying to the Coorg Education Fund for financial support. Muttanna studied in Bangalore Central College where he earned a gold medal in English. He joined the College of Engineering, Guindy, in Madras province (now, in Chennai, Tamil Nadu). Later Chinnappa's daughter Gangamma married Muthanna. (Ramachandrachar 10:1994)

== Legacy ==
Nadikerianda Chinnappa and Appaneravanda Hardas Appachcha Kavi are the two important poets and writers of the Kodava language. These two pioneers were the earliest known to write Kodava thakk in the Kannada script. Nadikerianda Chinnappa is well known for his magnum opus the 'Pattole Palome', a compilation of the folk songs and hymns of the Kodavas. The Kodava language, called the Kodava thakk ('speech of the Kodavas'), is a tongue rather than a written language, spoken in Kodagu (earlier known as Coorg), a district of Karnataka State in South India. Formerly thought of as a Kannada dialect, it is now recognised as a separate Indian language of the Dravidian family. It has a very recent literature dating from the early 20th century.

The text of the Pattole Palame was in Kannada and the folksongs, proverbs etc., in it were in Kodava thakk, written using the Kannada script. Nadikerianda Chinnappa had begun translating the work into English in 1925 but he died in 1931, before he could complete it. This work is considered the main literature of the Kodava language. This book is also referred by the Kodava Hindus who seek to clarify ancient traditions. The 119th birth anniversary of Chinnappa was celebrated in 1994 jointly by the Karnataka Janapada (folk) association and the Yakshagana Academy. The Pattole Palame has become the chief text on Kodava customs and traditions for Kodavas.

== Family ==
Chinnappa had four sons and two daughters but among them his first three sons died, the surviving children were two daughters (Gangamma and Muthamma) and one son (Subbayya). He also had two step children, a boy and a girl (Aiyanna and Bojamma), the children of Nanjavva and his late elder brother Subbayya. Besides these five surviving children he also adopted his widowed sister Chinnavva's daughter Akkamma.

His son Subbayya (Mittu), who was a BEd trained teacher, was engaged to marry Neravanda Nanjappa's daughter Ponnamma, who was also a teacher. But before the marriage was to happen, Chinnappa died of cancer, aged 56, on 12 September 1931, only a few months after his retirement from the Police service. Subbayya also wrote poetry and drama. He became the Asst. Education Officer of Coorg, before retirement. He was responsible for starting many High Schools in Coorg. Nadikerianda Subbayya's daughter Nanjamma was married to Gangamma's son Bovverianda Chinnappa. N.S. Ponnappa, the famous cartoonist is Nadikerianda Chinnappa's youngest grandson – son of Subbayya and Ponnamma.

== Translation ==
In the 1970s, over almost three years, Boverianda Chinnappa, Nanjamma and Nanjamma's mother began to copy out in longhand the partially completed rough translation of the Pattole Palame done by Nadikerianda Chinnappa.[5] Nanjamma's parents assisted in translating and interpreting the text. After retirement from Canada in 1995, the Boverianda Chinnappas settled down in Bangalore and began to realise the author's cherished dream of translating the Pattole Palame into English.

While they were searching for copies of the original edition of the Pattole Palame, a ninety-year-old farmer and self-taught folk artist, Bacharaniyanda Annaiah, responded to their advertisement. During his youth unable to afford the book he had copied out the entire text word by word under the light of a kerosene lamp, after a hard day's work in the rice fields. He gave this notebook to the Boverianda Chinnappas. They also consulted many elders from Kodagu for the meanings of archaic words in the folk-songs and proverbs.

Finally in 2003, they completed the work and it has been published by Rupa & Co., New Delhi. That same year it was released in Madikeri (Mercara) and in Dakshinachitra, Chennai. N.S. Ponnappa did the cover painting for the book and illustrated it with beautiful line drawings.
