= Ainmanes =

Coordinates: 12°14′34.8″N 75°42′5.8″E

Kodagu: home of the Kodavas shown above in the map of Karnataka, India (in orange)

An ainmane is the ancestral house of a clan with roots in Kodagu.

== Etymology ==
The word ainmane comes from the term ayyangada mane - house of the elders.

== Culture ==
The people of Coorg settled in family groups called okka. It is a joint patrilineal clan with males of common ancestry who share an okka name. Presently there are more than 1000 okka names and families in Kodagu. Traditionally all the members of an okka lived in a large ancestral ainmane house. In the past, ainemane houses formed the focal meeting points in the rural landscape. This cluster of homes and property form the nucleus of village called Uur. The emergence of townships, as such, has been a relatively recent phenomenon.

The founder of each clan (Okka), the Guru Karana, is worshipped by the members of that particular clan. On their ancestral clan lands they have holy shrine (Kaimada), which is the shrine of the clan's first ancestor (Guru Karana), where they offer prayers and obeisance. A number of weapons, made of wood or metal, are kept in the Kaimadas. The shrine is usually made of clay or wood or covered with sheet metal, and housed within a roofed structure built near the entrance to the ainmane. Sometimes it is simply located on a platform under a sap-exuding tree near the entrance of ainemane.

Some clans conduct a karana kola, a dance of the ancestral spirit during which a Malayalee migrant dresses in elaborate colourful clothing and dances in a trance and acts as an oracle. During this ceremony he is symbolically possessed by the karana, the original founder of the particular clan. In every home a lamp called Thook Bolcha is lit in honour of the Guru Karana. The lamp in the central hall is lit by the embers of the kitchen hearth every day. Fire of the kitchen hearth is especially sacred.

On the day of Huttari (the rice harvest festival celebrated in around November–December), the whole family assembles in their ain mane (the common family house), which is decorated with flowers and green mango and banana leaves.

== The Ainmanes Project ==
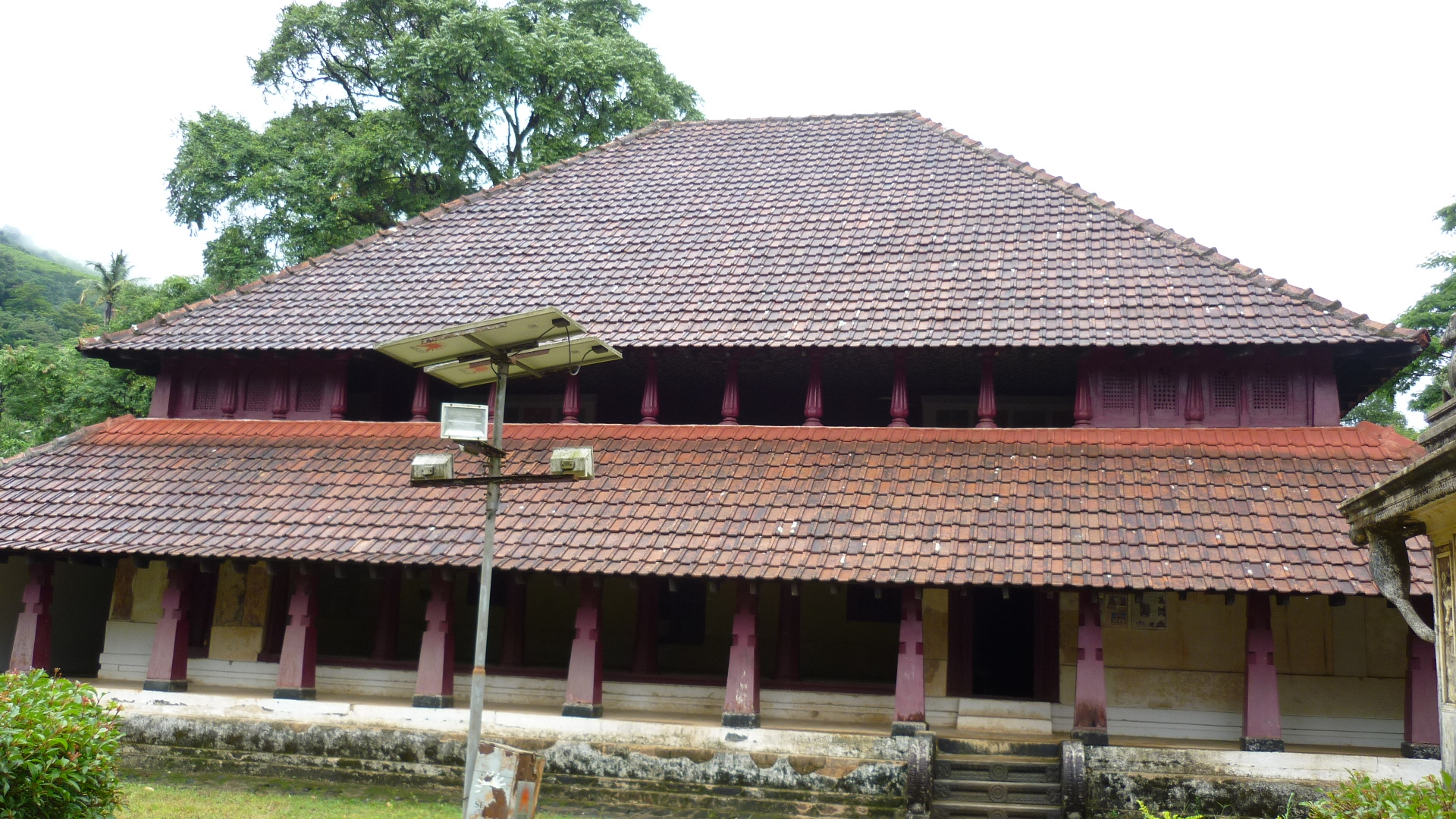
Nalnad Palace built in the style of an Ainmane

Boverianda Nanjamma and Chinnappa had undertaken a project to collect information regarding each and every Ainmane found in Kodagu, irrespective of the community or caste of the clan members residing in them. They visited many of them in the period between April 2003 and May 2008. They also collected oral legends and traditional information from the occupants of each of these functional Ainmanes. Along with this they also researched about the concerned clans from previously published written material, wherever possible. The information thus collected are now available on the Ainmanes website. They have also provided a glossary for the Kodava thakk words used in the site.

In 2014, Niyogi books has published their work titled 'Ainmanes of Kodagu'.
