= N. Ponnappa =

Cartoonist

Nala Ponnappa is a freelance cartoonist. His works have appeared in many major journals of India over the decades.

== Early life and education ==
Ponnappa is a Kodava (Coorg) born in Mangalore in 1948 as the son of Nadikerianda C 'Mittoo' Subbaiah and (nee Neravanda) Ponnamma, both school teachers. His paternal grandfather was Nadikerianda Chinnappa, the compiler of the Pattole Palame. Ponnappa's early education was in Mangalore, Pune, and Chennai. He graduated in architecture and went to Chicago for higher studies, where he first started drawing cartoons for his college magazine.

== Career ==
After a 11-year stint from 1970 to 1981 as an architect in Chennai where he worked for Geoffrey Bawa, and in Delhi, and Lagos, he switched to cartooning full time. In India his cartoons first appeared in India Today, in 1976.

== Awards ==
He has won awards for cartooning both in India and abroad. He was a member of the jury for an International Cartoon competition held in Germany on Humankind and Energy. He is the recipient of the Karnataka State Rajyotsava Award. He has won international recognition in cartoon competitions in various countries such as South Korea, Romania, Germany, and Japan. In 2006, he was awarded the title 'Coorg person of the year'.

== Personal life ==
He has held cartoon workshops in Bangalore where he stayed for long. He now resides in Goa with his wife Jyoti Shetty.
