= Kodava Sahitya Academy =

Organisation

Karnataka Kodava Sahitya Academy
- Abbreviation: KASA
- Formation: 1994; 32 years ago
- Headquarters: Madikeri, Kodagu
- Location: Madikeri, Virajpet, Mysore, Bangalore in India
- Region served: India
- President: Ajjinikanda Mahesh Nachaiah
- Parent organisation: Kannada and culture department, Government of Karnataka

The Kodava Sahitya Academy is an organisation under the Government of Karnataka which preserves and promotes the Kodava language, literature and culture.

== Foundation ==
The Karnataka Kodava Sahitya Academy was founded in 1994 when Veerappa Moily was the Chief Minister of Karnataka.

== Recent developments ==
Every year, the Kodava Sahitya Academy announces and confers awards upon Kodava speaking achievers in the fields of culture and language. The academy also publishes books in the Kodava language.

Since 2021, the Mangalore University now teaches an MA degree in the Kodava language.

== See also ==
- Kodagu
- Kodava language
- Kodava people
- Karnataka ethnic groups
