= Ethnic groups in Karnataka =

Overview of ethnic groups resident in Karnataka

Cowbells collected from various regions of Karnataka being played at Janapada Loka

Karnataka is a state in the southern part of India. It was created on 1 November 1956, with the passing of the States Reorganisation Act. Karnataka is bordered by the Arabian Sea to the west, Goa to the north-west, Maharashtra to the north, Telangana and Andhra Pradesh to the east, Tamil Nadu to the south-east, and Kerala to the south-west. The state covers an area of 74,122 sq mi (191,976 km^{2}), or 5.83% of the total geographical area of India. It comprises 30 districts. Kannada is the official language of Karnataka and as per the 2011 census is the mother tongue of 66.5% of the population. The state has around 50 spoken languages of which 8 are endangered and two are critically endangered.

Various ethnic groups with origins in other parts of India have unique customs and use languages at home other than Kannada, adding to the cultural diversity of the state. Significant linguistic minorities in the state in 2011 included speakers of Urdu (10.8%), Telugu (5.8%), Tamil (3.5%), Marathi (3.4%), Hindi (3.2%), Tulu (2.6%), Konkani (1.3%) and Malayalam (1.3%).

== Kannadigas ==
Kannadigas form the dominant ethnic group in Karnataka, making up to 67% of the total population of the state. They are the native speakers of the Kannada language. Kannada is one of the official languages of India and the official and administrative language of the state of Karnataka. Based on the recommendations of the Committee of Linguistic Experts, appointed by the Ministry of Culture, the Government of India officially recognised Kannada as a classical language.

== Tuluva people ==

Tuluvas are the native speakers of Tulu language. They form the dominant ethnic community in the district of Dakshina Kannada of Karnataka, which is often termed as a single region called as Tulu Nadu. Yakshagana, Nagaradhane, Bootha Kola and Aati kalenja are the distinctive features of Tuluva culture. Tuluvas follow a matrilineal system of inheritance known as Aliyasantana which has given them a unique cultural status. As per the 2011 census, Tuluvas formed 2.61% of the total population of the state.

== Konkani people ==
The speakers of Konkani language are widely settled in the districts of Uttara Kannada, Udupi and Dakshina Kannada (Udupi and Dakshina Kannada were the erstwhile South Canara district). In Karwar Taluk (Uttara Kannada district) alone, Konkani language is spoken by about 78% of the population. Significant population of Konkani people has also settled in Belgaum, Sirsi and Bangalore. As per the 2011 census, speakers of Konkani form 1.29% of the total population of the state.

The Gaud Saraswat Brahmins who migrated from Portuguese India, Konkani Muslims and Mangalorean Catholics are the major groups within Konkani speakers in the state. They are a major constituent of Karnataka based expatriates who live outside India and state.Different Konkani-speaking communities (like Saraswats, Catholics, etc.) have their own dialects. Even within the same town, speech can vary.

== Kodava people ==
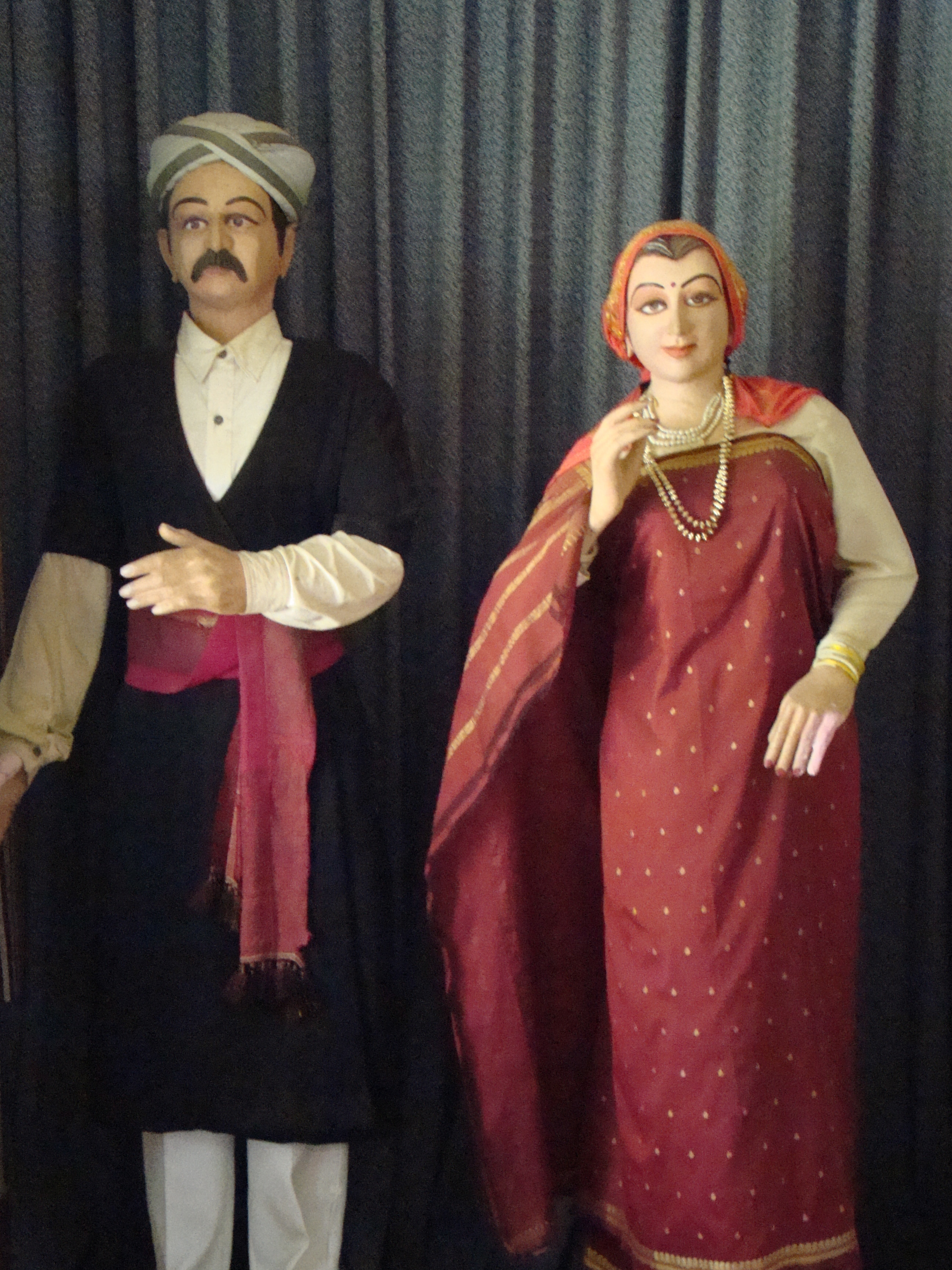
Dolls in Kodava attire

Kodava people are the native speakers of Kodava language and are of a martial race mainly settled in the district of Kodagu. As per the 2011 census, the speakers of Kodava Takk make up up to 0.18% of the total population of the state. According to Karnataka Kodava Sahitya Academy, apart from Kodavas, 18 other ethnic groups speak Kodava Takk in and outside the district including Heggade, Iri, Koyava, Banna, kudiya, Kembatti, and Meda.

First script for Kodava Thakk was found at Bhagamandala inscription dating back to 1370 AD. Later in the year 1887 Dr. Koravanda Appaiah invented a script for Kodava Thakk, Followed by Dr I.M.Muthanna in 1970, Kiran Subbaiah in 1980, Ponjanda Appaiah in 2003, Dr. Cox in 2005, Charles Henry in 2008.

A meeting which was held on 21 February 2022 by Karnataka Kodava Sahitya Academy at Madikeri officially accepted Dr. IM Muthanna's script as the official script of Kodava Thakk. Thus, ending the debate for the need of a script for Kodava Thakk. Muthanna's script is widely used among masses in Kodagu. Kodava Script is used by a number of individuals in Kodagu.

== Lambani language ==
The Lambani language is a Rajasthani language spoken by the Banjara community. Lambanis are associated with the salt trade. They are a major minority in Uttar Karnataka District, in Bidar, Kalburgi, Vijayapura, Gadag, Haveri, Koppal, Vijayanagara, Raichur and Yadgiri. They also form a major minority in South Karnataka, in Davangere, Shimoga, Chitradurga, Chikkamagaluru, Hassan and Tumkur.

== Deccani people ==
In Karnataka, Urdu is spoken in the form of Deccani, as in the other states of Deccan. People speaking Deccani as their mother tongue form the second largest ethnic group in Karnataka (10.83% of the total population as per the 2011 census), the majority of whom are Muslims (constituting 85.6% of the Muslim population in Karnataka in the 1991 census). Places in Karnataka like Gulbarga and Bijapur during the Sultanate period served as the centres of Deccani literature from 14th - 17th century. These literary activities led to the development of Urdu during the late Mughal period after the conquest of Bijapur in 1686 CE. The concentration of Deccani speakers shows an uneven distribution across different districts in Karnataka, with speakers mainly concentrated in the urban regions of Bangalore, Mysore, Bijapur, Gulbarga, and Bidar. They form a majority in the urban areas of Kolar and Ramanagara. Almost 57.5% of the total Deccani population in Karnataka are bilingual. Kannada and English are the most preferred second languages among Deccani speakers in Karnataka. About 43.5% of the total Deccani population is bilingual in Kannada.

== Marathi people ==
Marathi people are the native speakers of the Marathi language, which serves as the official language of the adjoining state of Maharashtra. Marathi speakers are mostly found in the districts of Belgaum and Bidar and as per the 2011 census form 3.38% of the total population of the state. The migration of Marathi speakers to Karnataka dates from the 17th century when the Maratha Empire was established. Belgaum city was incorporated into the newly formed Mysore state (now Karnataka) with the passage of the States Reorganisation Act (1956), which reorganised India's states along linguistic lines, despite having a significant Marathi-speaking population; two-thirds of the total population. There are also considerable number of Marathi-speakers in Bangalore city.

== Telugu people ==
Telugu people are the third largest ethnic group in Bengaluru after Kannadigas and Tamils, constituting 13.89% of the total population. The Telugu community is a prominent stakeholder in Real estate in Bengaluru especially the eastern IT areas of the city.

== Tamil people ==
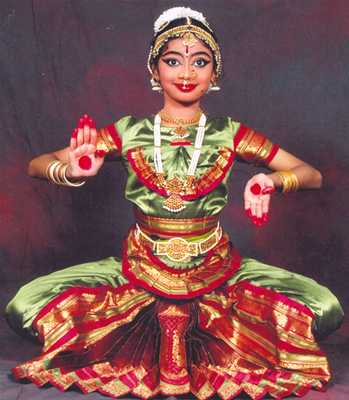
Bharatanatyam is a classical dance form of India which has its origin in south India, and it is immensely popular in Karnataka as well.

In Karnataka, Tamil speakers form 3.45% of the total population of the state. There has been a recorded presence of Tamil-speaking people in Southern Karnataka since the 10th century. During the eleventh century AD, the areas in and around Bangalore were a bone of contention between the Tamil-speaking Cholas and the Kannada-speaking Western Chalukyas. The Vaishnavite Brahmins of Southern Karnataka use the Tamil surname "Iyengar" and are believed to have migrated during the time of the 12th century Vaishnavite saint Ramanujacharya. Most Iyengars in Karnataka use sub-dialects of Iyengar Tamil.

After the fall of Tipu Sultan, a large British Army presence in the Cantonment area (Bangalore) attracted speakers of Tamil, who either were attached to the military or were military suppliers. The area was administered directly by the Madras Presidency, and was handed over to the Mysore State only in 1949. Today, the erstwhile Cantonment area of Bangalore comprising Ulsoor, Shivajinagar, Benson Town, Richard's Town, Frazer Town, Austin Town, Richmond Town, Cox Town, Murphy Town and others still boast a large Tamil populace. The boom in the textile industry in the early part of 20th Century also witnessed migration from the Madras Presidency. Some of the very well known mills of the time employed Tamil-speaking people in large numbers, who settled down in areas in and around Bangalore

In 2011, Tamils constituted the second largest ethnolinguistic minority in Bangalore city making up 13.90% of the total population. Today, Tamil speakers form an estimated 13.99% of the population of Bangalore city. As of 1971, Tamil formed the second-largest mother tongue in Bangalore and Bhadravathi, third in Mysore and Shimoga, fourth in Davanagere and fifth in Mangalore.

There are also Tamil families from Sri Lanka who were originally of South Indian Tamil descent, settled in Sulya and Puttur taluks of Dakshina Kannada district and are currently working in rubber plantations in the district.

== Malayali people ==
Malayalis are the native speakers of the Malayalam language, which has official status in the state of Kerala, and the union territories of Lakshadweep and Puducherry.

As per the 2011 census, Malayalis form 1.27% of the total population of the state Native Malayalam-speaking people are found in large numbers in the districts of Dakshina Kannada, Mysore, Udupi and Kodagu. In the early part of the 20th century, a large number of traders from the Malabar region settled in Bangalore for business reasons. It is also evident that Kodagu-Malabar association is ancient by the fact that people of Kodagu worshipped gods and goddesses common to the Malabari Malayali people. The Billava community of Kanara has close links with Thiyyas of Malabar Coast and they both revere Narayana Guru. In addition to Malayalam/Beary speaking Billava, there is also a similar community called Belchada who speaks a dialect of Malayalam called Malame.

== Others ==
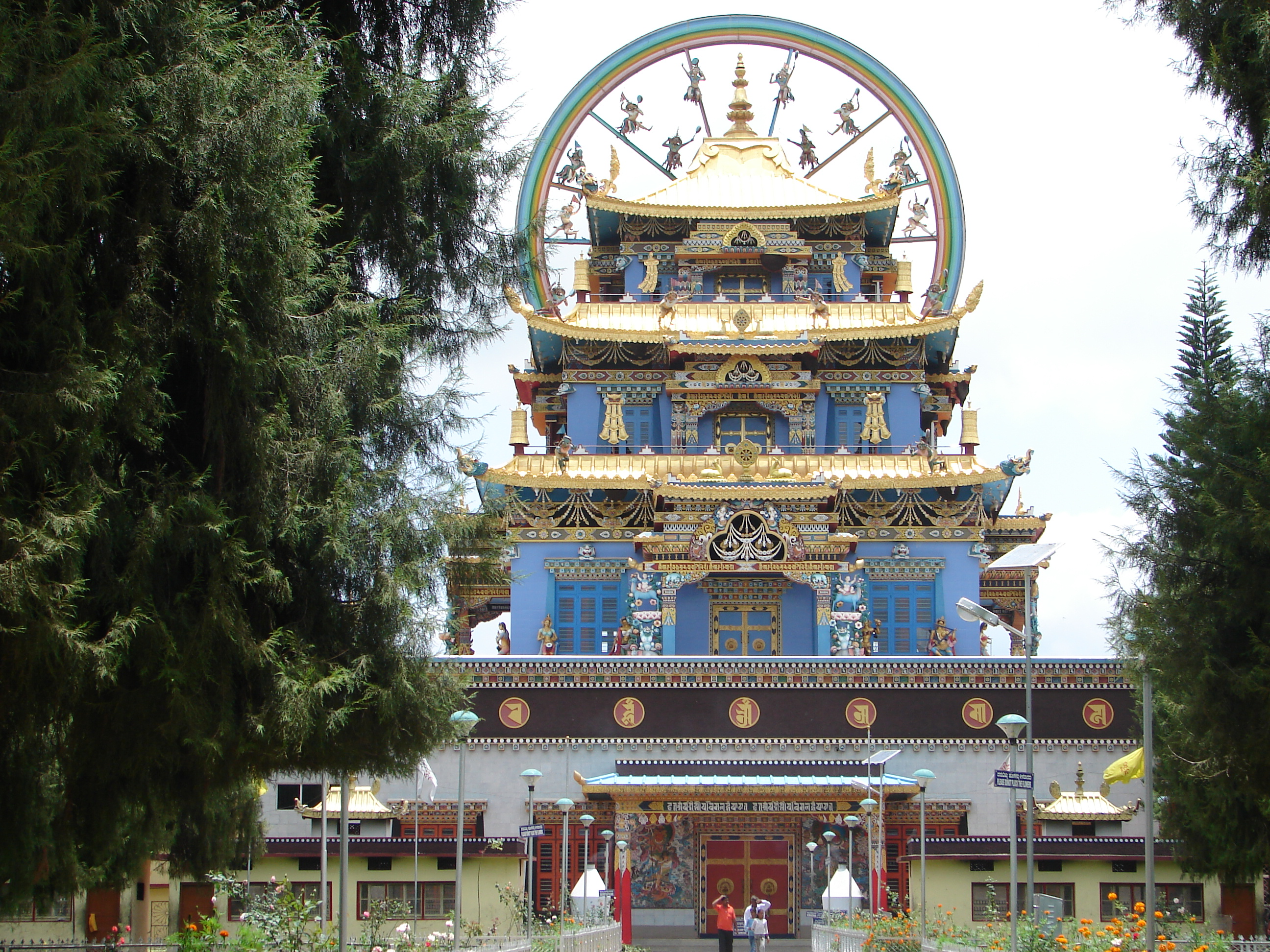
Entrance to golden temple, Bylakuppe

Other ethnic groups settled in Karnataka include Gujaratis (0.19%), Bengalis (0.14%), Odias (0.10%), Tibetans (0.06%), Punjabis (0.04%), Nepalis (0.03%) and Sindhis (0.03%).

Another minor ethnic group are the Bearys, who follow Islam and are mainly settled in the coastal districts of Dakshina Kannada and Udupi. They are the native speakers of Beary bashe, a language made of Malayalam idioms with Tulu phonology and grammar. This dialect was traditionally known as Mappila Malayalam because of Bearys' close contact with Mappilas. Due to vast influence of Tulu for centuries, it is today considered as a language, close to both Malayalam and Tulu. The word Beary is said to be derived from the Tulu word byara which means trade or business, as this community were primarily traders. Since the major portion of this community people were involved in business activities, the local Tulu-speaking majority called them Beary or Byari.

There is a small Tibetan settlement in Bylakuppe, in Mysore district. This was the first and largest of the intentional Tibetan settlements in India, and was created in response to accommodate fleeing Tibetans due to the Chinese occupation of their homeland. The camp is home to some 14,000 Tibetans.

The Nawayath Muslims in Bhatkal is another linguistic group in state. They are a sub group within Konkani Muslims.

The Sankethi language spoken by Sankethi Brahmins migrated from Sengottai to Southern Karnataka are another prominent group.

The Siddis are found in the ghat area of Uttara Kannada district, Dharwad district and Belgaum district. These people have African ancestry, as a majority of these people were said to have come from Goa, where they were imported from East Africa (mainly Mozambique) by the Portuguese as slaves. They speak Are Marathi, a mixture of Marathi with the Konkani and Kannada languages.

The state has numerous tribal and endangered ethno linguistic groups such as Yerava, Hakkipikki, Irula, Koraga, Soliga, Jenu Kuruba etc.
