= Thirke =

Writing script for a South Indian language

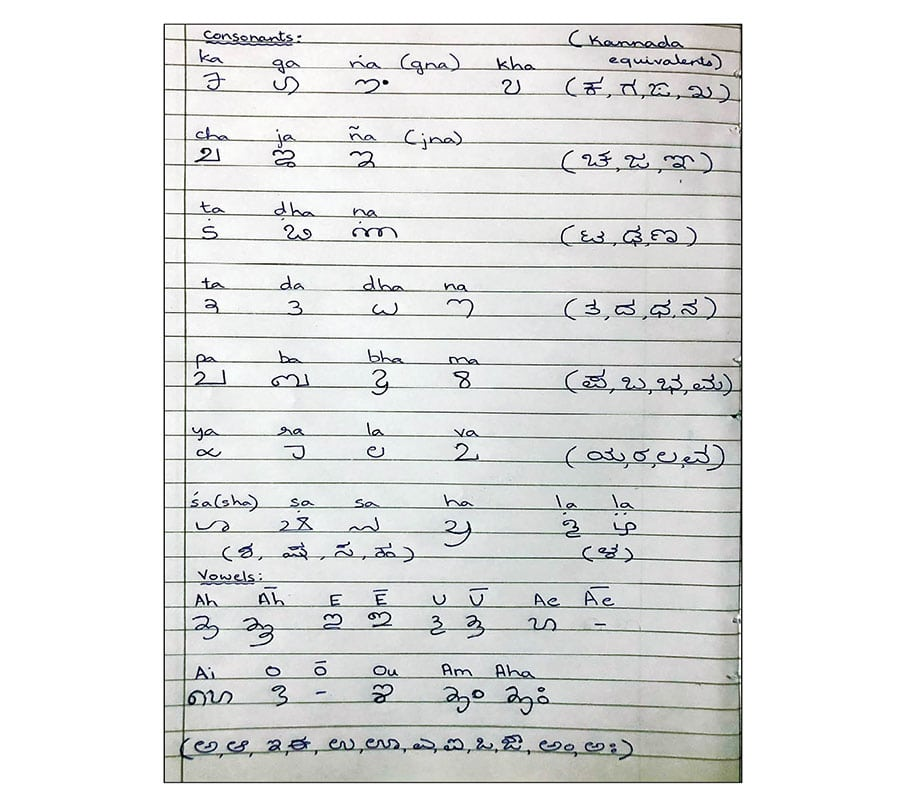
- Letters found in a 14th century Kodagu temple inscription
- Script type: Abugida
- Period: 14th century
- Direction: Left-to-right
- Region: India
- Language: Kodava

Related scripts
- Parent systems: Egyptian hieroglyphs: Proto-Sinaitic (Note: A Semitic origin for the Brāhmī script is not universally accepted.); Phoenician; Aramaic; Brāhmī; Tamil Brahmi; Pallava; Grantha; Thirke
- Sister systems: Malayalam script Tigalari script

Thirke is a left-to-right abugida (a type of segmental writing system), based on the ancient Brāhmī script. It was developed and in use during the 14th century CE in Kodagu, in present-day Karnataka.

== Etymology ==
Mookonda Kushalappa called this script "thirke" ("temple" in Kodava). Kodava is the language native to Kodagu.

== History ==
Two inscriptions dating to 1370-1371 AD with the thirke script were found in the Bhagandeshwara temple in Bhagamandala and the Palurappa Mahalingeshwara temple in Palur.

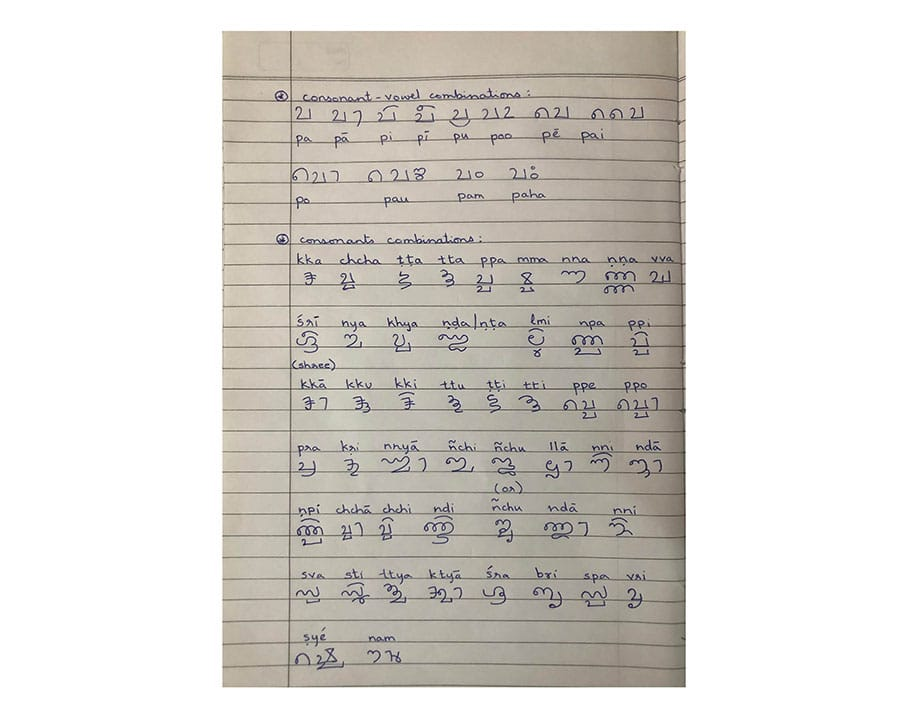
Letter combinations found in a 14th century Kodagu temple inscription

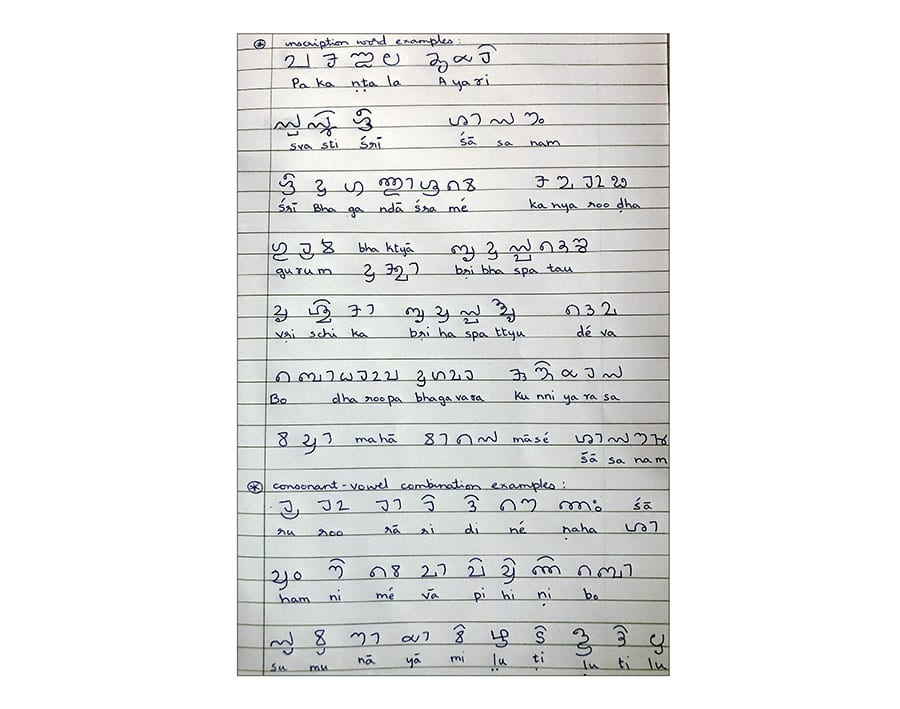
Words found in the 14th century Kodagu inscription (c.1370-1371)

== Decipherment ==
The inscriptions have been attributed to a King Bodharupa. The Coorg Inscriptions volume of the Epigraphia Carnatica mentioned these two 14th-century inscriptions. Authored by B. L. Rice in 1914, the two inscriptions were deciphered for him by Narasimhachar and Krishna Shastri. They did not believe the inscriptions to be a unique language. Narasimhachar said that the "characters are a jumble of Grantha, Malayalam, Tamil and a few Vatteluttu. There is no doubt about portions being in Tamil, but other portions are in a language that is neither Malayalam nor Tulu but is related to them. I think the inscriptions are older than 1400 AD. Some of the characters appear to go back to the 11th century."

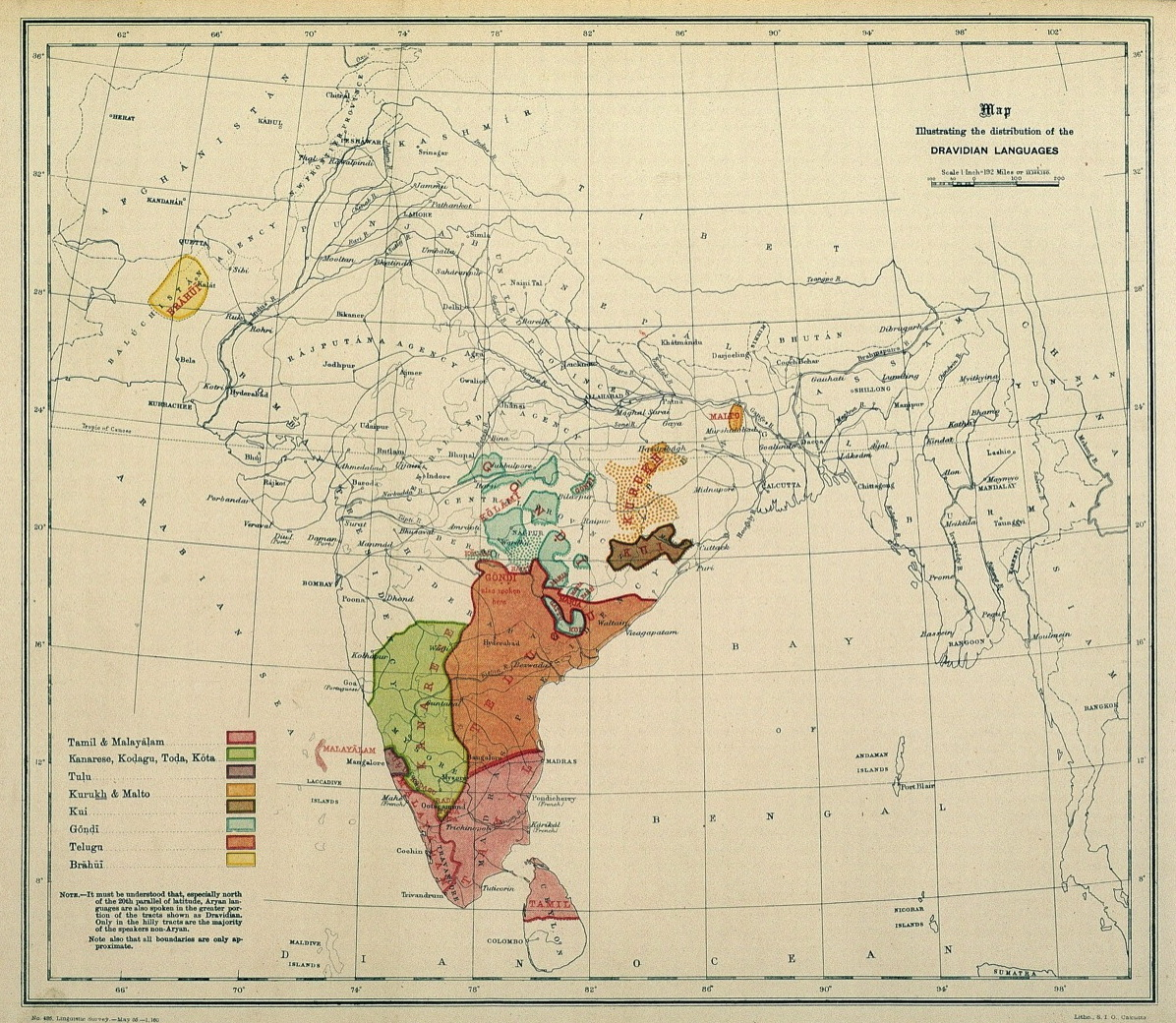
Linguistic Survey of India (1906) map of the distribution of Dravidian languages

== Discovery ==
Mookonda Nitin Kushalappa separated the characters used in the two inscriptions and put together the alphabet used.

== Sources ==
- Salomon, Richard (1996). "Brahmi and Kharoshthi". In Daniels, Peter T.; Bright, William (eds.). The World's Writing Systems. Oxford University Press. ISBN 0-19-507993-0.
