= Coorgi–Cox alphabet =

Dravidian writing system

Coorgi-Cox alphabet
- 'Coorgi-Cox' in Coorgi-Cox alphabet
- Script type: Alphabet
- Direction: Left-to-right
- Language: Kodava

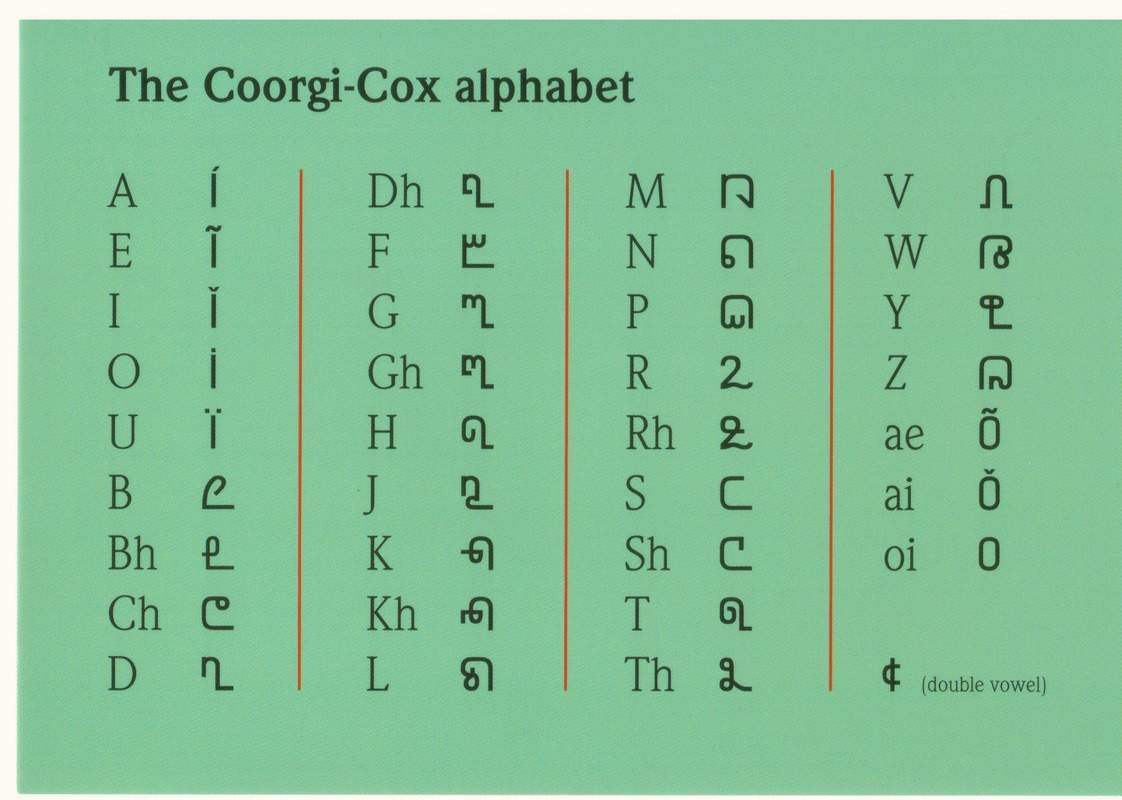
Coorgi–Cox alphabet

The Coorgi–Cox alphabet is an alphabet developed by the linguist Gregg M. Cox that is used by a number of individuals within Kodagu district of India to write the endangered Dravidian language of Kodava, also known sometimes as Coorgi.

The script uses a combination of 26 consonant letters, eight vowel letters and a diphthong marker. Each letter represents a single sound and there are no capital letters. A computer-based font has been created.

The script was developed out of the request by a group of Kodava individuals to have a distinct script for Kodava Takk, to distinguish the language. Kodava Takk is generally written in the Kannada script, but can also be found written in the Malayalam script, especially along the borders with Kerala. The new script is intended as a unified writing system for all Kodava Takk speakers.

In order to introduce the script, 10,000 CD booklets and 25,000 post cards with various scenes from the region were produced and distributed throughout the Coorg area in March and April 2005. Several books are being planned including a phrase book and dictionary.

== Unicode ==
The Coorgi-Cox alphabet was proposed to Unicode in 2012, and as of 2021 it was tagged as a "Script Proposal in Progress".

== Links ==
Handbook on Archive.org
