= Folktales, Myths and Legends from the Deccan =

11 folk narratives from South India

- Author: Nitin Kushalappa
- Language: English
- Publisher: Rupa Books
- Publication date: 05 March 2026
- Publication place: India
- Pages: 184
- ISBN: 978-93-7646-167-7

Folktales, Myths and Legends from the Deccan is an anthology of eleven folk narratives, ten tales and one essay, from Bayaluseeme (Karnataka's semi-arid tableland), Kodagu, Tulunad (coastal South Karnataka), Kongu Nadu (Northeast Tamil Nadu), coastal Kerala, Rayalaseema, coastal Andhra, Telangana and other regions of the Deccan and South India. The narratives are derived from oral storytelling traditions and span various regions and languages.

This collection narrates oral traditions of local heroes, folk deities, warrior-sorcerers, goddesses, wandering philosophers and forbidden love. They speak of local deities, folk heroes, and forbidden love, all of which are spoken of in the semi-arid and forested parts of the peninsular plateau, the adjacent hilly ghatlands, and the coastal plains.

== Chapters ==
Some of the popular chapters are:

1. The Epic of Junjappa from Bayaluseeme, Karnataka,
2. The Legend of Kalyat Ponnappa, set in Kodagu (Coorg), Karnataka,
3. Koti and Chennaya from coastal Tulunād, Karnataka,
4. The Ballad of Lorik and Chandaini, from Chhattisgarh,
5. The Myth of Twelve Abandoned Children from Kerala,
6. Yogi Vemana from Andhra Pradesh and Telangana,
7. The Seven Mother-Goddesses (Saptamatrikas).

== Reception ==
The collection has legends, myths, and folktales from across South India. The tales narrated in the chapters are from the Hindi, Kannada, Tamil, Telugu, Tulu, Kodava, Badaga and Malayalam languages.

Kriti Kambiri writes in the Hindustan Times that "Some of the tales emerge from this interplay between the spiritual and the human. The story of Junjappa, a humble cattle herder who returns as a revered spirit after an unjust death, lingers long after it ends. The tale of the Saptamatrkah, the seven mother goddesses believed to protect communities from famine, disease, and calamity, captures the deeply rooted goddess traditions of the Deccan with striking clarity. Equally compelling is the narrative around Yogi Vemana, whose transformation from indulgence to enlightenment gives the collection one of its more introspective moments."
