= Dakshin: South Indian Myths and Fables Retold =

15 folktales from South India

- Author: Nitin Kushalappa
- Language: English
- Publisher: Puffin India
- Publication date: 13 February 2023
- Publication place: India
- Pages: 252
- ISBN: 0-143-45499-4

Dakshin: South Indian Myths and Fables Retold is a collection of 15 folktales from South India. Authored by Nitin Kushalappa and illustrated by Pari Satarkar (artwork and cover illustration) and Isha Nagar (cover design), It was published by Puffin India (a subdivision of Penguin Random House) in 2023. The book features tales of sorcerers, gods, goddesses, fairies, animals, village folk, hunters, kings, and queens. The folk tales are based on diverse sources, drawn from books, songs sung at local temples, verses from regional languages, retellings of popular folklore, movies, and even comic books. This work of fiction is primarily meant for children and young adults.

== Stories ==
1. The Tale of the Mynah who never gave up
2. The Tale of Bala Nagamma and the Evil Sorcerer
3. The Giant Red Kangaroo, the Queen and the Hunter
4. The Tale of the Singing Drum
5. The Blessings of Vishnu
6. The Cat and the Fly's Delicious Congee
7. The Cow and the Tiger
8. The Seven Fairy Princesses
9. The Tale of the Last Sun
10. The Tale of the Miser
11. The Tale of the Jungle River
12. The Tale of the Boy Champion
13. The Tale of the Good Boy
14. The Moon Prince
15. The Sage and the River

== Reception ==
Sammohinee Ghosh of Mid-day, a Mumbai daily, states that "Kushalappa’s writing strikes the reader through its detailed and in-depth research."

Shweta Sharan of the Mint, a New Delhi-based publication under HT Media, states, "Keen to retell and document fables and myths from India, Nitin Kushalappa MP has collected 15 fantastic folk tales from South India in his latest book, 'Dakshin: South Indian Myths and Fables Retold'. Published by Puffin (an imprint of Penguin Random House India), the book is filled with tales of evil sorcerers, gods, goddesses, fairies, animals, village folk, hunters, kings, and queens."

Author C P Belliappa writes in Star of Mysore, "In retelling these stories, Nitin has given them a new flavour with his distinctive writing style... Each of the stories takes the reader on a whirlwind of fantasy. By the time the story peaks the reader is drawn into the vortex of the tale wondering what comes next. Every story invariably has an unexpected ending. And every story has a moral. The book is targeted at children nine years and older. It’s a collection that can be enjoyed by young adults, adults, and senior citizens as well... The book is on its way to becoming a classic. "

Md. Faizan Moquim wrote about the book in The Book Review in November 2023. He says that, "Kushalappa’s skillful narration keeps the reader anticipating the next twist and provides ample occasion to relish the world of folklore. The author, however, does not attempt to tease out differences between fables, myths, and folktales. A note toward this end in the introduction would have added clarity to these seemingly interchangeable terms for the young readers... Kushalappa’s retelling is certainly bound to inspire readers to find new horizons of meaning."

== Awards ==
Dakshin was shortlisted for the 2023 Atta Galatta-Bangalore Literature Festival Book Prize in the children's fiction category. In 2025, this book got its author the Sahitya Akademi's Bal Sahitya Puraskar, India's highest national award for children's literature.
