= CMR Institute of Technology =

Engineering college in Bangalore, India

- Type: Private
- Established: 2000
- Parent institution: CMR Group of Institutions
- Accreditation: NAAC with A++, NBA and AICTE
- Academic affiliations: Visvesvaraya Technological University (VTU), Belagavi
- Chairman: Dr. K C Ramamurthy
- President: Dr. Sabitha Ramamurthy
- Principal: Sanjay Jain
- Location: #132, AECS Layout, ITPL Main Rd, Bengaluru, Karnataka, 560037, India; 12.9666°N 77.7118°E
- Campus: 8 acres; Urban
- Website: cmrit.ac.in

CMR Institute of Technology (CMRIT) is a private engineering college located in Bengaluru, India. CMRIT is a technical and management institution affiliated to Visvesvaraya Technological University and approved by All India Council for Technical Education (AICTE), New Delhi. CMRIT is recognized by Government of Karnataka. Modes of Admission are KCET (UGCET) conducted by the KEA and COMED-K.

== Accreditations ==
CMRIT is accredited with A++ by the National Assessment and Accreditation Council (NAAC). All under-graduate engineering programs are accredited by the National Board of Accreditation (NBA).

- Affiliated to Visvesvaraya Technological University
- Approved by AICTE, New Delhi
- Recognised by Government of Karnataka
- Accredited by NBA (CSE, ECE, EEE)
- UGC Recognition under 2(f) & 12(B)
- Accredited by NAAC with A++
- Accredited by NBA (CV, ISE, ME)

== History ==
CMRIT was founded in 2000 by CMR Jnanadhara Trust. It offers courses like Bachelor of Engineering (BE), Master's degree, MCA, MBA and Doctoral programs. The CMR Jnanadhara Trust supports and manages all the activities of the CMR Group of Institutions.

== CMR Group of Institutions ==
- CMR Institute of Technology
- CMR University
- CMR National Public School
- CMR National P.U. College - HRBR
- CMR National P.U. College - ITPL
- CMR Centre for Business Studies
- CMR Life Skills Institute
- NPS International School, Singapore
- Ekya School JP Nagar
- Ekya School ITPL
- Ekya School BTM Layout
- Ekya School Kanakpura Road
- Ekya School Byrathi

== Courses offered ==
UG Courses

- Computer Science Engineering (CSE)
- Information Science Engineering (ISE)
- Computer Science Engineering (AIML)
- Computer Science Engineering (DS)
- Artificial Intelligence & Machine Learning (AIML)
- Artificial Intelligence & Data Science (AIDS)
- Electronics and Communication Engineering (ECE)
- EEE, ME, CE (Discontinued)

PG Courses

- Master of Business Administration (MBA)
- Master of Computer Applications (MCA)

Doctoral Programmes

- Ph.D. Engineering
- Ph.D. Sciences
- Ph.D. Computer Applications
- Ph.D. Business Administration

== Research ==
The various centre of Excellence of CMRIT

- CoE-Machine Intelligence and Big Data
- CoE-Data Driven Internet-of Things
- CoE-Integrated Circuits
- CoE-Signal Processing
- CoE-Additive Manufacturing
- CoE-Sensors and Nano Electronics
- CoE-Material Science
- CoE-Natural Resource Management
- CoE-Metallurgical Engineering
- CoE–Intelligent Energy Systems
- CoE–Intelligent Human Computer Interaction
- CoE–Robotic Systems
- CoE–Financial Markets
- CoE–Embedded System
- CoE-Modeling of Dynamical Systems
- CoE- Video Analytics

== Makerspace ==
- Makerspace@CMRIT is interdisciplinary, collaborative, community-oriented space equipped with latest prototyping equipment and technologies. The purpose of the Makerspace is to enable a hands-on culture where the CMRIT community utilizes theoretical skills and classroom knowledge from a wide range of content areas and experiences in real world projects.

== Notable alumni ==
- Varun Agarwal, Indian film maker
- Nivedhitha, Indian actress
- Nitin Kushalappa, Indian author
- Amit Singh (Founder/CEO, AI studio)
- Vigneshwaar Srinivasan (Product Leader)
