= Pattole Palome =

Compilation of Kodava folksongs

The Pattole Palame is a compilation of Kodava folksongs first published in 1924. It was compiled by Nadikerianda Chinnappa.

Kodagu: home of the Kodavas shown above in the map of Karnataka, India (in orange)

== Contents ==
The book is of 556 pages and divided into six sections. The first is called the Kodagu vivarane (Description of Kodagu) and consists of the first 76 pages. It speaks mainly of Kodagu's history, mythical and political, and geography. The second section (pages 73–202) is called Kodavara paddathi (Kodava customs) which speak of the ceremonies in the life of a Kodava from birth until death. Habbagalu (pages 203-298) is the name of the third section and it speaks of the Kodava festivals. The fourth section Devatheyada Pattu, gods' songs, from pages 269-403, consists of the songs of the village gods and goddesses. Goddess Kaveri, Seven Gods, Five Gods, Three Gods, Two Gods, Sarthavu (Aiyappa), Ketrappa (Kshetrapala), Pudiyodi (Bhagwathi) and others were the gods to whom these songs were dedicated. Keli Ponada Pattu (Songs of the well-known) forms the fifth section, pages from 404 to 502. It consists of ballads dedicated to Kanniyada Kamayya (also known as a folk song of Seven goddesses), Kaliatanda Ponnappa, Nadikerianda Devayya, Keyyondira Appayya, Aiyakovira Appayya and Poledevira Appayya, who were folk heroes of Kodagu. Naana Tharada Vishayagalu, from pages 503 to 556, forms the last section which consists of mainly sayings, proverbs and other matters.

== Author ==
Nadikerianda Chinnappa and Appaneravanda Hardas Appachcha Kavi are the two important poets and writers of the Kodava language. Nadikerianda Chinnappa (1875–1931) was a Kodava Police Inspector in Coorg. He spent his leisure in travelling on horseback through the hills of Coorg. He got acquainted with several folk singers and thereafter he began to compile folk songs. Some prominent Kodavas reviewed his compilation (the Pattole Palome). In 1929 Chinnappa's translation of the Bhagwat Gita into Kodava thakk, called Bhagvathanda Patt got published. Chinnappa was also a well-known Kodava thakk poet.

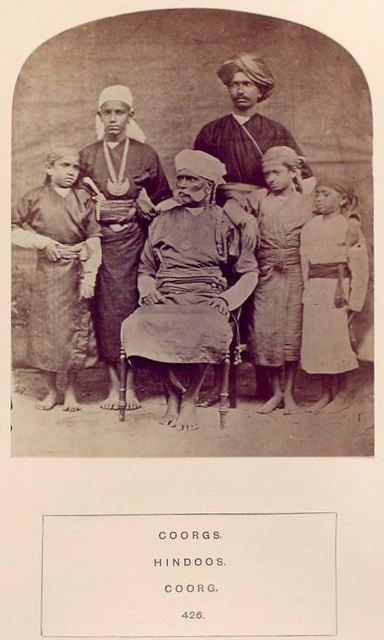
Kodava (Coorg) old man, with son and grandsons in 1875, by J. Forbes Watson (from NY public library)

== Modern usage ==
In the past, the village elders knew the traditional laws by heart and passed it on orally over the generations. In recent times the Pattole Palame has acted as a reference for Kodavas who sought the ancient law. One known example was when a couple had to be divorced. The law court referred to the Pattole Palame where they read about the 'Kallu-mara Kaipa' tradition and decided to have them separated (Biddappa 1996: viii). The elders of Kodava couples who marry outside Kodagu or even abroad refer to the Pattole Palame in order to follow the customs faithfully.

== Translation ==
Nadikerianda Chinnappa's grandchildren Boverianda Nanjamma and Chinnappa translated the Pattole Palame into English. They say that "It was when my parents visited us in Chennai in the 1960s that we learnt of how our grandfather had begun translating the work into English in 1925. But he died in 1931 before he could complete it. That is when both of us vowed to complete his translation one day".
