= Boverianda Nanjamma and Chinnappa =

- Born: India
- Occupations: Chinnappa: Engineer/Writer; Nanjamma: Statistician/Writer
- Writing career
- Notable works: Pattole Palame; The Ainmanes Project

Boverianda Nanjamma and Chinnappa were translators and scholars of Kodava studies. Their Pattole Palame was written using the Kannada script originally. It has been translated into English by Boverianda Nanjamma and Chinnappa and has been published by Rupa & Co., New Delhi.

== Early life ==
Boverianda Nanjamma and Chinnappa are the grandchildren of Nadikerianda Chinnappa, the compiler of the Pattole Palame. Nadikerianda Chinnappa's daughter Gangamma married Muthanna who was an engineer and from the Boverianda clan. Chinnappa's son Subbayya and daughter-in-law were both teachers. Their daughter Nanjamma was married to her cross-cousin, the son of Gangamma (Chinnappa's daughter), who had also been named Chinnappa.

== Careers ==
They both pursued their professions at Chennai, Kolkata and Canada. Nanjamma was a visiting fellow at Cambridge University in 1974. She has also co-authored a book on Business Survey Methods. In 1993 she was elected as a Fellow of the American Statistical Association. In 2006 she was given an honorary doctorate degree (D. Litt.) of the Mangalore University by T. N. Chaturvedi, the Governor of Karnataka.

== Pattole Palame in English ==
After retirement the couple settled down in Bangalore in 1995 and began to realise their grandfather's cherished dream. Finally in 2003, they completed the work and it has been published by Rupa & Co., New Delhi. That same year it was released in Madikeri (Mercara). This book has become the chief text for the Coorgs.

== Other works ==
They have been working on the ainemane project, this can be found on the Ainmanes website.

== Ainmanes Project ==
=== Ainmanes.com (website) ===
Boverianda Nanjamma and Chinnappa had undertaken a project to collect information regarding each and every Ainmane found in Kodagu, irrespective of the community or caste of the clan members residing in them. They visited many of them in the period between April 2003 and May 2008. They also collected oral legends and traditional information from the occupants of each of these functional Ainemanes. Along with this they have researched about the concerned clans from previously published written material, wherever possible. The information thus collected are now available on the Ainmanes website.

=== Ainmanes of Kodagu (book) ===
In 2014, Niyogi books has published their work titled Ainmanes of Kodagu.

== Deaths ==
Boverianda Chinnappa passed away on March 10, 2023, aged 89, in Mysore. His wife, Nanjamma, passed away nearly a year later on Sunday, March 31, 2024, also aged 89, in Mysore.
