= I. M. Muthanna =

Indian writer, scholar, and translator

Dr. I. M. Muthanna was a noted Indian writer, scholar and translator; he wrote in English, Kannada and Kodava takk and studied history, folklore and international studies. He was born in Kodagu into the Kodava (Coorg) community. He spent much of his later life in Canada. He is also responsible to developing the Muthanna script for Kodava Takk that has been accepted as the official script of the language by the Government of Karnataka.

== Work ==
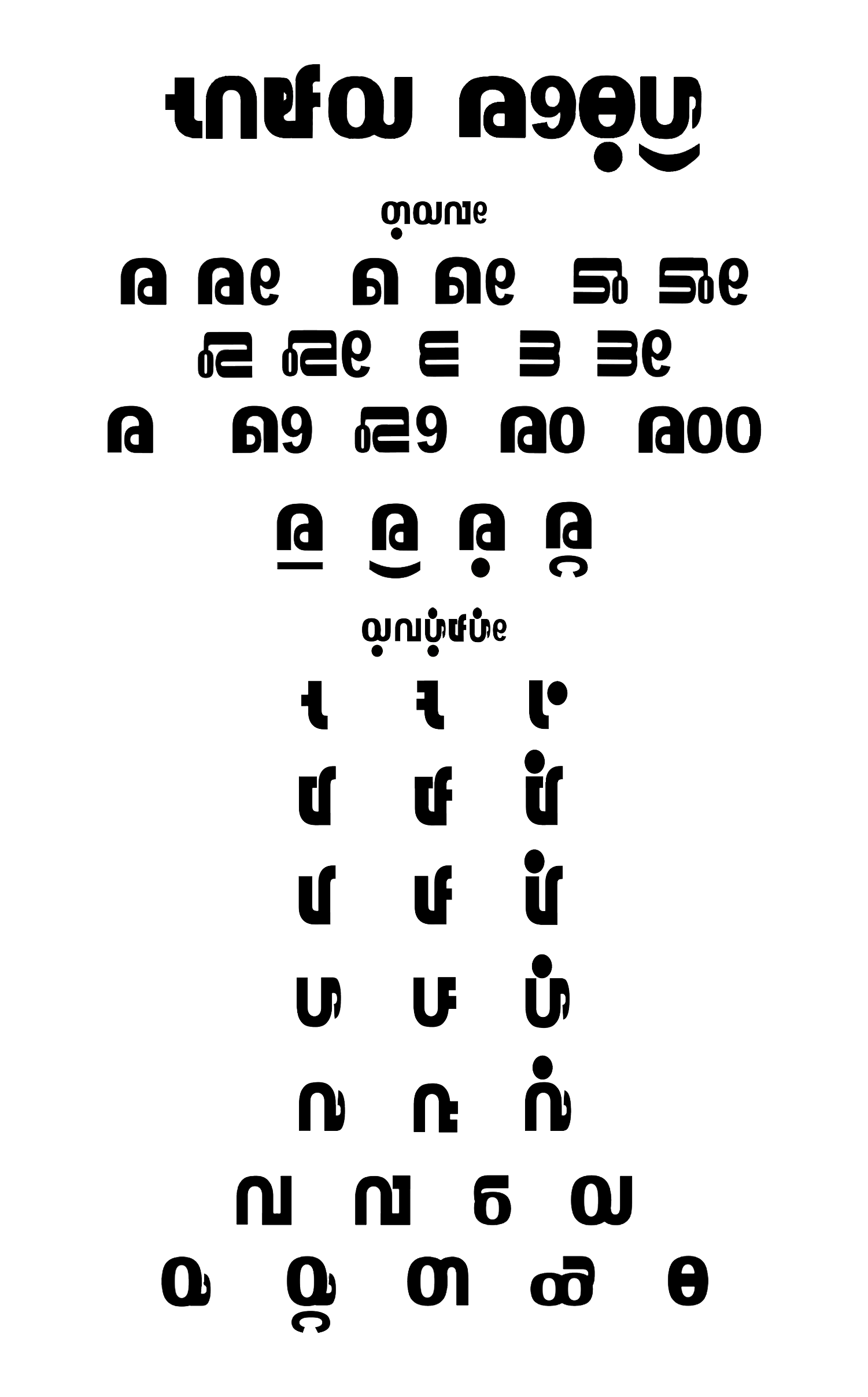
The script based on the one Muthanna developed. The official script for the Kodava language.

Some of the books that he wrote are listed below:

- A tiny model state of South India (in 1953)
- Indo-Ethiopian relations for centuries (in 1961)
- Muttaṇṇana kavanagaḷu (Kannada anthology in 1962)
- History of Karnataka: history, administration & culture (in 1962)
- General Cariappa: (the first Indian commander-in-chief) (in 1964)
- The Coorg memoirs (the story of the Kodavas): Muthanna speaks out (in 1971),
- General Thimmayya (former: Chief of Army Staff, India; Chairman, N.N.R.C., Korea; Commander, U.N. Forces, Cyprus) (in 1972),
- People of India in North America (part one) (in 1975),
- Karnataka, history, administration & culture (in 1977)
- Tipu Sultan x'rayed (in 1980),
- People of India in North America (United States, Canada, W. Indies, & Fiji): immigration history of East-Indians up to 1960 (in 1982),
- Koḍava Kannaḍa nighaṇṭu : Koḍava takk nighaṇṭ (Kodava-Kannada dictionary in 1983),
- Mother Besant and Mahatma Gandhi (in 1986),
- Kodavas & their gala "lela": Kodava folklores & songs (in 1987)

== Main sources ==
1. Jagathigonde Kodagu, by K P Muththanna, 1969.
2. Kodavas, by B D Ganapathy, 1980.
3. A study of the Origin of Coorgs, by Lt Col K C Ponnappa (Rtd), 1999.
