= Kodava language =

Dravidian language spoken in India

Kodava
- Coorg, Kodagu
- ಕೊಡವ ತಕ್ಕ್ Koḍava takkï
- Kodava Thakk in Muthanna script or Kodava Lipi
- Pronunciation: [koɖɐʋɐ t̪ɐkːɨ]
- Native to: India
- Region: Kodagu
- Ethnicity: Kodava
- Native speakers: 113,857 (2011 census)
- Language family: Dravidian: South Dravidian; South Dravidian I; Tamil–Kannada; Tamil–Kota; Tamil–Toda; Tamil–Irula; Tamil–Kodava–Urali; Kodava
- Writing system: Kodava Lipi (Official): Kannada script; Coorgi-Cox alphabet; Malayalam script; Thirke script (archaic)

Official status
- Regulated by: Karnataka Kodava Sahitya Academy

Language codes
- ISO 639-3: kfa
- Glottolog: koda1255
- ELP: Kodagu
- Kodava is classified as Definitively Endangered by the UNESCO Atlas of the World's Languages in Danger

- Person: Koḍavanï
- People: Koḍavarï
- Language: Koḍava takkï
- Country: Koḍagï

Kodava (Kodava: [koɖɐʋɐ], natively: Koḍava takkï, Kodava: [koɖɐʋɐ t̪ɐkːɨ], meaning 'speech of Kodavas', Anglicised name: Codava, Coorgi) is a Dravidian language spoken in Kodagu district (Coorg) in Southern Karnataka, India. It is an endangered language. The language has two dialects: Mendele (spoken in Northern and Central Kodagu, i.e. outside Kodagu's Kiggat naadu) and Kiggat (spoken in Kiggat naadu, in Southern Kodagu).

Historically, it has been associated to Old Canarese or Hale Kannada However, it has been re-analysed as a language by early 20th century academics. Now it is known to be more closely related to Malayalam, Tamil, and Tulu in comparative linguistics.

Its speculated to be the language "which is neither Malayalam nor Tulu, but is related to them" in the edicts found at the temples at Bhagmandala and Palur in Kodagu respectfully. They were written in variant of Grantha, described as "jumble of Grantha, Malayalam, Tamil, and a few Vattelutte [characters].", but is speculated to it's own script called Thirke, which is an abugida.

== Native speakers ==
=== Castes and tribes ===
Previously, Kodava language was spoken as native language (L1) by 21 "castes and tribes", including the Kodagu Heggades, the Kudiyas, the Kembattis, the Airis, the Ammas, the Medas, the Gollas, the Koyuvas, and the Boonepxattas. However, in modern times, the number of communities was reduced to 17, as some of them had language shift to Malayalam and Kannada.

=== Population ===
The 2011 Census of India reports 96,918 persons who returned Kodava as their mother tongue and 16,939 who returned Coorgi/Kodagu, for a total of 113,857 persons coming under the parent group which is again identified as Coorgi/Kodagu (another name for Kodava) as the mother tongue.

== Different names ==
Native to Kodagu (Coorg), the Kodava language is also known as Kodagu, Coorg, Coorgi, Kodaga, and Kodava thakk (literally meaning, a speech of the Kodavas).

== Etymology ==
Derived from koḍa "west", -(v/g)a "person".

== History ==
Academic linguistic scholars such as M. B. Emeneau of the University of California, P. S. Subrahmanyam of Annamalai University as well as Kodava scholars such as Boverianda Nanjamma and Chinnappa consider Kodava language as older than Malayalam and Badaga (before 9th century CE), (Note: Malayalam is first attested in c. 9th century CE.) but younger than Tamil, Kannada, Tulu, and Telugu languages.

In Kannada, the region was called Kodagu and the people Kodaga. Natively, the people were called Kodava and the land was called Kodavu in the folksongs. Comparative Dravidian studies show that the Kodava language belongs to the South Dravidian language group.

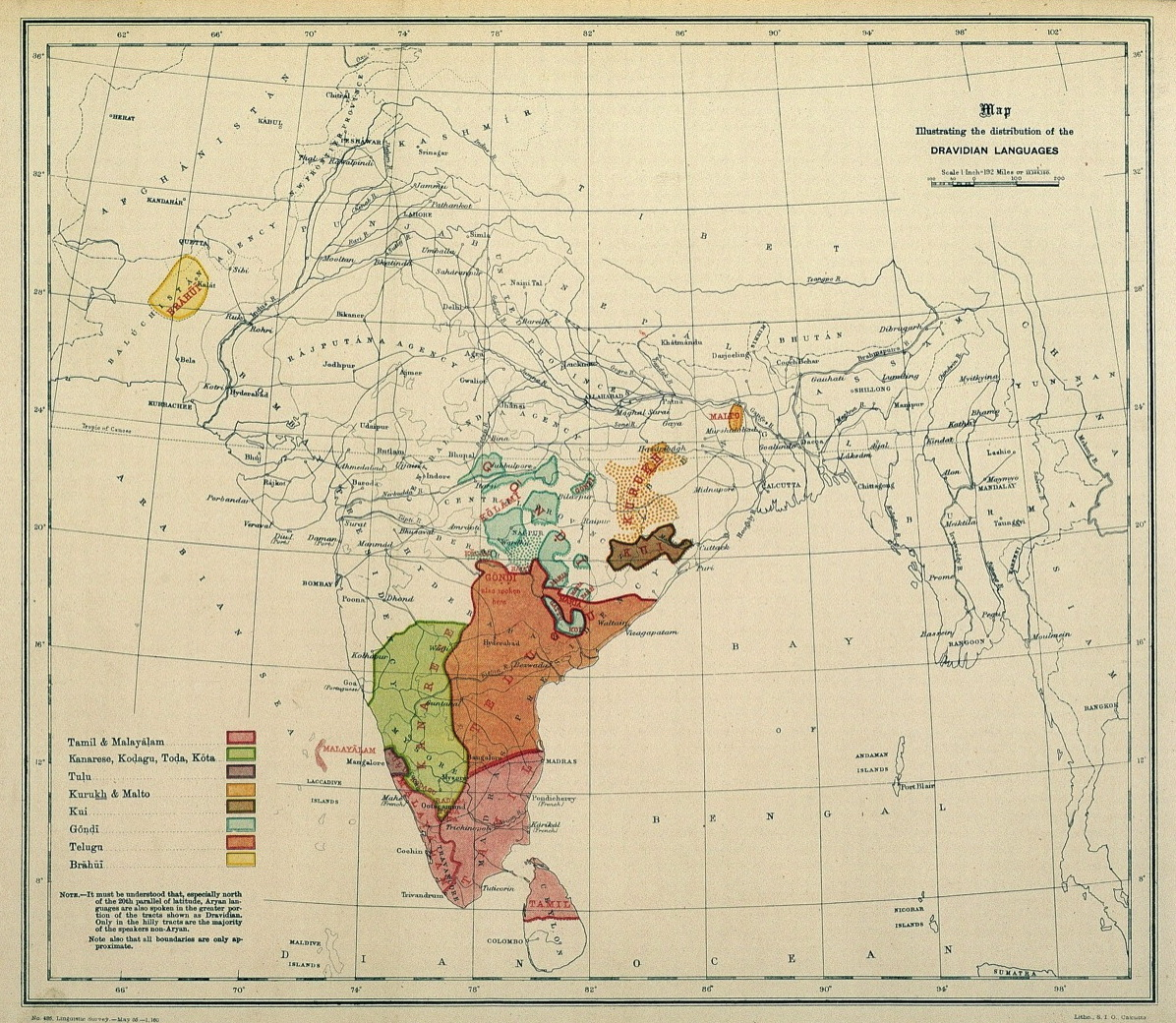
Linguistic Survey of India (1906) map of the distribution of Dravidian languages

== Phonology ==
=== Vowels ===
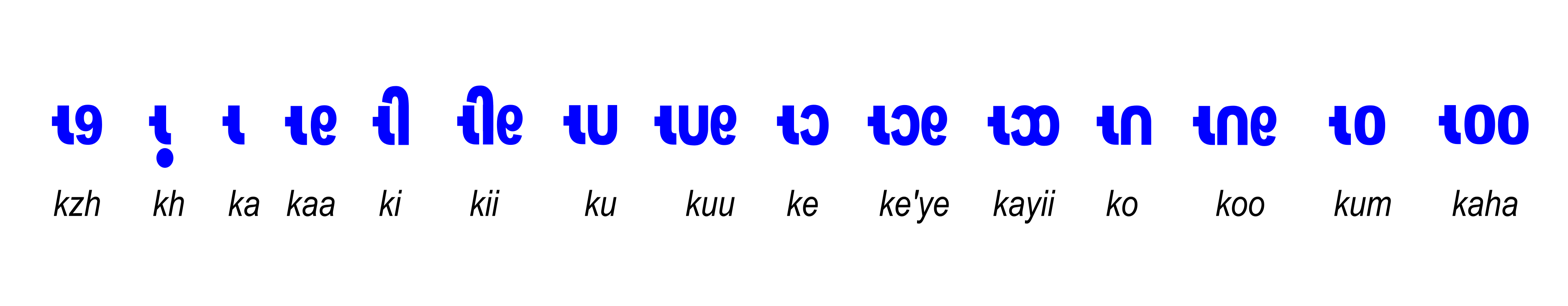
Vowels in Kodava Language

Dravidian vowel systems contain five vowel qualities i.e. those usually corresponding to a, e, i, o and u., with a short and long variants for each. However, Kodava has two more: the mid and high (close) back unrounded vowels, with corresponding long variants.

Vowels
	Front	Central	Back
Close	i	ɨ	u
Close-mid	e	ə	o
Open		a	

=== Consonants ===
Consonants
		Bilabial	Dental	Alveolar	Retroflex	Palatal	Velar	Glottal
Nasal		m	n̪		ɳ	ɲ	ŋ	
Plosive	voiceless	p	t̪		ʈ	c	k	
Plosive	voiced	b	d̪		ɖ	ɟ	g	
Fricative				s	ʂ*	ʃ		h
Approximant		ʋ		l	ɭ	j		
Trill				r				

Kodava and Kannada share a lack of palatalization of word-initial *k-, which is a feature found in the Tamil-Malayalam branch.

*Only used for Sanskrit loan words

== Writing systems ==
Kodava Takk is mostly written in the Kannada script, but can also be found written in the Malayalam script, especially along the borders with Kerala, and more recently, the Latin alphabet. Due to difficulties in properly rendering the sounds of Kodava, various other scripts were invented by Kodava writers like Iychettira M Muthanna, Koravanda Appayya, Appaneravanda Kiran Subbaiah.

=== Kodava Lipi (Muthanna script) ===
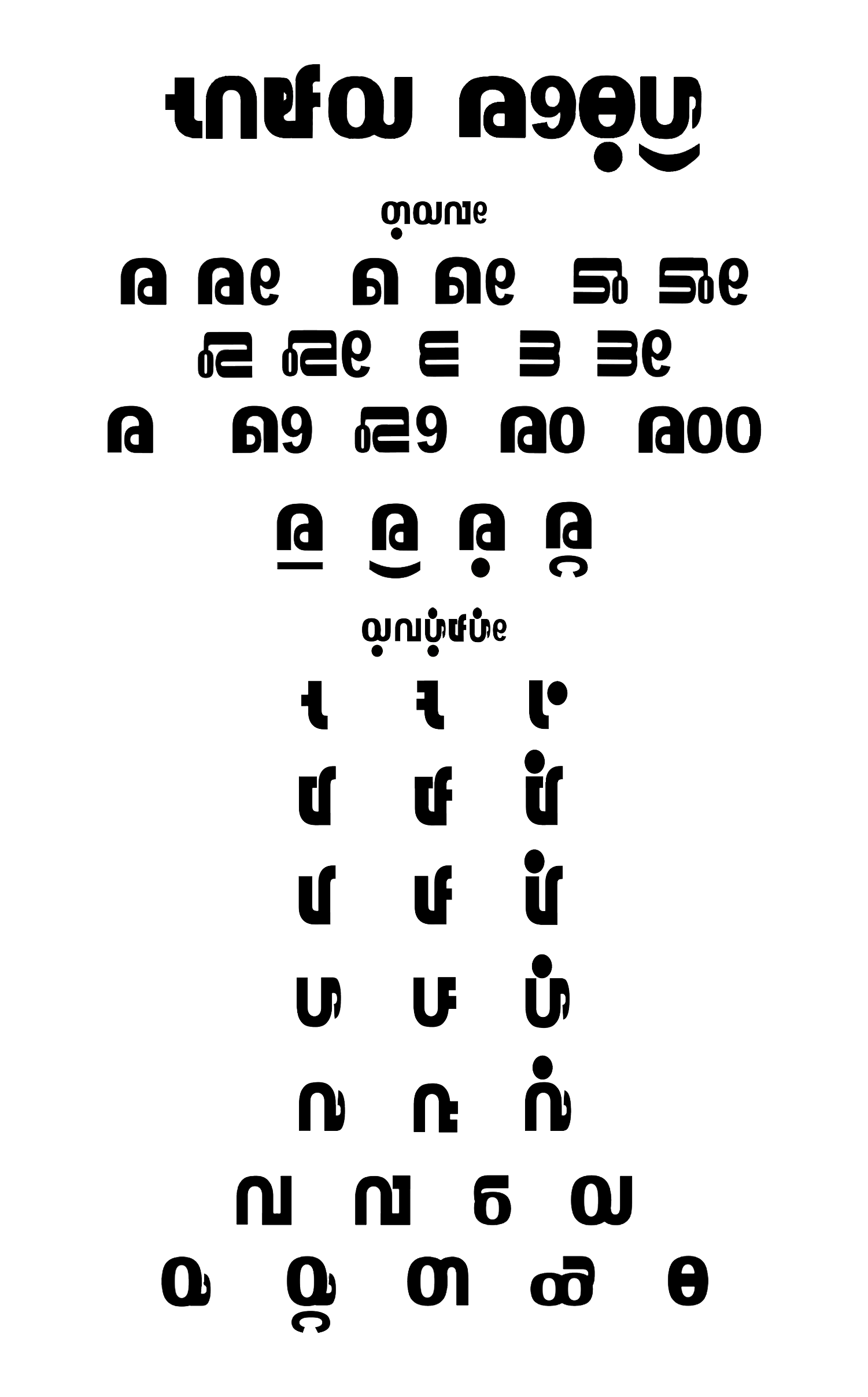
Official Script of the Kodava language developed by Dr IM Muthanna in 1971.

Dr. IM Muthanna, developed a script for Kodava in 1971, and as of 2022, the Karnataka Kodava Sahitya Academy, a government body for the development of the Kodava language, accepted and recommended that the script developed by Dr Muthanna as the official script of Kodava, as a proposal was sent to the CIIL, who as of now has yet to respond. Although around 7 scripts were developed between 1889 and 2008, only Dr Muthanna's script is considered the most acceptable for the Kodava Language.

The script is relatively simple in structure compared to other Brahmic scripts, with 16 vowels, 24 consonants and four diacritic marks. It has seen increasing but limited use across the Kodagu district since its inception.

=== Thirke script ===
A script, for a language assumed for an early stage of Kodava from the 14th century was discovered. It is now called the Thirke script. The script is a Brahmic abugida and is considered to be a mix of characters from neighboring scripts like Grantha, Tigalari, and Vatteluttu, as mentioned before.

=== Coorgi–Cox alphabet ===
The Coorgi is an alphabet developed by the linguist Gregg M. Cox that is used by a number of individuals within Kodagu district of India to write the endangered Dravidian language of Kodava, also known sometimes as Coorgi.

The script uses a combination of 26 consonant letters, eight vowel letters and a diphthong marker. Each letter represents a single sound and there are no capital letters. A computer-based font has been created. The script was developed out of the request by a group of Kodava individuals to have a distinct script for Kodava Takk, to distinguish the language. The new script is intended as a unified writing system for all Kodava Takk speakers.

History of Kodava Language - explained by Mr Bopanda Poonacha

== Classification ==
Linguistically, Kodava/Kodagu language belongs to the South Dravidian subfamily of the Dravidian family. Further within the South Dravidian subfamily, it belongs to the subgroup Tamil-Malayalam-Kodagu-Kota-Toda. It is closely related to and influenced by Kannada, Malayalam, Tamil and Tulu. A majority of the words are common between Kodava and Beary bashe, a dialect which is a mixture of Tulu and Malayalam spoken by the Beary Muslims and Kodava Thiyyar communities. Kodava is also closely related to the Kasaragod and Kannur dialects of Malayalam, which are in turn related to Beary.

== Grammar ==
The grammar of Kodagu has been systematically studied and documented since at least around 1867 when Captain R.A. Cole published the seminal work An Elementary Grammar of the Coorg Language.

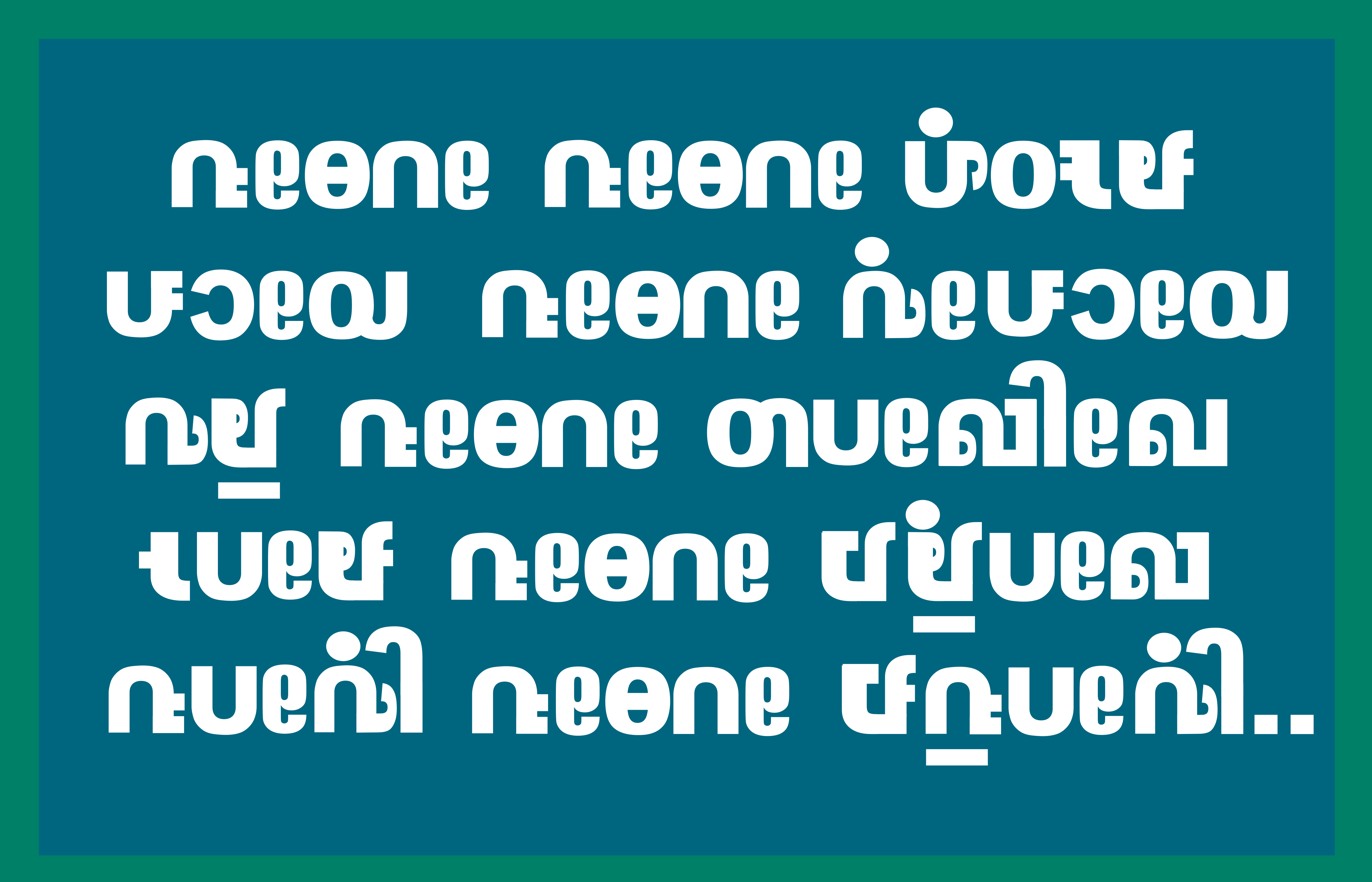
"Desha Katt" Song, Praising the provinces of Kodagu, written in the new script.

=== Nouns ===
These, as is typical in Dravidian languages, may be proper, common, verbal, derivative, or compound. A subclass of common nouns is that of relationship nouns.

Verbal nouns are formed from verbal roots with vadu, and express the act of the root; yeḷadu '(to) write' -> yeḷadu vadu 'the act of writing'.

Derivative nouns are formed from noun roots; -(k/g)ara indicates an actor or professional; paathre 'vessel' -> kumbaara 'potter'; angaḍi 'shop' -> angaḍikara 'shopkeeper'; boṭe '(the act of) hunting' -> boṭegara 'hunter'. -karu and -garu also indicate possession of a quality; budhi 'wisdom' -> budhikara 'wise man'; paṇa 'wealth' -> paṇagara 'rich man'.

Nouns, somewhat superficially, are said to be masculine, feminine, or neutral. Masculines represent males and male gods; feminines represent women and goddesses; and neuterals represent everything else (including animals - although animals can be marked with a certain sex).

Masculine nouns may be marked with aṇu and feminines with ponṇu; also, masculine nouns in -ru may be feminised with -ti.

== Literature ==
Mr Bopanada Poonacha explains the origin, design, and government certification of the Kodava logo

Family histories, rituals and other records were scripted on palm leaves called Pattole (patt=palm, ole=leaf) by astrologers in the ancient times. When Kodava was written, it was usually with Kannada script, sometimes with minor modifications. The folk songs of the Kodavas, called the Palame (also known as the Balo Patt or Dudi Patt), were orally transmitted across several generations. The language had no significant written literature until the twentieth century. Appachcha Kavi, a playwright, and Nadikerianda Chinnappa, a folk compiler, are the two important poets and writers of the Kodava language. Other important writers in the language were B D Ganapathy and I M Muthanna. In 2005, after requests from the Kodagu community, German linguist Gerard Cox created a script unique to Kodava called the Coorgi-Cox script. It uses straight lines for 5 vowels, and has circles for diphthongs.

The Pattole Palame, a collection of Kodava folksongs and traditions compiled in the early 1900s by Nadikerianda Chinnappa, was first published in 1924. The most important Kodava literature, it is said to be one of the earliest, if not the earliest, collection of folklore of a community in an Indian language. Nearly two-thirds of the book consists of folksongs that were handed down orally through generations, sung even today during marriage and death ceremonies and during festivals relating to the seasons and in honour of local deities and heroes. Traditionally known as Balo Pat, these songs are sung by four men who beat dudis (drums) as they sing. Kodava folk dances are performed to the beat of many of these songs. The Pattole Palame was written using the Kannada script originally; it has been translated into English by Boverianda Nanjamma and Chinnappa, grandchildren of Nadikerianda Chinnappa, and has been published by Rupa & Co., New Delhi.

== Cinema ==
The Kodava Cinema industry is very small. A few movies portraying the native culture and traditions of the Kodavas have been produced in this language. The first Kodava film 'Nada Mann Nada Kool' was directed by S.R.Rajan and produced in the year 1972.

== Vocabulary ==
Kodava	Kannada	Tamil	Malayalam	Tulu	English
Mudi	Hudugi	Peṇ/Peḍai/Ponnŭ	Penkutti	Ponnu	Girl
Kinah	Huduga	Aan/Peḍiyan/Paiyan/Chiruvan	Aankutti	Aan/Kinni	Boy
Po(Singular); Poyi(Plural)	Hogu	Pō(y)	Poyko	Poyi	Go
Kanni	Saaru/ganji	Kañji/Kūṭṭŭ/Chārŭ	Chaar	Kajipu	Stew (lentils, vegetables, etc.)
Kool	Anna/Kool	Chōr/Kūḻ	Chor	Nuppu	Cooked Rice
Iduh	Idu	Iḍŭ/Vai	Ide	Dee	Put
Thimbak	Tinnakke	Thinnŭ/Uṇṇŭ/Sāppiḍŭ	Tinnuka/Kazhikkuka	Thinere	To Eat
kuLi	snana	kuLi	kuLi	Meela	To Bath
Unda?	Unta/ideya?	Uṇḍā?/Irukkuthā?	Undo?	Unda?	Is There?
Bappi	Bartini	Var(uk)iṟēn/Varuvēn	Varam	Barpe	I will Come (Farewell Greeting)
Ulla-	iddene/ulle	irukkiṟēn/uḷḷēn	Ulle	Ulle	Am There
Bandand Ulla-	Baruta iddene	Var(uk)iṟēn	Varunnund	Barond ulle	Am coming
Yenene Ulliya?	Hege iddiya?	Eppaḍi/Enneṇdŭ (uḷḷ-/irukkiṟ-)(-ai/-āi/-īrgaḷ)	Engane und?	Encha ulla/ya?	How are you?
Māṅge	Maavu	Māṅgā(y)/Māmpaḻam	Māṅga/Māmpaḻam	Mudi/Kukku	Mango
Kaḷḷa	Kaḷla	Kaḷḷan/Kaḷvan/Thiruḍan	Kaḷḷan	Kalva	Thief
Suroole /Minyathele	Modalu/Suroonalli	Mudal(il)	Adyam	Suru	First
Kere Paambu	Kere Haavu	Chārai Pāmbŭ	Chēra Pamb	Keri	Rat Snake
Mūle	Mūle	Mūlai	Mūla	Mudye/mūle	Corner
Āme	Āme	Āmai	Āma	Eme	Tortoise
Bēli	Bēli	Vēli	Vēli	Bēli	Fence
Bitth/Kuru	Beeja/bitha	Vitthŭ/Vithai	Vitth/Kuru	Bitth	Seed
Bādige	Bādige	Vādakai	Vādaka	Badige	Rent
Chathe	Sante	Chanthai	Chantha	Santhe	Market
Ēni	Ēni	Ēṇi	Ēṇi	Ēni	Ladder
Pulunje Puḷi	Hunase Huli	PuLi	PuLi	Punke puli	Tamarind
Gaali/Kaath	Gaali	Kāṟṟŭ/Kāththŭ	Kaatt	Gaali	Wind
Thaari	Kodu/tha	Tharŭ/Koḍŭ	Tharu	Koru	give
Kaapi	Kaapi	Kaapi	Kaapi	Kaapi	Coffee
Paado-	Haadu	Paadŭ	Paaduka	Pada paad	to sing

=== Words for family members ===
Mother	Avva-
Father	Appa-
Grandfather	Ajja-
Grandmother	Ajjava/Ajjavya- Thaayi
Maternal Uncle / Paternal Aunt's husband	Thammaava- / Maava-
Maternal Uncle's wife / Paternal Aunt	Maavi / Thammaavi
Eldest Paternal Uncle / Eldest Maternal Aunt's husband	Balyeappa-
Eldest Paternal Uncle's wife / Eldest Maternal Aunt	Balyeavva-
Elder Paternal Uncle / Elder Maternal Aunt's husband	Bojappa-
Elder Paternal Uncle's wife / Elder Maternal Aunt	Bojavva-
Younger Paternal Uncle / Younger Maternal Aunt's husband	Kunjappa-
Younger Paternal Uncle's wife/ Younger Maternal Aunt	Kunjavva-
Youngest Paternal Uncle / Youngest Maternal Aunt's husband	Cheriyappa-
Youngest Paternal Uncle's wife/ Youngest Maternal Aunt	Cheriyavva-
Father-in-law	Maavon-
Mother-in-law	Maayi
brother-in-law (elder) / cross-cousin (elder, brother) / lineal cousin (elder, sister)'s husband	Baava-
sister-in-law (elder)/ cross-cousin (elder, sister) / lineal-cousin (elder, brother)'s wife	Momma-
brother (elder) / lineal cousin (elder brother) / cross-cousin (elder, sister)'s husband	Anna- / Annaiah
sister (elder) / lineal-cousin (elder, sister) / cross-cousin (elder, brother)'s wife	Akka / Akkaiah
brother (younger)	Thammanna-
sister (younger)	Thange
Wife	Ponne
Husband	odiya
Son	Movn-
Daughter	Mova

== Education ==
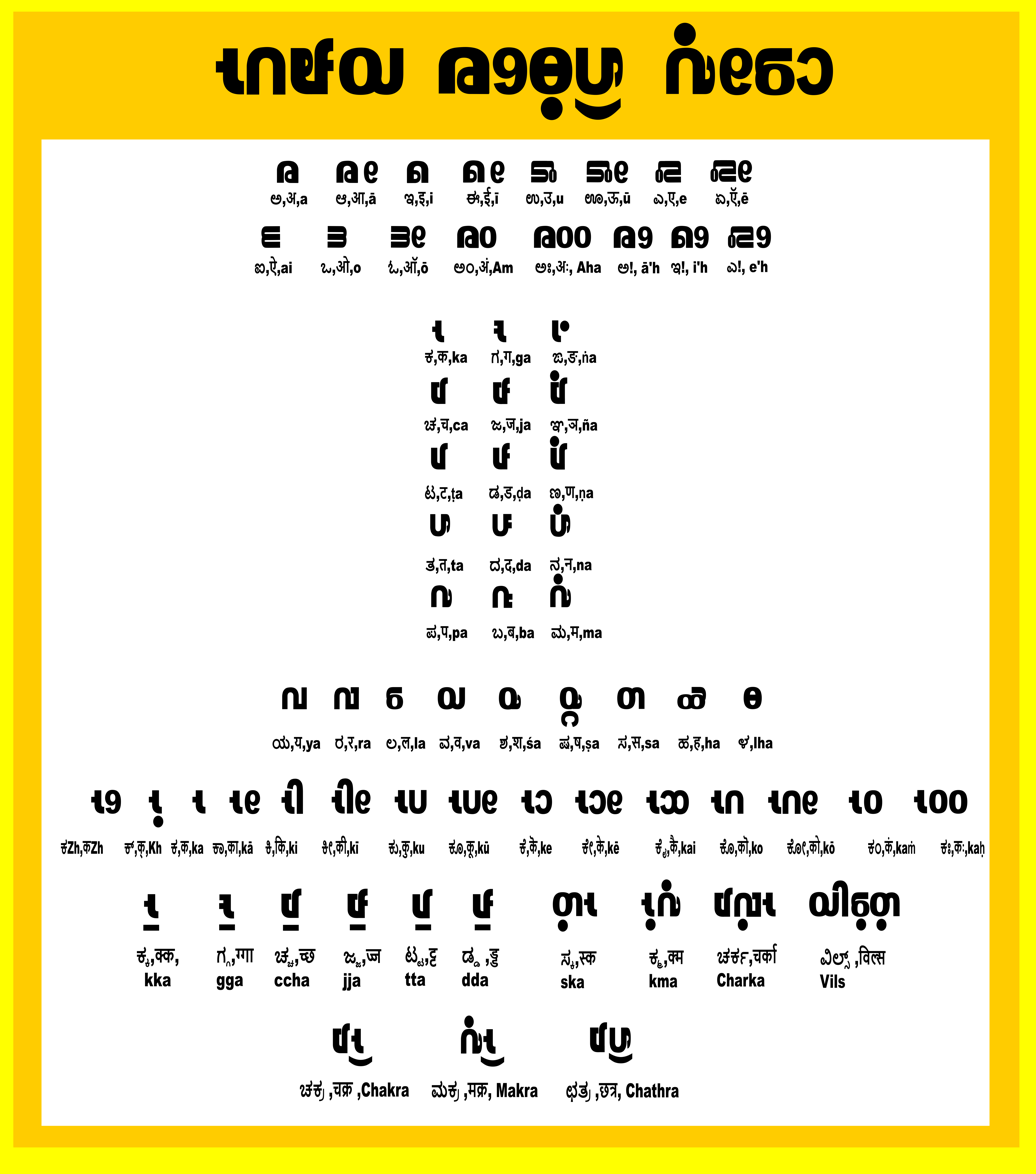
An example of digital primers released about the new script

Since 2021, the Mangalore University teaches an MA degree in the Kodava language.

Kodava is also being taught by the owner of restaurant "Umbak Entha?", Shilpa Kalengada Bopanna, to children, using the Muthanna script/Kodava Lipi

== Bibliography ==
- Cole, R A (1867). An Elementary Grammar of the Coorg Language. Bangalore: Wesleyan Mission Press.
- Bhadriraju Krishnamurti (2003). The Dravidian Languages. Cambridge Language Surveys. Cambridge University Press. ISBN 0-521-77111-0.
