= Appachcha Kavi =

Indian writer

Haradasa Appachcha Kavi
- Born: Appaneravanda Appachcha; 13 September 1868; Kodagu District, India
- Died: c. 1930; Madikeri, Kodagu District, India
- Other name: Haradasa Appachcha Kavi
- Known for: Dramas and songs in Kodava language
- Parent(s): Bollavva Appaneravanda (Mother); Medayya Appaneravanda (Father)

Appachcha Kavi (21 September 1868 – c. 1930) was an Indian poet and playwright. He belonged to the Kodava community and is known as the first playwright in the Kodava language.

== Early life ==
Appachcha (also spelled Appacha) was born in the village Kirundadu, about 15 km to the south of Madikeri in Kodagu district, Karnataka. Kirundaadu is a small village of erstwhile Napoklu Naadu. Presently Napoklu is a small town in Madikeri taluk. It is about 15 km to the south of Madikeri, the district headquarters, located in the northern part of Kodagu. His parents were Medayya and Bollavva of the Appaneravanda family. His mother was from the Kabbachchira family in Arji village, near Virajpet, in the southern part of Kodagu district.

His family were farmers and particularly interested in music. Appachcha was the only son, he had three sisters. As a child, Appachcha was soft-spoken and kind, spending much of his time in writing and singing devotional songs. Because there was no school in his native village, Appachcha was sent to live with his maternal uncle in Arji, a village near Virajpet. Here, he studied up to the fourth standard, learning the basics of the Kannada language and of arithmetic. Despite his lack of formal education, he later became a Sanskrit scholar and playwright.

== Career ==
At a young age, he began earning his livelihood. He first joined the Virajpet Naad Cutchery (government office) as a volunteer. He also worked in the police department for a period. He later worked at the Omkaaresvara temple in Madikeri (Mercara), receiving a monthly wage of Rs 8. There he met Venkatadri Shamarao, who was involved in music and drama. After about two years, Appachcha was transferred to Bhagamandala as a Parupathyagara (temple supervisor), where he met Vaidyanatha Bhatta, a Vedic scholar. During this period, he was introduced to the study of the epics (Ramayana and Mahabharata), the Puranas, and the Vedas. He thus gained exposure to religious texts and traditions.

Around 1896, Appachcha was transferred back to Madikeri, where he was made the manager of the Gaddige(the erstwhile Rajas' mausoleum). Meanwhile, he pursued his hobby and obtained a few small acting roles. A few years later, Appachcha's associate Venkatadri Shamarao started a drama company, where Appachcha was awarded a major role: that of the Raja in the play Chandrahasa by Ramarao. In the period 1904–1908, Appachcha wrote his first three plays: Yayaathi Raajanda Naataka, Sree Subrahmanya Mahathmye, and Sathi Savithri, all in the Kodava language. In 1907, Appachcha was able to quit his supervisor position and devote himself to the arts. In 1908 he established a Kodava-speaking drama company consisting of about 22 artists and toured Kodagu. He wrote his fourth play, Sree Kaaveri Nataka in 1918. Appacha Kavi was the first Indian playwright to adapt the mythological Yayathi story into a popular play.

Because relatively few people speak the Kodava language, in 1909 Appachcha closed his original company and started a Kannada language drama company with artists from the neighboring district, Mysore. His company toured Mysore, they toured places like Hunasuru, Periyapattana, and Kandalavu, exhibiting plays written by him in Kannada, such as Virata Parva, Sati Sukanya, and Ghoshayathre. In 1910, Appachcha went back to his previous job at Bhagamandala, and hence most of his drama activities came to a standstill. He retired from this post in 1917 at the age of 52.

In the year 1926, Appachcha's house was completely burned down by a fire. In order to overcome this tragedy Appachcha Kavi started the Kathakalakshepa. It was from then onwards that he was known as Haradaasa Appachcha Kavi.

== Legacy ==
Haradaasa Appacha Kavi is described as a devotee of Lord Shiva and used the name “Haradaasa” in his writings. His plays include devotional songs dedicated to both Krishna and Shiva, such as “Kaapaad Sree Krishnane” and “Thudipeno naa ninna Shivane”. His works incorporate elements of the navarasas, similar to traditional theatre forms of the period. He adapted stories from Indian mythology into Kodava cultural settings. The plays include references to Kodava customs and culture, including names of trees, fruits, flowers, birds, and animals found in Kodagu.

Appacha Kavi was a playwright, actor, director, and producer in Kodava theatre. He was also a singer and bard. He is sometimes referred to as the “Poet Laureate of Kodagu”. He was among the early playwrights in the Kodava language. Although he wrote a limited number of plays, they are regarded as significant works in Kodava literature. His songs and ballads continue to be performed in Kodagu, and recordings remain in circulation. Appacha Kavi's birthday (21 September) is observed as Kodava Sahitya Day annually.

== Main sources ==
1. Jagathigonde Kodagu, by K P Muththanna, 1969.
2. Kodavas, by B D Ganapathy, 1980.
3. A study of the Origin of Coorgs, by Lt Col K C Ponnappa (Rtd), 1999.
