= Territorial Army (India) =

Military reserve force in India

- Crest of the Territorial Army
- Active: 1949 – present
- Country: India
- Allegiance: Republic of India
- Branch: Indian Army
- Type: Army
- Role: Reserve Force
- Size: 203,000 includes 43,000 first line and 160,000 second line
- TA Group Headquarters: Chandimandir (Western command); Lucknow (Central command); Kolkata (Eastern command); Pune (Southern command); Udhampur (Northern command)
- Nickname: Terriers
- Mottos: Savdhani Va Shoorta (Vigilance and Valour)
- Anniversaries: 9 October (Raising Day)
- Engagements: 1962 India-China War; 1965 Indo-Pak war 1971 Indo-Pakistani War; Operation Pawan; Operation Rakshak; Kargil War
- Website: https://indianarmy.nic.in/

Commanders
- Director General: Lt Gen Prasanna Kishore Mishra
- Chief of Army Staff: General Dhiraj Seth

Insignia
- Insignia: Chain of Lotus and the Lion Capital of Ashoka
- Flag

The Territorial Army (TA) is a military reserve force composed of part-time volunteers who provide support services to the Indian Army. It consists of officers, junior commissioned officers, non-commissioned officers, and other personnel who hold ranks identical to those in the Indian Army, and also maintain civilian occupations. The primary role of the TA is to "relieve the regular army from static duties and assist civil administration in dealing with natural calamities and maintenance of essential services" and to "provide units for the regular army as and when required".

The present Director General of Territorial Army is Lieutenant General Prasanna Kishore Mishra.

== History ==
In 1612, when the English East India Company reached Surat, it established a contingent of part-time soldiers comprising the company's employees to safeguard its commercial interests. In 1687, the Governor and Council of Fort St. George ordered the creation of the Companie of Trained Bands, a part-time force based in Madras. This force was established to defend against the rival French East India Company and native princely states. The Company played a role in the Battle of Plassey on 23 June 1757, and many of its part-time units were eventually converted into regular and irregular forces.

After the Indian Rebellion of 1857, the British Crown assumed control of Indian administration from the East India Company. Existing part-time forces were reorganized, resulting in the creation of the Volunteer Force (VFI) through legislation. As British rule expanded in India, full-time regular forces gained prominence. The VFI engaged in military conflicts both in India and abroad, including the Second Boer War and the First World War. Subsequently, the VFI was restructured and replaced by the Indian Defence Force (IDF).

The IDF, organized into separate European and Indian sections, was established by the Imperial Legislative Council on 9 October 1917 to release regular troops from garrison duties during World War I. Indians served as volunteers, while Europeans were conscripted. The Indian Defence Force Act of 1917 mandated military service for all European males (except clergy) aged 16 to 50 permanently residing in British India, including princely states. Those aged 16 to 18 were obligated to undergo training, while men over 40 were required to serve in their local districts. Men between 19 and 40 were obligated to serve wherever needed within British India.

The IDF's youth wing, known as the University Corps (UC), was established at the universities of Calcutta, Bombay, Madras, and Allahabad. The IDF was generally unpopular among British conscripts. In 1920, it was replaced by two volunteer organizations: the Auxiliary Force (AFI) for European and Anglo-Indian officers and the Indian Territorial Force (ITF) for Indian other ranks. The UC was reorganized as the University Training Corps (UTC) under the ITF and was later renamed University Officers' Training Corps (UOTC). After India's independence, the AFI was disbanded as its services were no longer required. The ITF was restructured into the newly formed Territorial Army, and the UOTC was converted into the National Cadet Corps (NCC).

Post-independence, the Territorial Army Bill was introduced in the Constituent Assembly (the then Parliament of India) on 23 August 1948. It was passed on 1 September and came into force on 10 September. It allowed civilians pursuing other professions to serve part-time in the army. The TA was constituted by reorganising and redesignating 11 ITF infantry units. The first TA camp was inaugurated by the first Governor-General of independent India, C. Rajagopalachari, on 9 October 1949. Since then, the annual Territorial Army Day has been observed on 9 October. During the India-China conflict in 1959, defence minister V. K. Krishna Menon, in a radio address, asked Indians to volunteer for the TA.

The TA was constituted by the Territorial Army Act of 1948 in the Dominion of India as a successor to the Indian Defence Force (1917–1920) and the Indian Territorial Force (1920–1948). It is commanded by a three-star ranking Director General of the Territorial Army, typically a Lieutenant General-ranking officer deputed from the Indian Army, and headed by the Chief of Defence Staff under the Department of Military Affairs of the Ministry of Defence. The TA has two units—a departmental unit consisting of employees of public sector undertakings (PSU) and the Indian Railway and ex-servicemen; and a non-departmental unit consisting of privately employed civilians.

The TA has participated in all of India's wars since the country's independence, including the Sino-Indian War of 1962, Indo-Pakistani War of 1965, Indo-Pakistani War of 1971, and the Kargil War. The TA has also taken part in Operation Pawan (1987) in Sri Lanka, Operation Rakshak in Punjab and Jammu and Kashmir, Operation Rhino (1991) and Operation Bajrang (1990–1991) in Northeast India, and Operation Parakram in Jammu and Kashmir.

Initially, the Territorial Army comprised various types of units, including Armoured Regiment (TA), Infantry Battalion (TA), Air Defence (TA), Medical Regiment (TA), Engineers Field Park Coy (TA), Signal Regiment (TA), EME Workshop (TA), Coast Battery (TA), ASC GT Coy (TA), ASC Compo Pl (TA), and AMC Field Ambulances (TA). By 1972, these units, except for the infantry battalions, were either disbanded or became part of the regular army. In 2019, the TA began accepting women in officer and other ranks.

== Role ==
By law, the Territorial Army is an integral part of the Indian Army, whose composition is defined in the Part I of the Defence Services Regulations, which states; "the army comprises regular army, regular reserves, and the Territorial Army". Part-time TA personnel may fall within the definition of regular army when attached to a unit. The Territorial Army Act 1948 states, for the purpose of sections 128, 130, and 131 of the Code of Criminal Procedure (CrPC); "all officers, non-commissioned officers and other enrolled persons who have been attached to a unit shall be deemed to be officers, non-commissioned officers and soldiers respectively of the Regular Army". This is further complimented in the Army Act, 1950, which defines regular army as "regular army means officers, junior commissioned officers, warrant officers, non-commissioned officers and other enrolled persons who, by their commission, warrant, terms of enrolment or otherwise, are liable to render continuously for a term military service to the [Indian] Union in any part of the world, including persons belonging to the Reserve Forces and the Territorial Army when called out on permanent service".

According to the TA Act 1948; "every officer or enrolled person shall be liable to perform military service: (a) when called out in the prescribed manner to act in support of the civil power or to provide essential guards; (b) when embodied in the prescribed manner for training or for supporting or supplementing the regular forces; and (c) when attached to any regular forces either at his own request or under the prescribed conditions". The act also says no personnel has any liability to serve beyond the "limits of India" unless under a General or by a special order of the Government of India.

The concept of the TA was redefined multiple times by the TA Review Committee, nominated by the Government of India. The first review of 1971 defined it as "... to provide part-time military training to gainfully employed citizens of the nation"; and the 1982 review said "... TA should be based on part-time and full-time units and recruitment to be all citizens who fulfil the prescribed standard, while in consonance with the traditional concept, every effort should be made to enroll gainfully employed persons". The third review, in 1995, recommended a restructure to make it a tri-service organisation, including the Indian Navy and the Indian Air Force, named the Indian Territorial Force; and passage of the Indian Territorial Force Act.

As per Army Order. 77/1984, the present role of the TA is to "relieve the regular army from static duties and assist civil administration in dealing with natural calamities and maintenance of essential services in situations where life of the communities is affected or the security of the country is threatened and to provide units for regular army as and when required".

=== Expanding scope ===
At the time of its inception, the TA was well received by the Indian Army, Navy, and Air Force, but the concept was eroded and confined to some infantry and departmental units of the Indian Army. Former Indian Army colonel and columnist Balwan Singh Nagial wrote the "expansion of the regular army certainly overshadowed the concept of TA. Instead, it should have happened the other way around, keeping in view the cost-effectiveness of TA". In February 2020, General Bipin Rawat stated "TAisation of defence forces" is a way to reduce the cost of running the military. After the restructuring of the Indian Armed Forces by introducing the Chief of Defence Staff and the Department of Military Affairs in March 2020, the TA's focus expanded to include more operational and intelligence-gathering roles to cut costs of the Indian Army. In 2020, the TA was in a phase of gradual expansion.

In July 2022, the TA started recruiting Mandarin-language graduates as officers as part of an effort by the Indian Army to increase its expertise in Mandarin and Tibetology amid the 2020–2022 China–India skirmishes and efforts of China's People's Liberation Army to recruit Hindi interpreters for posting in Tibet Autonomous Region.

== Activities ==
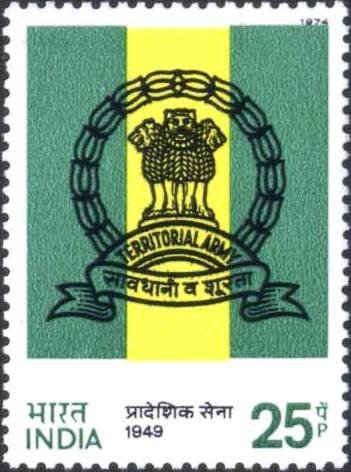
25th anniversary postage stamp (1974)

Territorial Army units were actively involved in military operations in the Sino-Indian War of 1962, Indo-Pakistani War of 1965, Indo-Pakistani War of 1971 and the Kargil War. The TA has participated in all wars since independence; subsequently, many of its air defence and artillery units were converted into regular army units. The TA also took part in Operation Pawan (1987) in Sri Lanka, Operation Rakshak in Punjab and Jammu and Kashmir, and Operation Rhino (1991) and Operation Bajrang (1990–1991) in Northeast India. Departmental units assisted the civil authorities during industrial unrest and natural calamities, particularly the 1991 Uttarkashi earthquake, the 1993 Latur earthquake and the 1999 Odisha cyclone.

The TA, as part of the Indian Peace Keeping Force, was involved in peacekeeping activities in Sri Lanka from 29 July 1987 to 24 March 1990. Since the early 1990s, units have been actively deployed in Jammu and Kashmir, Northeast India, and along India's northern and western borders. According to a 2021 report, approximately 75 percent of TA units are deployed in counter-insurgency and counter-terrorism-prone areas in these regions. Since 1994, many TA soldiers serve as regular troops in counter-insurgency areas like Jammu and Kashmir for up to three years. The TA participated in rescue and relief operations following the 2001 Gujarat earthquake and protected oil installations in Vadodara during the riots the followed the Godhra train burning incident in 2002.

The TA has also participated in mountaineering activities. The joint Indo-British TA Mountaineering Expedition scaled Mount Kokthang (6,147 metres (20,167 ft)) in October 1982 and September 1994, and Mount Tenchenkhang (6,010 metres (19,720 ft)) in May 1998 in West Sikkim. The Ecological Battalion units planted 2.5 crore saplings over 20,000 hectares (49,000 acres) of land at Mussoorie and Pithoragarh hill stations in Uttarakhand, Bikaner and Jaisalmer in Rajasthan, ravines of Chambal in Madhya Pradesh, and Bhatti mines in Delhi. As of 2021, Ecological Task Forces has planted 6.9 crore saplings covering an area of 72,761 hectares (179,800 acres) with a 65-to-75-percent survival rate. In 2020, plans to increase the presence of TA personnel in the Andaman and Nicobar Islands were made due to concerns about Chinese intrusion.

On the night of 29 June 2022, a landslide occurred at the company location of 107 Infantry Battalion (TA) near Tupul railway station in Manipur that had been deployed to protect the under-construction Jiribam–Imphal line; 31 TA personnel died. The family of each TA serviceperson received more than ₹1 crore in compensation and benefits, and future benefits for their children.

== Organisation ==
Until 2020, the TA was headed by an Additional Directorate General of Territorial Army (ADG TA); this role was held by a major general of the Indian Army, and came under the office of the Chief of the Army Staff (COAS). From March 2020 onward, following a restructuring of the Indian Armed Forces, the TA is headed by a Director General of Territorial Army (DG TA); this role is held by a lieutenant general from the Indian Army, and comes under the office of the Chief of Defence Staff (CDS) of the newly created Department of Military Affairs, which is under the Ministry of Defence. Lieutenant General Devendra Pratap Pandey was the first DG TA and General Bipin Rawat was the first CDS of the Indian Armed Forces.

The TA has infantry and engineer units affiliated to various regiments of the Indian Army. Beside, it also has ecological battalions for restoration of environment. The TA units are classified as departmental units (including Indian Railways, Oil and Natural Gas Corporation, Indian Oil Corporation, Bharat Petroleum Corporation Limited, and Hindustan Petroleum Corporation Limited) and non-departmental units of infantry battalions, home and hearth, and engineers regiments. The departmental units are funded by state governments, Ministry of Petroleum and Natural Gas, Ministry of Railways, and Ministry of Environment, Forest and Climate Change, while the non-departmental units are funded by the Ministry of Defence.

=== Group headquarters ===
- TA GP HQ, Southern Command – Pune, Maharashtra - 13 infantry, 4 departmental units (railway, oil, marketing), 2 ETF
- TA GP HQ, Eastern Command – Kolkata, West Bengal
- TA GP HQ, Western Command – Chandigarh
- TA GP HQ, Central Command – Lucknow, Uttar Pradesh
- TA GP HQ, Northern Command – Udhampur, Jammu & Kashmir

=== Zones ===
There are zonal divisions, and recruitment is zonal-based.

- Zone I – Haryana, Himachal Pradesh, Jammu and Kashmir, Punjab, Delhi, and Chandigarh.
- Zone II – Bihar, Madhya Pradesh, Odisha, Uttar Pradesh, Jharkhand, Chhattisgarh, and Uttarakhand.
- Zone III – Assam, Meghalaya, Manipur, Tripura, Nagaland, Sikkim, West Bengal, Mizoram, Arunachal Pradesh, and Andaman and Nicobar Islands.
- Zone IV – Andhra Pradesh, Gujarat, Kerala, Tamil Nadu, Rajasthan, Maharashtra, Karnataka, Goa, Dadra and Nagar Haveli and Daman and Diu, Lakshdweep, and Pondicherry.

== Departmental units ==
On 1 March 1983, the 801 Engineer Regiment R&P (TA) was established as a Departmental Territorial Army unit at Agra Fort under the Ministry of Petroleum, Chemicals & Fertilizers (later renamed as Ministry of Petroleum and Natural Gas). The unit was formed to operate oil refineries & pipelines in an emergency, and to cater for the Indian Oil Corporation. In 1985, the unit's scope was extended to other oil companies. The idea of raising oil-sector units was mooted after civil unrest in Assam in 1980, which resulted in a loss of more than ₹5,000 crore in oil production. The duties of oil-sector units are technical in nature. During their embodied service in the TA, these personnel perform the jobs they were doing in their civilian roles.

In the early 1980s, the fragile ecology of the Sivalik Hills and the environmental stability of the Mussoorie hills deteriorated due to illegal limestone mining, increasing the rate of desertification. Norman Borlaug, the director of Mexico's International Maize and Wheat Improvement Center, proposed to India's prime minister Indira Gandhi to use the Indian Army to recover the region's ecology. The government decided to raise TA units by enrolling ex-servicemen with the dual aim of rejuvenating the ecology and the settlement of ex-servicemen. Units were raised under the aegis of the Ministry of Environment, Forest and Climate Change and the Ministry of Defense in conjunction with state governments. It was recommended that each state have one ETF unit to operate for state forestry departments. The first Ecological Task Force Battalion was raised on 1 December 1982; as of 2021, 10 ETF units were carrying out afforestation activities in rugged and ecologically degraded areas.

In 2018, the Composite Ecological Task Force (CETF), also called the Ganga Task Force, was raised as part of the Namami Gange Programme of the National Mission for Clean Ganga (NMCG), which aimed to maintain the cleanliness of the Ganges river. The unit comprises ex-servicemen whom the Central Pollution Control Board trains to test the river water. They also carry out afforestation activities on the river's banks. The CETF was raised after a proposal by the Department of Ex-servicemen Welfare.

On 3 June 2022, after reviewing a report by a constituted committee and with the agreement of the Ministry of Defence and Directorate General of Territorial Army (DGTA), the Ministry of Railways disbanded five out of the six Railway Engineers Regiments (TA) that were based at Jhansi, Kota, Adra, Chandigarh, and Secunderabad, keeping only the Jamalpur regiment for operational duties along the critical, 361-kilometre (224-mile) New Jalpaiguri-Siliguri-Newmal-Alipurduar-Rangiya rail link through the Siliguri Corridor and to Rangiya as proposed by the Ministry of Defence. The disbandment process was to be completed by the DGTA within nine months.

Several hospitals are affiliated with the Territorial Army, such as General Hospital (TA) at Kolkata, Allahabad, Jaipur, Patiala, Guwāhāti, Ahmadabad, and Rohtak. These units are activated to treat army personnel during wartime. In 2009, the TA activated the M & J Institute of Ophthalmology, Ahmedabad, after 30 years, to perform a mock drill.

=== Current units ===
Oil sector

- 801 Engineer Regiment Refineries & Pipelines (TA), Agra
- 811 Engineer Regiment ONGC (TA), Baroda
- 414 ASC Battalion Marketing (TA), Kamptee

Indian Railway

- 969 Railway Engineers Regiment (TA), Jamalpur

Ecological Task Forces (ETF)

- 127 Infantry Battalion (TA) Garhwal Rifles Eco, Dehradun
- 128 Infantry Battalion (TA) Rajputana Rifles Eco, Jaisalmer
- 129 Infantry Battalion (TA) JAK LI Eco, Samba
- 130 Infantry Battalion (TA) Kumaon Eco, Pithoragarh
- 132 Infantry Battalion (TA) Rajput Eco, New Delhi
- 133 Infantry Battalion (TA) Dogra Eco, Shimla
- 134 Infantry Battalion (TA) Assam Eco, Sonitpur
- 135 Infantry Battalion (TA) Assam Eco, Kokrajhar
- 136 Infantry Battalion (TA) Mahar Eco, Aurangabad
- 137 Composite Eco-Task Force Battalion (TA) 39 Gorkha Regiment, Allahabad

== Non-departmental units ==
In 2003–2004, Home and Hearth (H&H) units were raised, based on the "sons of the soil" model. The 162 Infantry Battalion TA JAK LI (H&H) is exclusively for Ikhwans. The H&H personnel are recruited only from Jammu and Kashmir. H&H units are deployed in northern and eastern regions of the state and 70 percent of the infantry battalion troops are sent for counterinsurgency duties. In 2015, the government sanctioned three engineering units in Jammu and Kashmir. Two units for Kashmir and one for Jammu. The Engineer Regiments are deployed for maintenance of the Line of Control.

=== Current units ===
Infantry Battalions

- 101 Infantry Battalion (TA) Maratha Light Infantry, Pune
- 102 Infantry Battalion (TA) Punjab Regiment, Kalka
- 103 Infantry Battalion (TA) Sikh Light Infantry, Ludhiana
- 105 Infantry Battalion (TA) Rajputana Rifles, Delhi Cantonment
- 106 Infantry Battalion (TA) Parachute Regiment, Bengaluru
- 107 Infantry Battalion (TA) 11 Gorkha Rifles, Darjeeling
- 108 Infantry Battalion (TA) Mahar Regiment, Madhya Pradesh
- 109 Infantry Battalion (TA) Maratha Light Infantry, Kolhapur
- 110 Infantry Battalion (TA) Madras Regiment, Coimbatore
- 111 Infantry Battalion (TA) Kumaon Regiment, Prayagraj
- 112 Infantry Battalion (TA) Dogra Regiment, Jalandhar
- 113 Infantry Battalion (TA) Rajput Regiment, Kolkata
- 114 Infantry Battalion (TA) Jat Regiment, Fatehgarh
- 115 Infantry Battalion (TA) Mahar Regiment, Belgaum
- 116 Infantry Battalion (TA) Parachute Regiment, Devlali
- 117 Infantry Battalion (TA) Brigade of the Guards, Tiruchirappalli
- 118 Infantry Battalion (TA) The Grenadiers, Bhusawal
- 119 Infantry Battalion (TA) Assam Regiment, Shillong
- 120 Infantry Battalion (TA) Bihar Regiment, Bhubaneswar
- 121 Infantry Battalion (TA) Garhwal Rifles, Kolkata
- 122 Infantry Battalion (TA) Madras Regiment, Kannur
- 123 Infantry Battalion (TA) The Grenadiers, Jaipur
- 124 Infantry Battalion (TA) Sikh Regiment, New Delhi
- 125 Infantry Battalion (TA) Brigade of the Guards, Secunderabad
- 126 Infantry Battalion (TA) Jammu and Kashmir Rifles, Madhopur
- 150 Infantry Battalion (TA) Punjab Regiment, New Delhi
- 151 Infantry Battalion (TA) Jat Regiment, Muzaffarpur
- 152 Infantry Battalion (TA) Sikh Regiment, Ludhiana
- 153 Infantry Battalion (TA) Dogra Regiment, Meerut
- 154 Infantry Battalion (TA) Bihar Regiment, Brichgunj, Port Blair
- 155 Infantry Battalion (TA) Jammu and Kashmir Rifles, Naya Raipur

Infantry Battalion (Home and Hearth)

- 156 Infantry Battalion TA (H&H) Punjab Regiment, Rajouri, J&K
- 157 Infantry Battalion TA (H&H) Sikh Regiment, Bari Brahmana, J&K
- 158 Infantry Battalion TA (H&H) Sikh Light Infantry, Janglot, J&K
- 159 Infantry Battalion TA (H&H) Dogra Regiment, Thalela, J&K
- 160 Infantry Battalion TA (H&H) Jammu and Kashmir Rifles, Kupwara, J&K
- 161 Infantry Battalion TA (H&H) Jammu and Kashmir Light Infantry, Baramulla, J&K
- 162 Infantry Battalion TA (H&H) Jammu and Kashmir Light Infantry, Srinagar, J&K
- 163 Infantry Battalion TA (H&H) Sikh Light Infantry, Hyderbeigh, J&K
- 164 Infantry Battalion TA (H&H) Naga Regiment, Jakhama
- 165 Infantry Battalion TA (H&H) Assam Regiment, Imphal
- 166 Infantry Battalion TA (H&H) Assam Regiment, Tezpur
- 172 Infantry Battalion (TA) Madras Regiment, Campbell Bay

Engineer Regiment

- 173 Engineer Regiment (TA)
- 174 Engineer Regiment (TA)
- 175 Engineer Regiment (TA)

== Personnel ==
The Territorial Army has a strength of more than 43,000 first-line troops and 160,000 second-line troops, as of the data of 2019. Individuals seeking to join the TA must be employed in mainstay civilian professions or be self-employed. Members are required to undergo two months of mandatory paid service every year. Although the TA states that it "does not provide a full-time career", soldiers can choose to remain embodied for longer periods. TA personnel are entitled to all benefits available to the Indian Army, except gratuity and pension, which are determined by the number of full years served.

=== Rank structure ===
Officers

Rank group	General / flag officers	Senior officers			Junior officers
Territorial Army							No insignia
Territorial Army	Brigadier ब्रिगेडियर	Colonel कर्नल	Lieutenant colonel लेफ्टिनेंट - कर्नल	Major मेजर	Captain कप्तान	Lieutenant लेफ्टिनेंट	Officer cadet

JCO and Other Ranks

Rank group	Junior commissioned officers			Non commissioned officer			Enlisted
Territorial Army							No insignia
Territorial Army	Subedar Major सूबेदार मेजर	Subedar सूबेदार	Naib Subedar नायब सूबेदार	Havildar हवलदार	Naik नायक	Lance Naik लांस नायक	Sepoy सिपाही

=== Training ===
==== Non-departmental ====
Urban systems of training

Training is carried out on weekends and holidays. Four hours of training is counted as one day.

- Recruit Training: 32 days in the first year only, including a camp of not less than 4 days if the trainee volunteers with the written consent of his employer, if any.
- Annual Training: A minimum of 30 days, with extensions up to a maximum of 60 days, including a camp for 14 days.
- Post Commission Training: All Officers are required to undergo 10 weeks of Post commission Training within two years of their commissioning.
- Voluntary training: To gain additional military training, the trainee volunteers with the written consent of the employer, if any.

Provincial systems of training

- Recruit Training: For a continuous period of 30 days in the first year only.
- Annual Training: For a continuous period of two calendar months in the first and subsequent years.
- Post-commission Training: 10 weeks of post-commission training are compulsory within two years of commissioning.
- Voluntary training: To gain additional military training, the trainee volunteers with the written consent of his employer, if any.

==== Departmental ====
- Recruit Training: Carried out for a continuous period of 30 days in the first year in a camp. No training for Medical and Nursing officers of General Hospital (TA).
- Annual Training: In the first and subsequent years, annual training is carried out for a continuous period of 30 days in a camp. For officers of General Hospital (TA), this is carried out on weekends, without a camp, four hours of training being counted as one day.
- Post commission training: 30 days post commission training within two years of commissioning is compulsory for all Departmental TA officers, except medical officers of Railway (TA) units and officers of General Hospitals (TA).
- Voluntary Training: Departmental TA personnel who volunteer with the specific consent of their departments can be attached for voluntary training.

=== Celebrity members ===
Honorary ranks

- Nana Patekar, the actor, joined as a Captain in the TA in 1990 to prepare for the film Prahaar. He also served in the 1999 Kargil War as a Major in the Maratha Light Infantry Regiment.
- Kapil Dev, the former cricketer, was conferred with an honorary rank of lieutenant colonel in the TA on 24 September 2008.
- Mohanlal, the actor, was conferred with an honorary rank of lieutenant colonel on 9 July 2009. Earlier, he had shown interest in joining the TA, but since he exceeded the age limit of 42 years, the army decided to confer him with an honorary rank instead, as a goodwill ambassador for promoting TA among the youth.
- Abhinav Bindra, the sports shooter, was conferred with the rank of honorary lieutenant colonel on 1 November 2011 for his contribution in the field of shooting.
- Deepak Rao, a military trainer in close quarter battle, was conferred with an honorary rank of major in the TA on 1 November 2011.
- MS Dhoni, the cricketer, was conferred with the rank of honorary lieutenant colonel on 1 November 2011 for his contribution in the field of cricket.
- Neeraj Chopra, 2025, Lieutenant Colonel (Rajputana Rifles)

Others

- Anurag Thakur, Member of Parliament in the Lok Sabha, former Union Cabinet Minister, has been commissioned to the rank of lieutenant on 29 July 2016.
- Rao Birender Singh, former Chief Minister of Haryana.
- Kamakhya Prasad Singh Deo, former Union Cabinet Minister.
- Manvendra Singh, former Member of Parliament in the Lok Sabha.
- Sachin Pilot, former Deputy Chief Minister of Rajasthan. Pilot became the first Union Cabinet Minister to be commissioned as an officer in the TA on 6 September 2012.
- Dharampal Rajpurohit, a corporate leader and Managing Director at Barclays.

== Band and sports ==
The TA has a military band named Territorial Army Symphony. It was raised in 2009 and has more than 40 musicians, playing brass, strings, and Indian classical instruments. The band performs both contemporary and traditional music.

The Territorial Army has a multi-purpose stadium in Amravati, Maharashtra, called the Territorial Army Parade Ground, which was formerly known as Reforms Club Ground, that hosts mostly cricket matches. TA personnel engage in sporting activities such as volleyball and basketball. They also participate in army shooting competitions and conduct competitions such as TA inter-battalion football and volleyball events. In 2016, the 118 Infantry Battalion (TA) and the Cycle Polo Federation of India jointly organized the National Cycle Polo Championship, TA won the men's senior division. TA lost to Air Force Cycle Polo team in the National Cycle Polo Championship (2021–22). The TA has also organised golfing competitions.

== Awards and decorations ==
TA personnel have received many awards and decorations. As of 2021, these include one Ashok Chakra, one Kirti Chakra, five Ati Vishisht Seva Medals, five Vir Chakras, five Shaurya Chakra, one Yudh Seva Medal, 78 Sena Medals, 28 Vishisht Seva Medals, 17 Mentioned-in-Dispatches, and 280 COAS commendation cards.

== Gallery ==
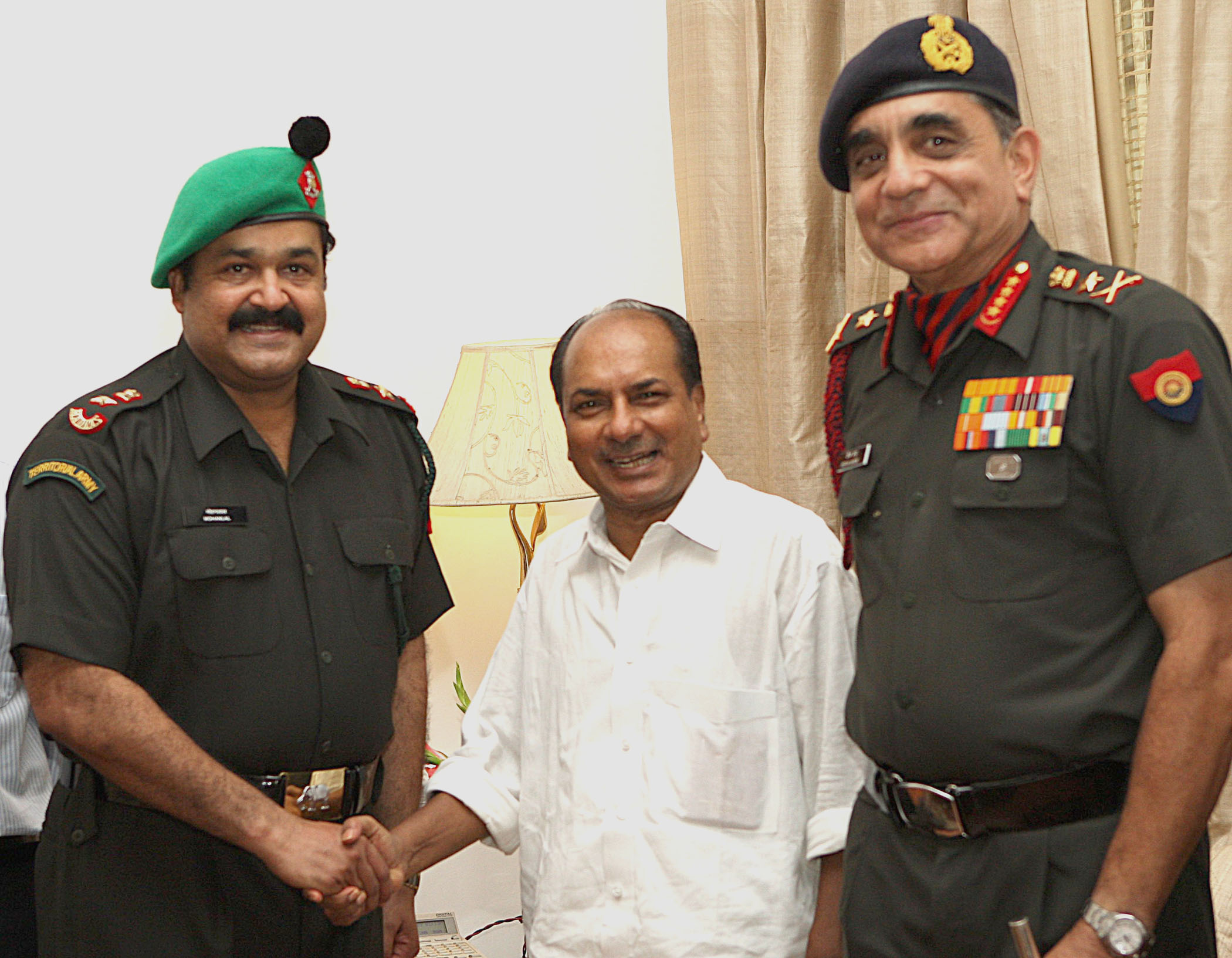
Mohanlal (left) with the then Defence Minister A. K. Antony and Chief of the Army Staff Deepak Kapoor after joining the TA in 2009.

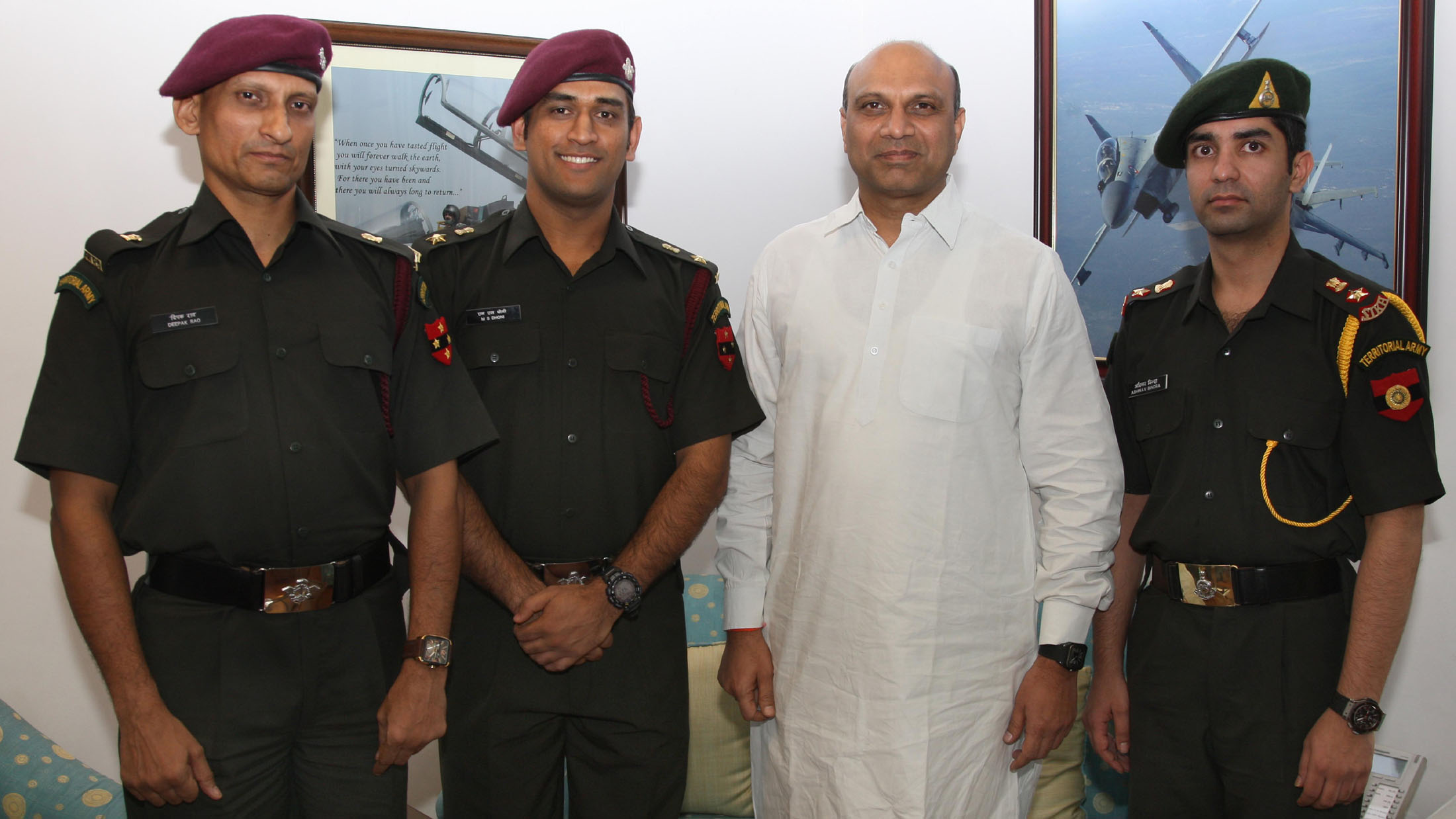
Deepak Rao, M. S. Dhoni, and Abhinav Bindra (right) with then Minister of State for Defence M. M. Pallam Raju after joining TA in 2011.

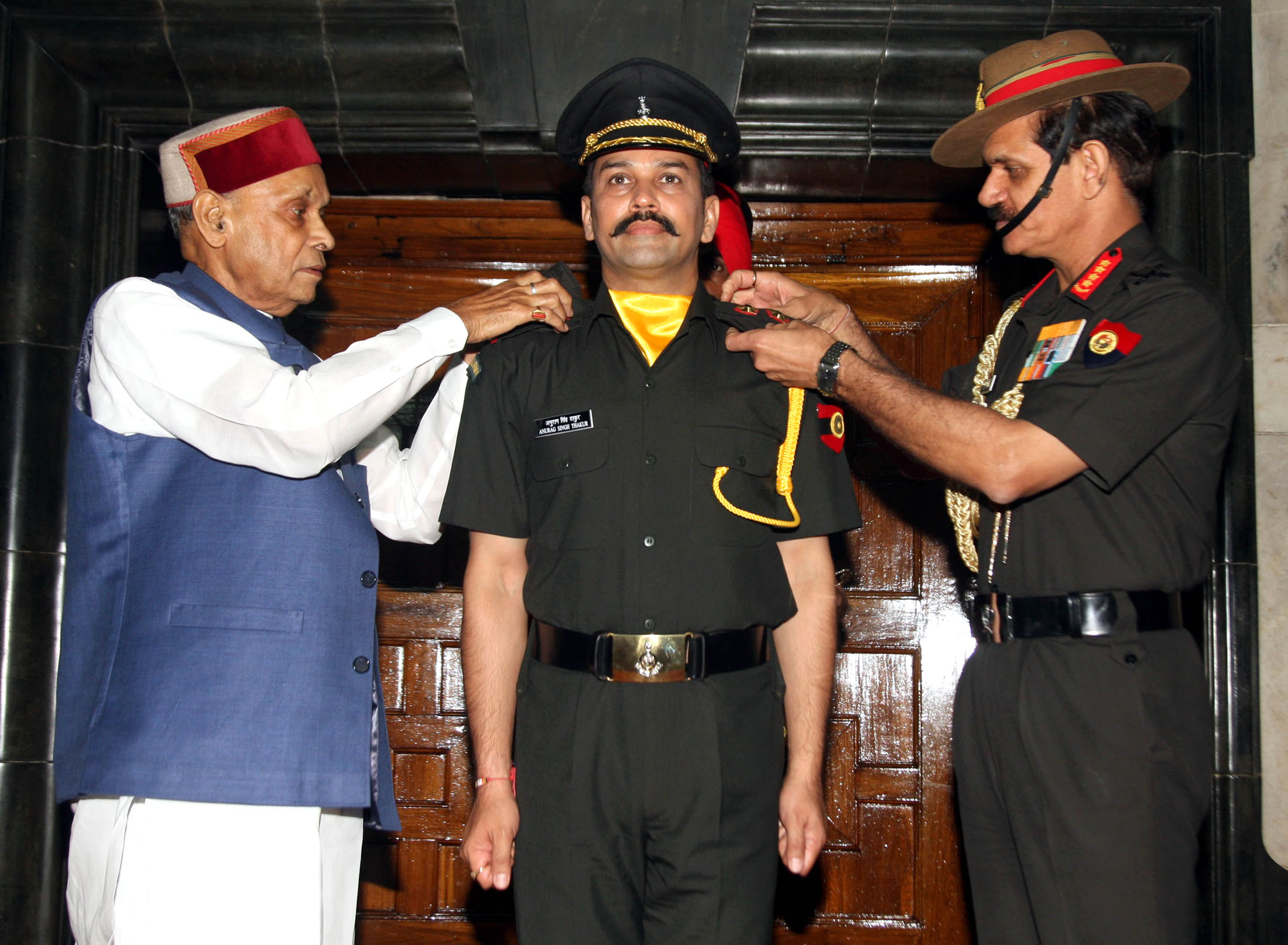
The Chief of Army Staff General Dalbir Singh conferring the rank of Lieutenant in the TA on Anurag Thakur in 2016.

== See also ==
- National Cadet Corps
