= Mahar Regiment =

Regiment of the Indian Army

- Mahar Regiment Insignia
- Active: 1941 – present
- Country: India
- Branch: Indian Army
- Type: Line Infantry
- Role: Infantry
- Size: 22 battalions
- Regimental Centre: Sagar, Madhya Pradesh
- Mottos: Yash Sidhi; Success & Attainment
- War cry: Bolo Hindustan Ki Jai; Say Victory to India
- Decorations: 1 Param Vir Chakra; 1 Ashok Chakra; 9 PVSM; 4 Maha Vir Chakra; 5 Kirti Chakra; 1 Padma Shri; 3 UYSM; 16 AVSM; 32 Vir Chakra; 39 Shaurya Chakra; 4 Yudh Seva Medal; 221 Sena Medal; 49 Vishisht Seva Medal; 107 M-in-D (Mentioned in dispatches); 2 Jeevan Raksha Padak

Commanders
- Current commander: Lieutenant General Sandeep Jain, SM
- Notable commanders: General K. V. Krishna Rao, PVSM; General Krishnaswamy Sundarji, PVSM

The Mahar Regiment is an infantry regiment of the Indian Army. Although it was originally intended to be a regiment consisting of troops from the Mahar community of Maharashtra. At present, the Mahar Regiment is composed of different communities from mainly states like Maharashtra, Gujarat, Madhya Pradesh, Uttar Pradesh, and Bihar.

== History ==
=== Overview ===
The Mahar community of Maharashtra, also known as Kathiwale (men with sticks), Bumiputera (sons of the soil), and Mirasi (landlords), by tradition has the role of defending village boundaries from outsiders, invading tribes, criminals, and thieves. They were also responsible for maintaining law and order throughout the villages as administrators.

Mahar served in various armies over several centuries. Under Islamic rule, Mahars served as soldiers in various armies of the Deccan Sultanates, Bahmani Sultanate, and the Mughals. It is recorded that the Moghuls too trusted the Mahars and, because of their unfailing loyalty, sharp eye, and courage, brought them to Panhala where they were used by Aurangzeb as guards for his daughter who lived in the fortress.

The Maratha king Shivaji Maharaj recruited a number of them into his army in the 17th century. They served as guards in hill forts and as soldiers. The Mahar along with the Koli and Marathas defended the fort of Purandar from Dilirkhan's Moghul army in 1665. Later during Peshwa rule Shidnak mahar saved the life of his commander Parshurambhau Patwardhan during the Battle of Kharda in 1795.

During the colonial period, large numbers of Mahars were recruited for military duties by the East India Company and the British Raj. The Battle of Koregaon (1 January 1818) is commemorated by an obelisk known as the Koregaon pillar, which was erected at the site of the battle in 1821 and by a medal issued in 1851. The pillar featured on the Mahar Regiment crest until the Independence of India; it is inscribed with the names of 22 Mahars killed at the battle. The victory pillar serves as focal point of Mahar heroism.

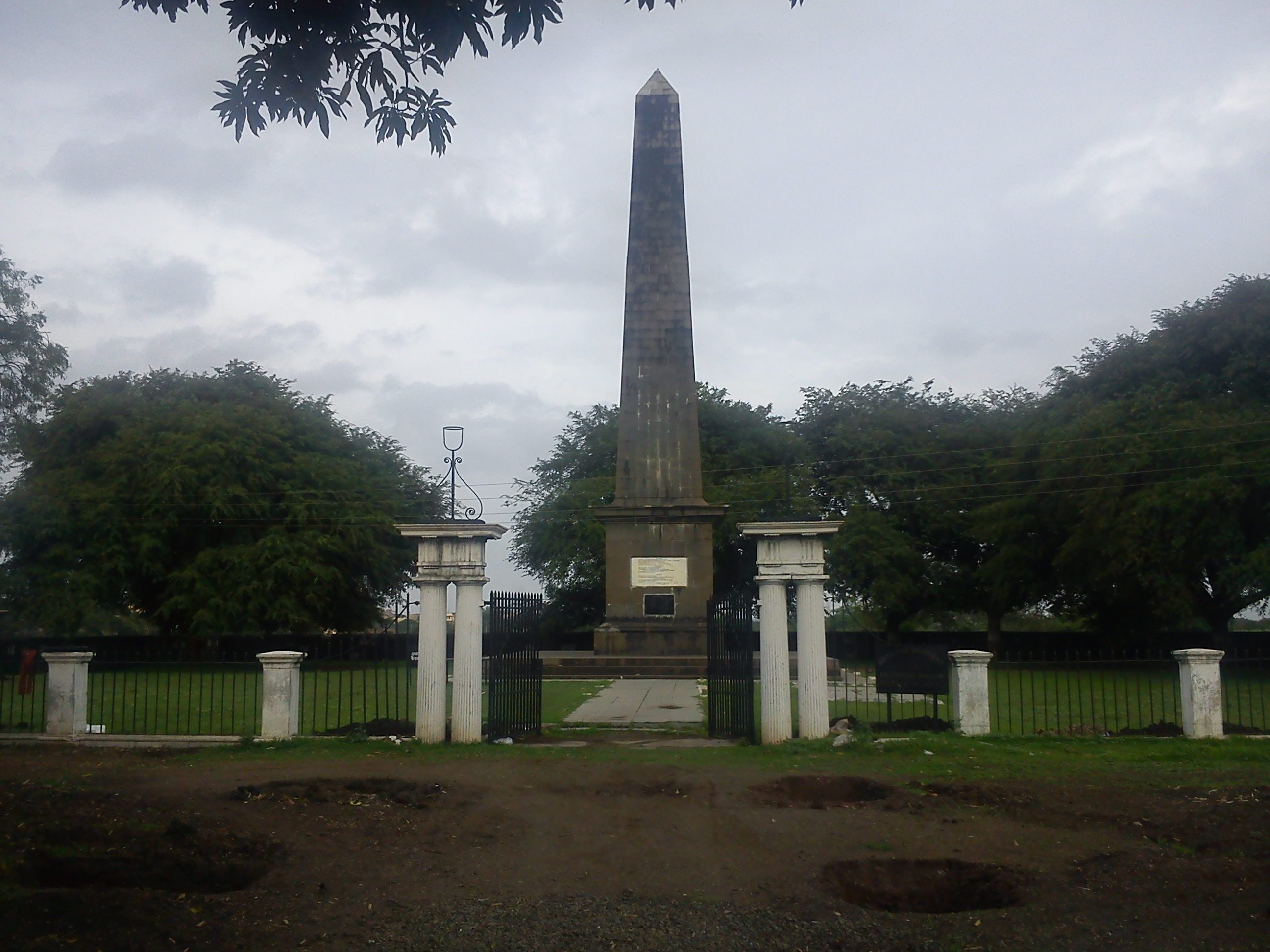
Bhima Koregaon Victory Pillar

The Mahar began their service to the East India company around 1750. Between 20 and 25 per cent of the British Bombay Army were Mahars. Their conduct as soldiers was praised by many British officers. Mahars were a vital component of the British Marine Battalion. In the East India Company Army they participated in various wars including Second Anglo-Maratha War, Third Anglo-Maratha War, Second Anglo-Sikh War and Second Afghan War.

After the 1857 mutiny, the British decided to change their military recruitment policy. One report "emphasized that we cannot practically ignore it (the caste system), so long as the natives socially maintain it". This led to the discrimination against the Mahars, other low-caste and some unreliable Brahmin castes.The new policy selectively favoured recruitment of Sikhs, Dogras, Rajputs, Jats as well as the Gurkha of Nepal.

=== Martial races theory and disbandment ===
After the Revolt of 1857, the British officers of the Indian Army, particularly those who had served in the First and Second Afghan Wars, began to give currency to the Martial Races Theory. This theory was that some races and communities among Indians were naturally warlike, and more suited to warfare than others. A major proponent of this theory was Lord Roberts, who became Commander-in-Chief of the Indian Army in the November 1885. There was a gradual "Punjabisation" of the Indian Army to the detriment of the other communities. The final blow for the Mahar troops came in 1892, when it was decided to institute "class regiments" in the Indian Army. The Mahars were not included in these class regiments, and it was notified that the Mahars, among with some other classes, were no longer to be recruited in the Indian army. The Mahar troops were demobilised. This event was regarded by the Mahars as a betrayal of their loyalty by a government they had served for over a hundred years.

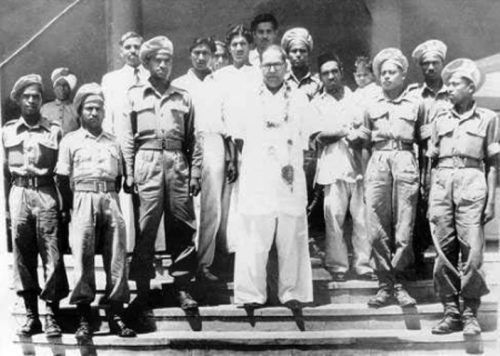
Dr Babasaheb Ambedkar with members of the Mahar regiment in 1950.

=== Raising of the Mahar Regiment ===
When in 1892 the Government of India issued orders banning the recruitment of the Mahars in the Indian Army, Subhedar Ramji Sakpal took a leading part in protesting against these unjust orders and approached the ever- helping Ranade to draft a petition appealing to the Government of India to rescind the unjust orders. A few years later, Bhim came across a copy of this petition in the bundle of his father's old papers. There were many attempts by the leaders of the Mahar community to persuade the Government to let them serve in the Army once again. Petitions to this effect were drafted by ex-soldiers such as Gopal Baba Walangkar in 1894 with the help of Mahadev Govind Ranade, and Shivram Janba Kamble in 1904. These petitions were supported in principle by the politician and social reformer Gopal Krishna Gokhale, who was opposed to the Martial Races theory. They were also supported by the Indian National Congress, who were also opposed to the recruiting policies of the Army. The shortage of men at the outbreak of the First World War in 1914 forced the Government to begin more broad-based recruiting, and the Mahars were at last allowed to enlist in the Army. One battalion of Mahar troops, the 111th Mahars was raised in the June 1917. However, the battalion did not see much service during the War, and in 1920 it was merged with the 71st Punjabis and was disbanded in March 1921.

World War II forced the British to broaden their recruitment and the Mahar Regiment was raised in 1941. In that year B. R. Ambedkar was appointed to the Defence Advisory Committee of the Viceroy's Executive Council. He also encouraged Mahars to join the Army. In October, the Army gave in, and the 1st battalion of the Mahar Regiment was raised in Belgaum under Lieutenant Colonel H.J.R. Jackson of the 13th Frontier Force Rifles and Subedar Major Sheikh Hassnuddin. The 2nd battalion was raised in Kamptee in June 1942 under Lieutenant Colonel J.W.K. Kirwan and Subedar Major Bholaji Ranjane. A cap badge was designed for the regiment by Captain E.E.L. Mortlemans, an officer of the 2nd battalion. The badge featured the Koregaon Pillar over the word "Mahar". The third battalion, the 25th Mahars, was raised in Belgaum in the August 1942 by Lieutenant Colonel V. Chambier and Subedar Major Sardar Bahadur Ladkojirao Bhonsale, and the 3rd Mahars were raised in Nowshera by Lieutenant Colonel R.N.D. Frier and Subedar Major Bholaji Ranjane.

In 1946, the 25th Mahars were disbanded, along with many other garrison battalions of the Indian Army. Its officers and men were largely absorbed by the other three battalions of the regiment. In the October 1946, the regiment was converted into a machine gun regiment, and the regimental centre was established at Kamptee. Following the conversion, the cap badge was changed. The new badge had two crossed Vickers machine guns over the Koregaon Pillar, over a scroll that said "The Mahar MG Regiment". The three surviving battalions of the regiment served as a part of the Punjab Boundary Force, and took part in escorting refugees during the Partition of India.

=== Border Scouts ===
The Border Scouts were an irregular force formed by the people of the border villages in East Punjab during Partition. Hailing as they did from the erstwhile greater state of East Punjab (which included the present states of Haryana and Himachal Pradesh), the force had people hailing from a greater mix of ethnic, religious and caste backgrounds than was the norm in the Indian Army. They did some useful work defending villages from attacks during partition, and as a reward, were given a more permanent character as the East Punjab Frontier Scouts in 1948. They served along the border with Pakistan as border guards, and were regarded as a useful adjunct of the Punjab Armed Police. The unit was redesignated the 1st, 2nd and 3rd Battalions of the Border Scouts in 1951, with recruitment from different North Indian communities. In 1956, the decision to convert this force into Machine-Gun Regiments was taken, and the three battalions were merged with the Mahar Regiment, the only Indian Machine Gun Regiment in existence at the time. They joined the Regiment as the 4th, 5th and 6th Battalions of the Mahar Regiment, and it is to these units that the Regiment traces its mixed-class composition. The three Battalions style themselves battalions of the Mahar Regiment (Borders) even today.

== Class composition ==
Six battalions are of pure Mahars (1, 2, 3, 7, 8 and 13), one battalion has troops from border regions and the balance units are on all India mixed class basis.

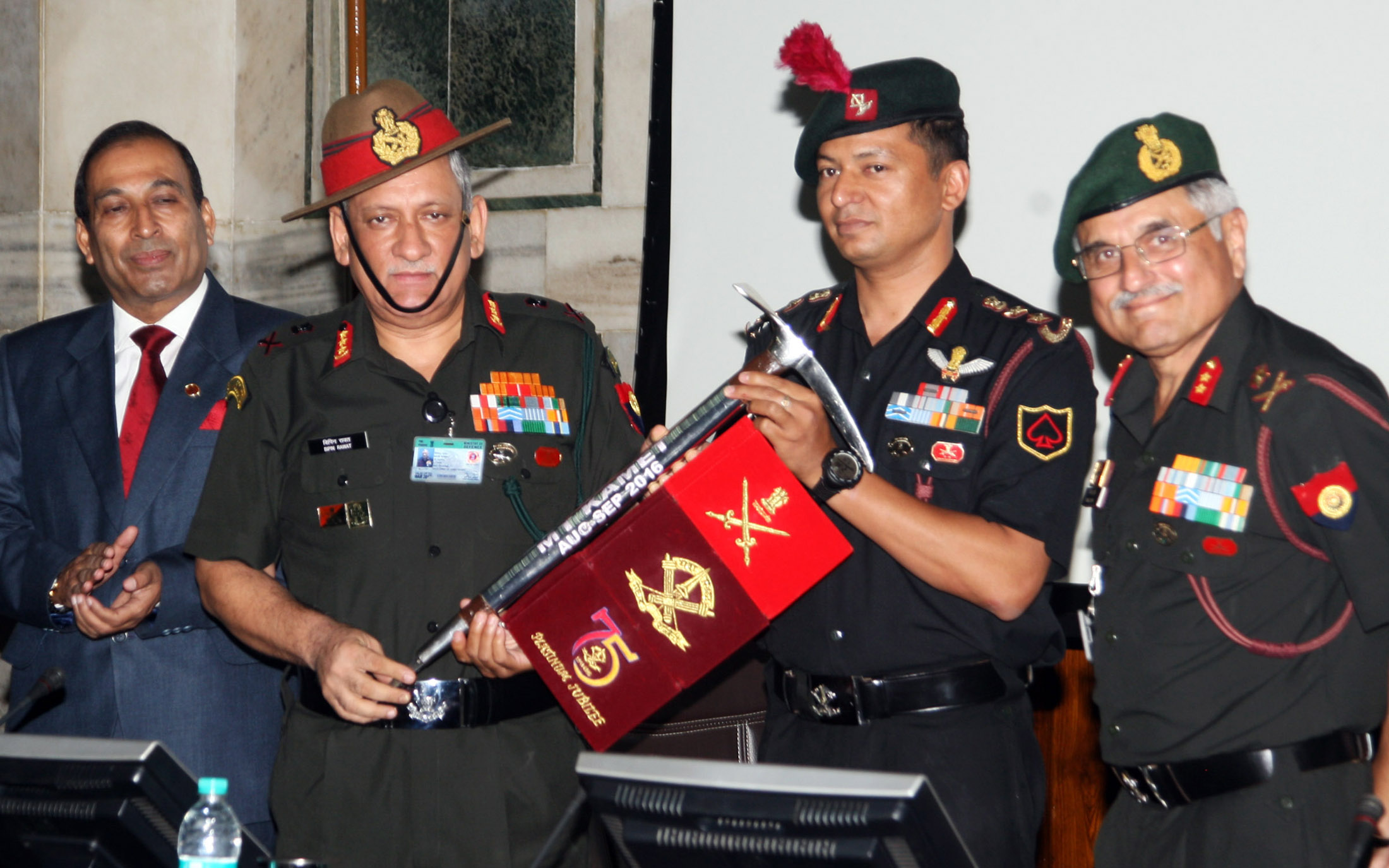
General Bipin Rawat receiving the expedition flag before the Mahar Regiment Mount Kamet Expedition, 2016

== Mahar Regimental Centre ==
The Mahar Regimental Centre is the training and administrative hub of the Mahar Regiment. It was initially established as Training Company at Kamptee, Maharashtra on 1 October 1942. The company was subsequently expanded to the Mahar Training Battalion in June 1943. When the regiment adopted a machine-gun role, it became the Mahar Machine Gun Regimental Centre on 1 October 1946. The centre was relocated to Arangaon (near Ahmednagar) and finally to its present location at Saugor in Madhya Pradesh in 1948. Once it reverted to a regular infantry role, the centre got its present designation. The Mahar Regimental Museum is also located in the centre.

== Regimental Insignia and Traditions ==
Regimental Crest

The crest of the 111 Mahars had the a curved title with the word "MAHARS", mounted by the numeral 111. Between 1942 and 1946, the regimental crest of the Mahar Regiment featured the Koregaon pillar with a scroll bearing the battle honour, 'KORE' and 'GAON', with the unit title, 'MAHAR' below. In 1946, as the regiment was converted into a machine gun regiment, the new crest had a pair of crossed Vickers medium machine guns, mounted on a tripod and the Koregaon pillar in the centre. A scroll above had the words 'KORE' and 'GAON'. A scroll below had the words "THE MAHAR REGIMENT" and "M.G." in the centre. In 1947, the Koregaon pillar was replaced with a katar dagger facing upwards. In the upper scroll, KOREGAON was replaced with the regimental motto in Devanagari. When the regiment became a regular infantry regiment in 1963–64, the initial M.G. were removed.

Uniform

The present uniform of the Mahar Regiment includes a maroon lanyard on the left shoulder and the shoulder title MAHAR REGT in an arc. The green beret (common to all infantry units in India) has the regimental crest on a diamond base stitched to the beret and a dull cherry hackle. From 1969, the shoulder titles and badges of rank have a flash backing.

Regimental motto and war cry

The regimental motto is 'Yash Sidhi' (यश् सिद्धि), which translates to 'success and attainment'. The war cry is 'Bolo Hindustan Ki Jai' (बोलो हिंदुस्तान की जय), which means 'Say Victory to India'.

Regimental march

The regimental march is Deshon ka Sartaj Bharat (देशों का सरताज भारत).

== Operations ==
World War II

During the Second World War, the 1st and 3rd Mahars served in the North-West Frontier Province, while the 2nd and 25th were employed on internal security duties within the country. The 2nd battalion also saw service in the Burma Campaign as a part of the 23rd Indian Division, where they suffered 5 casualties and had one officer mentioned in dispatches. They also served in Iraq after the war as a part of Persia and Iraq Force (PAI Force).

Partition of India

During the partition of India, units of the Mahar regiment were deployed to protect refugees during the riots.

India–Pakistan war of 1947–1948

During the war in Kashmir, the machine gun detachments of the Mahar regiment took active part in operations. They were awarded one Maha Vir Chakra, five Vir Chakras and thirteen mentioned in dispatches along with the theatre honour Jammu and Kashmir.

Custodian Force of India (Korea)

One company of 3 Mahar Regiment was part of the Custodian Force of India during the Korean War.

United Nation peacekeeping operations

- One company each of 3 Mahar and 4 Mahar (Borders) - United Nations Operation in the Congo (ONUC) - 1961
- 5 Mahar (Borders) - United Nations Operation in Somalia II (UNOSOM II) - 1993
- 13 Mahar - United Nations Mission in Sudan (UNMIS) - 2010

Operation Vijay

During the annexation of Goa, C company, 7 Mahar MG as part of 63 Infantry Brigade; the Independent Para Company Mahar MG (Borders) as part of 50 (Independent) Parachute Brigade and A company, 7 Mahar MG as part of 48 Infantry Brigade - the reserve brigade, took part in the operations. The Independent Para Company was part of the first troops which entered the capital on 19 December 1961.

Sino-Indian War

During the Chinese aggression, machine gun detachments of 1, 6 and 7 Mahar took part in operations in Sikkim and North-East Frontier Agency.

India–Pakistan war of 1965

Mahar units took part in operations in Kutch, Chammb (3 Mahar), Akhnoor (9 Mahar), Khemkaran (2 Mahar) and Sialkot (10 Mahar) sectors.

India–Pakistan war of 1971

2 Mahar saw action in Naya Chor, 1 Mahar in Shakargarh, 6 Mahar in Sehjra Salient Sector, whereas 10 and 15 Mahar (then 32 Mahar) took part in operations in the eastern sector.

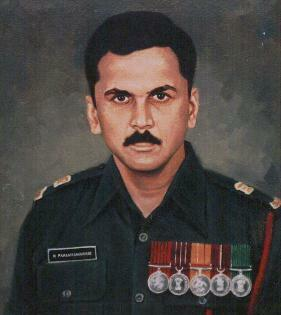
Major R Parameshwaran, PVC

Operation Pawan

4, 8, 13, and 19 Mahar along with 108 TA battalion took part in operations in Sri Lanka as part of the Indian Peace Keeping Force. During this operation, Major Ramaswamy Parameswaran (8 Mahar) was posthumously awarded the Param Vir Chakra, India's highest military decoration, for his bravery. Late on 25 November 1987, when a column of the Mahar Regiment under Major Parameswaran was returning from a search operation, it was ambushed by a group of militants armed with five rifles. In response, Parameswaran encircled the militants from the rear and charged into them, taking them completely surprise. In the ensuing hand-to-hand combat, a militant shot Parameswaran in the chest. Undaunted, he snatched the rifle from the militant and shot him dead. Gravely wounded, he continued to give orders and inspired his command until he died. Five militants were killed and three rifles and two rocket launchers were recovered and the ambush was cleared. Parameswaran.

== Units ==
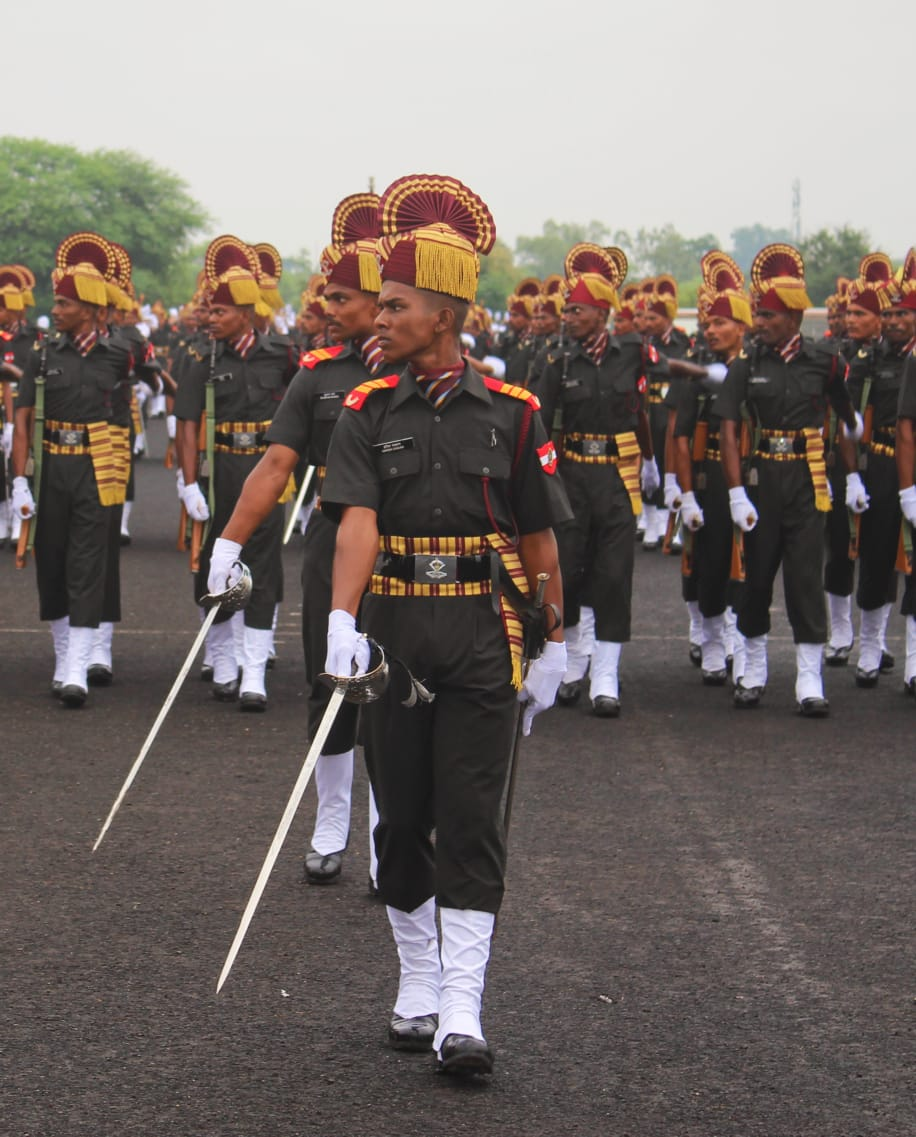
Mahar Regiment passing out parade, September 2021

The Mahar Regiment consists of twenty-one regular battalions, three Territorial Army units and three Rashtriya Rifles battalions -

Battalion	Raising Date	Remarks	References
1st Battalion	1 October 1941	Raised in Belgaum under Lieutenant Colonel HJR Jackson. Theatre honours Jammu & Kashmir 1947-48, Ladakh 1962 and Punjab 1971 and battle honour Harar Kalan.	
2nd Battalion	1 June 1942	Raised in the Outram Lines at Kamptee under Lieutenant Colonel JWK Kirwan. Converted into a Medium Machine Gun Battalion in October1946, re-converted into a standard infantry battalion in 1964. Battle honours Asal Uttar and Parbat Ali, theatre honours Punjab 1965 and Rajasthan & Sindh 1971.	
3rd Battalion	1 November 1943	Raised in Nowshera by Lieutenant Colonel RND Frier MC. Converted into a machine gun battalion on 1 October 1946 in Pune, now a regular infantry battalion. Battle honour Kalidhar and theatre honour Jammu and Kashmir.	
4th Battalion (Borders)	8 May 1948	Raised as 1st battalion, East Punjab Frontier Scouts under Major PS Bajwa. Designated 1st Border Scouts on 1 February 1951. Converted into the Mahar Regiment on 30 April 1956 as 4th Battalion, the Mahar MG Regiment (BORDERS). In 1964, it became a Standard Infantry Battalion.	
5th Battalion (Borders)	23 March 1948	Raised at Amritsar under Major Tirath Singh as 2nd battalion, East Punjab Frontier Scouts. Redesignated as 2nd Border Scouts and then 5 Mahar on 4 June 1956. The battalion actively participated in operations and wars like Recapture of Pul Kanjari 1948, Sino-Indian war 1962, Indo-Pak war 1965, Indo-Pak war 1971, Operation Battle Axe in Mizoram 1982-84 and UNOSOM II. The Battalion earned GOC-in-C Eastern Command Unit Citation in year 2015 for outstanding performance in East Sikkim.The battalion has earned 1 PVSM, 1 Vir Chakra, 7 Shaurya Chakras, 15 Sena Medals, 1 YSM, 1 VSM, 37 COAS Commendation Cards, 3 VCOAS Commendation Cards, 57 GOC in C Commendation Cards.	
6th Battalion (Borders)	20 April 1948	Raised as 2nd East Punjab Militia under Major Narain Singh at Ferozepur. Converted into the 3rd Border Scouts and then to Mahar Regiment under Lieutenant Colonel Kartar Singh in May 1956 as 6th Battalion, the Mahar MG Regiment (BORDERS). In May 1964, it became a Standard Infantry Battalion. Battle honour Sehjra and theatre honour Punjab 1971 during operations in Khemkaran Sector in the 1971 war. COAS Unit Citation during Operation Parakram in Jammu & Kashmir in 2004.	
7th Battalion	1959	Raised as a Machine Gun Battalion at Saugor, under Lieutenant Colonel BM Bali, re-converted into a standard infantry battalion in 1964.	
8th Battalion	1 March 1962	Raised as a Machine Gun Battalion at Saugor, under Lieutenant Colonel KL Joseph. Was converted to a standard infantry battalion in 1964.	
9th Battalion	1 October 1962	Raised as a Machine Gun Battalion at Saugor, under Lieutenant Colonel VN Limaye. Was converted to a standard infantry battalion on 30 April 1964. Battle honour Jaurian Kalit and theatre honour Jammu and Kashmir, 1965.	
10th Battalion	15 November 1962	Raised as a Machine Gun Battalion at Saugor with a mixed class composition, was converted to a standard infantry battalion on 1 September 1963. Battle honours Tilakpur-Muhadipur and Shamsher Nagar, theatre honours Punjab 1965 and East Pakistan 1971.	
11th Battalion	1 October 1964	Raised at Saugor under Lieutenant Colonel MS Pawar. Initially a fixed class unit having 25% of Gujarati, Bengali, Odiya and other India caste. Changed in April 2006 to 80% all India all caste and 20% Mahar. Theatre Honour Jammu and Kashmir, 1965.	
12nd Battalion	1 January 1965	Raised at Saugor under Lieutenant Colonel IP Singh.	
13th Battalion	15 January 1966	Raised at Saugor under Lieutenant Colonel NB Singh. Battle honour Thanpir and theatre honour Jammu & Kashmir. COAS unit citation in 1999 for Operation Rhino. Force Commander UNMIS unit citation in 2000.	
14th Battalion	15 January 1968	Raised as 31 Mahar Regiment at Saugor by Lieutenant Colonel NK Jaitly for internal security duties in Nagaland and Mizo Hills. Redesignated 14 Mahar on 1 April 1971. COAS Unit Citation during tenure in Batalik sector.	
15th Battalion	8 January 1970	Raised as 32 Mahar Regiment at Saugor by Lieutenant Colonel Hargobind Singh for internal security duties in Nagaland and Mizo Hills. First regiment to be composed entirely of hill tribes. Converted to a regular infantry battalion in August 1972 and designated as 15 Mahar.	
16th Battalion §	01 January 1965	Raised as 8th Parachute Regiment, converted to Mahar battalion in 1975, converted to 12th Mechanised Infantry in 1981.	
17th Battalion	1 July 1979		
18th Battalion	1 January 1981	Raised at Saugor by Lieutenant Colonel Henry Bhasker.	
19th Battalion	11 February 1985	Raised at Saugor by Lieutenant Colonel Pradeep Kala.	
20th Battalion			
21st Battalion			
22nd Battalion			
25th Battalion §	August 1942	Raised at Belgaum as a garrison battalion by Lieutenant Colonel V Chambier. Disbanded in 1946.	
108 Infantry Battalion (TA)	1 October 1960	Raised at Jodhpur as a provincial unit affiliated to the Rajputana Rifles. Subsequently, on 1 April 1966, the unit was affiliated to the Mahar Regiment.	
115 Infantry Battalion (TA)	1 November 1960	Located at Belgaum, Karnataka.	
136 Infantry Battalion TA (Ecological)	9 December 2017	Based in Aurangabad, Maharashtra. It is a specialised Army Departmental Ecological Battalion raised primarily to improve the green cover in arid Marathwada region, on request and funding by Government of Maharashtra.	
1 Rashtriya Rifles	1 October 1990	Raised by Lieutenant Colonel AK Bakshi at Rajputana Rifles Regimental Centre at New Delhi. Affiliated to the Mahar Regiment in 1994. COAS Unit Citation in 2006.	
30 Rashtriya Rifles			
51 Rashtriya Rifles			

§ indicates former units.

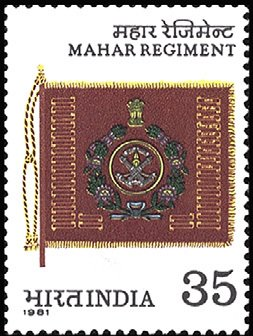
Postal stamp on the 40th anniversary of the presentation of the Regimental Colours, 1981

=== Allied units ===
Special Task Force (STF)

- 21 Special Task Force (STF)

== Affiliation ==
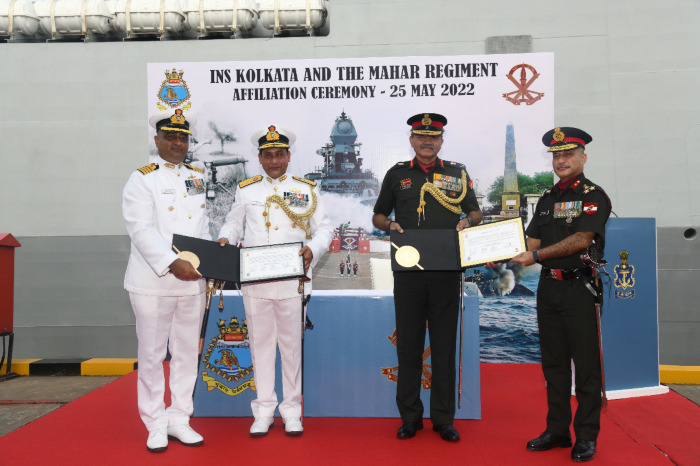
Affiliation between INS Kolkata and Mahar Regiment, May 2022

- INS Kolkata, the lead ship of the Kolkata-class stealth guided-missile destroyers of the Indian Navy was affiliated to the Mahar Regiment on 26 May 2022 at the Naval Dockyard in Mumbai.
- The Mahar Regiment is affiliated to the 8 Squadron of the Indian Air Force. The affiliation was formally signed at Air Force Station, Bareilly on 19 December 2022.

== Awards and decorations ==
The Mahar Regiment has won the following honours-

Battle honours

Asal Uttar, Jaurain Kalit, Kalidhar, Tilakpur-Muhadipur, Sehjra, Harar Kalan, Parbat Ali, Thanpir and Shamsher Nagar.

Theatre honours

Jammu & Kashmir 1947–48, Punjab 1947–48, Ladakh 1962, Punjab 1965, Jammu and Kashmir 1965, Rajasthan & Sindh 1971, Punjab 1971, East Pakistan 1971 and Jammu and Kashmir 1971.

Gallantry awards

- Param Vir Chakra - 1 (Major Ramaswamy Parameswaran, 8 Mahar ϯ)
- Ashoka Chakra - 1 (Subedar Suresh Chand Yadav, 13 Mahar/NSG ϯ)
- Maha Vir Chakra – 4 (Naik Krishna Sonawane, 1 Mahar ϯ, Sepoy Ansuya Prasad,10 Mahar ϯ, Major Puttichanda Somaiah Ganapathi, 8 Mahar, Lieutenant Colonel Gurbans Singh Sangha)
- Kirti Chakra – 5 (Havildar Pawan Kumar Yadav, 21 Mahar ϯ, Naik Tarlok Singh, 30 RR, Naib Subedar Rajesh Kumar, 30 RR ϯ, Sepoy Janjal Pravin Prabhakar, 1 RR ϯ)
- Padma Shri - 1
- Vir Chakra - 32
- Shaurya Chakra - 39
- Sena Medal - 221
- Param Vishisht Seva Medal - 9
- Uttam Yudh Seva Medal - 3
- Ati Vishisht Seva Medal - 16
- Yudh Seva Medal - 4
- Vishisht Seva Medal - 49
- Jeevan Raksha Padak - 2
- Mention-in-Despatches - 107

ϯ indicates that the award was given posthumously.

== Notable Officers ==
- General Kotikalapudi Venkata Krishna Rao PVSM : 1981–83
- General Krishnaswamy Sundarji PVSM : 1986–88
- Lieutenant General Biddanda Chengappa Nanda PVSM, AVSM - GOC-in-C of Northern Command : 1987–89
- Lieutenant General Gyan Bhushan PVSM, UYSM, AVSM, VSM - GOC-in-C of South Western Command : 2011–13
- Lieutenant General Sandeep Jain AVSM, SM - GOC-in-C of Southern Command : 2026-date

== See also ==
- List of regiments of the Indian Army
