= 37 Field Regiment (India) =

37 (Coorg) Field Regiment
- Active: 1794 – 1946 (as an infantry unit); 1946 – present (as an artillery unit)
- Allegiance: British India; India
- Branch: British Indian Army; Indian Army
- Type: Artillery
- Size: Regiment
- Motto(s): Sarvatra, Izzat-O-Iqbal (Everywhere with Honour and Glory); Now or never
- Colors: Red & Navy Blue
- Anniversaries: 18 October – Raising day

Insignia
- Abbreviation: 37 Fd Regt

37 (Coorg) Field Regiment is part of the Regiment of Artillery of the Indian Army.

== Formation and history ==
The regiment traces its origins to 18 October 1794, when the present-day 4th Battalion of the Madras Regiment was raised by Captain E Tolfry as 33rd Madras Native Infantry. Its successor unit, the 1st (Territorial) Battalion of 83rd Wallajahabad Light Infantry became 14/3rd Madras Regiment in 1922; 14th Battalion, 1st Madras Pioneers in 1928, 14th Coorg Battalion in 1929 and 1st Coorg Battalion in 1942. 14th Coorg Battalion recruited men from the Kodavas or the Coorgies community. The Coorgies are a martial community concentrated in present-day Kodagu district of Karnataka.

1st Coorg Battalion was raised as a garrison battalion by converting the 14th Coorg Battalion, Indian Territorial Force on 1 June 1942. Like the former infantry unit from Coorg, the 71st Coorg Rifles, it had a badge incorporating crossed Coorg knives. It performed internal security duties in the Deccan area through March 1945. The unit was sent to Burma and became Army Troops in the Arakan in March 1945. From May 1945 to August 1945, it served under No. 1 Area, Rangoon under the Headquarters, 12th Army. On 31 July 1946, the infantry unit was converted to an artillery unit and named 10th Indian Anti-Tank Regiment RIA at Secunderabad. On 10 February 1947, it was re-designated as 37 Coorg Anti-Tank Regiment RIA. Following the partition of India, the regiment was allotted to the Indian Army. The regiment was converted to 37 (Coorg) Heavy Mortar Regiment on 11 April 1956; to 37 (Coorg) Light Regiment (Towed) on 11 April 1965; to 37 (Coorg) Medium Regiment on 16 March 1973, and finally designated a field regiment on 13 July 2006. It presently consists of 41, 42 and 43 field batteries.

== Operations ==
The regiment has taken part in the following operations -

Pre-independence

- The predecessor units took part in Fourth Anglo-Mysore War in 1799 (battle honour Seringapatnam 1799), Third Anglo-Maratha War (battle honour Nagpore), Third Anglo-Burmese War (battle honour Burma 1885-1887), World War I in East Africa and Persia and World War II in Burma.

Post-independence

- Operation Holi – In support of 167 Infantry Brigade in 1956, for the defence of Hussainiwala headworks.
- Indo-Pakistani War of 1965 – 37 Light Regiment was part of 19 Infantry Division under 15 Corps in Jammu and Kashmir. During Operation Ablaze, the unit was in support of 161 Infantry Brigade in Hajipir sector and 104 Infantry Brigade in Tangdhar sector. The regiment lost Gunner G K Palathingal during the operations.
- Indo-Pakistani War of 1971 – 37 Light Regiment was part of 26 Artillery Brigade under 26 Infantry Division. It was equipped with 120 mm mortars and saw action in the Jammu sector near the Chicken's Neck and Navapind. The regiment lost Gunner Nagappa during the operations.
- Operation Trident – 1986–1987 in Rajasthan sector under 14 Infantry Division of 2 Corps.
- Operation Rakshak – Counter terrorism operations in Punjab between 1991 and 1992.
- Operation Vijay – Jammu and Kashmir sector, 1999.
- Operation Parakram – Rajasthan sector, 2001.
- Operation Rakshak – Batalik sector, Jammu and Kashmir in 2006.

== Equipment ==
The regiment has used the following weapon systems, since it has become an artillery regiment -

- 1946 – 6-pounder anti-tank guns
- 1956 – 4.2-inch mortar
- 1965 – 120 mm mortar
- 1973 – M-46 130 mm guns
- 2006 – Indian Field Gun

== Gallantry awards ==
The regiment has won the following gallantry awards–

- Kirti Chakra – Major Kumandur Prabhakar Vinay – was posthumously awarded the gallantry award, when he was on deputation from the unit to 34 Rashtriya Rifles.

== Class composition and culture ==
During its early years, the regiment had recruits only from the Kodava community from Coorg. With a fall in numbers, the unit now consists of soldiers from all four south Indian states. Despite the low number of recruits from Coorg in the present day, the unit maintains a lot of traditions linked to the community. They include –

- The official residence of the commanding officer of the unit is called Mercara house, named after the Mercara town (present day Madikeri ) in the Coorg.
- On the regiment's raising day, all officers and non-commissioned officers of the unit wear the traditional dress – Kupya Chale. The Kupya is a collarless, thick, short-sleeved, knee length coat and the Chale is a maroon gold-embroidered silk sash which is worn around the waist to secure the Kupya.
- During ceremonial functions, the officers wear a Pichangatti or Peeche Kathi, which is an ornamental dagger indigenous to the Kodava community. The Pichangatti is usually tucked under the chale. When a new commanding officer takes over, the Pichangatti is handed over as a sign of change in command (instead of the ‘Change of Baton’ as practiced in other artillery units).
- The ladies of the regiment wear Kodava Podiya or the Kodagu style of draping of the saree.
- The unit as part of its tradition takes part in the annual hockey tournament in Kodagu.

== War cry ==
The river Cauvery is an integral part of the Kodava culture. Kodagu is the birthplace of Cauvery, a river that local Kodavas consider sacred, and thus reflected in its war cry. The war cry of the regiment is कावेरी माता की जय (Cauvery Mata ki Jai) which translates to Hail Mother Cauvery.

== Affiliation ==
The 37 Field Regiment (Coorg) was affiliated with Madras Regiment in 2014.

== Notable officers ==
- General Om Prakash Malhotra PVSM – Commanded the unit between 17 November 1950 and 22 November 1951. Became the 10th Chief of Army Staff of the Indian Army.
- Lieutenant General KK Nanda – Commissioned into the regiment in 1950 and went on to become Chief of Staff, Central Command and Colonel Commandant, Remount Veterinary Corps.

== See also ==
- List of artillery regiments of Indian Army
- 71st Coorg Rifles
