= 71st Coorg Rifles =

- Active: 1767 – 1904
- Country: British India
- Branch: British Indian Army
- Type: Infantry
- Part of: Madras Army (1757 – 1895); Madras Command (1895 – 1908)
- Uniform: Red; faced, 1853 dark green, 1882 green, 1891 emerald green 1903 green; faced scarlet
- Engagements: Third Anglo-Mysore War

The 71st Coorg Rifles was an infantry regiment of the British Indian Army. Established in 1767, it had a long history as a Madrasi unit but in 1902 enlistment was changed in an attempt to trial the employment of Coorg tribesmen in the Indian Army.

== Early history ==
Until 1901 the regiment was designated as the 11th Madras Infantry. In 1902 the regiment was reorganised and the basis of recruitment changed from Tamil and Telugu to Coorg soldiers. The Coorgs had not previously been recruited into the Indian Army and this conversion was seen as a test of both their availability and suitability for military service. The origins of the regiment could be traced to 1767, when it was raised as the 15th Battalion Coast Sepoys. The regiment served in the Third Anglo-Mysore War but saw no more active service during the nineteenth century.

== Establishment as Coorg regiment ==
The restructured regiment was renamed the 71st Coorg Rifles in 1903, and given dark green uniforms with scarlet facings. Red fezzes, which were an unusual item of uniform in the Indian Army, are reported to have been worn by the sepoys. Subsequently described as "an-out-of-the-run unit" and "an experiment that failed", they were disbanded in 1904 because of insufficient recruits. The mess funds and silver were bequeathed to the newly raised 2/9th Gurkha Rifles.

== Subsequent recruitment ==
During World War I the rapid expansion of the Indian Army led to a further attempt to enlist members of the Coorg community. No attempt was made to recreate a class regiment but 700 Coorgs were recruited for service in various southern Indian units. Surveys indicated that there were only 4,000 Coorg males of military age at that time.

In 1942 Coorgs were again recruited, into the newly raised 1st Coorg Battalion. Like the 71st Coorg Rifles, the new battalion had a badge incorporating crossed Coorg knives. In 1946 it was converted to the 37 (Coorg) Anti-Tank Regiment Unit of the Royal Indian Artillery. It is now a part of the modern Indian Regiment of Artillery.

== Predecessor names ==
- 15th Battalion Coast Sepoys – 1767
- 11th Coorg Infantry – 1902
- 71st Coorg Rifles – 1903

== See also ==
- 71st Punjabis

== Bibliography ==
- Barthorp, Michael; Burn, Jeffrey (1979). Indian infantry regiments 1860-1914. Osprey Publishing. ISBN 0-85045-307-0.
