= Deepak Rao =

Indian combat trainer and author

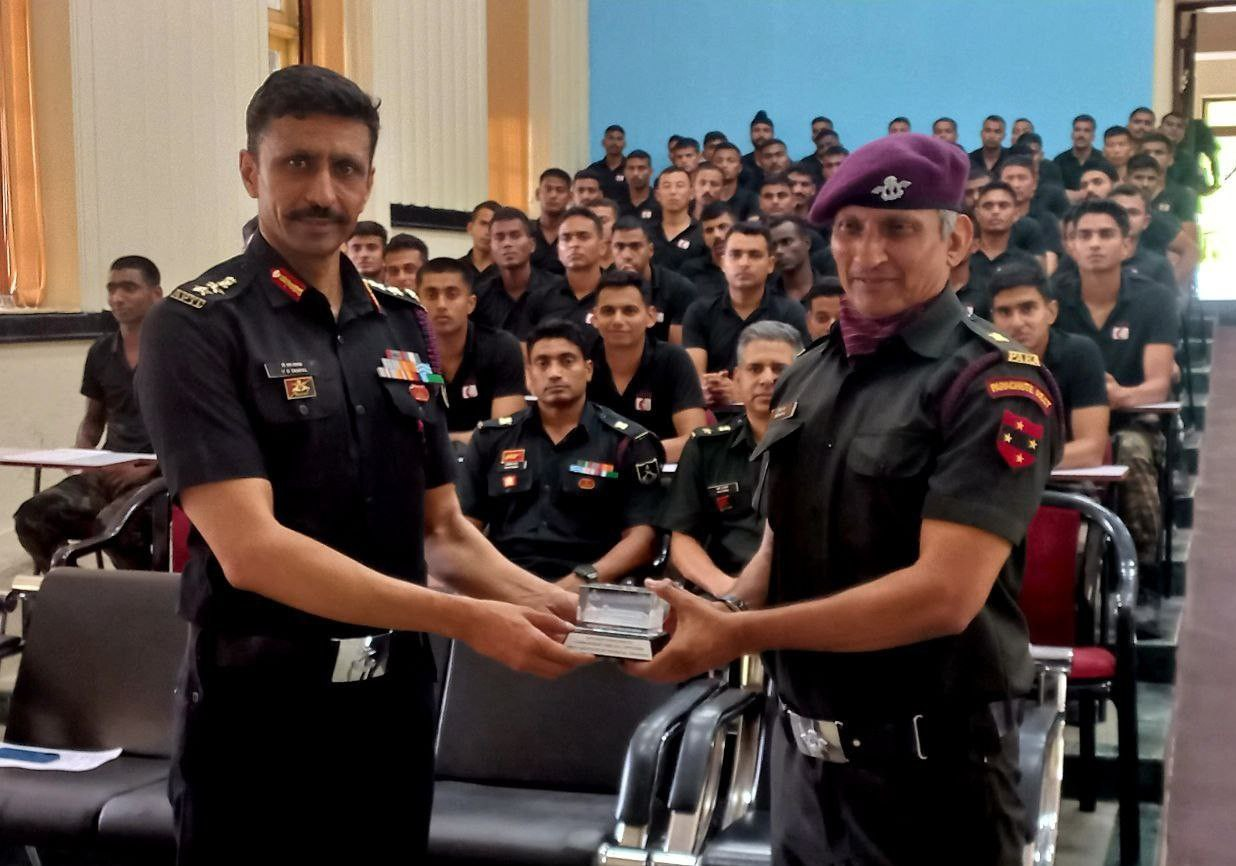

Brand ambassador of Indian Army
- Military career
- Spouse: Seema Rao
- Allegiance: India
- Branch: Indian Army
- Service years: 1994-present
- Rank: Honorary Major
- Unit: Territorial Army
- Website: https://www.majordeepakrao.com/

Deepak Rao is an Indian military trainer and author. He has helped train the Indian Army, Navy, and Air Force, as well as the police forces of major cities and states. For his service in modernization of close quarter battle training, he was awarded commission as Honorary Major of the Indian Territorial Army in 2011. He acts as one of the brand ambassadors for the Indian Army.

Rao has been a trainer for the Indian Army since 1994. He specializes in close-quarters combat, and along with his wife, Seema Rao, invented a new form of reflex shooting, named the Rao System of Reflex Fire, for the Indian Army. He also founded the Advanced Commando Combat System for close-quarters combat.

According to Rao's instructor Richard Bustillo, an original student of Bruce Lee, Rao is one of the few instructors in India who teach Bruce Lee's art of Jeet Kune Do correctly.

In 2024, Rao was asked by Chief of the Army Staff General Manoj Pande to visit the Army Institute of Physical Training to improve the Indian Army Martial Arts Routine by adding new termination skills from his method called Army Battle Combatives. Rao has outlined this method in his book "Strike to Kill".

In 2021, Rao delivered a TEDx talk titled "Zen and Mindfulness," where he discussed the role of Zen principles in enhancing mental balance, awareness, and inner clarity.

== Books ==
Rao has co-authored two books with his wife, "A Comprehensive Analysis of World Terrorism" and "The Encyclopaedia of Close Combat Operations"; the latter was distributed to the Police and Paramilitary for free by the Home Ministry. Some of their books on combat training are included in the UN, FBI and INTERPOL Libraries. He is also the author of Executive Powerplay - The Commando Protocol for Battle-Tested Leadership in Crisis & Uncertainty, which applies Special Forces principles to C-suite leadership, decision-making and performance under crisis and uncertainty.

| Title | ISBN |
|---|---|
| Commando Manual of Unarmed Combat | 978-81-907765-9-2 |
| Forces Handbook of World Terrorism | 978-81-907765-8-5 |
| Encyclopaedia of Close Combat Ops - Advanced Commando Combat System | 978-81-907765-0-9 |
| Balidan: Essential Commando Skills for Counter Terror Ops | 978-81-938895-1-0 |
| Strike to Kill: Army Battle Combatives | 978-81-938895-0-3 |
| Field Book of Explosive Recognition for Anti Terror Ops | 978-81-907765-4-7 |
| Unfreak Your Mind – Rewire with Zen Psychology | 979-82-275278-3-7 |
| AI Powerplay: Command & Control in the Digital Battlespace | 979-82-357260-8-6 |
| The Silicon Powerplay - Power, Politics & the Global Chip Economy | 979-82-357870-9-4 |
| Executive Powerplay: The Commando Protocol | 979-82-321893-9-6 |
