= Ramaswamy Parameshwaran =

Indian army officer (1946 - 1987)

Major Ramaswamy Parameswaran PVC
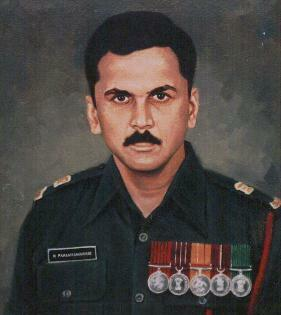
- Born: 13 September 1946; Bombay, Bombay State, British India
- Died: 25 November 1987 (aged 41); Sri Lanka
- Military career
- Allegiance: Republic of India
- Branch: Indian Army
- Service years: 1972–1987
- Rank: Major
- Service number: SS-25573 (short-service commission); IC-32907 (regular commission)
- Units: 8 Mahar Regiment attached to IPKF
- Conflicts: Sri Lankan Civil War; Operation Pawan
- Awards: Param Vir Chakra

Ramaswamy Parameswaran (13 September 1946, Mumbai – 25 November 1987, Sri Lanka) was an Indian military officer, a major who was awarded the Param Vir Chakra, India's highest military decoration, for his bravery during the Sri Lankan Civil War.

== Career ==
Parameshwaran was born in a Tamil Brahmin family and he was granted a Short Service Commission as a second lieutenant in the 15th Battalion Mahar Regiment on 16 January 1972. Promoted to lieutenant on 16 January 1974, he was subsequently granted a regular commission, and was promoted to captain on 12 October 1979 and to major on 31 July 1984.

== Death ==
On 25 November 1987, while he was engaged in search and cordon operations during Operation Pawan, his column was ambushed by a group of militants late at night. He was mortally wounded by a shot in the chest but managed to seize an enemy rifle and neutralize the assailant. He continued to give orders until he died. Five militants were killed their weapons were recovered. He was awarded the Param Vir Chakra posthomously.

== Namesake apartment ==
The Army Welfare Housing Organization (AWHO) built a colony in 1998 in Arcot Road Chennai named A.W.H.O Parameshwaran Vihar in honor of Parameswaran.

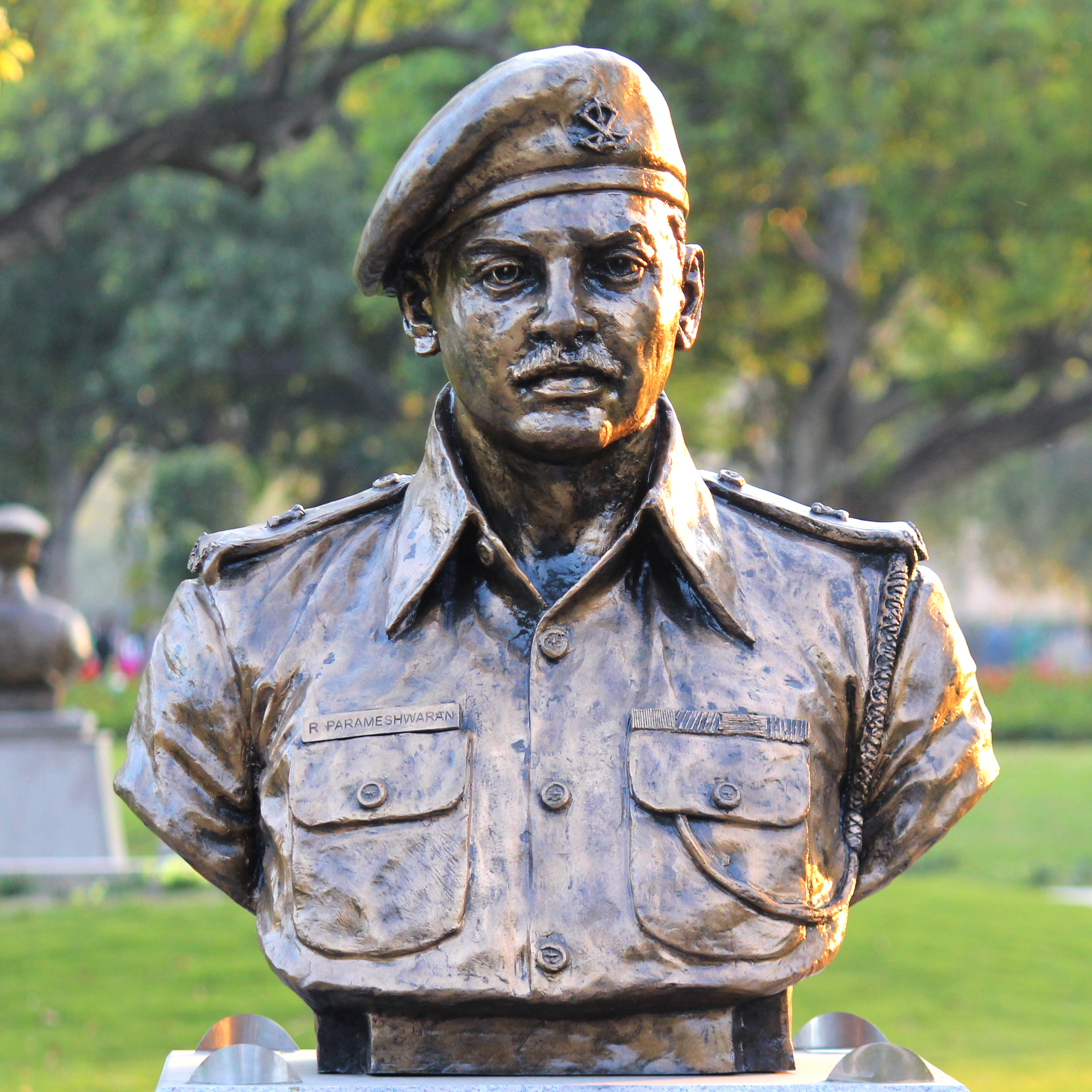
Parameswaran's statue at Param Yodha Sthal, National War Memorial, New Delhi

== See also ==
- Indian Army
- Param Vir Chakra
