= 111th Mahars =

Infantry regiment of the British Indian Army

- Active: 19 June 1917 – 1922
- Country: British India
- Allegiance: British Crown
- Branch: British Indian Army
- Type: Infantry
- Size: Regiment
- Service: First World War

The 111th Mahars was an infantry regiment of the British Indian Army that formed part of the Indian Army during the First World War. Raised in June 1917, it was disbanded in 1922.

== History ==
The 111th Mahars was raised on 19 June 1917 at Mhow. It served with the 5th (Mhow) Division until October when it transferred to the Secunderabad Brigade, 9th (Secunderabad) Division. In March 1918, it moved to Bombay Brigade, 6th Poona Divisional Area until December 1918 when it transferred to Jubbulpore Brigade back in 5th (Mhow) Division. They served on the North West Frontier for six-month in 1920 and then in Aden.

In 1919, the regiment absorbed the 71st Punjabis, but was itself disbanded in 1922. A new Mahar Regiment was raised in October 1941 which continues to serve in the Indian Army.

== See also ==
- 71st Punjabis
- Mahar Regiment

== Bibliography ==
- Gaylor, John (1996). Sons of John Company: The Indian and Pakistan Armies 1903–1991 (2nd ed.). Tunbridge Wells: Parapress. ISBN 1-898594-41-4.
- Perry, F.W. (1993). Order of Battle of Divisions Part 5B. Indian Army Divisions. Newport: Ray Westlake Military Books. ISBN 1-871167-23-X.
