= Seema Rao =

Indian commando trainer

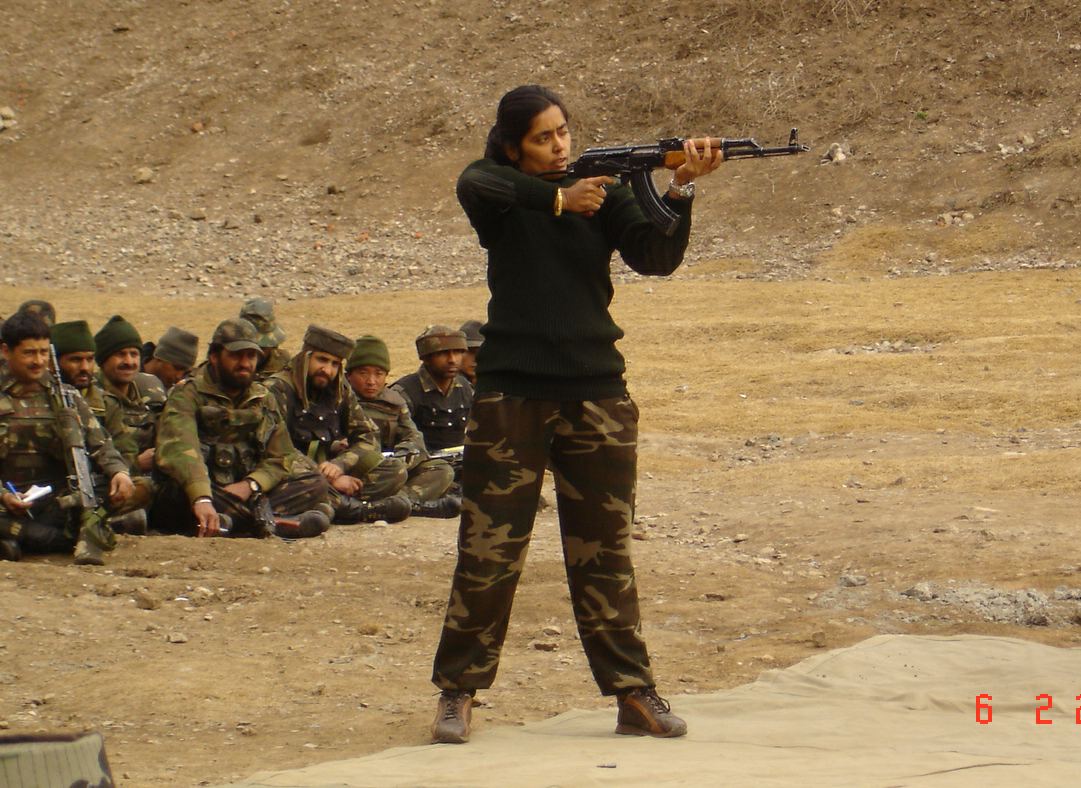
- Seema Rao at Corps Battle School Northern Command Indian Army
- Website: Official website

Seema Rao is popularly known as “Wonder Woman of India” amongst the Indian media. She is India's first female special forces trainer, having trained Special Forces of India for over two decades without compensation. She is an expert in close quarter battle (CQB) — the art of fighting in tight proximity — and is involved in training various Indian forces. She works in partnership with Major Deepak Rao, her husband.

== Biography ==
Born to an Indian freedom fighter, Professor Ramakant Sinari, Rao has an MBA in crisis management. She was a Mrs India World beauty pageant finalist. Seema has also studied Immunology at Harvard Medical School and has an MBA from Westminster Business School.

Rao earned her Para Wings by skydiving in the Indian Air Force course. She is a combat shooting instructor, an Army mountaineering institute HMI medalist, and an 8th degree Blackbelt in military martial arts. She is one of a handful of instructors authorised to teach Jeet Kune Do. She co-invented a new method of shooting, called The Rao System of Reflex Fire, for close quarters combat, along with her husband Deepak Rao. Together, the Raos are recipients of three Army Chief citations for over two decades of contribution to training 15,000 soldiers.

== Awards and recognition ==
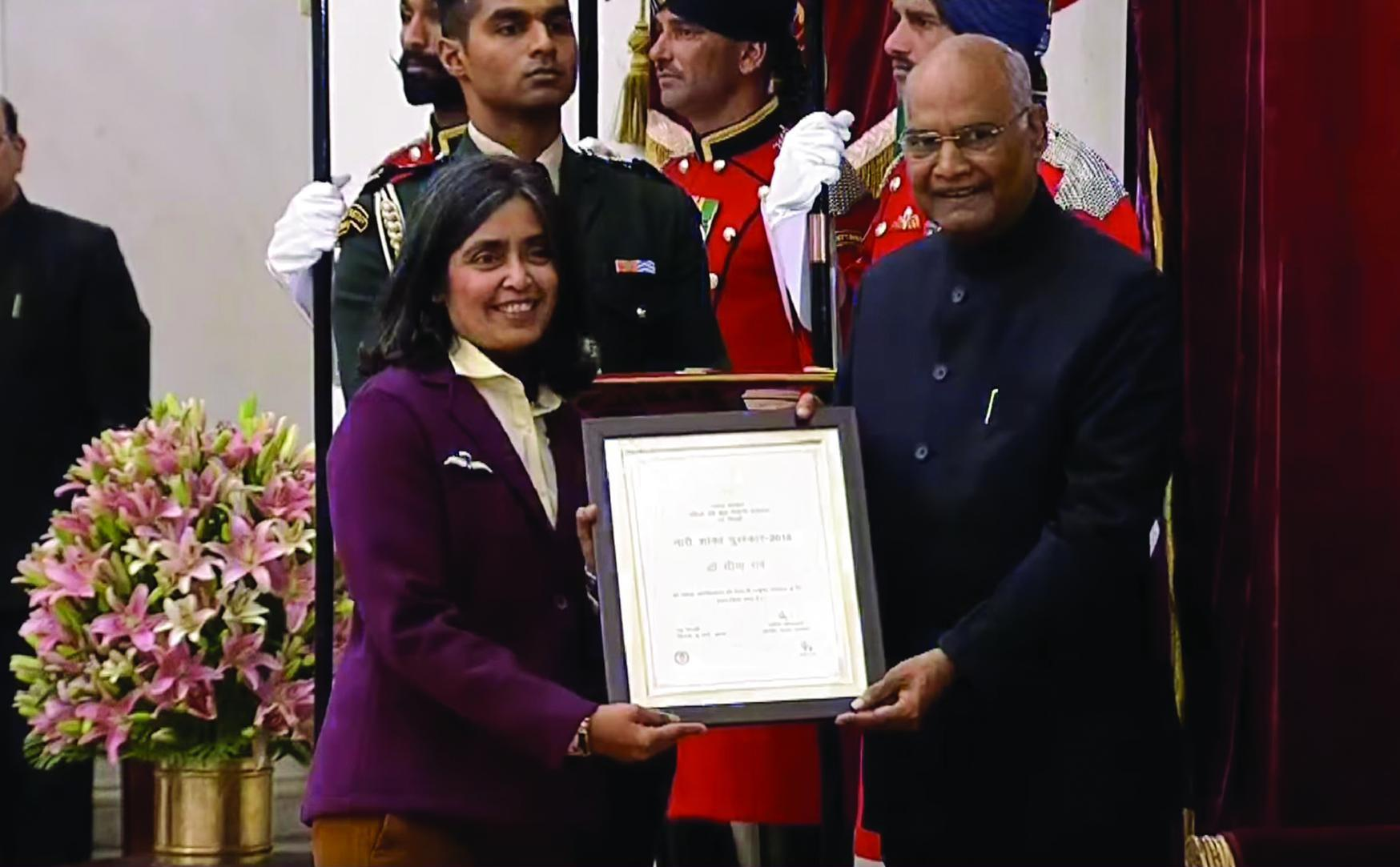
President of India Ram Nath Kovind (right) awarding Nari Shakti Puraskar to Seema Rao (left) on International Women's Day, 2019

Rao was ranked sixth in the 2019 Forbes India W-Power Trailblazer list. She received Nari Shakti Puraskar from the President of India in 2019 and is a World Peace Awardee. She was included in the India today 2024 She List of influential Indian women.

== Books ==
Rao has co-authored several books including "Encyclopedia of Close Combat Ops" and "A Comprehensive Analysis of World Terrorism". She has also written a book "Handbook of World Terrorism" along with her husband. Some of her books on combat training have gone to FBI and INTERPOL Libraries.

Title	ISBN
Commando Manual of Unarmed Combat	978-81-907765-9-2
Forces Handbook of World Terrorism	978-81-907765-8-5
Encyclopaedia of Close Combat Ops - Advanced Commando Combat System	978-81-907765-0-9
Balidan: Essential Commando Skills for Counter Terror Ops	978-81-938895-1-0
Strike to Kill: Army Battle Combatives	978-81-938895-0-3
Field Book of Explosive Recognition for Anti Terror Ops	978-81-907765-4-7
She Powerplay: India's Silent Powershift	979-82-357853-2-8
Executive Powerplay: The Commando Protocol	979-82-321893-9-6
