= Auxiliary Force (India) =

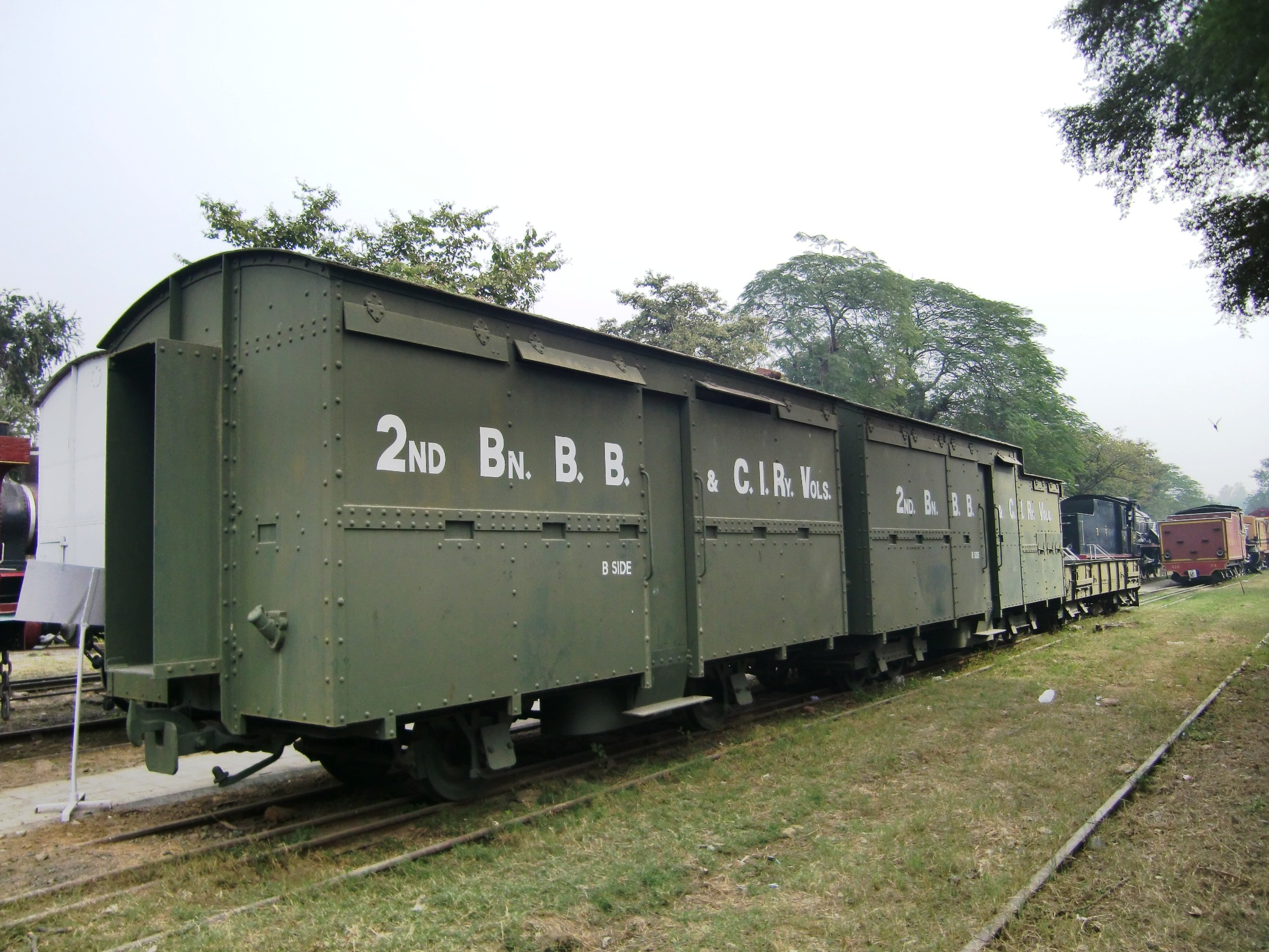
An armoured train of the 2nd Battalion, Bombay, Baroda and Central India Railway Regiment

The Auxiliary Force (India) (AFI) was a part-time, paid volunteer military organisation within the British Indian Army, with recruits from British India. Its units were entirely made up of European and Anglo-Indian personnel. The AFI was formed in 1920, along with the Indian Territorial Force (ITF), replacing the Indian Defence Force (IDF).

== History ==
The AFI was created by the Auxiliary Force Act 1920 to replace the unpopular British section of the Indian Defence Force (IDF), which had recruited by conscription. By contrast, the AFI was an all-volunteer force modelled after the British Territorial Army. The Indian parallel to the AFI was the Indian Territorial Force (ITF) which was composed of British officers and Indian other ranks.

== Units on 3 September 1939 ==
Name	Headquarters
Contingents
Agra Contingent	Agra
Allahabad Contingent	Allahabad
Bangalore Contingent	Bangalore
Bareilly Corps	Bareilly
Bareilly Contingent	Naini Tal
Bombay Contingent	Bombay
Cawnpore Contingent	Cawnpore
Dehra Dun Contingent	Dehra Dun
Delhi Contingent	Delhi
Karachi Corps	Karachi
Lucknow Contingent	Lucknow
Madras Contingent	Madras
Poona Contingent	Poona
Punjab Contingent	Lahore
Cavalry regiments
Assam Valley Light Horse	Dibrugarh
Bihar Light Horse	Muzaffarpur
Bombay Light Patrol	Bombay
Calcutta Light Horse	Calcutta
Chota Nagpur Regiment	Ranchi
Northern Bengal Mounted Rifles	Darjeeling
Punjab Light Horse	Lahore
Southern Provinces Mounted Rifles	Madras
Surma Valley Light Horse	Silchar
Allahabad Detachment, United Provinces Horse (Southern Regiment)	Allahabad
Cawnpore Detachment, United Provinces Horse (Southern Regiment)	Cawnpore
Lucknow Detachment, United Provinces Horse (Southern Regiment)	Lucknow
Armoured Car companies
Bangalore Armoured Car Company	Bangalore
Artillery brigades
Bengal Artillery, RA	Barrackpore
I (Calcutta Port Defence) Brigade, RA	Calcutta
V (Cossipore) Field Brigade, RA	Cossipore
Separate artillery batteries
No. 3 (Madras) Field Battery, RA	Madras
No. 10 (Bombay) Battery, RA	Bombay
No. 13 (Lucknow) Field Battery, RA	Lucknow
No. 15 (Kirkee) Field Battery, RA	Kirkee
No. 17 (Agra) Field Battery, RA	Agra
No. 18 (Bareilly) Field Battery, RA	Bareilly
No. 20 (Cawnpore) Field Battery, RA	Cawnpore
Engineer companies
No. 1 (Calcutta) Fortress Company, RE	Calcutta
No. 3 (Bombay) Fortress Company, RE	Bombay
No. 4 (Karachi) Fortress Company, RE	Karachi
Signal companies
No. 1 (Madras) Signal Company	Madras
Railway battalions
Assam Bengal Railway Battalion	Chittagong
Bengal Nagpur Railway Battalion	Kharagpur
Bengal and North Western Railway Battalion	Gorakhpur
1st Battalion, Bombay, Baroda and Central India Railway Regiment	Lower Parel
2nd Battalion, Bombay, Baroda and Central India Railway Regiment	Ajmer
Eastern Bengal Railway Battalion	Sealdah
1st Battalion, East Indian Railway Regiment	Lillooah
2nd Battalion, East Indian Railway Regiment	Lucknow
1st Battalion, Great India Peninsula Railway Regiment	Parel
2nd Battalion, Great India Peninsula Railway Regiment	Jhansi
1st Battalion, Madras and Southern Mahratta Railway Rifles	Perambur
2nd Battalion, Madras and Southern Mahratta Railway Rifles	Hubli
North Western Railway Battalion	Lahore
South Indian Railway Battalion	Trichinopoly
Infantry battalions
Allahabad Rifles	Allahabad
Bangalore Battalion (Bangalore Rifle Volunteers)	Bangalore
Bombay Battalion	Bombay
Calcutta and Presidency Battalion	Calcutta
Calcutta Scottish	Calcutta
Cawnpore Rifles	Cawnpore
East Coast Battalion	Vizayapatam
Hyderabad Rifles	Secunderabad
Kolar Gold Fields Battalion	Oorgaum
Lucknow Rifles	Lucknow
Madras Guards	Madras
Nagpur Rifles	Nagpur
Nilgiri Malabar Battalion	Ootacamund
Poona Rifles	Poona
Punjab Rifles	Lahore
Simla Rifles	Simla
Sind Rifles	Karachi
Separate infantry companies
Bhusawal Company	Bhusawal
Coorg and Mysore Company	Mercara
Eastern Bengal Company	Dacca
Yercaud Company	Yercaud
Machine-gun companies
No. 2 (Karachi) Machine-Gun Company	Karachi
No. 5 (Agra) Machine-Gun Company	Agra

== In popular culture ==
The Auxiliary Force features extensively in the plot of John Masters' novel Bhowani Junction, focusing on a community of Anglo-Indian railway workers at an Indian town in 1946, on the verge of the British withdrawal.
