= Indian Territorial Force =

Volunteer Unit of British Indian Army

The Indian Territorial Force (ITF) was a part-time, paid volunteer military organisation within the British Indian Army, with recruits from British India. Its units were made up of European officers and Indian other ranks. It was formed in 1920, along with the Auxiliary Force, India (AFI), replacing the Indian Defence Force (IDF).

== History ==
The ITF was created by the Indian Territorial Force Act 1920 to replace the Indian section of the Indian Defence Force. It was an all-volunteer force modelled after the British Territorial Army. The European parallel to the ITF was the Auxiliary Force (India).

After Indian independence, it was succeeded by the Territorial Army in 1949.
