= 71st Punjabis =

Punjab Christian Battalion 71st Punjabis
- Active: 9 July 1917 – 1919
- Country: British India
- Allegiance: British Crown
- Branch: British Indian Army
- Type: Infantry
- Size: Regiment
- Service: First World War

The 71st Punjabis was an infantry regiment of the British Indian Army that formed part of the Indian Army during the First World War. Raised in July 1917, it was later absorbed into the 111th Mahars in 1919.

== History ==
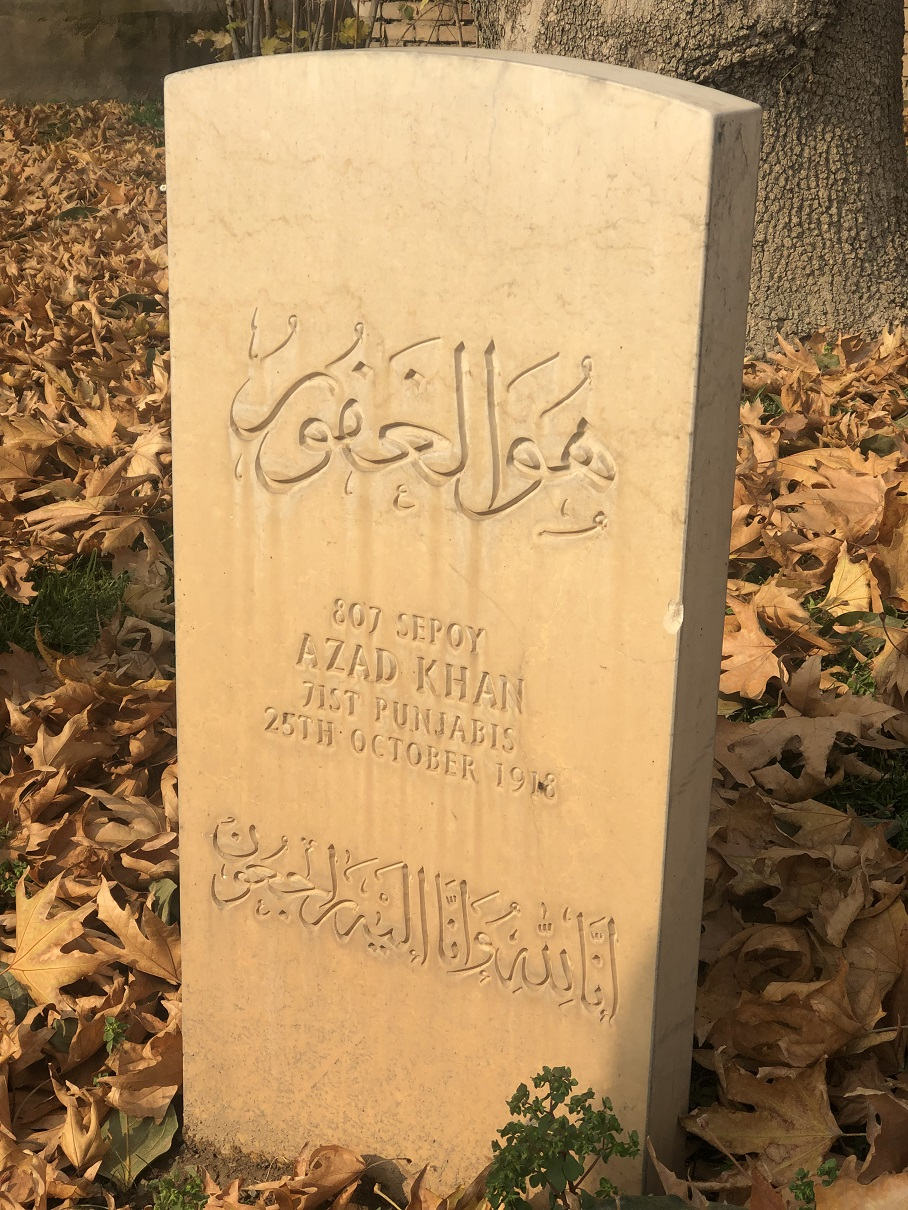
CWGC headstone of a sepoy of the 71st Punjabis in Tehran, Iran

The Punjab Christian Battalion was raised on 9 July 1917 in Montgomery. It was numbered as the 71st Punjabis in December 1917 and joined the 44th (Ferozepore) Brigade in 16th Indian Division. It served with the brigade and division on the North West Frontier until May 1918 when it was transferred to Bushire.

In 1919 the regiment was absorbed into the 111th Mahars.

== See also ==
- 71st Coorg Rifles

== Bibliography ==
- Gaylor, John (1996). Sons of John Company: The Indian and Pakistan Armies 1903–1991 (2nd ed.). Tunbridge Wells: Parapress. ISBN 1-898594-41-4.
- Perry, FW (1993). Order of Battle of Divisions Part 5B. Indian Army Divisions. Newport: Ray Westlake Military Books. ISBN 1-871167-23-X.
