= Indian Defence Force =

Defunct paramilitary force of British India

The Indian Defence Force (IDF) was a part-time defence force established as part of the Indian Army in 1917 in order to release regular troops from garrison duties during the First World War.

It was divided into British and Indian sections. Like the Indian Army of the time, units in the Indian section consisted primarily of British officers and Indian other ranks. Units in the British section were all British. The Indians were volunteers, but many of the Europeans were conscripted, as the Indian Defence Force Act 1917 made military service compulsory for all Europeans permanently residing in British India (including the princely states) between the ages of 16 and 50. Boys between 16 and 18 were only obliged to undertake training and men over 40 only had to serve in their local district, but men between 19 and 40 were obliged to serve anywhere required within the country. Only clergy were exempt.

In 1922, it was announced that those who had served in the IDF during wartime were eligible for the British War Medal.

The IDF was generally unpopular among the British conscripts. It was disbanded in 1920, to be succeeded by the Auxiliary Force (India) and the Indian Territorial Force.
