= Punjab Light Horse =

The Punjab Light Horse was raised in 1867 and formed part of the Cavalry Reserve in the British Indian Army. The regimental headquarters was at Lahore, in Punjab. The regiment was disbanded following India's independence in 1947 and the division of Punjab between Pakistan and India - the city of Lahore became part of Pakistan.

A light horse regiment was roughly equivalent to a battalion in strength (~ 400 men) and its troops typically fought as mounted infantry rather than traditional cavalry.
